= Razmig Hovaghimian =

American entrepreneur

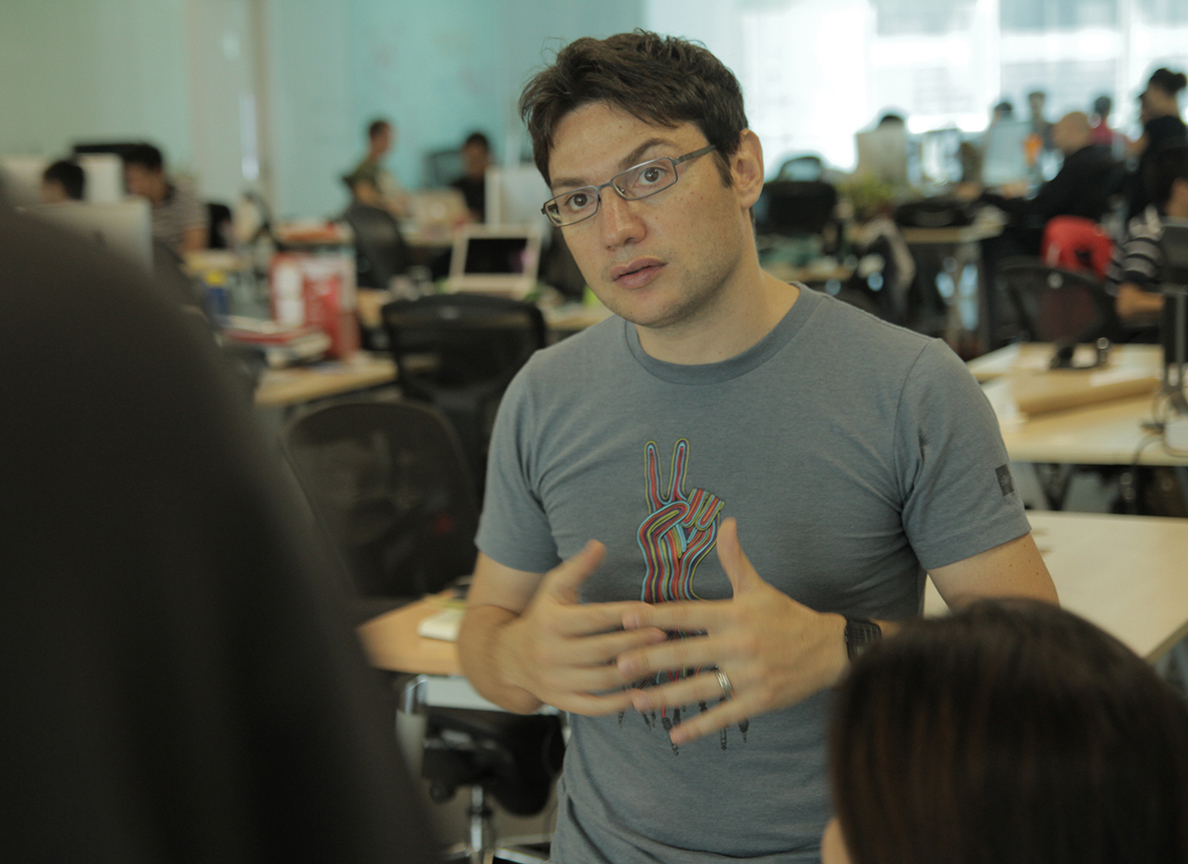
- Born: Cairo, Egypt
- Education: University of California, Berkeley (BA); Stanford University (MBA)
- Occupations: Entrepreneur and company executive
- Known for: CEO & co-founder, Viki; CEO & founder of Hoodline; Senior executive officer of global content, Rakuten; Co-founder, Embrace

Razmig Hovaghimian is an American entrepreneur who co-founded the streaming service Viki and founded Hoodline. As of July 2025, he was co-founder and CEO of artificial-intelligence company Firebird AI. He stepped down as Viki's CEO in 2015 and remained at Rakuten as its first entrepreneur in residence and head of video. He also co-founded the neonatal-health nonprofit Embrace.

== Early life and education ==
Hovaghimian was born in Cairo, Egypt, to Armenian parents. He moved to Los Angeles, California at the age of 16. Hovaghimian attended the University of California at Berkeley, majoring in political economy and minoring in business administration. After graduating, he spent time as a consultant in the US and Europe, before relocating to Japan to work as a management consultant at ad agency Dentsu. He returned to the US to attend the Stanford Graduate School of Business, where he received an MBA.

== Career ==
=== Embrace ===
While attending Stanford, after a summer spent working with the United Nations in South Sudan, Hovaghimian and fellow Stanford classmates Jane Chen, Linus Liang, Naganand Murty and Rahul Panicker founded Embrace, a non-profit that designed and patented an affordable infant incubator for the developing world. Embrace grew to a company based in 14 countries as of 2014. Embrace received an INDEX People's Choice Award, and in 2010 was selected as an Innovative Technology for Public Health by the World Health Organization.

=== NBC Universal ===
In 2007, Hovaghimian went to work at NBCUniversal in the strategic planning group. By 2009, he was a senior vice president, working on the company's digital and international growth strategy. Hovaghimian left NBC later that year to focus full-time on another company he founded, Viki, an international online video service.

=== Viki ===
International online video service Viki also started as another class project while Hovaghimian was at Stanford. He met co-founders Changseong Ho, a fellow Stanford student, and his wife, Jiwon Moon, who was studying education technology at Harvard. Viki gets its name from combining the words video and wiki. It was originally created as a language-learning tool, helping its users learn languages by creating subtitles on online videos.

Hovaghimian served as the company's CEO.

In 2010, Hovaghimian incorporated Viki and moved to Singapore, where he set up the company's headquarters and hired its first engineers. He chose Singapore for the company's headquarters in part due to its proximity to key Asian markets.

Viki eventually morphed into an international online video site, licensing content from countries across the globe, with subtitles crowd sourced from an international community of viewers and volunteer translators. In September 2013, the company was acquired by Japanese e-commerce group Rakuten, for $200 million. At the time, Viki had 22 million viewers per month, and over 200 different viewer countries in Europe, Asia, North America, Africa, Latin America and the Middle East. In August 2013, the World Economic Forum named Viki as one of its 2014 Technology Pioneers.

=== Rakuten ===
In December 2013, following its acquisition of Viki, Rakuten announced that Hovaghimian would become its senior executive officer of global content. In January 2015, he stepped down as Viki's CEO and became Rakuten's first entrepreneur in residence and head of video, while remaining Viki's executive chairman.

=== Hoodline ===
In 2016, Hovaghimian founded Ripple News, a city-focused news platform. Later that year, Ripple acquired Hoodline, another local news site, and took the name Hoodline as the new combined company. In 2019, the Hoodline was acquired by neighborhood social media site Nextdoor. In 2020, publisher Impress3 Media acquired the Hoodline website and brand name from Nextdoor.

=== Film producing ===
Hovaghimian was an executive co-producer, along with Adam McKay, Will Ferrell and Meileen Choo, of Oh Lucy!, a 2017 film starring Josh Hartnett and Shinobu Terajima, and based on a 2014 short film of the same name.

== Honors and awards ==
- Forbes Next Gen Innovator, 2014

== Personal life ==
Hovaghimian lives in San Francisco, California, with his wife and children.
