= The Index Project =

Danish non-profit organisation

Coordinates: 55.6741°N 12.5718°E

- Established: 2002; 24 years ago
- Founder: Kigge Hvid
- Founded at: Copenhagen, Denmark
- Type: NPO
- Purpose: Promote and scale design that improves quality of life
- Location: Copenhagen, Denmark
- Official language: English
- CEO: Liza Chong
- Jury Chair: Philip Battin
- Board of directors: Kjersti Lund
- Website: theindexproject.org

The Index Project, formerly INDEX: Design to Improve Life, is a Danish nonprofit organisation that promotes designs aimed at the improvement of life worldwide, both in developed and developing countries. The organisation is behind the biennial Index Award, the world's biggest design award.

== History ==
Established in 2002, The Index Project was initially proposed by designer Johan Adam Linneballe and then Permanent Secretary of the Ministry of Economic and Business Affairs Jørgen Rosted as a world design event in order to promote Denmark on a global scale, as well as attract tourism and investments. However, it soon acquired a global perspective, and its mission has become expressed in its motto: "Design to Improve Life".

The organisation is under the patronage of the Queen Mary of Denmark. The Index Project is promoted by means of a design award, The Index Award, education programmes, an investment entity, conferences, and publications. As of 2018, the organisation is headed by Liza Chong. It was previously led by founding CEO Kigge Hvid, former CEO of Øksnehallen.

== The Index Award ==
The biennial Index Award was initiated in 2005, and originally financed by the state of Denmark with a total prize sum worth €500,000. In 2005, it was the world's largest monetary award in its area, and today is widely recognised as the most influential in inspiring life-improving design, and has often been dubbed the "Nobel Prize of design". British design critic Alice Rawsthorn in 2011, wrote for The New York Times, "Not only is INDEX: the world's most generous design prize in financial terms, it is one of the few awards to have made a meaningful contribution to design discourse."

Projects from around the world are entered into competition for the award with finalists and winners determined by an international jury. In addition to choosing the successful designs, The Index Award Jury plays a key role in developing and advocating for strategies to expand the borders and impact of design in the world.

=== 2005 winners ===
The first Index Award was announced in September 2004, and the competition received 538 entries representing 50 countries, of which The Index Award Jury chaired by Arnold S. Wasserman selected 118 finalists to participate in The Index Award Exhibition. The winners, announced at the award ceremony at the Copenhagen City Hall on 22 September, were:

- Body Category: Torben Vestergaard Frandsen, Rob Fleuren and Moshe Frommer - "LifeStraw", a plastic straw that cleans contaminated water to prevent diseases such as diphtheria, cholera, typhoid and diarrhea from spreading through drinking water.
- Home Category: Stephanie Forsythe & Todd MacAllen of molo - "Softwall", a 100% recyclable wall to generate personal space in larger rooms
- Work Category: Fundación Española para la Innovación de la Artesanía - "Observatorio Iberoamericano", a strategy, system, and network designed to help over 40 million craftsmen in Latin America
- Play & Learning Category: Apple - iTunes / iPod, a revolution within the music industry and digital rights management
- Community Category: Architecture for Humanity - "Siyathemba – The field of hope", a competition for designers and architects to incorporate football into HIV/AIDS prevention and treatment via a combined football field and health-care facility
- People's Choice Award: Apple — iTunes

=== 2007 winners ===
In 2007, The Index Award received 337 entries, of which the Jury chaired by Nille Juul-Sørensen selected 112 for nomination, and 110 were exhibited on Kongens Nytorv. The winners, announced at the award ceremony at the Copenhagen City Hall on 24 August, were:

- Body Category: Sebastien Dubois - "Mobility for Each One", an energy-return prosthetic foot that can be produced for $8 in a local workshop versus the standard $1,300 to $4,000.
- Home Category: Alberto Meda and Francisco Gomez Paz - "Solar Bottle", a low cost water purification bottle
- Work Category: Philip Greer, Lisa Stroux, Graeme Davies and Chris Huntley - "Tongue Sucker", a simple device, easy to use in an emergency to draw out the tongue of an unconscious person, make the airway unobstructed and hence assist CPR in time-critical situations.
- Play & Learning Category: Elon Musk, Martin Eberhard and Barney Hatt - "Tesla Roadster" a 100% electrical powered sports car with zero emissions and power cost approximately 2 cents per mile
- Community Category: Rebecca Allen, Christopher Blizzard, V. Michael Bove, Yves Behar, Sergio Romero de Azevedo, Walter Bender, Michail Bletsas, Mark Foster, Jacques Gagne, Mary Lou Jepson, Nicholas Negroponte and Lisa Strausfeld - the affordable "XO laptop"
- People's Choice Award: Han Pham - "YellowOne Needle Cap", a cap to be placed onto a soda can to be used for safe disposal of hypodermic needles in low income countries, where these needles are commonly found in trash and thus increase the rates of transmission of diseases and needle injuries.

=== 2009 winners ===
In 2009, The Index Award received 720 entries from 54 countries, of which the Jury chaired by Designit co-founder Mikal Hallstrup selected 72 for nomination and exhibition on Kongens Nytorv as part of the first Copenhagen Design Week. The winners, announced at the award ceremony at Koncerthuset on 28 August, were:

- Body Category: Philip Goodwin, Stefan Zwahlen and John Hutchinson - "Freeplay Fetal Heart Rate Monitor", a heart rate monitor to safeguard childbirth for mothers and infants in remote areas of the developing world where expert care and electrical power are in short supply
- Home Category: Philips Design - "Chulha", a stove designed to limit the dangerous health issues caused by traditions of indoor cooking in many rural areas of the developing world
- Work Category: Kiva.org - "Kiva", a website developed to bring lenders and small entrepreneurs together to aggregate loans into a major center of person-to-person micro-finance
- Play & Learning Category: Christien Meindertsma - "Pig 05049", a book containing a communications design developed in three years of research to track all the products made from a single pig
- Community Category: Shai Agassi - "Better Place", electric vehicle infra-structure to make electric transport convenient and affordable
- People's Choice Award: Jean Madden - "Street Swags", a bed and a bag designed to provide more comfort, warmth and protection from weather for people living on the street

The INDEX: Award Exhibition subsequently went on tour to Seoul and Singapore among others.

=== 2011 winners ===
In 2011, The Index Award received 966 entries from 78 countries, of which the Jury chaired by Nille Juul-Sørensen selected 58 for nomination and participation in The Index Award Exhibition outside the Royal Danish Playhouse on the harbor front in the Frederiksstaden neighbourhood of central Copenhagen. The winners announced at the award ceremony at the Copenhagen Opera House on 1 September were:

- Body Category: Yves Behar - "See Better to Learn Better (VerBien)", free eyeglasses for thousands of school children
- Home Category: Alejandro Aravena, Fernando García-Huidobro and Gonzalo Arteaga - "ELEMENTAL Monterrey", social housing
- Work Category: Kiran Bir Sethi & Pranay Desai - "Design for Change", a global movement designed to give children the opportunity to express their own ideas for a better world and put them into action.
- Play & Learning Category: Anna Haupt & Terese Alstin - "Hövding", a bicycle helmet-airbag to wear as a collar
- Community Category: Seoul Metropolitan Government - "Design Seoul", the first ever coherent design based approach to improve life for citizens in a very large city
- People's Choice Award: Linus Liang, Naganand Murty, Rahul Panicker, Razmig Hovaghimian, and Jane Chen - "Embrace Infant Warmer", thermal regulation infant warmer for premature and underweight born children

=== 2013 winners ===
The 2013 Index Award broke all previous records by receiving 1,022 entries for the competition from 73 countries, of which the Jury chaired by Mikal Hallstrup selected 59 for nomination and participation in The Index Award Exhibition in Rosenborg Castle Gardens. The winners, announced at the award ceremony on 29 August at Kulturværftet in Elsinore under the attendance of Mary, Crown Princess of Denmark, were:

- Body Category: Laerdal Global Health - "The Natalie Collection", a trio of birth simulating devices preventing child and maternal death
- Home Category: Kavita Shukla - "FreshPaper", a simple sheet of paper keeping produce fresh 4 times longer
- Work Category: The city of Copenhagen - "Copenhagen Climate Adaptation Plan", the Danish capital's pioneering plan of how to address the changing climate
- Play & Learning Category: Eben Upton, University of Cambridge - "Raspberry Pi", a $25 computer aiming to digitalise the world
- Community Category: Daan Roosegaarde - "Smart Highway", intelligent roads that communicate with its drivers promoting both traffic safety and traffic efficiency
- People's Choice Award: "Smart Highway" after a close vote on CNN.com

=== 2015 winners ===
The 2015 Index Award were presented at Kulturværftet in Elsinore on 27 August, honouring five winners among the 46 shortlisted finalists chosen from a pool of 1123 entries from 72 countries. The winners were:

- Body Category: Peek Vision - "Peek Retina", a portable eye examination kit that uses apps
- Home Category: Elon Musk - "Tesla Powerwall", a rechargeable battery that aims to revolutionise energy generation
- Work Category: Sky Greens - "Sky Urban Vertical Farming System", a low-carbon, water-driven vertical farm that alleviates environmental impact
- Play & Learning Category: Luis von Ahn for Duolingo, free language-learning apps
- Community Category: Boyan Slat - "The Ocean Cleanup Array", a system to sustainably clean up plastic pollution from the world's oceans
- People's Choice Award: William Janssen - "Desolenator", a mobile, solar energy driven water purifier

=== 2017 winners ===
The 2017 Index Award was presented at Kulturværftet in Elsinore on September 1, 2017, with Alice Tumler as the hostess. Out of 1,401 nominations from 85 countries, 56 were selected as finalists and five of these won an Index Award. Each winner received €100,000 for further development of their design. The winners were:

- Body Category: Zipline - "Zipline", a drone delivery system designed to get critical medical supplies, such as blood and vaccines, to remote places
- Home Category: what3words - "what3words", an address system dividing the world into 3x3m squares, making sure everyone has an address
- Work Category: GreenWave - "Greenwave", a revolutionary ocean farming system designed to restore ocean ecosystems, mitigate climate change, and create jobs for fishermen
- Play & Learning Category: Paperfuge - "Paperfuge", a hand-powered centrifuge made from paper, string and plastic that can detect malaria, HIV and tuberculosis
- Community Category: Ethereum Foundation - "Ethereum", a global, open-source platform to decentralize the distribution of money and information
- People's Choice Award: Labster - "Labster", a virtual reality lab providing high-quality immersive scientific lessons

=== 2019 winners ===
The 2019 Index Award was presented at The Plant in Copenhagen on September 6, 2019, with journalist Peter Stanners as the host. It featured keynotes from past winners such as Mikkel Vestergaard, CEO of Vestergaard, Ryan Sims, VP of Design at Duolingo and Keenan Wyrobek, CEO of Zipline. Out of more than 1,800 nominations, 42 finalists from 19 countries were presented and six of these won an Index Award. The five primary category winners each received €100,000 with their prize. The winners were:

- Body Category: Faber Futures - "Project Coelicolor", a suite of textile dyeing and printing methods with the Streptomyces coelicolor bacteria
- Home Category: AI SpaceFactory - "Marsha", 3D-printed vertical homes designed for life on Mars
- Work Category: SafetyNet Technologies - "Pisces", LED-light emitting devices that attracts certain fish and repels non-targeted species to lower bycatch
- Play & Learning Category: Microsoft - "Xbox Adaptive Controller", a customisable version of the Xbox game controller made for those of limited mobility
- Community Category: Solar Foods - "Solar Foods", the company behind the Solein protein made out of CO_{2} and electricity
- People's Choice Award: Thumy - "Thumy", temporary tattoos and child-friendly insulin pens made to empower Type 1 diabetic children

=== 2021 winners ===
The Index Award 2021 was presented at Volume in Copenhagen on September 30, 2021, and streamed to a global audience. Senior Copywriter from AKQA Jean-Robert Saintil was the host and the show featured a keynote by co-founder of Airbnb Joe Gebbia – his first public talk in Denmark. From 2,134 nominees, 46 finalists were presented and six of these won an Index Award. The five primary category winners each won a prize package worth more than worth over €250,000, including business development sessions with top-tier global consulting agency Boston Consulting Group, creative branding sparring from award-winning AKQA, a feature on the Google Arts and Culture platform, and bespoke design thinking and leadership workshops with The Index Project. The winners were:

- Body Category: Cirqle Biomedical - "OUI", a non-hormonal contraceptive reinforcing women's natural pregnancy barrier.
- Home Category: Flash Forest - "Flash Forest", a scalable and effective reforesting technology using aerial mapping, drone technology and ecological science.
- Work Category: BIOHM - "BIOHM", environmentally regenerative and natural insulation grown from mycelium.
- Play & Learning Category: Play & Learning Category: Truepic - "Truepic Vision & Foresight', groundbreaking technology to authenticate images and videos and combat fake media.
- Community Category: Algorithmic Justice League - "Algorithmic Justice League", an organisation combining art, research and education to show the social implications and harms of AI.
- People's Choice Award: SAGA Space Architects - "LUNARK", a moon habitat designed for humans to thrive in space.

=== 2024 winners ===
The Index Award 2024 winners are:

- Body Category: BIOMILQ is working to leverage their patented mammary biotechnology to make functional human milk components outside the body. By utilising the unique potential of human mammary cells and cell culture technology they hope to nourish healthier babies and bring more of the functional benefits of breast milk to early-life nutrition products.
- Home Category: BFlex® Yarn Using an innovative twinning process, where two yarns are twisted together, BFlex® has been engineered to create a stretch yarn made from a single fiber. This mono-material not only enhances the comfort and durability of clothing but also makes it easier to recycle, contributing to a more sustainable lifecycle for garments.
- Work Category: Great Wrap is a compostable stretch wrap material made from potato waste. The materials perform the same as conventional plastic but will break down in under 180 days while adding organic matter to compost piles leaving no microplastics behind.
- Play & Learning Category: Mapping Survival is a participatory method documenting ancestral nomadic routes and dwindling ressources to end conflict and share resources. To help mitigate tensions, Hindou Oumarou Ibrahim is working with communities in Chad to produce maps to enable them to agree on the sharing of natural resources.
- Community Category: Tushop is lowering food prices by using community leaders, who collect orders from their neighbours and support last-mile deliveries. Each community leader has a virtual shop where the neighbours place their orders, which Tushop aggregates for bulk orders to manufacturers or other producers, like farmers.
