= NOAAS David Starr Jordan =

American fisheries research vessel

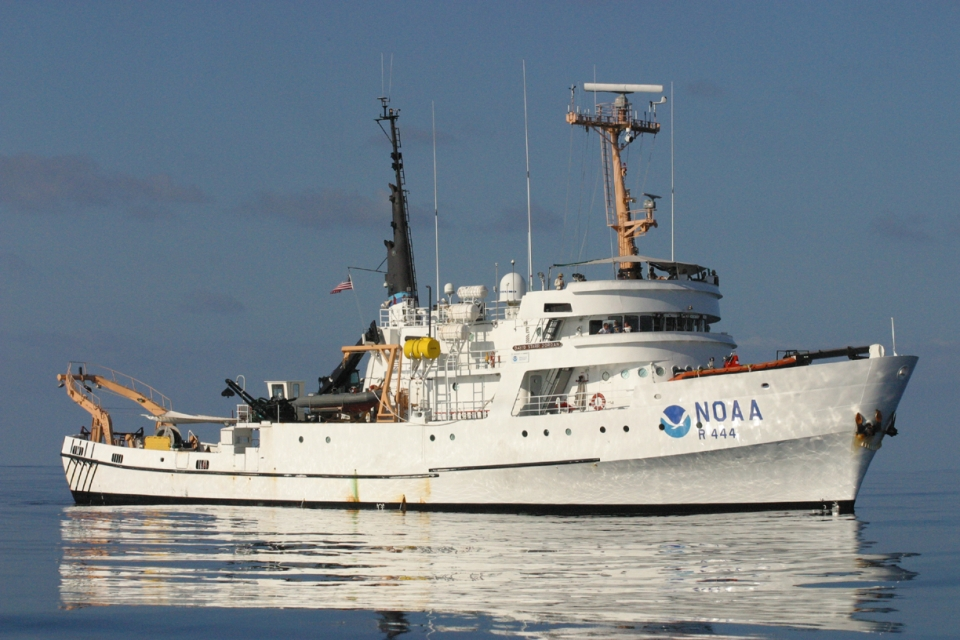
- NOAAS David Starr Jordan (R 444)

History

United States
- Name: US FWS David Starr Jordan
- Namesake: David Starr Jordan (1851–1931), American naturalist and educator
- Operator: U.S. Fish and Wildlife Service
- Builder: Christy Corporation, Sturgeon Bay, Wisconsin
- Launched: 19 December 1964
- Acquired: 5 November 1965 (delivery)
- Commissioned: 8 January 1966
- Identification: Call sign WTDK
- Fate: Transferred to National Oceanic and Atmospheric Administration

United States
- Name: NOAAS David Starr Jordan (R 444)
- Namesake: Previous name retained
- Operator: National Oceanic and Atmospheric Administration
- Acquired: Transferred from Bureau of Commercial Fisheries
- Decommissioned: 3 August 2010
- Identification: IMO number: 7333195; MMSI number: 367122000; Call sign: WDG2073
- Fate: Sold 27 May 2011

United States
- Name: R/V Ocean Starr
- Owner: Stabbert Maritime, Seattle, Washington
- Operator: Ocean Services, Inc.
- Acquired: Purchased 27 May 2011
- Home port: Seattle, Washington
- Identification: IMO number: 7333195; MMSI number: 367122000; Call sign: WDG2073
- Status: Active

General characteristics (as NOAAS David Starr Jordan)
- Type: Fisheries research ship
- Tonnage: 873 gross tons; 262 net tons
- Displacement: 993 tons
- Length: 171 ft (52 m)
- Beam: 36.6 ft (11.2 m)
- Draft: 12.5 ft (3.8 m)
- Propulsion: Two 534-hp (398-kW) White Superior diesel engines, two three-bladed controllable-pitch propellers, one 200-hp (149-kW) General Motors lowerable electric bow thruster
- Speed: 10 knots (19 km/h)
- Range: 8,335 nautical miles (15,436 km)
- Endurance: 31 days
- Boats & landing craft carried: Two rigid-hulled inflatable boats; One fiberglass-hulled boat
- Complement: 14, plus up to 13 scientists
- Aviation facilities: Helicopter pad

General characteristics (as R/V Ocean Starr)
- Type: Oceanographic research ship
- Tonnage: 873 gross tons; 262 net tons
- Length: 171 ft (52 m)
- Beam: 36.6 ft (11.2 m)
- Height: 75 ft (23 m) (maximum above water)
- Draft: 12.5 ft (3.8 m) (loaded)
- Installed power: Two General Motors/Delco generators, 200 hp (149 kw) each
- Propulsion: Two 534-hp (398-kW) White Superior diesel engines, variable-pitch propellers, one Hundested Tunnel Thruster bow thruster
- Speed: 10 knots (19 km/h) (cruising)
- Range: 7,500 nautical miles (13,900 km)
- Complement: 8 to 10, plus up to 23 to 25 scientists including marine technician

NOAAS David Starr Jordan (R444) was an American fisheries research vessel in commission in the National Oceanic and Atmospheric Administration (NOAA) from 1970 to 2010. She previously was in the United States Fish and Wildlife Service's Bureau of Commercial Fisheries fleet from 1966 to 1970 as US FWS David Starr Jordan.

After the conclusion of David Starr Jordan′s NOAA career, Stabbert Maritime purchased her, renovated her, and placed her in service as the oceanographic research vessel R/V Ocean Starr.

== NOAAS David Starr Jordan ==
=== Construction and commissioning ===
David Starr Jordan was built for the U.S. Fish and Wildlife Service by the Christy Corporation at Sturgeon Bay, Wisconsin. She was launched on 19 December 1964, delivered on 5 November 1965, and commissioned into service in the Fish and Wildlife Service's Bureau of Commercial Fisheries on 8 January 1966 as US FWS David Starr Jordan in a ceremony at San Diego, California. She later was transferred to NOAA and became NOAAS David Starr Jordan (R 444) in the NOAA fleet.

=== Characteristics and capabilities ===
A western-rigged trawler, David Starr Jordan was designed and rigged for midwater trawling, bottom trawling, longline sets, plankton tows, oceanographic casts, ocean-bottom sample grabs, scuba diving, and visual surveys of marine mammals and seabirds. She had a hydraulic hydrographic winch with a drum capacity of 15,000 feet (4,600 meters) of 5/16-inch (7.9-mm) line and a maximum pull of 1,600 pounds (730 kg), a hydraulic hydrographic winch with a drum capacity of 30,000 feet (9,100 meters) of 3/16-inch (4.8-mm) line and a maximum pull of 1,600 pounds (730 kg), a hydraulic combination winch with a drum capacity of 6,080 feet (1,850 meters) of 3/8-inch (9.5-mm) wire rope and a maximum pull of 6,500 pounds (2,900 kg), and two hydraulic trawl winches, each with a drum capacity of 8,830 feet (2,690 meters) of 5/8-inch (15.9-mm) line and a maximum pull of 12,000 pounds (5,400 kg). She also had a 50-foot (15-meter) telescoping boom with a lifting capacity of 11,838 pounds (5,370 kg), an 18-foot (5.5-meter) articulated boom with a lifting capacity of 4,650 pounds (2,109 kg), and a movable A-frame.

Equipped to function as a floating laboratory, David Starr Jordan had a 370-square-foot (sq. ft.) (18.6-square-meter) (m^{2}) chemical oceanography laboratory, a 210-sq. ft. (19.5-m^{2}) physical oceanography laboratory, and a 53-sq.-ft. (4.9-m^{2}) biological oceanography laboratory. She also had a 200-sq.-ft. (18.6-m^{2}) scientific information center that served as a data-processing laboratory and a 76-sq.-ft. (7.1-m^{2}) constant temperature room. Her laboratories had temperature-controlled aquaria and live specimen wells, and she had a walk-in freezer, a dark room, and an underwater observation chamber in her bow and on her port side for studying fish behavior at sea. David Starr Jordan had a helicopter platform, allowing her to host a helicopter for aerial observations and photographic survey missions. She carried three boats, an 18.5-foot (5.6-meter) Zodiac rigid-hulled inflatable boat (RHIB), an 18-foot (5.5-meter) Avon RHIB, and a 12-foot (3.7-meter) Boston Whaler fiberglass-hulled boat. All three boats were powered by gasoline outboard motors.

In addition to her crew of 14, David Starr Jordan could accommodate up to 13 scientists.

=== Service history ===
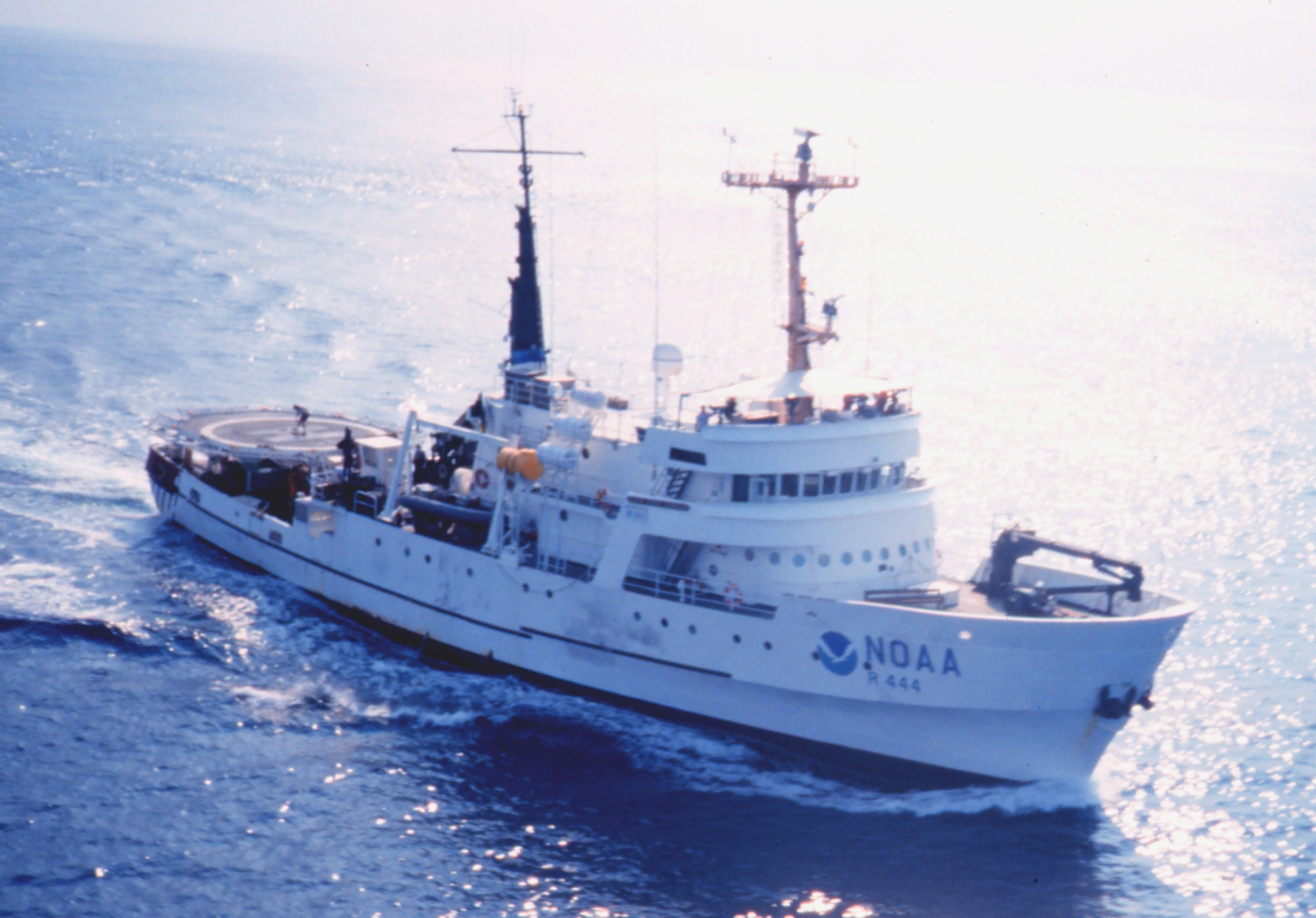
NOAAS David Starr Jordan (R 444) as seen from NOAA's MD 500 helicopter during marine mammal studies in the tropical eastern Pacific Ocean in the autumn of 1999.

David Starr Jordan was built for the purpose of fisheries research in the tropical Pacific Ocean. She spent her career studying the biological and physical oceanography off the southwestern coast of the United States and in the tropical eastern Pacific Ocean off the coasts of Central America and South America in support of the management of fish, marine mammal, and sea turtle populations. Her home port was San Diego.

David Starr Jordan's first assignment in January 1966 was to take part in the California Cooperative Fisheries Investigation (CalCOFI), a joint effort by the U.S. Fish and Wildlife Service (taken over by NOAA after its formation in 1970) and the Scripps Institution of Oceanography to assess fish populations off the coast of California. It became a long-term commitment for her. During quarterly CalCOFI research cruises off southern and central California, scientists embarked aboard David Starr Jordan studied the marine environment and the management of its living resources as the ship collected hydrographic and biological data on the California Current system and monitored the indicators of El Niño events and climate change.

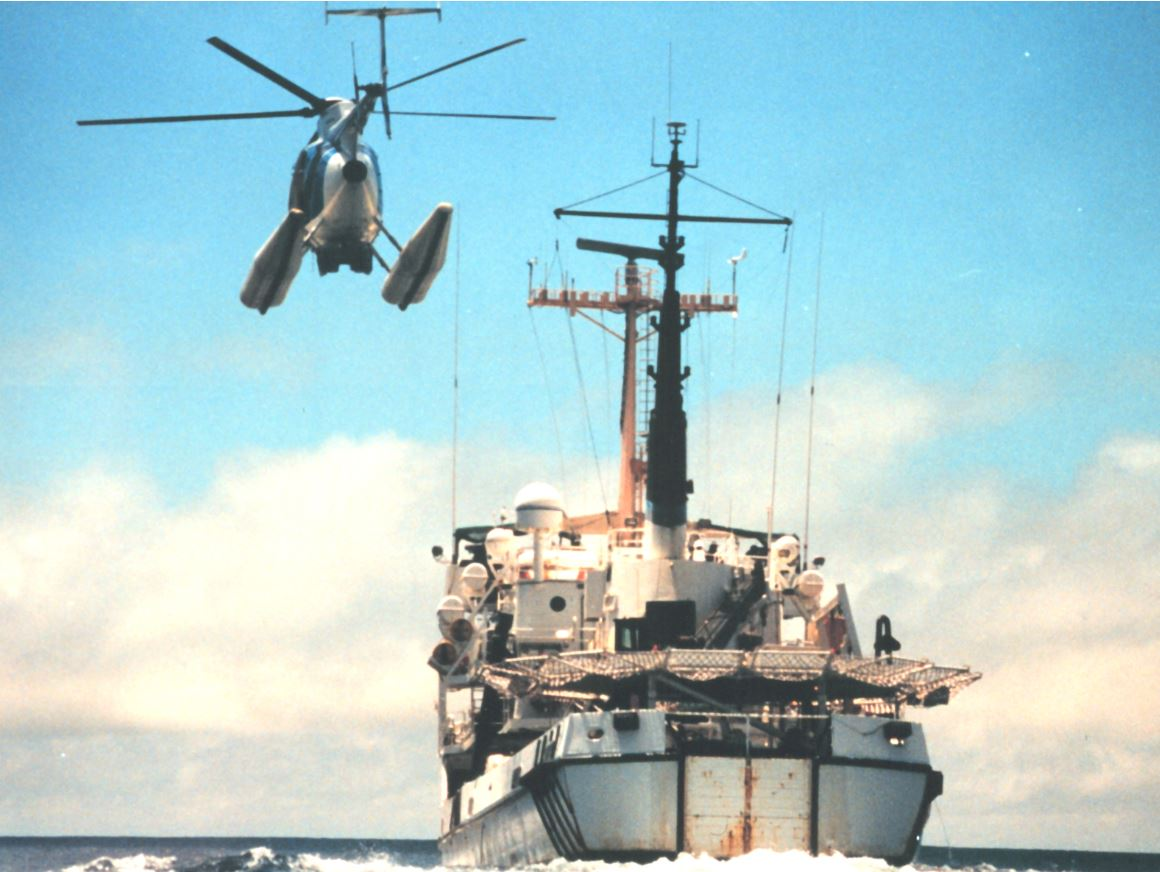
NOAAS David Starr Jordan (R 444) and NOAA's MD500 helicopter operating together during marine mammal studies in the tropical eastern Pacific Ocean.

Operated by NOAA's Office of Marine and Aviation Operations after NOAA was established on 3 October 1970, David Starr Jordan supported NOAA's National Marine Fisheries Service Southwest Fisheries Science Center Laboratory in La Jolla, California. Dolphin population assessment in the eastern tropical Pacific Ocean was one of her longstanding missions, and she was an integral part of the marine mammal surveys conducted by the laboratory's Protected Resources Division, including the Stenella Abundance Research Project (STAR), a three-year study of dolphin stocks taken as incidental catch by the yellowfin tuna purse-seine fishery in the eastern tropical Pacific. When assessing dolphin populations, she operated in cooperation with NOAA's MD 500 helicopter, which provided aerial photography support; from the photographs, scientists could measure the length of individual animals and count the number of dolphins in selected schools, which then could be used to calibrate estimates of the sizes of schools of dolphins made by observers aboard David Starr Jordan. Data David Starr Jordan collected were critical in supporting the "dolphin-safe” tuna campaign and labeling requirements and led to a major reduction in dolphin mortalities related to the operations of the yellowfin tuna industry.

Researchers embarked on David Starr Jordan investigated seasonal variations in ocean temperature, currents and salinity. David Starr Jordan also conducted an annual juvenile striped bass survey, shark surveys, and occasional special research work required by the Southwest Fisheries Science Center Laboratory. She took part in several research expeditions that took her as far afield as Mexico, Peru, and the Galapagos Islands.

In all David Starr Jordan logged over 1,300,000 nautical miles (2,400,000 kilometres) and spent an estimated 8,949 days at sea, averaging over 240 days at sea per year. She measured and weighed 1,000 sea turtles, took 27,000 photographs using remotely operated vehicles, and conducted 27,000 oceanographic sampling casts, 22,000 plankton tows, and 4,700 fish trawls.

The ashes of the noted fisheries scientist Oscar Elton Sette (1900–1972) were scattered at sea in the Pacific Ocean from the deck of David Starr Jordan on 7 September 1972.

After over 44 years of service, David Starr Jordan was decommissioned on 3 August 2010 and sold at auction on 27 May 2011.

== R/V Ocean Starr ==
=== Characteristics and capabilities ===
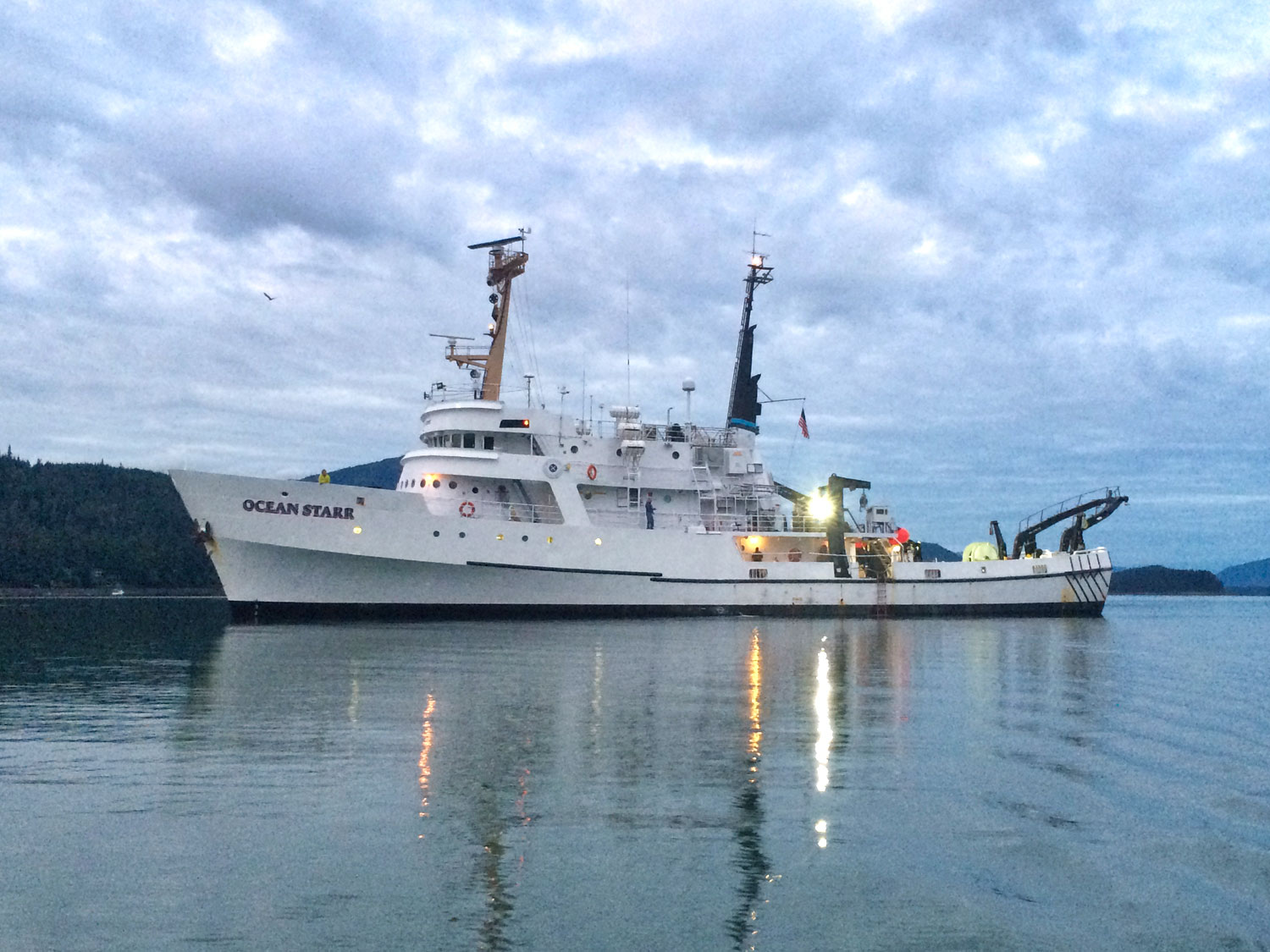
R/V Ocean Starr in July 2017.

Stabbert Marine of Seattle, Washington, purchased the ship, renovated her, and placed her in service as the privately owned research vessel R/V Ocean Starr. Classified by the American Bureau of Shipping as an oceanographic research vessel, Ocean Starr emerged from her renovation with six laboratory spaces with a combined total floor space of 1,058 square feet (98.3 square meters), deck space of 1,670 square feet (155 square meters) on her main deck and 900 square feet (84 square meters) on her 01 level, a CTD winch, a hydraulic winch, a stern A-frame, and a 50-foot (15-meter) Alaska Marine telescopic boom crane with a lifting capacity of 11,838 pounds (5,370 kilograms). She can carry 50,000 U.S. gallons (190,000 liters) of fuel, 410 U.S. gallons (1,600 liters) of lubricating oil, and 8,000 U.S. gallons (30,000 liters) of potable water. She has temperature-controlled aquaria, live specimen wells, a walk-in freezer, a dark room, a data processing laboratory, and an underwater observation chamber in her bow and on her port side that allows embarked personnel to study the behavior of fish at sea. Her accommodations for her eight to 10 crew members and up to 23 to 25 embarked scientists include 19 staterooms.

=== Service history ===
With her home port at Seattle, Ocean Starr is operated for Stabbart Maritime by Ocean Services, Inc. She operates in the Pacific Ocean, sometimes under charter to NOAA. Among other duties, she continues to conduct CalCOFI cruises, and hosts teachers taking part in NOAA's Teacher at Sea program. In May 2013, she conducted an annual National Marine Fisheries Service cruise along the United States West Coast to survey populations of ichthyoplankton, krill, jellyfish, squid, and other marine life. On July 23, 2015, with the lead oceanographer for The Ocean Cleanup and 15 researchers and citizen scientists on board, she departed San Francisco, California, to operate as one of approximately 30 vessels that took part in the Mega Expedition, in which the vessels cruised in parallel across the Great Pacific Garbage Patch, covering 3,500,000 square kilometers (1,400,000 square miles) of the Pacific Ocean in an effort to collect more plastic samples in three weeks than had been collected in the previous 40 years combined. In the autumn of 2015, she conducted a survey sponsored by the Government of Mexico of endangered vaquitas off the coast of Mexico. In July 2017, United States Geological Survey scientists spent 21 days aboard Ocean Starr collecting imagery of the Queen Charlotte-Fairweather Fault System off southeastern Alaska.

== See also ==
- NOAA ships and aircraft
