= Michael Bletsas =

Greek academic

Michail Bletsas
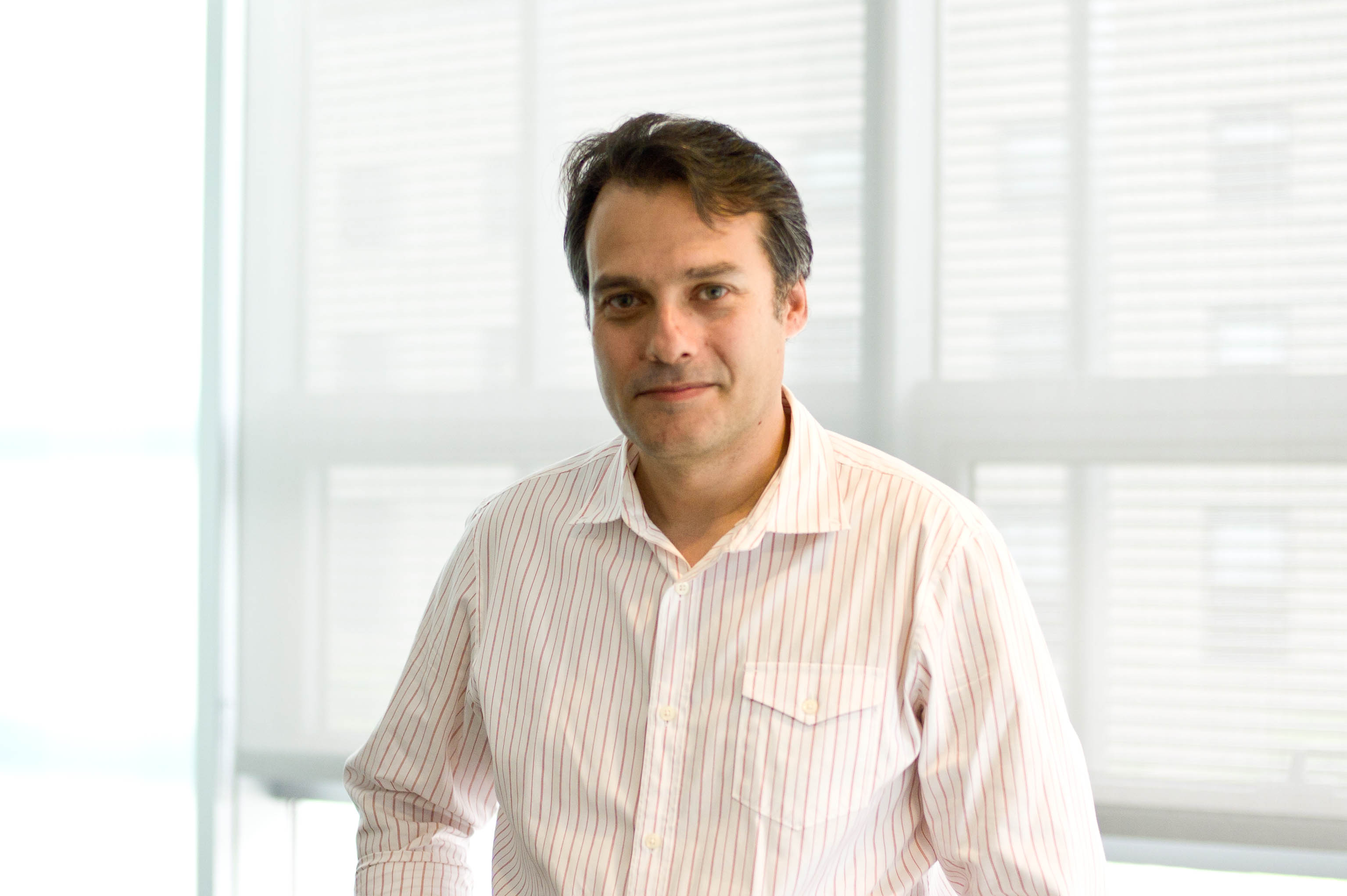
- Born: 1967; Chania
- Occupation(s): Academic and Computer Scientist

Michail Bletsas (born March 19, 1967) is a Greek research scientist and the Director of Computing at the MIT Media Lab.

== Early life ==
Bletsas was born in Chania, Crete. He studied at Aristotle University of Thessaloniki and received a master's degree in computer engineering from Boston University.

== Career ==
Before joining the Media Lab, Bletsas was a Systems Engineer at Aware Inc. He is one of the founders of the Greek mobile advertising and marketing company Velti S.A. and he was also one of the leaders in an effort to provide wireless networking to the island of Patmos, Greece.

Since June 23, 2010, Bletsas is an Independent Non-Executive Director of Hellenic Telecommunications Organization SA (Athens, Greece).

== OLPC ==
Michail Bletsas is one of the designers of OLPC's XO laptop. He was one of the principals of the OLPC team where he made various contributions, including the design and implementation of the first embedded layer-2 wifi mesh stack. From February 2006 to January 2009, he was OLPC's Chief Connectivity Officer and VP Advanced Technology and he was member of the group which received the Community category award of the 2007 Index: Award, for the design of the OLPC XO-1 laptop computer.

== Conferences ==
He was a keynote speaker at the 4th and 5th Annual IEEE Consumer Communications & Networking Conference in Las Vegas, Nevada, 2007 and 2008 respectively, at the 8th International Conference on Computer Based Learning in Science in Heraklion, Crete, 2007, at Disruptions 2007 in Athens, Greece, and at the 4th Balkan Conference in Informatics in Thessaloniki, Greece, 2009.
