= Mr. Trash Wheel =

Water-wheel vessel

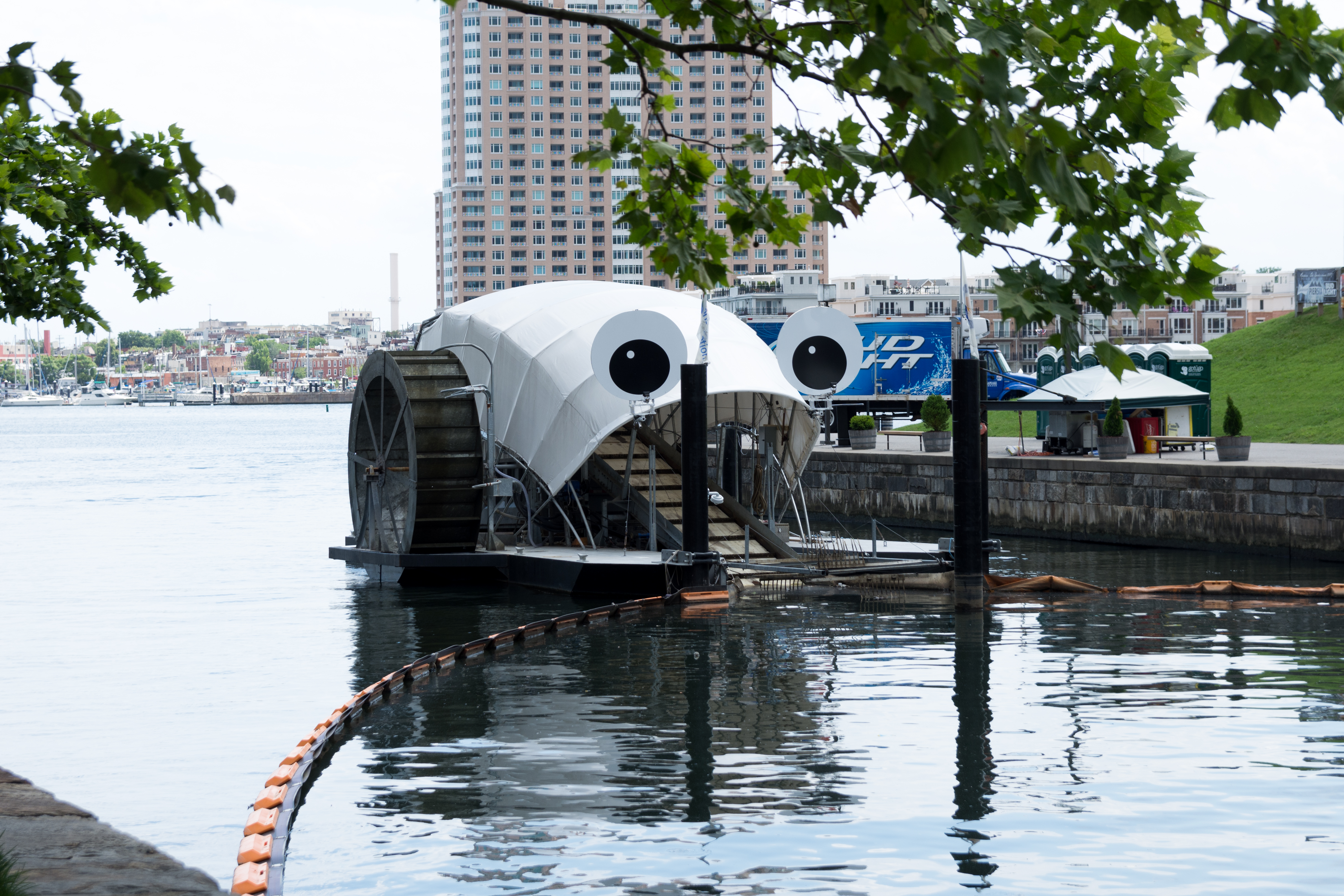
Mr. Trash Wheel (2016)

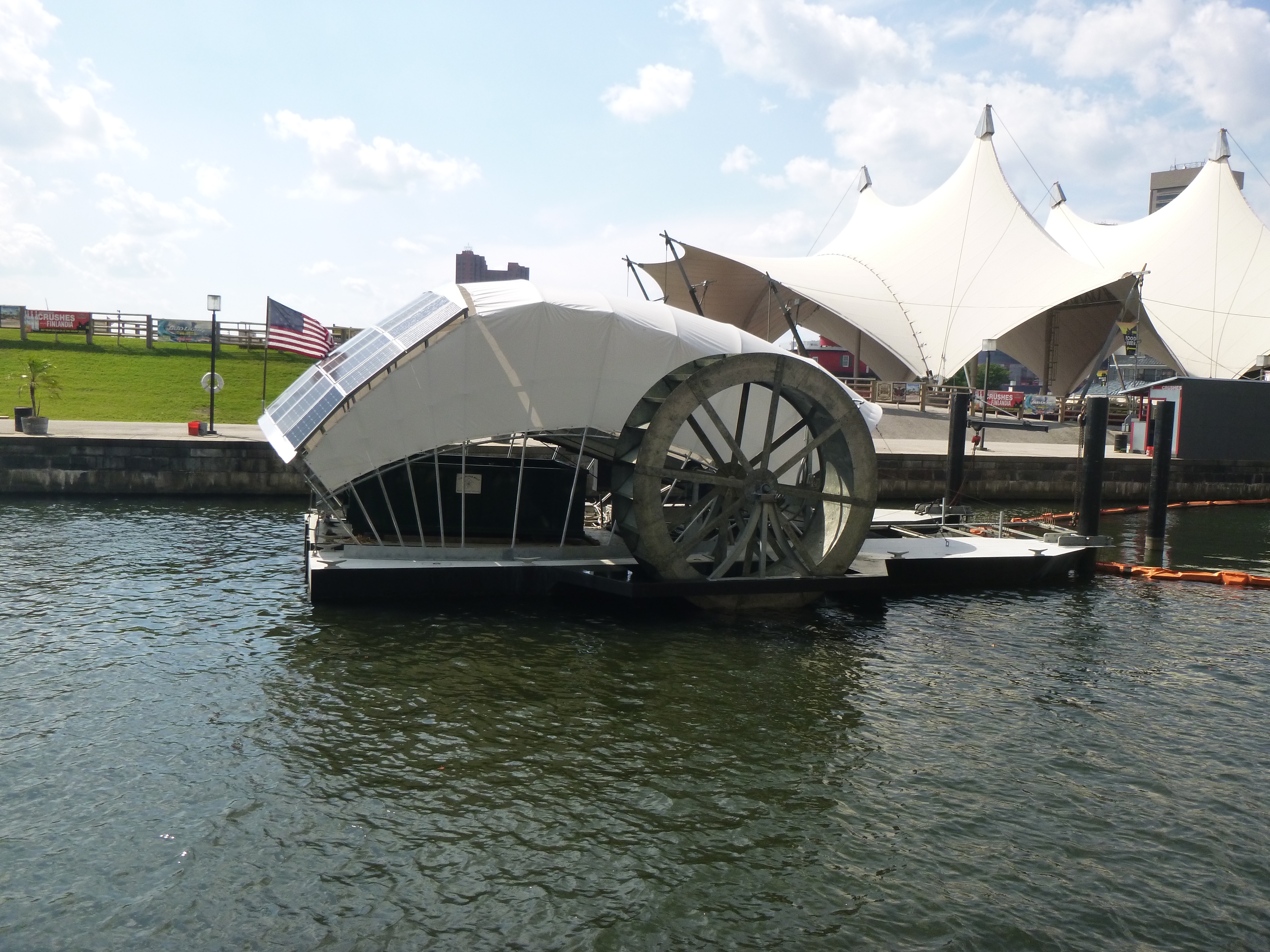
Mr. Trash Wheel

Mr. Trash Wheel is a trash interceptor that removes trash from the Jones Falls river as it empties into the Inner Harbor in Baltimore, Maryland. It is powered by a water wheel and solar cells, and rakes trash from the harbor onto an onboard conveyor belt which routes it into a dumpster on the vessel. Mr. Trash Wheel was invented by John Kellett in 2008, who launched a pilot vessel at that time. A larger vessel was later developed; it replaced the pilot vessel and was launched in May 2014. The Mr. Trash Wheel vessel is part of the Waterfront Partnership of the City of Baltimore's "Healthy Harbor Initiative".

== Overview ==
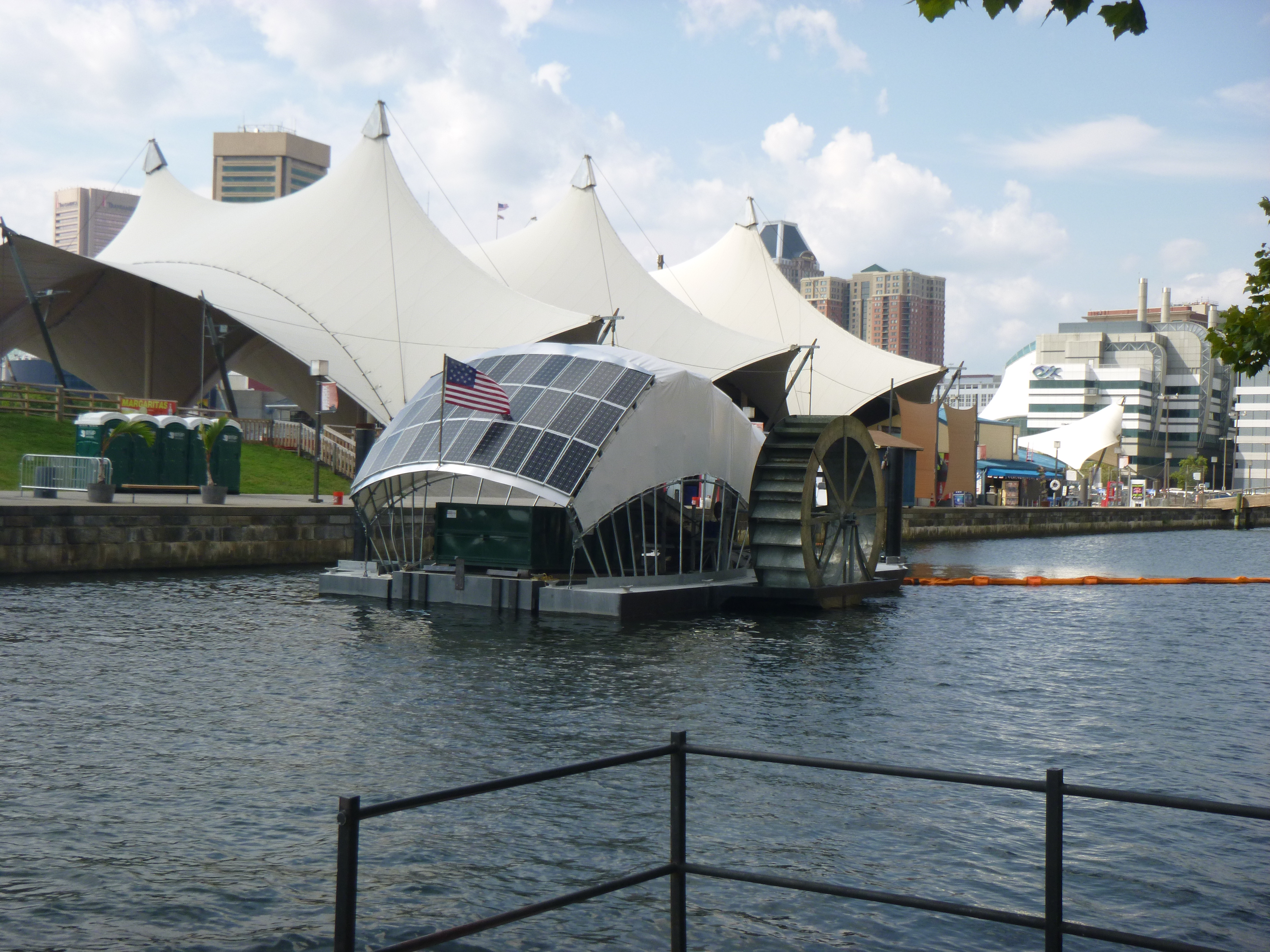
Solar panels are mounted atop the roof of Mr. Trash Wheel.

Mr. Trash Wheel is a moored vessel that removes trash from the mouth of the Jones Falls stream at Baltimore's Inner Harbor. Rubbish from the streets of Baltimore flushes into storm drains that empty into Jones Falls. The floating trash is then carried by the river to its outlet into the Inner Harbor, where it is captured by Mr. Trash Wheel. The water wheel can be controlled remotely on the Internet. Mr. Trash Wheel was constructed using $720,000 of public and private funding.

== Method of removal ==
- Step 1: Trash is funneled into the mouth of the wheel using containment booms, which have a 2-foot skirt, allowing trash to collect from below the surface.
- Step 2: Mr. Trash Wheel rakes litter onto the conveyor belt using rotating forks that dip into and out of the water. Though the conveyor belt is slow, it can lift heavy objects (tires, mattresses, even trees).
- Step 3: The 14-foot wheel powers the rake and conveyor belt, even if the vessel is moving upstream. If Mr. Trash Wheel does not have enough power from the current, solar panels are used to pump water onto the wheel.
- Step 4: Trash at the top of the conveyor belt falls into a dumpster on a floating barge, which is periodically emptied.

== History ==
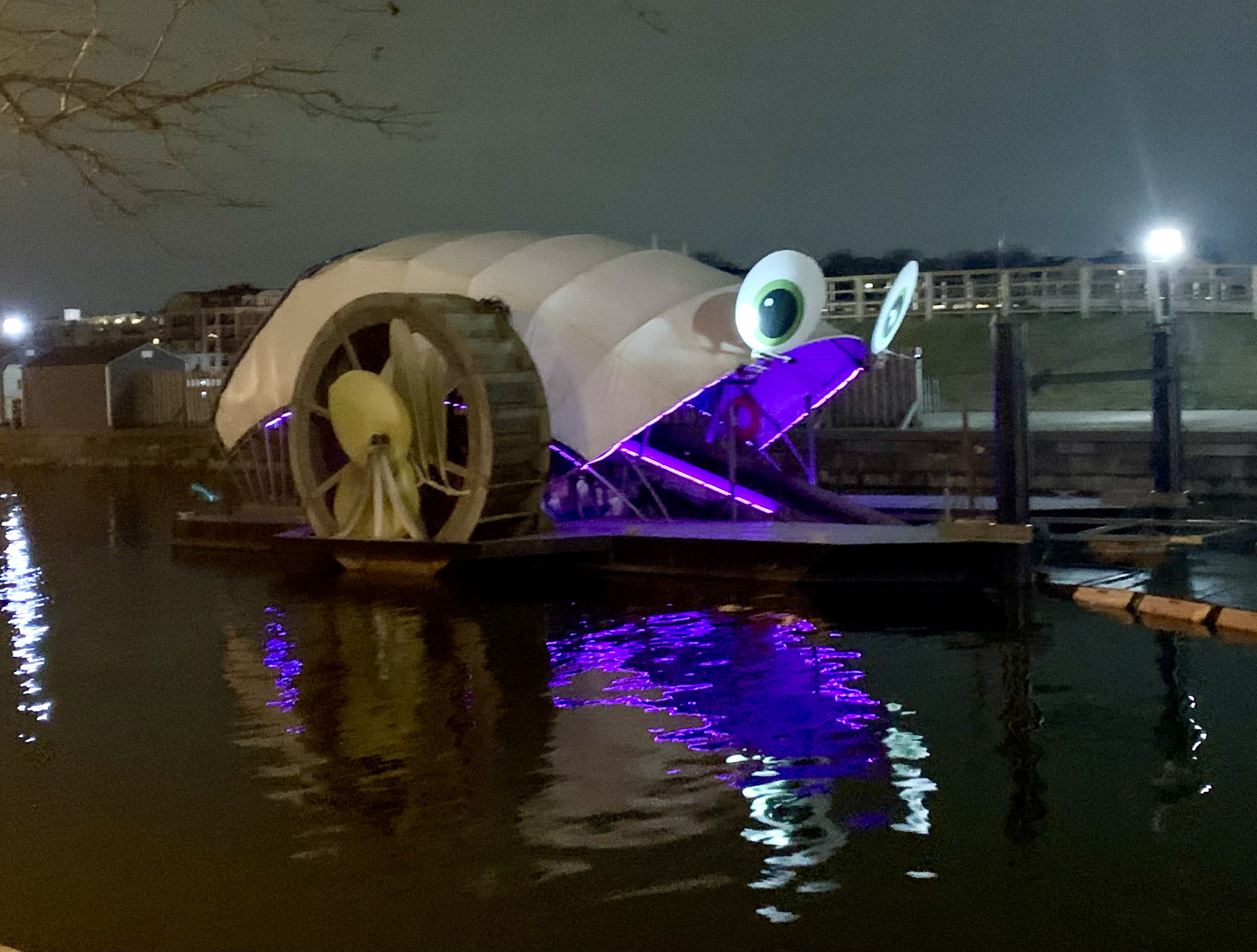
Mr. Trash Wheel at night

Mr. Trash Wheel was invented by John Kellett, who developed the idea when observing trash in the harbor while passing Pier 6 on his walk to work. A pilot trash wheel was built and launched in the harbor by Kellett in 2008. Kellett then built a larger machine, launched in May 2014, which was able to pick up larger matter and held two dumpsters onboard. The use of two dumpsters allows the vessel to operate longer without having to go back to shore to empty the single dumpster that was used on the initial pilot vessel.

On April 20, 2015, after the first significant rain storm of the season, Mr. Trash Wheel removed 19 tons of garbage from Baltimore's waterfront on that one day. The previous record for debris removal occurred on May 16, 2014, when the machine removed 11 tons. At the end of the third quarter in 2016 (September 30), it was noted that Mr. Trash Wheel had collected over 1,000,000 pounds (500 short tons) of trash since its inception.

Mr. Trash Wheel is part of the Waterfront Partnership of Baltimore's "Healthy Harbor Initiative", which was started with a goal to clean up the harbor to the point of making it swimmable by the year 2020. In 2015, the Waterfront Partnership of Baltimore began fundraising efforts to construct a second water wheel like Mr. Trash Wheel for use "off the Boston Street Pier Park" at the Harris Creek outfall in Canton, Baltimore. This second trash wheel has been given the name "Professor Trash Wheel". As of 2023, the trash wheel family had collected 2,362 tons of trash.

Adam Lindquist, Vice President of the Waterfront Partnership of Baltimore and leader of the Healthy Harbor Initiative, approached What Works Studio, a marketing agency based in Baltimore and San Diego, to leverage the popularity of a video of the device in 2015. What Works Studio creative strategist Justin Allen was immediately struck with the organic look of the device and suggested personifying it with googly eyes and giving it a name. Several names were suggested by the What Works Studio staff, but Mr. Trash Wheel is the one that stuck. What Works Studio suggested using Twitter as the primary channel for communication, and Mr. Trash Wheel started gaining a following under the management of multiple What Works Studio staff. At this point, the googly eyes existed only on images of the trash wheel. The first set of physical eyes, handmade by Lindquist in his spare time, were removed after a brief period. In March 2016, Key Tech, a Baltimore-based technology solutions company, donated a more robust pair of permanent eyes.

In 2023, a 15-minute documentary was created by the Rivers are Life media company to educate viewers about Mr. Trash Wheel and the Baltimore water wheel family.

In April 2025, Mr. Trash Wheel was outfitted with a purple Ravens-themed tarp. The football team announced a five-year, $3.75 million funding partnership to support the Healthy Harbor Initiative.

The Trash Wheel Fan Fest is a yearly festival held to celebrate Mr. Trash Wheel, generating unique works of fan art.

== Additional instances ==
Several additional trash wheels have been produced since the success of the original. Three of them in the Baltimore Harbor, one on the West Coast and one in Central America.

Like Mr. Trash Wheel, the others deployed so far in Baltimore have also been anthropomorphized:

- Professor Trash Wheel, the Canton-based wheel, is visually distinguishable from the others by her green googly eyes with lashes, and was commissioned in December 2016;
- Captain Trash Wheel has brown irises. It was installed in June 2018 at Brooklyn.
- Gwynnda the Good Wheel of the West was installed at the mouth of the Gwynns Falls in June 2021, and has purple eyes and lashes. The largest of the four wheels, she picks up more trash and debris than the three other wheels combined. In 2022, Gwynnda was officially sponsored by SpongeBob SquarePants: Operation Sea Change for one year.

Working with Kellett, Panamanian officials were able to secure a grant to place a trash wheel in Panama City. The wheel began operating in September 2022 on the Juan Diaz river.

In March 2025, the City of Newport Beach completed construction of the Newport Bay Trash Interceptor on the San Diego Creek. John Pope, a spokesperson for the Newport Beach city manager’s office said "There’s 'no question' the wheels in Baltimore inspired the work in California" and "The Newport Beach wheel probably won’t get adorned with googly eyes or be anthropomorphized like the trash wheel family in Baltimore".

Since 2019 The Ocean Cleanup organization has deployed more than twenty "River Interceptors" in nine countries around the world. A River Interceptor is a solar-powered barge with a long floating barrier that extends upstream. The barrier funnels debris into the vessel’s mouth, where a conveyor belt ferries the trash into onboard containers. Adam Lindquist, director of the Waterfront Partnership of Baltimore’s Healthy Harbor campaign said about the project “And certainly imitation is the greatest form of flattery.”
