= Boyan Slat =

Dutch inventor and entrepreneur

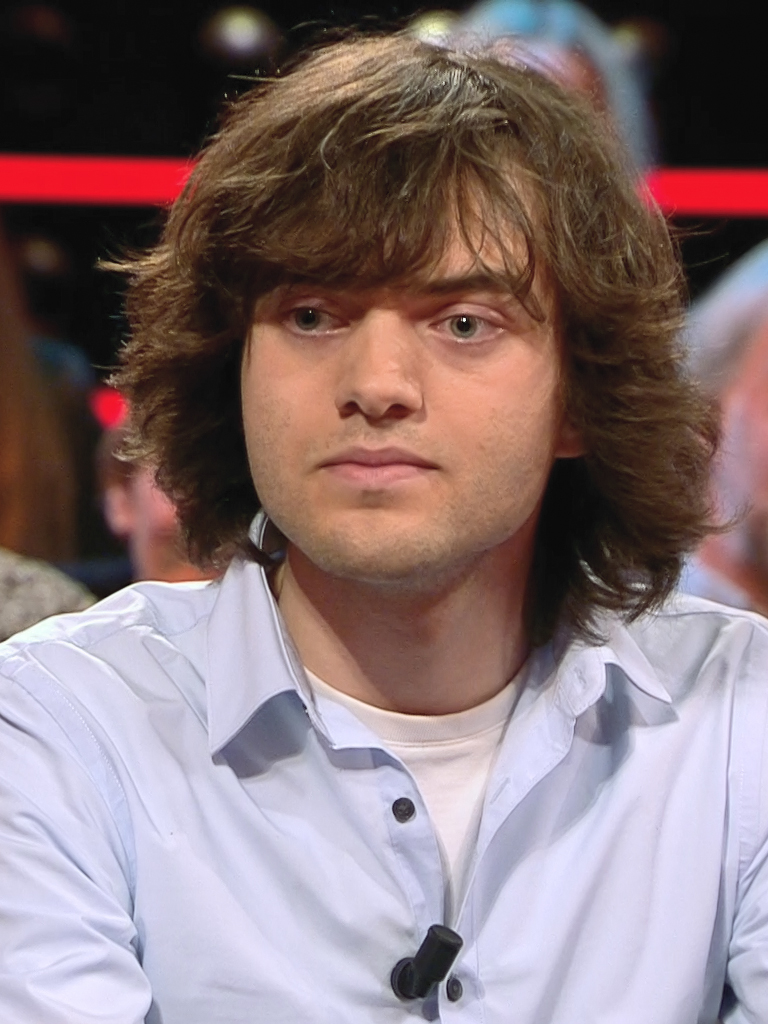
- Slat in 2018
- Born: 27 July 1994 (age 32); Delft, Netherlands
- Occupations: Inventor, entrepreneur
- Known for: The Ocean Cleanup
- Awards: Thiel Fellowship
- Website: theoceancleanup.com/boyan-slat/

Boyan Slat (born 27 July 1994) is a Dutch inventor and entrepreneur. A former aerospace engineering student, he is the CEO of The Ocean Cleanup.

== Initial interest in plastic pollution ==
In 2011, Slat went scuba diving in Greece and found that the amount of plastic surpassed the number of fish in the area he explored. He made ocean plastic pollution the subject of a high school project examining why it was considered nearly impossible to clean up. He later came up with the idea of building a passive plastic catchment system, using circulating ocean currents to net plastic waste, which he presented at a TEDx talk in Delft in 2012.

Slat discontinued his aerospace engineering studies at TU Delft to devote his time to developing his idea. He founded The Ocean Cleanup in 2013, and shortly after, his TEDx talk went viral after being shared on several news sites. In 2017, Slat wrote in The Economist: "Technology is the most potent agent of change. It is an amplifier of our human capabilities ... Whereas other change-agents rely on reshuffling the existing building blocks of society, technological innovation creates entirely new ones, expanding our problem-solving tool-range."

== The Ocean Cleanup ==
In 2013 Slat founded the non-profit The Ocean Cleanup, of which he is the CEO. The group's mission is to develop advanced technologies to rid the world's oceans of plastic. It raised US$2.2 million through a crowd funding campaign with the help of 38,000 donors from 159 countries. In June 2014, the Ocean Cleanup published a 528-page feasibility study about the project's potential. Some declared the concept unfeasible in a technical critique of the feasibility study on the Deep Sea News website, which was cited by other publications, including Popular Science and The Guardian.

Ever since The Ocean Cleanup started, the organization has raised tens of millions of dollars in donations from entrepreneurs in Europe and in Silicon Valley, including Marc Benioff, CEO of Salesforce. In 2026, The Ocean Cleanup was announced as one of The Audacious Project's grantees and was awarded US$121 million to go towards its 30 Cities Program.

=== Cleanup systems ===
The first and second systems, dubbed Systems 001 and 001/B respectively, encountered various technical failures. System 001 was unable to effectively retain plastic and suffered structural stress damage that caused an 18-meter section to break off at one point. However, in 2019, System 001/B, which was a redesign of System 001, successfully captured plastic. This first mission (which includes both systems) returned 60 bags of garbage. In 2022, an updated version of the technology, System 002, removed over 62,000 lbs of plastic. Following the return of System 03 in 2024, the organization announced it had removed over a million pounds of plastic from the Great Pacific Garbage Patch.

=== The Interceptor ===
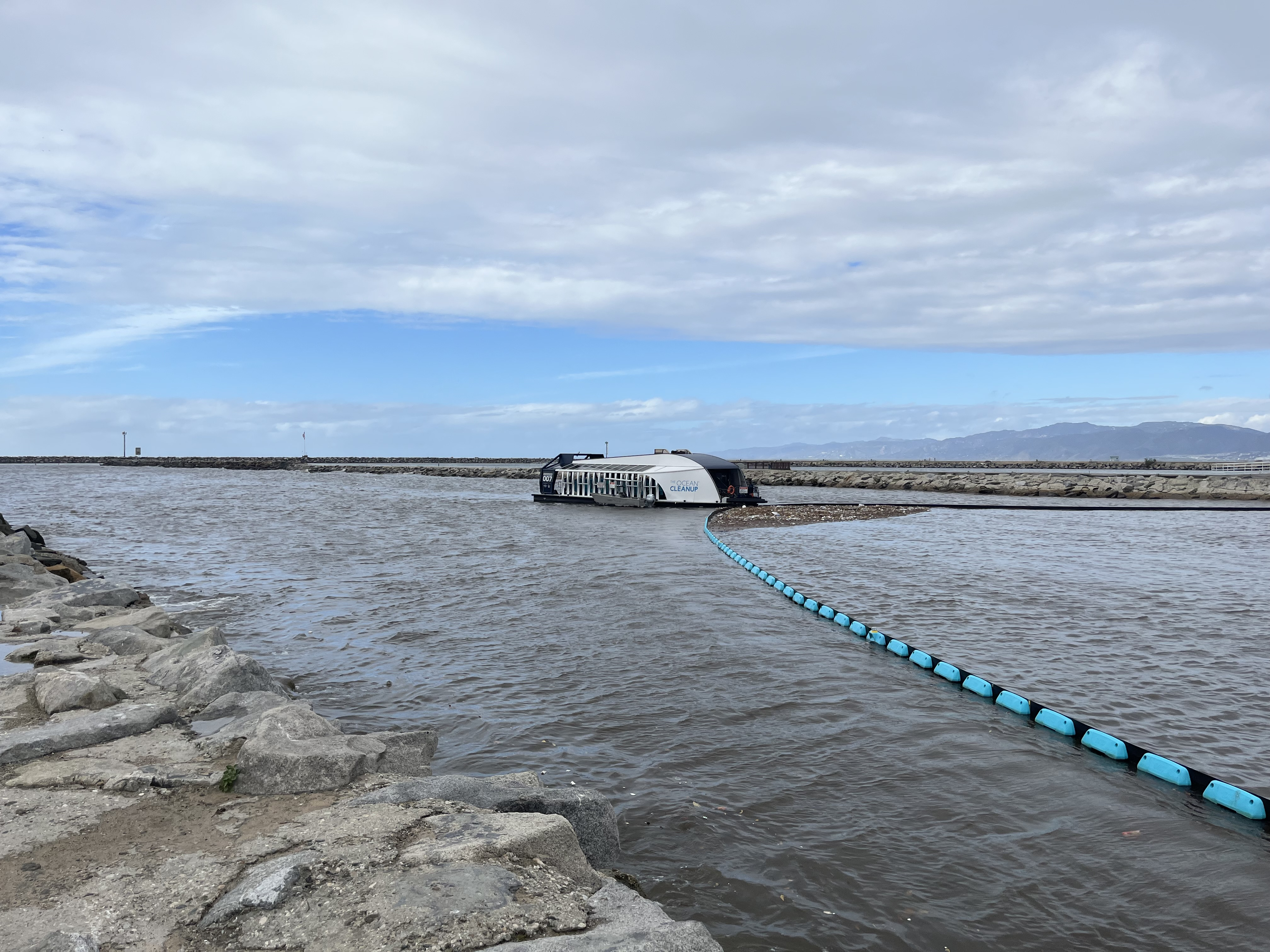
Interceptor 007 in Los Angeles, California.

At an unveiling of a new cleanup system dubbed the Interceptor, Slat cited research from the company which showed that 1,000 of the world's most polluted rivers were responsible for roughly 80% of the world's plastic pollution. In an effort to "close the tap" and drastically reduce the amount of plastic entering the world's oceans, The Ocean Cleanup unveiled a barge-like system that was completely solar powered and was aimed to be a scalable solution that could be deployed around the world's rivers. The organization has since added several types of barrier technologies to the Interceptor portfolio. As of mid 2026, their interceptors have been deployed in Indonesia, Malaysia, the Dominican Republic, Vietnam, Thailand, Guatemala, the United States, Jamaica, Panama, Honduras, India, and the Philippines.

== Awards and recognition ==
- In November 2014, Slat was awarded the Champions of the Earth award of the United Nations Environment Programme.
- King Harald of Norway awarded Slat the Young Entrepreneur Award in 2015.
- Forbes included Slat in their 30 Under 30 list in 2016.
- He was selected for a Thiel Fellowship, a program started in 2011 by venture capitalist and PayPal co-founder Peter Thiel. It gives $100,000 to entrepreneurs 22 years old and younger, who have left or postponed college to work on their start-up.
- In February 2017, Reader's Digest appointed Slat European of the Year, and the Dutch magazine Elsevier awarded him Nederlander van het Jaar 2017 (Dutchman of the Year 2017).
- In 2018, Slat was awarded the Leonardo da Vinci International Art Award and Euronews award "European Entrepreneur of the Year".
- In 2020, Slat was honored with the Future 50 Leaders honoree award by the Project Management Institute.
- In 2024, he was named as one of the 100 most influential people in Time Magazine's Climate list.
- In 2025, Slat featured on Forbes' Sustainability Leaders List, as well as The Independent's Climate 100 List.
- Slat was named to The Independent's Climate 100 List in 2026.

== Personal life ==
Born in the Netherlands, Slat is of Croatian descent through his father.
