= Softwall =

Flexible room divider

softwall
- Designer: Stephanie Forsythe and Todd MacAllen
- Date: 2003
- Materials: paper or nonwoven polyethylene textile, magnets
- Style / tradition: Modern
- Sold by: molo (Canada)
- Height: 6–10 ft (1.8–3.0 m)
- Width: 15 ft (4.6 m)
- Depth: 9–18 in (23–46 cm)

softwall is a flexible room divider designed by Stephanie Forsythe and Todd MacAllen of molo. Made from paper or nonwoven polyethylene, the walls use a structured honeycomb geometry to bend, curve, expand and contract. The honeycomb structure also provides acoustic absorption. Part of a modular system, each softwall can connect to another by magnetic end panels. The walls have been used to create booths for trade fairs, pop-up retail, sculptural art installations, backdrops for performances, as well as to divide space in living and working environments.

In 2003, softwall was welcomed into the Museum of Modern Art’s permanent collection. Two years later, it was presented with the INDEX Award for Design to Improve Life.

== Design ==
Forsythe and MacAllen first conceived softwall as a method for repurposing architectural shells to provide shelter for the homeless. The concept grew into a modular system of space partitions that could quickly and easily transform space to suit diverse uses, whether in small live/work studios or large scale environments.

softwall reflects molo’s interest in sustainable building methods and flexible living. Both the paper and polyethylene textile used for the soft collection are 100% recyclable. These materials are paired with non-toxic fire retardants, adhesives, and inks. By organizing the paper or textile layers with a honeycomb structure, the material takes on strength to create freestanding partitions and the flexibility to adapt to or shape space. The pleated surface and interior cells, which facilitate movement, also absorb sound.
