= Softseating =

Furnishing for seating

softseating
- Designer: Stephanie Forsythe and Todd MacAllen
- Date: 2003
- Materials: paper or nonwoven polyethylene textile, magnets
- Style / tradition: Modern
- Sold by: molo (Canada)

Softseating fanning stool + bench is a furnishing made from paper or textile, designed by Stephanie Forsythe and Todd MacAllen of molo in 2003 and released in 2006. Internal honeycomb geometry allows the elements to store compressed, and then fan open to form seats and tables. Examples of softseating are held in the Museum of Modern Art, the Art Institute of Chicago and the Cooper Hewitt, Smithsonian Design Museum.

== Design ==
The paper or textile materials take on flexibility and strength through an ordered, honeycomb geometry. Depending on the number of layers, the honeycomb creates stools and benches of various sizes. When folded, the furniture can be stored like a book. Magnetic panels set into the final layers of each element allow softseating to connect to itself or to link with other elements to form long benches or creative seating arrangements. Stephanie Forsythe and Todd MacAllen developed the design after considering methods of maximizing small urban spaces for living and working, and how to transform such spaces to suit many types of use.
