= Jane Chen =

American businesswoman

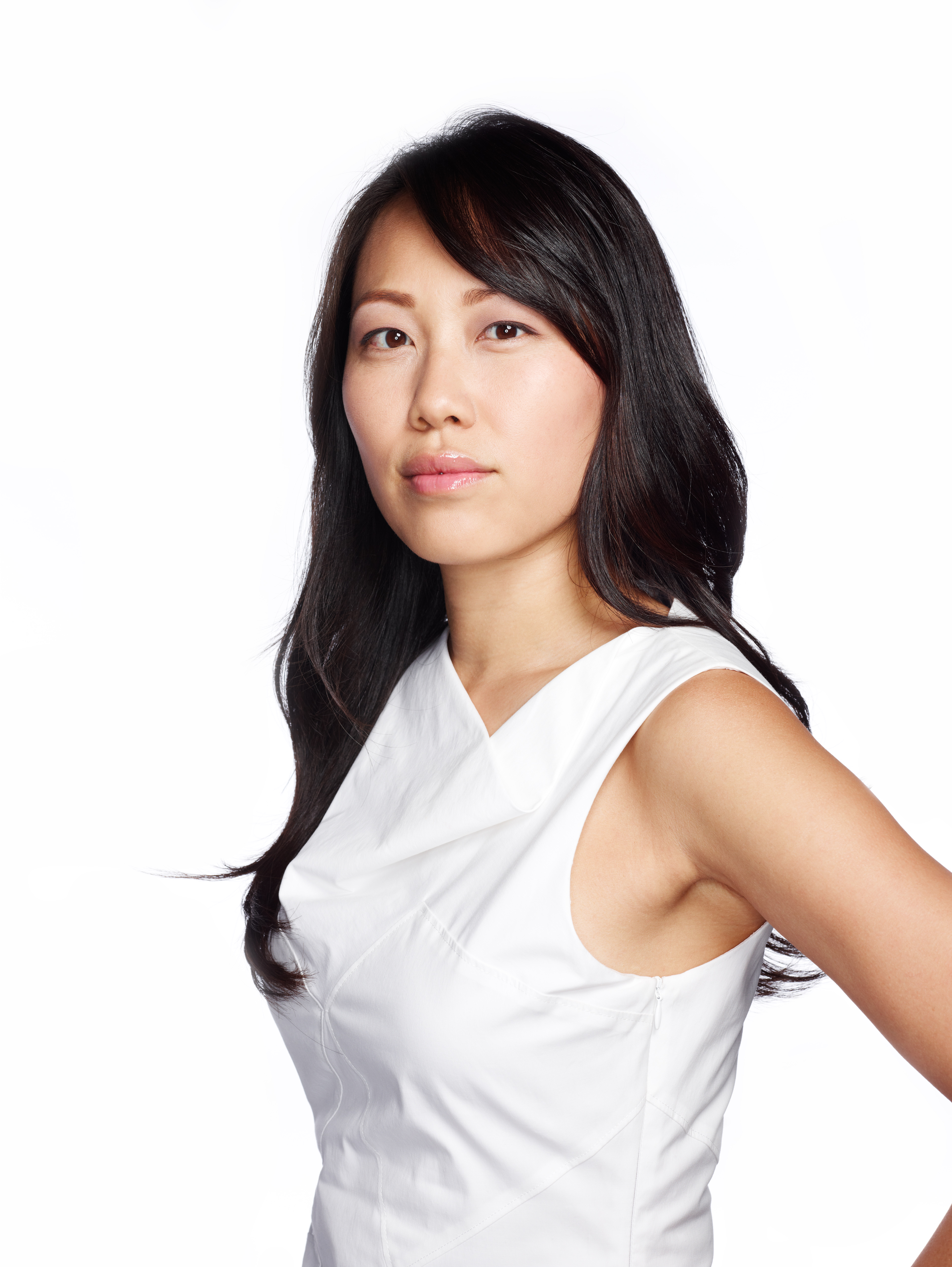
- Chen in 2012
- Born: Jane Marie Chen
- Education: Pomona College (BA); Harvard University (MPA); Stanford University (MBA)
- Occupations: Co-founder and former CEO, Embrace, and Co-founder and CEO, Embrace Innovations
- Known for: Co-founder at Embrace (non-profit)

Jane Marie Chen is an American businesswoman. She is the co-founder of Embrace, a social enterprise that invented and distributes a low-cost infant warmer, that gives premature and low-birth-weight infants a better chance at survival. Chen served as the first CEO of Embrace, the non-profit arm of the organization, before becoming the chief executive officer (CEO) of Embrace Innovations, the for-profit social enterprise that was spun off in 2012.

== Early life and education ==
Chen was born to a Taiwanese American family. She earned a B.A in psychology and economics from Pomona College, a Master of Public Administration (M.P.A.) from Harvard University, and a Master of Business Administration (M.B.A.) from Stanford University.

== Career ==
Prior to Embrace, Chen worked with nonprofit organizations on healthcare issues in developing countries. She spent several years as the program director of a startup HIV/AIDS nonprofit in China, and worked for the Clinton Foundation's HIV/AIDS Initiative in Tanzania. She also worked at Monitor Group as a management consultant.

In 2013, Chen and the other co-founders of Embrace, Linus Liang, Nag Murty, and Rahul Panicker were awarded the Economist Innovation Award, under the category of Social and Economic Innovation. In the same year, Chen and her co-founder Rahul Panicker were also recognized as Schwab Social Entrepreneurs of the Year by the World Economic Forum. In 2014, Chen was invited to the White House's first ever Maker Faire, where she presented Embrace's work to President Obama. In the same year, Beyoncé made a $125,000 contribution through Chime for Change which allowed Embrace to distribute its infant warmers to nine countries in Sub-Saharan Africa.

=== Embrace ===
While doing her MBA at Stanford, Chen and a few other fellow graduate students were assigned a class project to create a low-cost infant incubator that could be used in rural areas. In 2008, they co-founded Embrace, a 501(c)(3) non-profit, to bring their project to life. In January 2012, Embrace moved into a hybrid structure. The non-profit entity, Embrace, donates infant warmers to the neediest areas through NGO partners, and provides educational programs on newborn health alongside the distribution of warmers. The for-profit social enterprise, Embrace Innovations, sells the warmers to paying entities, including governments and private clinics, all focusing on emerging markets. Embrace Innovations, the for-profit social enterprise, raised its Series A round of financing in 2012 from Vinod Khosla's Impact Fund and Capricorn Investment Group. The company raised a second round of investment capital from Marc Benioff in 2014.

In 2016, Embrace Innovations launched a line of consumer baby products called Little Lotus Baby (temperature regulating swaddles and sleeping bags), which have a buy-one give-one model.

== Awards and recognition ==
Chen has been a TED speaker, and was selected as one of Forbes' Impact 30 in 2011. In 2019, Chen was featured in AOL/Verizon/Yahoo's "FUTURIST" Series, profiling industry leaders across all different disciplines who are advancing their fields with technology, innovation, and fearlessness. Chen has been recognized as the Inspirational Young Alumni of the Year by Pomona College, and selected as a "Woman of Distinction" by the American Association of University Women. Chen has spoken at numerous international conferences, including the Skoll World Forum, Bloomberg Design Conference, Forbes Women's Summit, and the World Economic Forum.

In 2012, Chen was named as a Young Global Leader by the World Economic Forum, and was featured in Dove's "Real Role Models" campaign for women and girls. She was also profiled in AOL's Makers campaign. Chen is a TED Fellow, Echoing Green Fellow, and Rainer Arnhold Fellow.

Chen's memoir, Like A Wave We Break, was published by Penguin Random House in October 2025. Like A Wave We Break has garnered praise from influential voices including Tony Robbins, Adam Grant, Bessel van der Kolk, Marc Benioff, Vicky Tsai, Vinod Khosla and many others. The book debuted as a USA Today National Bestseller.
