= Trash interceptor =

Device on a river to capture debris

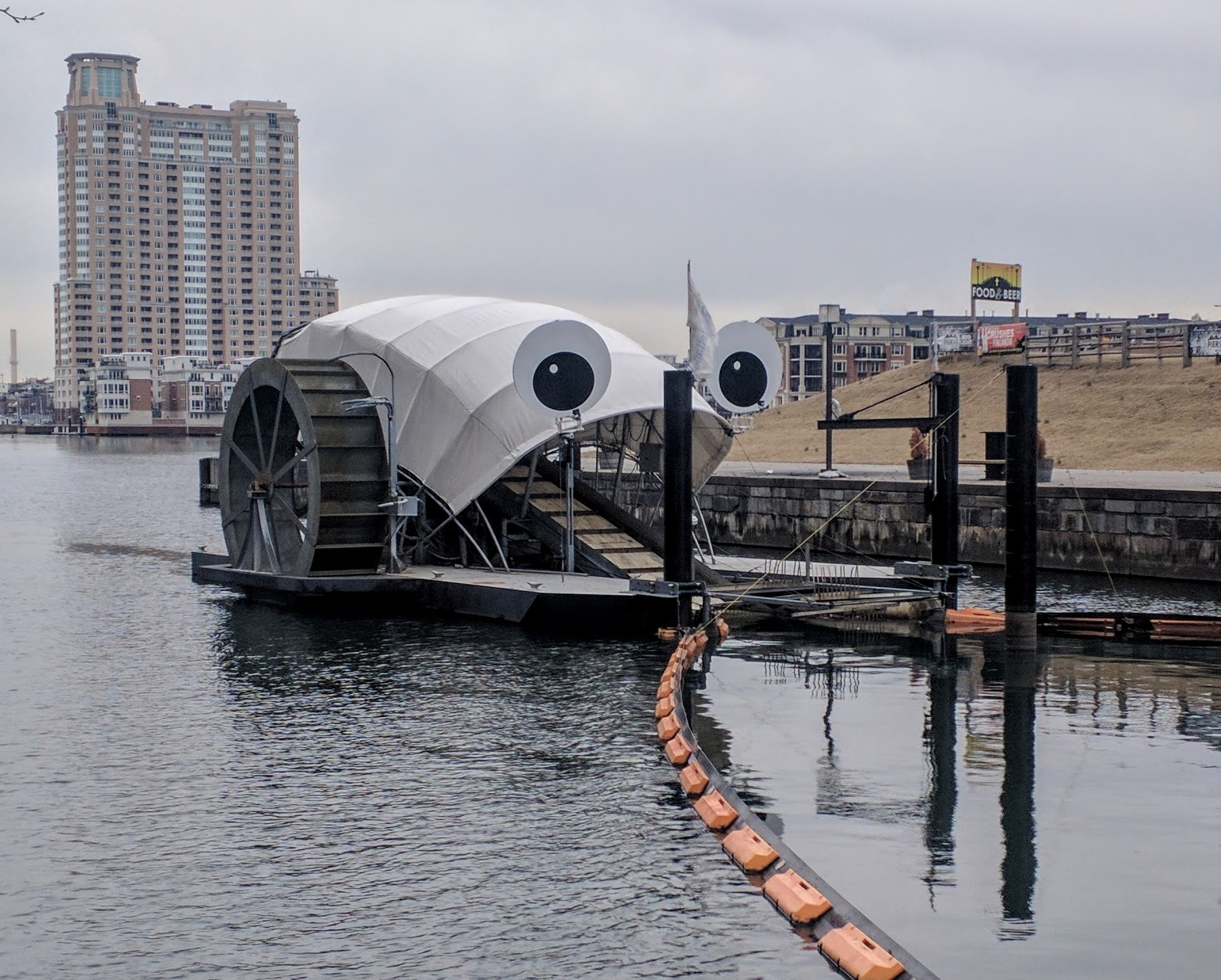
The Mr. Trash Wheel trash interceptor used at the Baltimore Inner Harbor

A trash interceptor is a machinery that can be used for terrain or aquatic to collect and remove debris – before the debris flows out into ocean or harbor waters.

== Mr. Trash Wheel ==
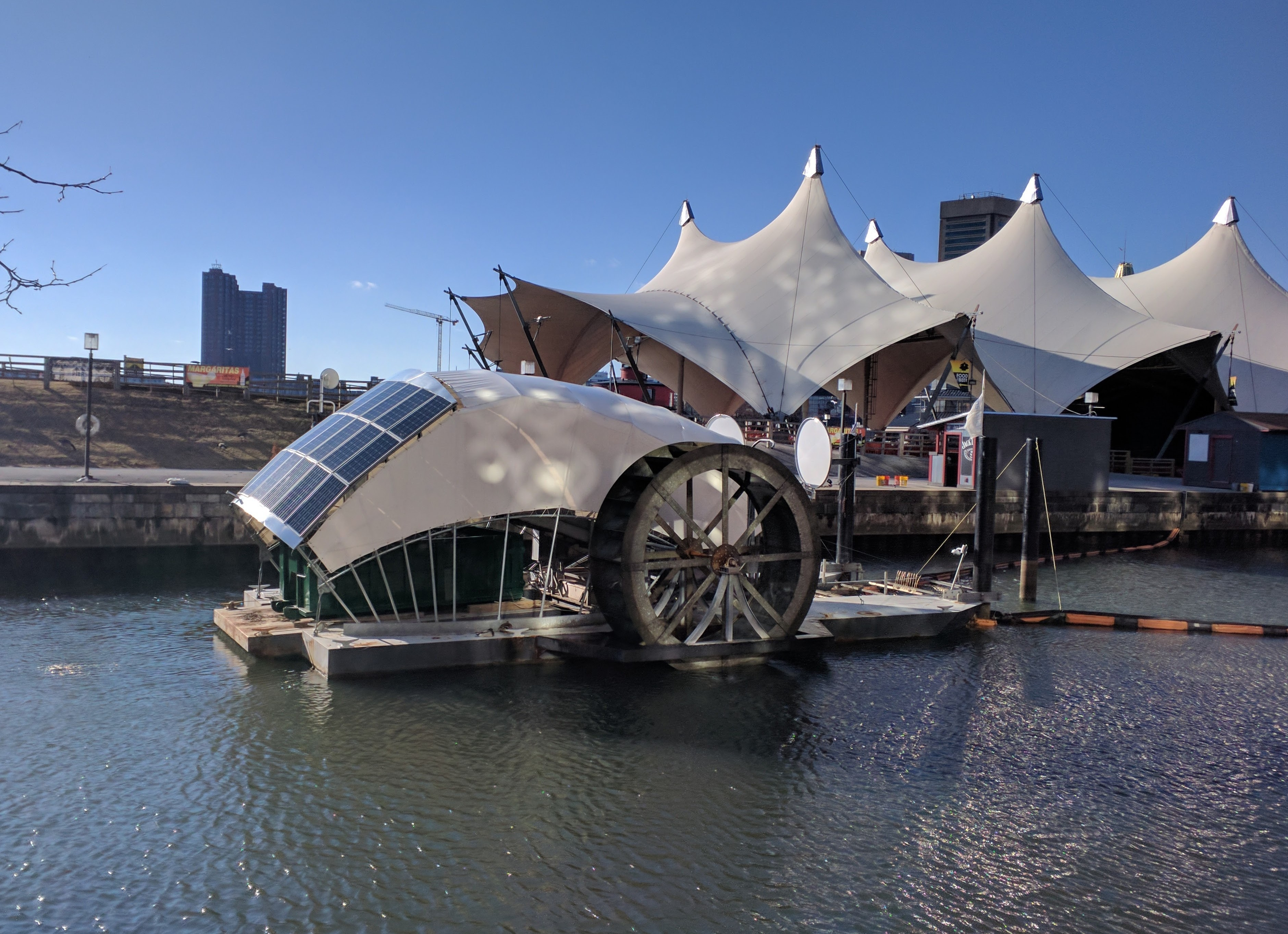
Solar panels on Mr. Trash Wheel's starboard and aft

Installed in May 2014, the water wheel trash interceptor known as Mr. Trash Wheel, officially the Inner Harbor Water Wheel, is the world's first permanent water wheel trash interceptor. It sits at the mouth of the Jones Falls River in Baltimore's Inner Harbor. A February 2015 agreement with a local waste-to-energy plant is believed to make Baltimore the first city to use reclaimed waterway debris to generate electricity.

The Jones Falls river watershed drains fifty-eight square miles of land outside of Baltimore and is a significant source of trash that enters the harbor. Garbage collected by Mr. Trash Wheel could come from anywhere in the watershed. Operated by solar and hydro power, the wheel moves continuously, removing garbage and dumping it into an attached dumpster; its daily capacity is estimated at 25 tons. In its first 18 months of operation, it removed more than 350 tons of litter from Baltimore's landmark and tourist attraction, including approximately 200,000 bottles, 173,000 potato chip bags, and 6.7 million cigarette butts. The water wheel has been very successful at trash removal, visibly decreasing the amount of garbage that collects in the harbor, especially after a rainfall.

After the success of Mr. Trash Wheel, the Waterfront Partnership raised money to build a second water wheel at the end of Harris Creek, an entirely piped stream that flows beneath Baltimore's Canton neighborhood and empties into the Baltimore Harbor. The planned new water wheel was inaugurated in December, 2016, and dubbed "Professor Trash Wheel". Two more trash wheels, "Captain Trash Wheel" and "Gwynnda the Good Wheel of the West", were added in 2018 and 2021 respectively.

== River Thames passive debris collector ==
There are several passive debris collectors (PDCs) on the River Thames in London, including one by the Houses of Parliament. Unlike Baltimore's Mr. Trash Wheel they are totally passive and any debris collected by them must be lifted out by the use of a crane-equipped boat.

== On-Terrain Autonomous debris collector ==
A select few amount of machinery are allowed within the rivers for debris collection. Other machinery that are now being introduce are robotics debris collections machinery like "ACTR" from Astrel to intercept debris before reaching waterways sources and river canals.

== See also ==
- Bubble curtain – used to reduce liquid or debris floating on the surface from spreading
- The Ocean Cleanup – nonprofit environment organization building interceptors for 1,000 rivers
