= Molo (design company) =

Canadian design company

Molo Design Limited, stylized as molo, is a multidisciplinary design and production studio based in Vancouver, British Columbia, Canada led by Stephanie Forsythe and Todd MacAllen. The studio integrates the practices of architecture, craft, and product design. molo products develop from Forsythe and MacAllen's materials research and studies.

== History ==
molo founders, Forsythe and MacAllen met in 1994 while studying architecture at Dalhousie University. The two formed Forsythe + MacAllen Design Associates, and began a series of small projects. In that time they designed and built three houses for private clients, including the Colorado House, which was awarded the inaugural ar+d Award for Emerging Architecture in 1999.

In 2001, they moved to Vancouver and continued their material investigations while developing submissions for architecture and design competitions. That year, they were awarded the Grand Prize in the Aomori Northern Style Housing Competition, juried by Tadao Ando and Jean Nouvel. Over the course of ten years, the designs would develop from a glass housing complex into the completed Aomori Nebuta House, a museum honouring and celebrating the Aomori Nebuta festival. Forsythe and MacAllen designs would continue to win awards, establishing the pair to pursue commercial scale operation.

In 2003, Molo was founded to produce and sell Forsythe and MacAllen's product designs. The name change reflects a growing team of support staff, and comes from "middle ones, little ones," referring to the shift from architectural design to product design. MacAllen has since stated that the distinction is no longer necessary, as he and Forsythe feel that they are simply different words for design at various scales.

== Design intent ==
molo's design philosophy reflects extensive material research and consideration to continual improvement. Products are intended to create space, whether physical or experiential. The design process and materials used are evidence of a philosophy "that products should not only be sustainable themselves, but they should also aid in more sustainable practices in the spaces around them".

The soft collection, a modular system composed of wall partitions, lighting, seating and table elements, is made with textile or paper. Elements use flexible honeycomb geometry to bend, shift, expand, and collapse for ease of storage. The collection is an evolutionary step in Forsythe and MacAllen's designs for softroom and softshelter, concepts which address issues of temporary housing for the homeless or disaster relief.

Elements of the soft collection have been added to the permanent collection of the Museum of Modern Art, the Art Institute of Chicago, and the Cooper Hewitt, Smithsonian Design Museum. They have also been featured in exhibitions at the Centre of Arts Caja de Burgos, the Museum of Vancouver, the Vancouver Art Gallery and the Gardiner Museum. In 2005, softwall was also honoured with an INDEX: Design to Improve Life award for the Home Category. Soft is protected by a series of international patents and design registrations.

== Awards ==
- Chicago Athenaeum International Architecture Award for Nebuta House (2011)
- ar+d Award for Emerging Architecture for Aomori Nebuta House (2011)
- Architectural Record Design Vanguard (2010)
- Winner, "Best Exhibit", ICFF Editor's Choice Awards, International Contemporary Furniture Fair (2010)
- MIPIM Architectural Review Future Project Award for Aomori Nebuta House (2010)
- Winner, "Body of Work", ICFF Editor's Choice Awards, International Contemporary Furniture Fair (2006)
- Winner, "Best New Designer", ICFF Editor's Choice Award, International Contemporary Furniture Fair (2004)
- Winning Entry, First Step Housing Competition, Organized by Common Ground Community and the Architectural League of New York (2003)
- First Prize, LighTouch Competition, Organized by Design Singapore (2003)
- Golden Prize, Design Beyond East and West Housing competition (2003)
- Winning Entry, Young Architects Forum Competition: "Inhabiting Identity", Architectural League of New York (2003)
- ar+d award for Emerging Architecture for float tea lantern (2002)
- First prize, Aomori Northern Style Housing Competition (2001)
- ar+d Award for Emerging Architecture, for Colorado House (1999)
