= Benioff =

Benioff is a surname. Notable people with the surname include:

- David Benioff (born 1970), American writer, screenwriter and television producer
- Hugo Benioff (1899–1968), American seismologist and academic
  - Wadati–Benioff zone
- Marc Benioff (born 1964), American businessman, founder of Salesforce
- Paul Benioff (1930–2022), physicist, quantum computing pioneer
