= The Ocean Cleanup =

Dutch nonprofit that alleviates plastic pollution

- Formation: 2013; 13 years ago
- Founded at: Delft, Netherlands
- Type: Stichting
- Headquarters: Rotterdam, Netherlands
- Coordinates: 51°55′25″N 4°28′43″E
- Services: Ocean cleanup systems; River Interceptors; Plastic recycling and reuse; Research and monitoring; Global partnerships
- CEO: Boyan Slat
- Budget: €54.705 million (2022)
- Staff: 150
- Website: www.theoceancleanup.com

The Ocean Cleanup is a Dutch nonprofit organization based in the Netherlands that develops technologies intended to reduce plastic pollution in oceans and rivers. Founded in 2013 by Boyan Slat, the group focuses on two main approaches: large offshore collection systems designed for accumulation zones such as the Great Pacific Garbage Patch, and land‑based “Interceptor” devices deployed in rivers to capture waste before it reaches the sea. The organization’s work has received extensive media attention and has been the subject of both support and criticism.

The Ocean Cleanup has conducted many prototype trials since 2018, iterating on its offshore system and expanding its rive program to several countries. The organization publishes operational data and environmental assessments, while external studies continue to evaluate ecological impact and long-term performance of large-scale cleanup systems.

As of 2026, the project remains one of the most visible attempts to engineer technological solutions to global plastic pollution, operating through a combination of philanthropic funding, corporate partnerships, and public donations. In July 2026, the organization announced it had removed over 60 million kilograms (60,000 metric tons) of trash from rivers and the Great Pacific Garbage Patch.

== History ==
The Ocean Cleanup project was founded in 2013 by Dutch inventor Boyan Slat after presenting a concept for passive ocean cleaning at a TED-talk the previous year. The organization began as a small volunteer initiative before receiving crowd funding and other support that enabled early engineering studies and feasibility assessments. Independent reporting at the time noted both enthusiasm for the idea and skepticism from scientists as to whether large scale clean-up systems could operate in open ocean environments.

Between 2014 and 2017, the group conducted numerical modeling, scale-modeling tests, and coastal trials to determine how floating barriers behave in waves and currents.

=== 2014–2017: Initial prototypes ===
The barriers would direct the floating plastic to the central platform, which would remove the plastic from the water.the design consisted of a tower detached from the floating barriers. This platform would collect the plastic using a conveyor belt. The floating barrier was proposed to be 100 km (62 mi) long. They conducted and published a feasibility study.

In 2015, this design won the London Design Museum Design of the Year, and the INDEX: Award. Later that year, scale model tests were conducted in wave pools at Deltares and MARIN, testing the dynamics and load of the barrier in ocean conditions, and gathering data for computational modeling. According to later reporting, the development process ultimately involved testing 273 scale models and six distinct prototypes before the organization finalized the design that preceded System 001.

A 100-metre (330 ft) segment went through a test in the North Sea in the summer of 2016. The test indicated that conventional oil containment booms would not stand up over time, and they changed the floater material to a hard-walled HDPE pipe.

In May 2017 changes to the conceptual design were made. This included reducing the length of the boom from 100 km (62 mi) to 2 km (1.2 mi) to increase unit scalability, replacing seabed anchors with sea anchors to allow it to drift with currents, and replacing the automatic system for removing accumulated plastic with a manual one.

=== System 001 ===
Top view of the floating barrier: A - navigation pod B - satellite pod C - camera pod (There are also nine lanterns situated every 100 metres along the barrier to provide visibility.)

On 9 September 2018, System 001 deployed from San Francisco. The ship Maersk Launcher towed the system to a position 240 nautical miles off the coast, where it was put through a series of sea trials. It consisted of a 600 m (2,000 ft) long barrier with a 3 m (9.8 ft) wide skirt hanging beneath it. It was unmanned and incorporated solar-powered monitoring and navigation systems, including GPS, cameras, lanterns and AIS.

In October 2018 it was towed to the Great Pacific Garbage Patch for real-world duty. System 001 encountered difficulties retaining the plastic collected. The system collected debris, but soon lost it because the barrier did not retain a consistent speed through the water. In December, mechanical stress caused an 18-meter section to detach, and the rig was moved to Hawaii for inspection and repair. During the two months of operation, it had captured 2 metric tons of plastic.

In June 2019, after four months of root cause analyses and redesign, System 001/B was deployed, with a water-borne parachute to slow the system, and an extended cork line to hold the screen in place. This successfully captured smaller plastic, reduced the barrier size by two-thirds, and was easier to adjust offshore. However, System 001/B still did not adequately capture and retain debris.

=== Interceptors ===
In October 2019, The Ocean Cleanup announced the Interceptor, a solar-powered system designed to remove plastic from rivers before it reaches the ocean. The first two Interceptor units were deployed in Klang (Malaysia) and Jakarta (Indonesia).

In January 2020, flooding broke the barrier of Interceptor 001 in Jakarta. It was replaced with a newer model with a stronger screen, simpler design, and an adjustable better-defined weak link.

In 2021, Interceptor systems were enhanced to be able to tackle a wider range of rivers. The Interceptor 006 (Barricade) was deployed in 2023 on the Rio Vaca, in Guatemala, its first high-volume river. Following strong rainfall in April 2024, the Interceptor Barricade successfully captured 1,400,000 kg of waste in a matter of hours.

In October 2022, an Interceptor Original was deployed near the mouth of Ballona Creek in southwestern Los Angeles County, California. This installation was the first Interceptor Original in the United States.

The system in Ballona Creek in Los Angeles cost about $1.3 million to design and permit, and $1.5 million for the barges and installation. Annual costs approach $650,000. OC covers these costs. Ballona Creek drains ~130 sq mi (340 km^{2}) of urban land. This system collected 143,710 pounds of trash in 2025, reducing the need for beach cleanups and other mitigations.

As of 2026, 26 Interceptor systems operated in the Dominican Republic, Guatemala, Honduras, India, Indonesia, Jamaica, Malaysia, Panama, the Philippines, Thailand, the United States, and Vietnam. Here's a list:

Nr.	Model	Deployment	Location	Country	Status
001	Interceptor 1st Gen	April 1, 2019	Cengkareng Drain, Jakarta	Indonesia	in operation
002	Interceptor 2nd Gen	September 20, 2019	Klang River, Klang	Malaysia	in operation
003	Interceptor 2nd Gen	December 10, 2021	Can Tho River, Can Tho	Vietnam	in operation
004	Interceptor 2nd Gen	October, 2019	Rio Ozama, Santo Domingo	Dominican Republic	operation paused
005	Interceptor 3rd Gen	March, 2022	Klang River, Klang	Malaysia	in maintenance
006	Interceptor Barricade	June 14, 2023	Las Vacas River, Guatemala City	Guatemala	in operation
007	Interceptor 3rd Gen	October 6, 2022	Ballona Creek, Los Angeles	U.S.A.	in operation
008	Interceptor Guard	November 24, 2021	Rae Town Gully/Franklyn Town Gully, Kingston	Jamaica	in operation
009	Interceptor Barrier	November 20, 2021	Kingston Pen Gully, Kingston	Jamaica	in operation
010	Interceptor Barrier	November 26, 2021	Barnes Gully, Kingston	Jamaica	in operation
011	Interceptor Barrier	December 15, 2022	Tivoli Gully, Kingston	Jamaica	in operation
012	Interceptor Guard	July 1, 2023	D'Aguilar Gully, Kingston	Jamaica	in operation
013	Interceptor Barrier	November 16, 2023	Mountain View Gully, Kingston	Jamaica	in operation
014	Interceptor Guard	November 21, 2023	Shoemaker Gully, Kingston	Jamaica	in operation
015	Interceptor Guard	November 7, 2024	Sandy Gully, Kingston	Jamaica	in operation
016	Interceptor Guard	April 16, 2025	Balmagie Gully, Kingston	Jamaica	in operation
017					
018					
019	Interceptor 3rd Gen	March 25, 2024	Chao Phraya, Bangkok	Thailand	in operation
020	Interceptor 3rd Gen	April 15, 2025	Cisadane River, Jakarta	Indonesia	in operation
021	Interceptor Barricade	August 13, 2024	Motagua River, El Quetzalito	Guatemala	in operation
022	Interceptor Guard	December 1, 2025	Rio Abajo, Panama City	Panama	in operation
023	Interceptor Guard	September 1, 2025	Rio Chamelecon, San Pedro Sula	Honduras	installed for testing
024	Interceptor Guard	January 1, 2026	Rio Juan Diaz, Panama City	Panama	installed for testing
025	Interceptor Guard	April 20, 2026	Rio Matias Hernandez, Panama City	Panama	installed for testing
026	Interceptor Guard	May 21, 2026	Trombay Creek, Mumbai	India	installed for testing
027	Interceptor Guard	June 5, 2026	Malad Creek, Mumbai	India	installed for testing
028	Interceptor Barrier	July 1, 2026	Meycauayan River, Manila	Philippines	installed for testing

=== System 002 and 03 ===
Its ocean system consists of a funnel shaped floating barrier which is towed by two ships. The ocean system is deployed in oceanic gyres to collect marine debris. The project aims to launch 10 or more approximately 2 km-long (1.2 mi) systems which they predict could remove 50% of the debris in the Great Pacific Garbage Patch

In July 2021, a new design called System 002 was deployed in the Great Pacific Garbage Patch for testing. System 002 was actively towed by two ships as opposed to System 001 which passively drifted. In October 2021, the organization announced that the system had gathered 28,000 kilograms (62,000 lb) of trash, and announced plans for System 03, which would span up to 2.5 km (1.6 mi).

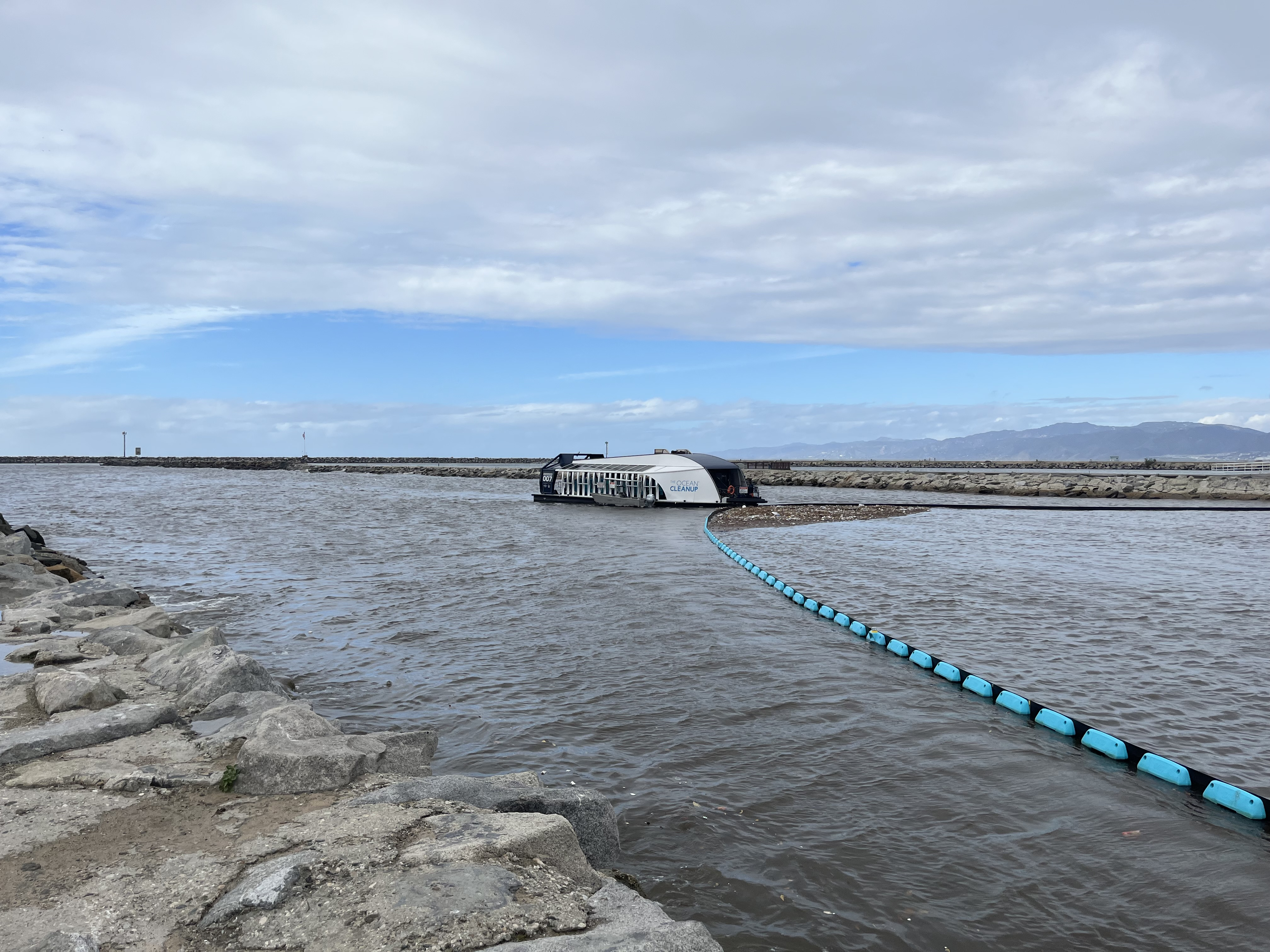
Interceptor 007 at Los Angeles, California removed 77 tons of trash in the 2023 storm season

By December, the project announced it had removed more than 150 tonnes of plastic from the Great Pacific Garbage Patch and announced it would transition to the new longer System 03 the following year.

In May 2023, the project deployed its System 03 barrier, 2,250 meters long. The system incorporated design changes intended to reduce ecological impacts, including modifications to the retention area and the addition of a marine animal escape mechanism.

In June 2024, the project claimed that it had removed 15 million kilograms (33 million lb) of marine trash from the Great Pacific Garbage Patch and from key polluting rivers around the world since 2019.

=== The 30 Cities Program ===
At the United Nations Oceans Conference in 2025, the Ocean Cleanup announced it was launching the 30 Cities Program, an initiative to stop up to 1/3 of all plastic pollution coming from rivers into the ocean by 2030 by targeting 30 of the world's most polluting urban centers.

== Design ==
=== Ocean system ===
A side view diagram: A: Wind B: Waves C: Current D: Floating barrier

The 03 design uses a towed floating structure. The structure acts as a containment boom. A permeable screen underneath the float catches subsurface debris and funnels it into the Retention Zone which serves as a debris catch. The Retention Zone is monitored by underwater cameras. If an animal is spotted in the Retention Zone, the Marine Animal Safety Hatch (MASH) is activated, blocking off any further entrance into the Retention Zone while opening an exit hatch and giving the animal a clear route out.

Crewed boats tow the approximately 2.2 km U-shaped barrier through the water at 1.5 knots. The ship is steered to areas with higher waste densities. As of August 2025, the floating system has removed almost 500,000 kg of plastic from the Great Pacific Garbage Patch.

=== River system ===
An Interceptor Barricade system consists of two barges. A V-shaped floating boom directs flotsam into one barge. An automated shuttle then transfers it into six dumpsters on the other barge, with total capacity of around a single dump truck, all powered by overhead-mounted solar panels. The material is then directed to refuse facilities.

The Interceptor project is similar to a smaller-scale local project called Mr. Trash Wheel developed in 2008 for Maryland's Baltimore harbor.

== Research ==
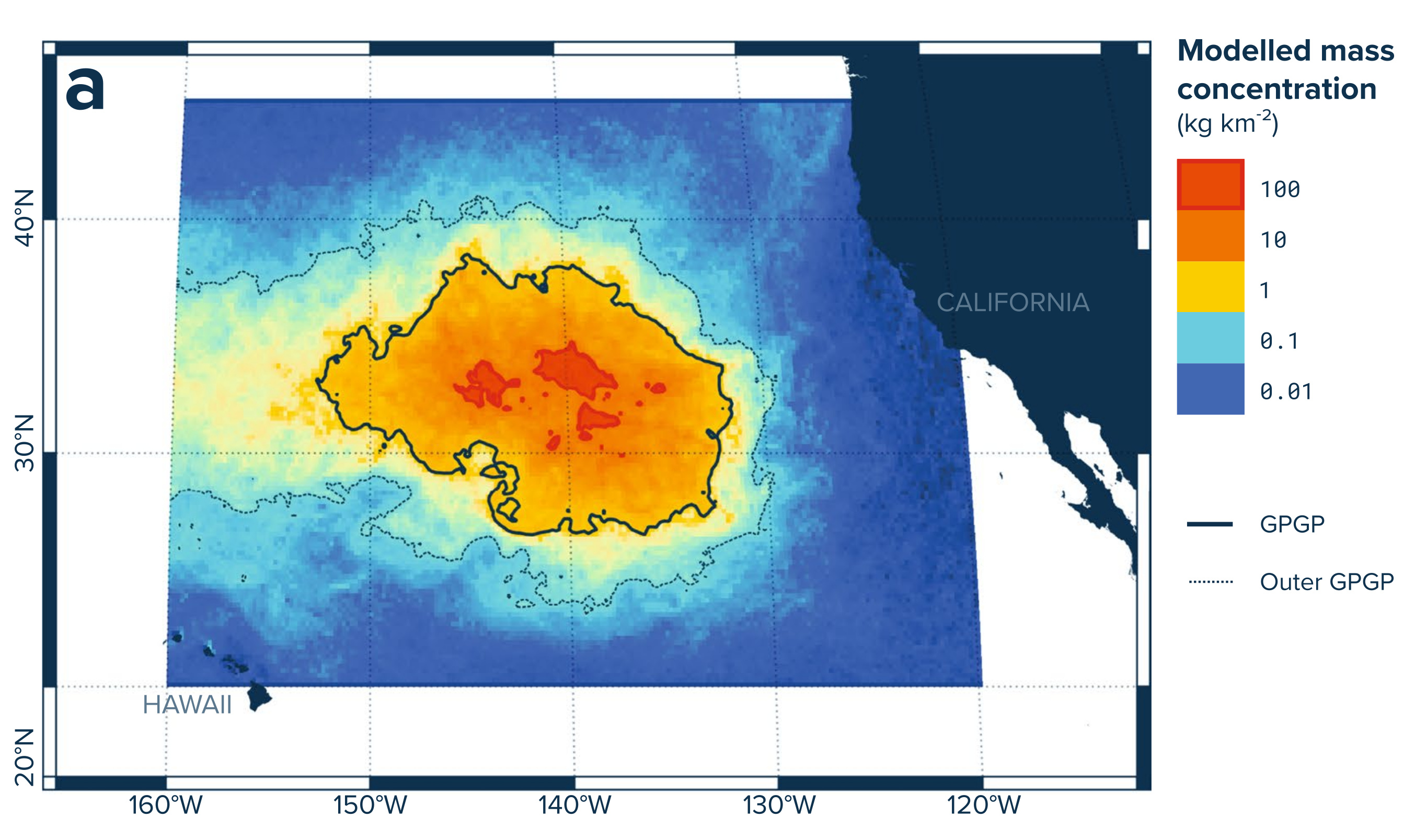
Ocean plastic mass concentrations for August 2015

In August 2015, The Ocean Cleanup conducted a "mega expedition", during which a fleet of around 30 vessels, led by the R/V Ocean Starr, collected plastic samples across the Great Pacific Garbage Patch in an effort to reassess the scale and composition of the debris.

In September and October 2016, The Ocean Cleanup launched the Aerial Expedition, in which a C-130 Hercules aircraft conducted the first ever series of aerial surveys to map the Great Pacific Garbage Patch. The goal was specifically to quantify the amount of large debris, including ghost nets in the patch. Slat stated that the crew saw more debris than expected.

The project released an app called The Ocean Cleanup Survey App, which enables others to survey the ocean for plastic, and report their observations.

== Funding ==
The Ocean Cleanup raised over US$2 million with the help of a crowdfunding campaign in 2014.

As of 2019, it was mainly funded by donations and in-kind sponsors, including Maersk, Salesforce.com chief executive Marc Benioff, Peter Thiel, Julius Baer Foundation, The Coca-Cola Company and Royal DSM.

In 2019, it received a 10 million AUD award from the Macquarie Group Foundation as part of its 50th anniversary celebration.

In October 2020, they unveiled a product made from plastic certified from the Great Pacific Garbage Patch, The Ocean Cleanup sunglasses, to help fund the continuation of the cleanup. They made 21,000 sunglasses, sold at €200 apiece. They worked with DNV GL to develop a certification for plastic from water sources and the sunglasses were certified to originate from the GPGP. The sunglasses were designed by Yves Béhar and manufactured by Safilo. They sold out in early 2022.

In October 2021, they were part of the #TeamSeas fundraising campaign led by YouTube celebrities Mark Rober and MrBeast, and received roughly half of the $30 million raised.

In 2022, Kia signed a seven-year deal to become a global partner of The Ocean Cleanup through funding and in-kind contributions. The partnership will fund the construction of a new Interceptor and will allow for recycled plastics to be used in the manufacturing process of Kia.

In early 2023 the organization received its largest private donation to date of $25 million from Joe Gebbia, co-founder of Airbnb.

In 2026, The Ocean Cleanup was announced as one of The Audacious Project's 2025 grantees. The organization received its largest single donation to date from Audacious' donor pool, $121 million, which will go towards implementing their 30 Cities Program.

== Efficacy issues and possible negative impacts ==
Criticisms and doubts about method, feasibility, efficiency and return on investment have been raised in the scientific community. Miriam Goldstein, director of ocean policy at the Center for American Progress, stated in 2019 that compared to the ocean system, devices closer to shore are easier to maintain, and would likely recover more plastic per dollar spent overall.

The team has expressed their own concerns that the devices could imperil sea life, including neustons, communities of pleustons, Portuguese man-of-war, sea snails, and sail jellyfish that live near the ocean surface, and have monitored for such impacts. A modelling study concluded that it is currently impossible to determine how damaging at-sea plastic removal strategies (such as those of The Ocean Cleanup) would be for marine life, with impacts potentially ranging from mild to severe. In 2025, The Ocean Cleanup published a peer-reviewed environmental assessment of its activities, which concluded that the modeled benefits of ocean plastic removal outweighed the associated environmental costs, including greenhouse gas emissions and ecosystem impacts.

It is understood that this approach alone cannot solve the whole problem. Plastic in the oceans is spread far beyond the gyres; experts estimate that less than 5% of all the plastic pollution which enters the oceans makes its way into any of the garbage patches, with the majority of plastic waste ending up on coastlines and beaches.

== Recognition ==
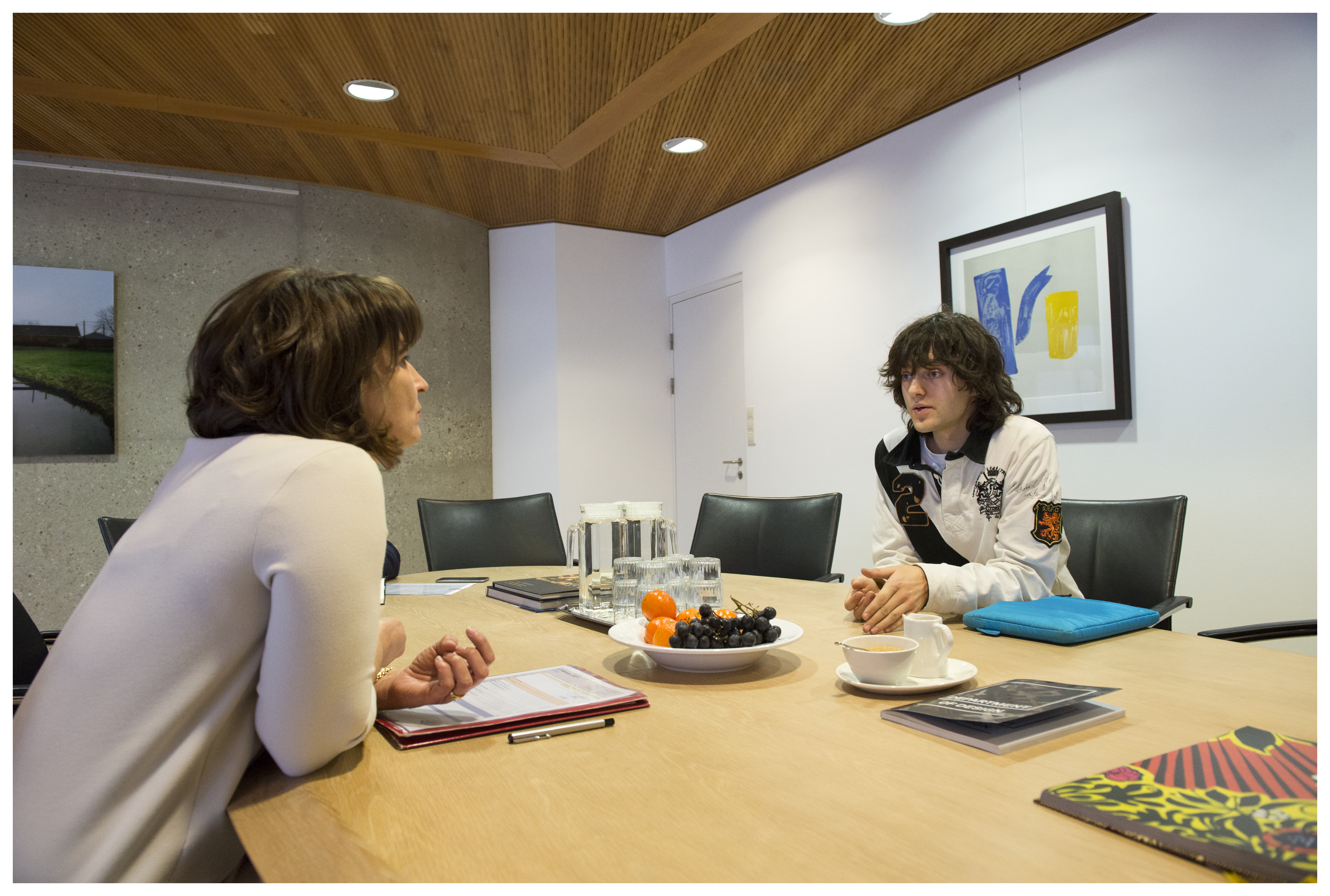
Lilianne Ploumen, Dutch minister of foreign trade and development cooperation, meets with Boyan Slat.

The project and its founder have been recognized in many fora.

- 2014 Champion of the Earth – The United Nations Environment Programme.
- One of the 20 Most Promising Young Entrepreneurs Worldwide – Intel EYE50.
- 2015 London Design Museum Design of the Year.
- 2015 INDEX: Award.
- 2015 Fast Company Innovation By Design Award in the category Social Good.
- 2015 100 Global Thinkers — Foreign Policy.
- 2016 Katerva award.
- 2017 Norwegian Shipowners' Association's Thor Heyerdahl award.
- 2019 Macquarie 50th Anniversary Award.
- 2020 Dutch Design Awards.
- 2024 Time100 Climate.

== See also ==
- Marine plastic pollution – Environmental pollution by plastics
- Mr. Trash Wheel – Water-wheel vessel
- Ocean Conservancy – Nonprofit environmental advocacy group
- Oceanic Society – US-based non-profit organization
- TerraCycle – American industrial company
