= Embrace Innovations =

- Company type: Private
- Industry: Healthcare Technology
- Founded: 1 January 2011
- Founder: Jane Chen, Linus Liang, Naganand (Nag) Murty and Rahul Panicker
- Headquarters: Bangalore, India
- Products: Embrace Nest, Embrace Care
- Website: embraceinnovations.com

Embrace Innovations is an Indian healthcare technology company specializing in infant warmers. The company produces neonatal warming bags which are used to help reduce the risk of hypothermia in pre-term infants.

== History ==
Embrace was founded in 2008 by Jane Chen, Linus Liang, Naganand Murty and Rahul Panicker. The four founders met as graduate students at Stanford University in a Design for Extreme Affordability course, where they were challenged to design an infant incubator that would cost 1% the price of traditional incubators (about $20,000 in the US).

On a 2007 fact-finding trip to Nepal and India, the team realised their design would have to take into account the infrastructural challenges in developing countries, including unreliable power and limited skills of healthcare staff. An initial prototype was developed resembling a baby sleeping bag with a removable, heatable wax insert that prevented hypothermia in premature and low-birth-weight babies, which took into account the limitations of the developing country environment.

With initial funding from Stanford BASES Social E-Challenge and Echoing Green, Embrace was registered as a 501(c)(3) non-profit in 2008. In 2009, the team moved to Bangalore, India to further refine their prototypes and explore their intended market. Clinical trials began in 2010. The first Embrace infant warmer was delivered to Little Flower Hospital in Bangalore, India in April 2011, marking the launch of pilot programs in India. In late 2011, Embrace partnered with the American Refugee Committee and Banadir Hospital in Mogadishu, Somalia to implement the first pilot program in Africa.

In 2011, Embrace Innovations closed a Series-A funding round, with investments from Vinod Khosla's Impact Fund and Capricorn Investment Group.

In January 2012, Embrace announced its new hybrid organisational structure, in which separate for-profit social enterprise, Embrace Innovations, was separated from the nonprofit Embrace 501(c)(3) organisation. The for-profit company would is tasked with handling product design, manufacturing, and sales/distribution, primarily to governments and private clinics in emerging markets. Under the curren structure, the nonprofit owns the intellectual property for the company's products and is paid by the for-profit arm via royalties. each warmer sold, the for-profit arm pays a royalty to the nonprofit, which owns the intellectual property; these royalties are in turn spent on charitable functions such as the provision of infant warmers to under-resourced and impoverished communities. According to the company, this combined approach "allows [Embrace] to divide and conquer, to reach a broader range of demographics and areas".

== Products ==
The company produces two infant warmers called Embrace Nest, and Embrace Care. Both utilize a sleeping bag style pouch for the infant and are designed to be used to complement the so-called "skin to skin" technique of infant warming.
