= Rahul Panicker =

Indian technologist

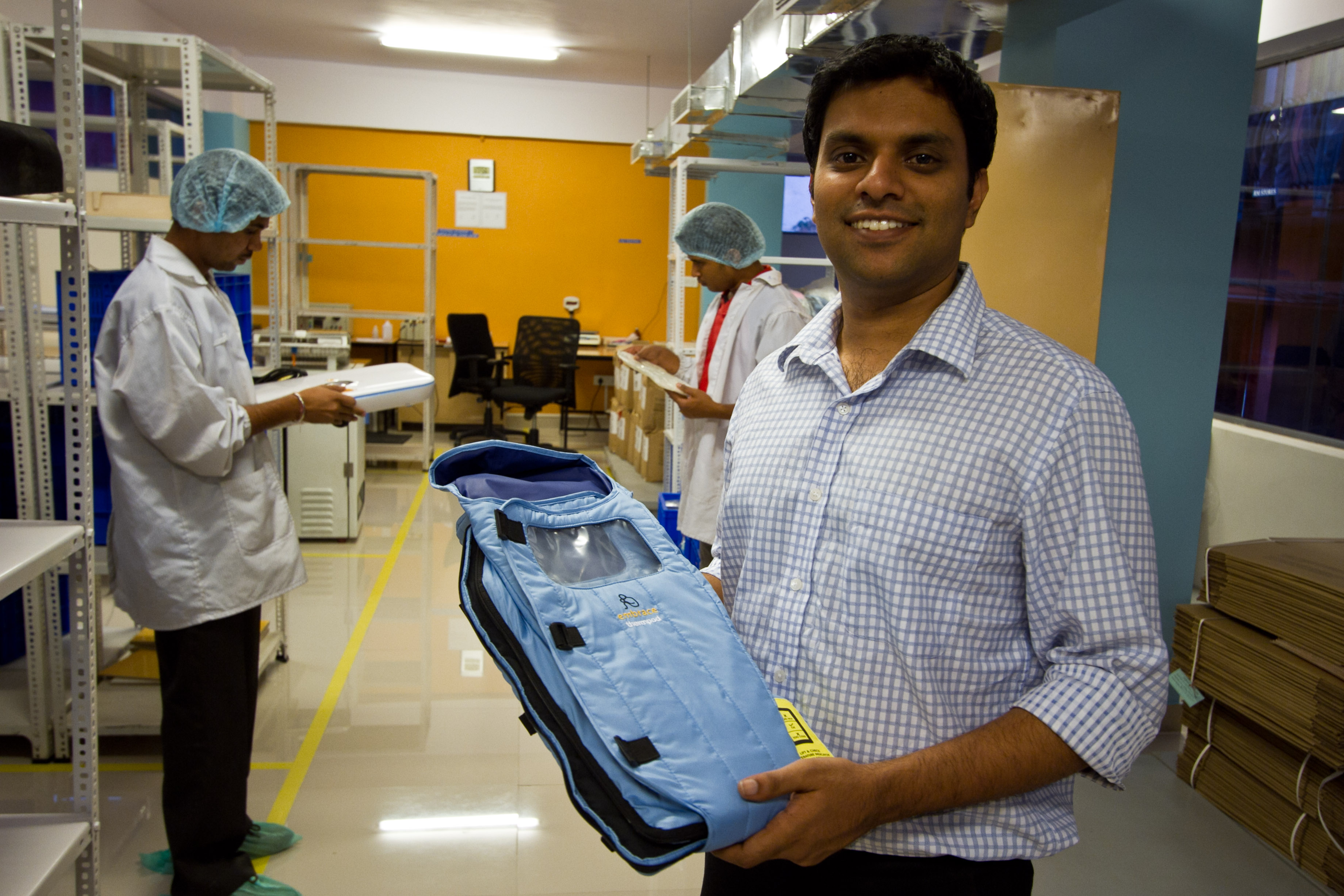
- Born: Mavelikkara, Kerala, India
- Education: Indian Institute of Technology Madras (IIT Madras) (B.Tech); Stanford University Stanford Department of Electrical Engineering (MS, 2004; Ph.D., 2008)
- Occupations: President and Co-founder Embrace Innovations
- Known for: Co-founder at Embrace, and President and Co-founder at Embrace Innovations

Rahul Alex Panicker is a technology leader and entrepreneur, formerly Chief Innovation Officer at the Wadhwani Institute for Artificial Intelligence, and best known as the President and Co-founder of Embrace Innovations and Embrace, a social enterprise startup that aims to help premature and low-birth-weight babies, through a low-cost infant warmer.

Until early 2016, Panicker served as the President of Embrace Innovations, a social enterprise that designs and brings to market healthcare technologies for the developing world, starting with an infant warmer. The Embrace infant warmer costs less than 1% of a traditional incubator, and is currently being distributed across clinics in India, and over 15 developing countries. He is also a member of the FICCI Health Innovation Task Force in India. Starting 2016, he has been engaged in exploring and speaking about the potential impact of AI and what societies can do to prepare for the future, including at TEDx IIT Kharagpur.

== Early life and education ==
Panicker was born in Mavelikara, Kerala, India to Moly and P.C. Mathen Panicker of Kottarakara. He attended Indian Community School, Kuwait, and Sarvodaya Vidyalaya, Trivandrum, India, and hails from Vayalikada, Thiruvananthapuram.

Panicker holds an M.S. and Ph.D. from Stanford Department of Electrical Engineering, and a B.Tech from Indian Institute of Technology Madras (IIT Madras), India. He is also an alumnus of the design school at Stanford.

As part of his Ph.D. at Stanford, Panicker worked at the interface of machine learning and optics. His thesis work used machine learning techniques to demonstrate a 10 to 100 fold increase in capacity of multimode optical communication systems. His work combined convex optimization, machine learning, adaptive optics and spatial light modulators. He also worked at the SLAC National Accelerator Laboratory, applying artificial neural networks to accelerator-beam controls.

== Career ==
Before starting Embrace, Panicker worked briefly at Infinera Corporation. While there, he worked in a team led by co-founder, President, and member of the Infinera Board, David F. Welch, Ph.D., in the new products group, working on ultra hi-speed optical telecom systems.

=== Embrace ===
In 2007, while studying at Stanford, Panicker and a few other fellow graduates were part of a class, Entrepreneurial Design for Extreme Affordability, at the d.school at Stanford University. They were asked to create a low-cost infant incubator that could be used in developing countries. They designed an infant warmer that worked without electricity, was expected to be low-cost and was designed for use even by rural mothers in developing countries. After the class, they co-founded Embrace (non-profit), a 501(c)(3) non-profit, in 2008 to bring their project to life. The non-profit entity, Embrace, donates infant warmers to clinics in need, and the for-profit social enterprise, Embrace Innovations, sells the warmers to other clinics.

Embrace has also been awarded the INDEX: Design to Improve Life award in 2011, and the Fast Company Innovation By Design Awards, 2012.

== Awards and recognition ==
Year	Title
2015	MIT Technology Review TR35 35-Innovators-Under-35 worldwide
2013	The Economist Innovation Award for Social and Economic Innovation
2013	World Economic Forum and Schwab Foundation Social Entrepreneur of the Year
2012	Industrial Designers Society of America International Design Excellence Awards (IDEA) Gold
2012	Tech Award Laureate
2012	CNBC TV18 Young Turk
2008	Echoing Green Fellow
