= Mediterranean climate =

Type of climate

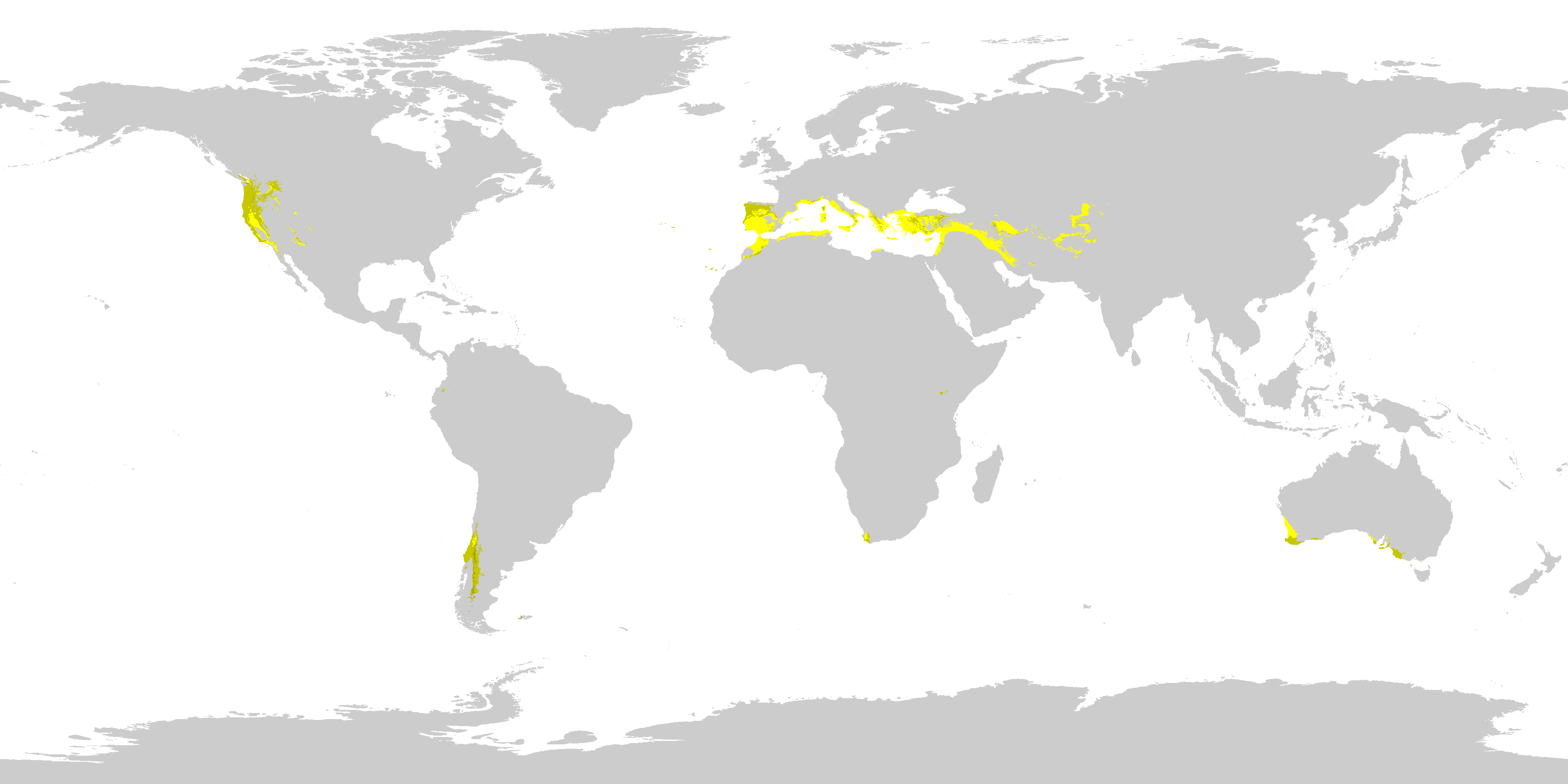
Regions with Mediterranean climates as of 1991-2020, using a threshold of −3 °C (27 °F) for the coldest month Hot-summer Mediterranean climate (Csa) Warm-summer Mediterranean climate (Csb) Cold-summer Mediterranean climate (Csc)

A Mediterranean climate (/ˌmɛdɪtəˈreɪniən/ MED-ih-tə-RAY-nee-ən), also called a dry summer climate, described by Köppen and Trewartha as Cs, is a temperate climate type that occurs in the lower mid-latitudes (normally 30 to 45 north and south latitude). Such climates typically have dry summers and wet winters, with summer conditions being hot and winter conditions typically being mild. These weather conditions are typically experienced in the majority of Mediterranean-climate regions and countries, but remain highly dependent on proximity to the ocean, elevation, and geographical location.

The dry summer climate is found throughout the warmer middle latitudes, affecting almost exclusively the western portions of continents in relative proximity to the coast. The climate type's name is in reference to the coastal regions of the Mediterranean Sea, which mostly share this type of climate, but it can also be found in the Atlantic portions of Iberia and Northwest Africa, the Pacific portions of the United States and Chile, extreme west areas of Argentina, the southwest tip of South Africa, parts of Southwest and South Australia, and parts of Central Asia. They tend to be found in proximity (both poleward and near the coast) of desert and semi-arid climates, and equatorward of oceanic climates.

Mediterranean climate zones are typically located along the western coasts of landmasses, between roughly 30 and 45 degrees north or south of the equator. The main cause of Mediterranean, or dry summer, climate is the subtropical ridge, which extends towards the pole of the hemisphere in question during the summer and migrates towards the equator during the winter. This is due to the seasonal poleward-equatorward variations of temperatures.

The resulting vegetation of Mediterranean climates are the garrigue or maquis in the European Mediterranean Basin, the chaparral in California, the fynbos in South Africa, the mallee in Australia, and the matorral in Chile. Areas with this climate are also where the so-called "Mediterranean trinity" of major agricultural crops have traditionally been successfully grown (wheat, grapes and olives). As a result, these regions are notable for their high-quality wines, grapeseed/olive oils, and bread products.

== Köppen climate classification ==
Continental Portugal has a clear contrast between the cool to warm (Csb) and hot (Csa) summers.

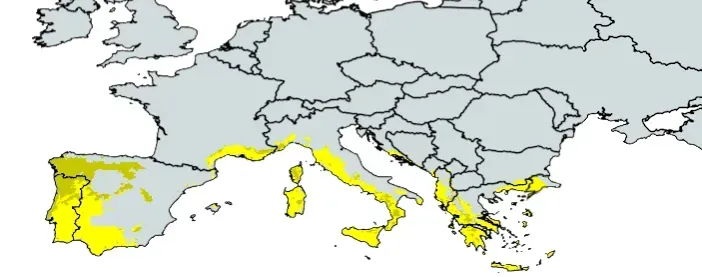
Map of mediterranean climate in europe, showing Csa (Csa) and Csb (Csb) compared.

Under the Köppen climate classification, "hot dry-summer" climates (classified as Csa) and "cool dry-summer" climates (classified as Csb) are often referred to as just "Mediterranean". Under the Köppen climate system, the first letter indicates the climate group (in this case temperate climates). Temperate climates or "C" zones average temperature above 0 °C (32 °F) (or −3 °C (27 °F)), but below 18 °C (64 °F), in their coolest months. The second letter indicates the precipitation pattern ("s" represents dry summers). Köppen has defined a dry summer month as a month with less than 30 mm (1.2 in) of precipitation and as a month within the high-sun months of April to September, in the case of the Northern Hemisphere and October to March, in the case of the Southern Hemisphere, and it also must contain exactly or less than one-third that of the wettest winter month. Some, however, use a 40 mm (1.6 in) level. The third letter indicates the degree of summer heat: "a" represents an average temperature in the warmest month above 22 °C (72 °F), while "b" indicates the average temperature in the warmest month below 22 °C (72 °F). There is a "c" with 3 or less months' average temperature above 10 °C (50 °F), but this climate is rare and is very isolated.

Under the Köppen classification, dry-summer climates (Csa, Csb) usually occur on the western sides of continents. Csb zones in the Köppen system include areas normally not associated with Mediterranean climates but with Oceanic climates, such as much of the Pacific Northwest, much of southern Chile, parts of west-central Argentina, parts of New Zealand, and parts of northwestern Spain (Galicia). Additional highland areas in the subtropics also meet Cs requirements, though they, too, are not normally associated with Mediterranean climates. The same goes for a number of oceanic islands such as Madeira, the Juan Fernández Islands, the western part of the Canary Islands, and the eastern part of the Azores.

Under Trewartha's modified Köppen climate classification, the two major requirements for a Cs climate are revised. Under Trewartha's system, at least eight months must have average temperatures of 10 °C (50 °F) or higher (subtropical), and the average annual precipitation must not exceed 900 mm (35 in), as well as satisfying Köppen's precipitation requirements.

== Precipitation ==
Chile has four months of winter, no more, and in them, except when there is a quarter moon, when it rains one or two days, all the other days have such a beautiful sunshine that it is not necessary to resort to fire. The summer is so temperate, with delicious airs, that man can go all day under the sun.

— Pedro de Valdivia to Charles V, Holy Roman Emperor

Poleward extension and expansion of the subtropical anticyclone over the oceans bring subsiding air to the region in summer, with clear skies and high temperatures. When the anticyclone moves Equator-ward in winter, it is replaced by traveling, frontal cyclones with their attendant precipitation.

During summer, regions of the Mediterranean climate are strongly influenced by the subtropical ridge which keeps atmospheric conditions very dry with minimal cloud coverage. In some areas, such as coastal California, the cold ocean current has a stabilizing effect on the surrounding air, further reducing the chances for rain, but often causing thick layers of marine fog that usually evaporate by mid-day. Similar to desert climates, in many Mediterranean climates there is a strong diurnal character to daily temperatures in the warm summer months due to strong solar heating during the day from sunlight and rapid cooling at night.

In winter, the subtropical ridge migrates towards the equator and leaves the area, making rainfall much more likely. As a result, areas with this climate receive almost all of their precipitation during their winter and spring seasons, and may go anywhere from four to six months during the summer and early fall without having any significant precipitation. In the lower latitudes, precipitation typically decreases during both the winter and summer months. Toward the polar latitudes, total moisture levels generally increase; for example, the Mediterranean climate in Southern Europe tends to experience more rainfall. Rainfall in Southern Europe is also more evenly distributed throughout the year, while in places such as Southern California, the summer is nearly or completely dry. In areas where steppe climates are found, the overall precipitation pattern may still resemble that of Mediterranean climates, though with drier conditions.

Irregularity of the rainfall, which can vary considerably from year to year, accentuates the droughts of the Mediterranean climate. Rain does not fall evenly, nor does the rain arrive at the same time or within the same intervals. In Gibraltar, for instance, rain starts falling nearly half a season earlier than at the Dead Sea. In Israel and Palestine no rain at all falls in summer but early rains may come in autumn.

== Temperature ==
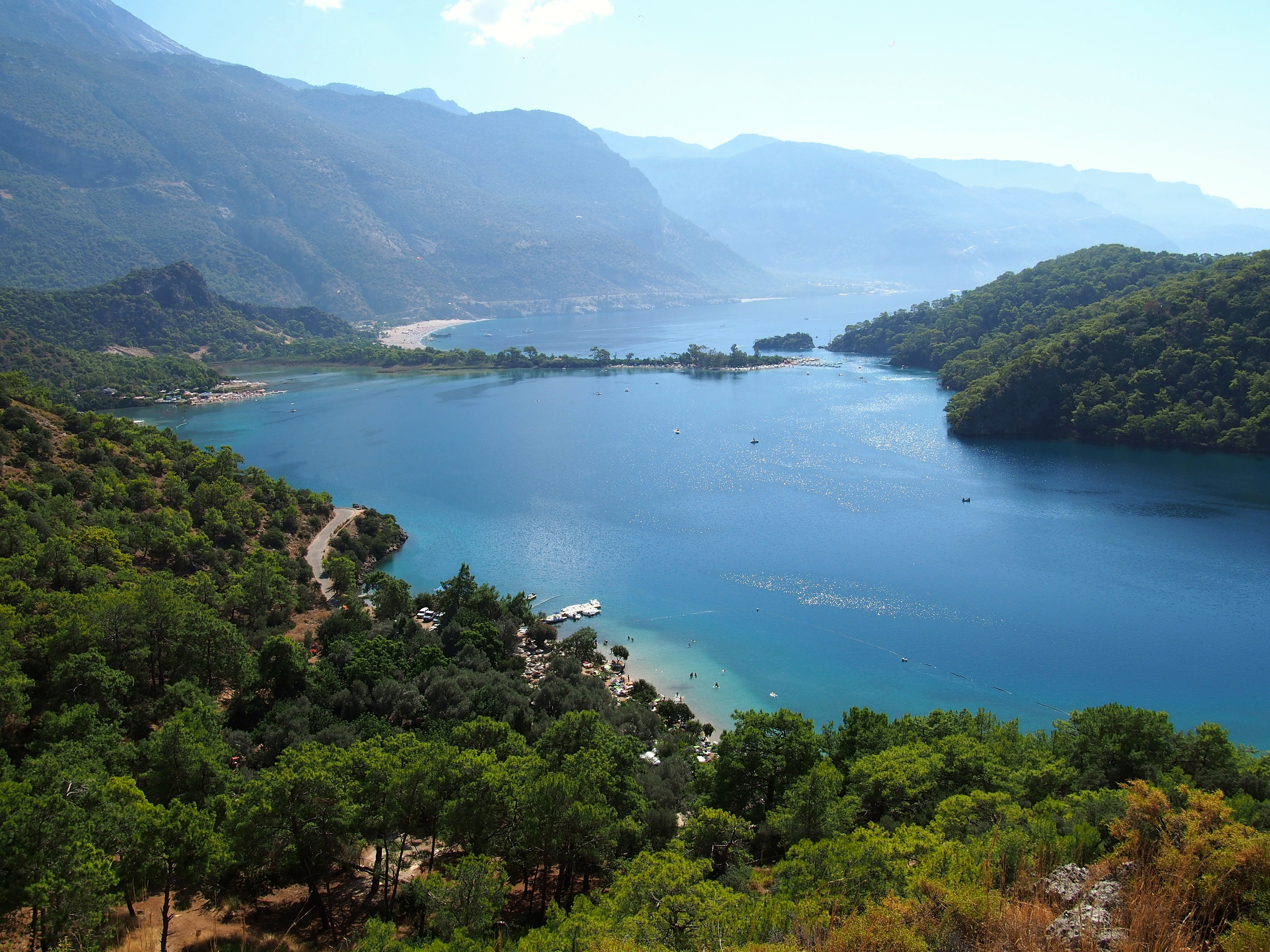
Aegean Sea of Ölüdeniz, Turkey

The majority of the regions with Mediterranean climates have relatively mild winters and very warm summers. However, winter and summer temperatures can vary greatly between different regions with a Mediterranean climate. For instance, in the case of winters, Funchal experiences mild to warm temperatures in the winter, with frost and snowfall almost unknown, whereas Tashkent has cold winters with annual frosts and snowfall; or, to consider summer, Seville experiences rather high temperatures in that season. In contrast, San Francisco has cool summers with daily highs around 21 °C (70 °F) due to the continuous upwelling of cold subsurface waters along the coast.

Because most regions with a Mediterranean climate are near large bodies of water, temperatures are generally moderate, with a comparatively small range of temperatures between the winter low and summer high unlike (the relatively rare) dry-summer humid continental climates (although the daily diurnal range of temperature during the summer is large due to dry and clear conditions, except along the immediate coastlines). Temperatures during winter only occasionally fall below the freezing point and snow is generally seldom seen. Summer temperatures can be cool to very hot, depending on the distance from a large body of water, elevation, and latitude, among other factors. Strong winds from inland desert regions can sometimes boost summer temperatures up, quickly increasing the risk of wildfires. Notable exceptions to the usual proximity from bodies of water, thus featuring extremely high summer temperatures and cooler winters, include south-eastern Turkey and northern Iraq (Urfa, Erbil), surrounded by hot deserts to the south and mountains to the north. Those places routinely experience summer daily means of over 30 °C (86 °F) and daily highs above 40 °C (104 °F), while receiving enough rainfall in winter not to fall into arid or semi-arid classifications.

As in every climatologic domain, the highland locations of the Mediterranean domain can present cooler temperatures in the summer and winter than the lowland areas, temperatures which can sometimes prohibit the growth of typical cold-sensitive Mediterranean plants. Some Spanish authors opt to use the term 'continental Mediterranean climate' (Clima Mediterráneo Continentalizado) for some regions with lower temperatures in winter than the coastal areas, but Köppen's Cs zones show no distinction as long as winter temperature means stay above freezing.

Additionally, the temperature and rainfall pattern for a Csa or even a Csb climate can exist as a microclimate in some high-elevation locations adjacent to a rare tropical As (tropical savanna climate with dry summers, typically in a rainshadow region, as in Hawaii). These have a favourable climate, with mild wet winters and fairly warm, dry summers.

== Mediterranean biome ==
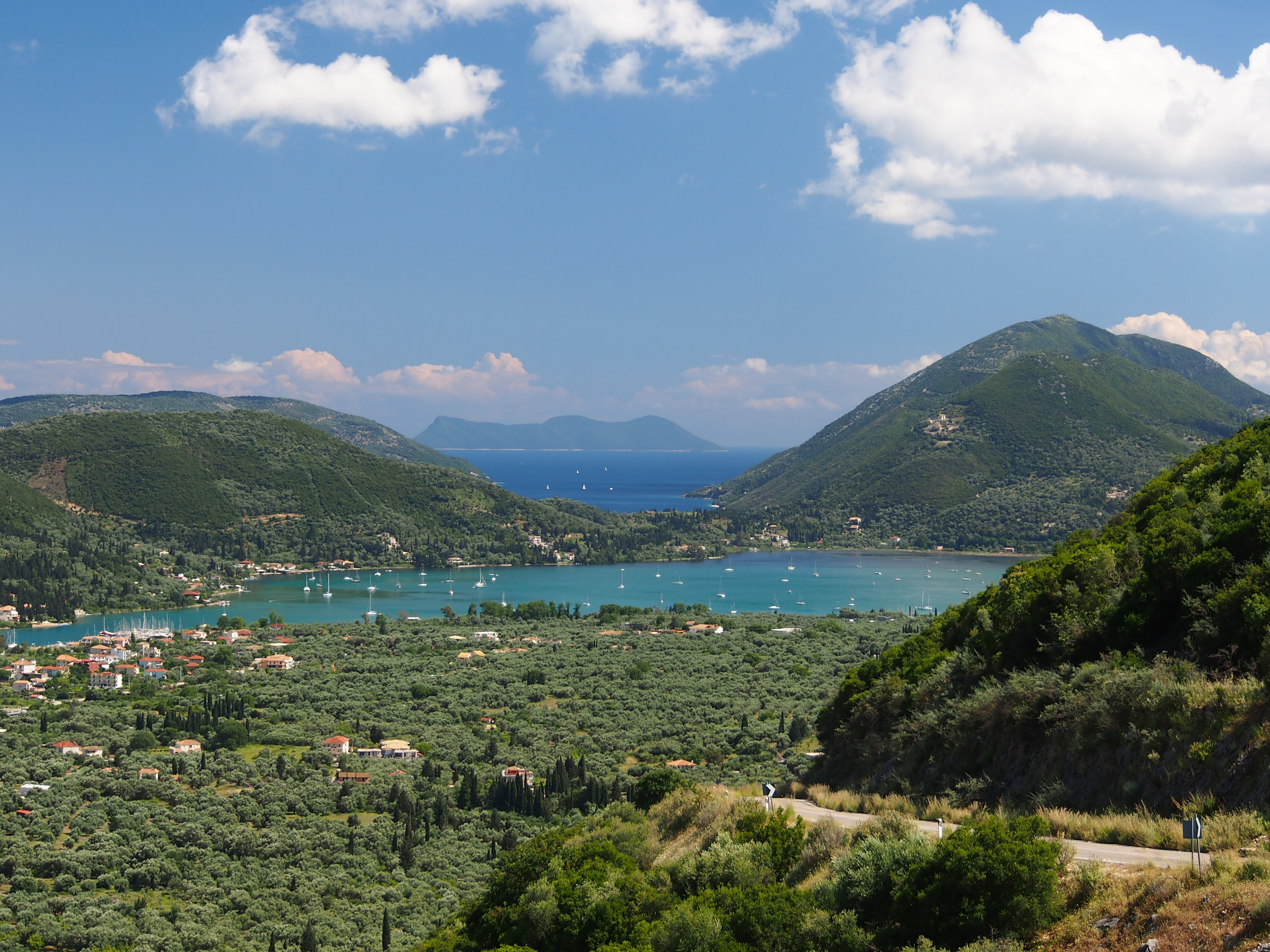
The Ionian Sea, view from the island Lefkada, Greece

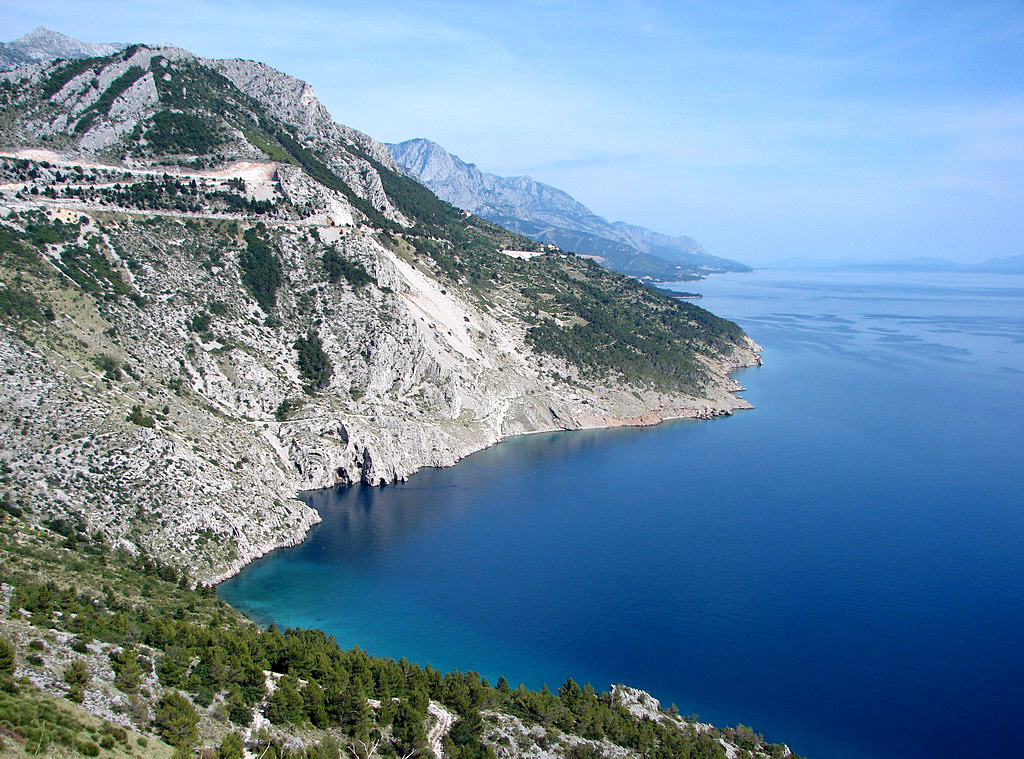
Makarska Riviera in Dalmatia, Croatia

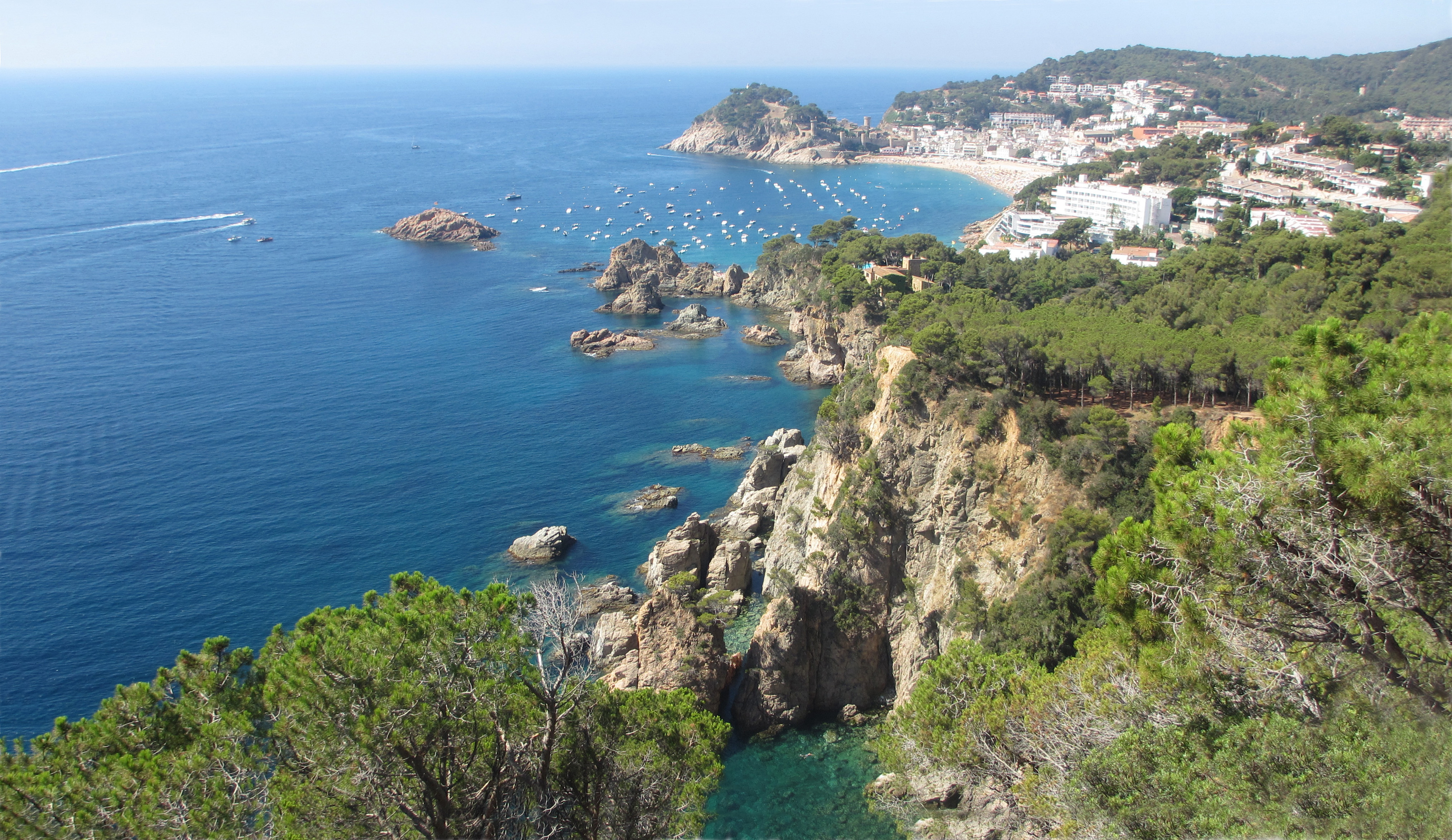
The coastal Mediterranean region of Costa Brava, Catalonia, Spain

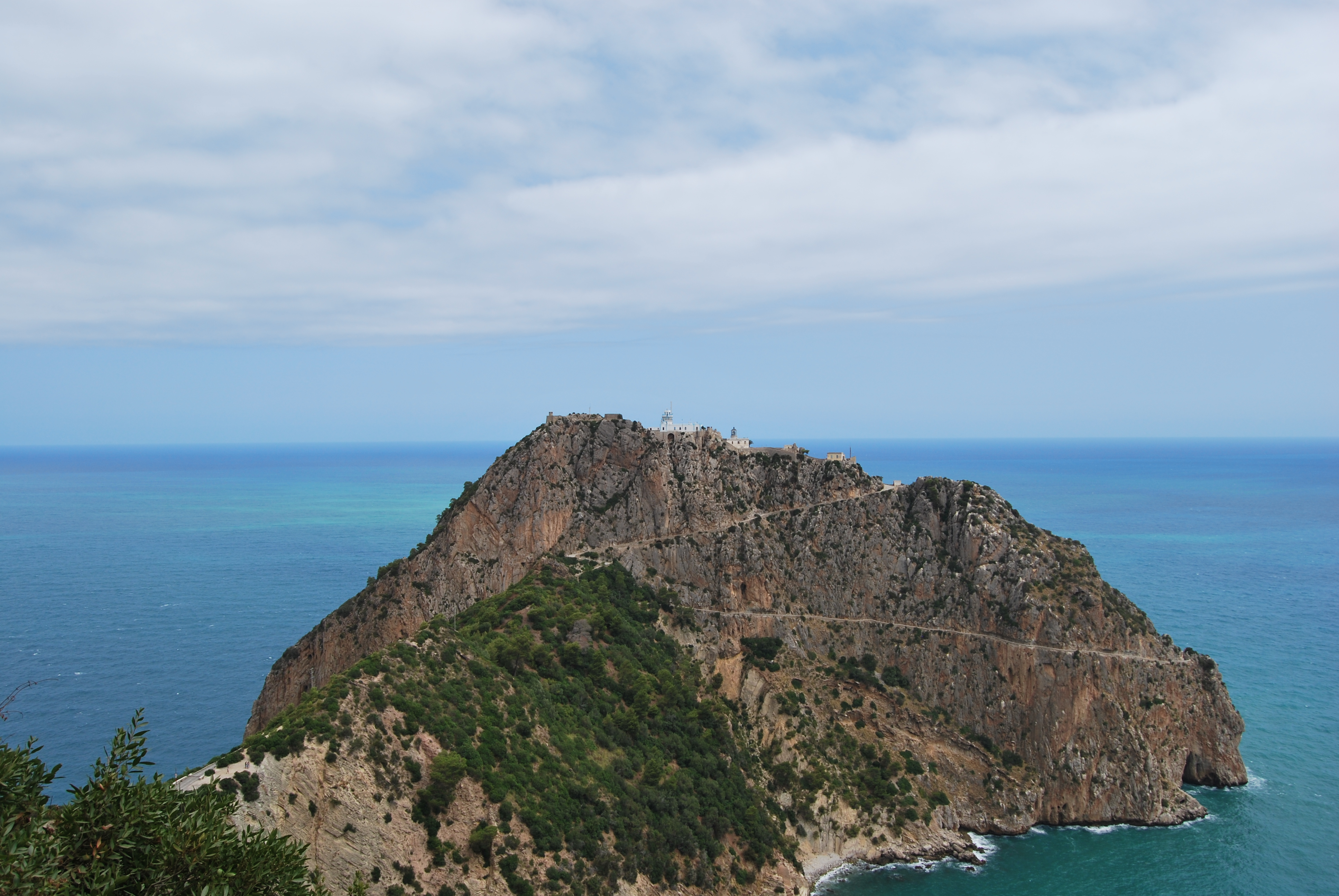
The coastal Mediterranean region of north-eastern Algeria, Béjaïa (Cap-Carbon)

The Mediterranean forests, woodlands, and scrub biome is closely associated with Mediterranean climate zones, as are unique freshwater communities, though vegetation native to the Mediterranean climate zone can also be found in the approximate nearby climate zones, which usually tend to be the humid subtropical, oceanic and/or semi-arid zones, depending on the region and location. Particularly distinctive of the climate are sclerophyll shrublands, called maquis in the Mediterranean Basin, chaparral in California, matorral in Chile, fynbos in South Africa, and mallee and kwongan shrublands in Australia.

Mediterranean vegetation shows a number of adaptations to drought, grazing, and frequent fire regimes. The small sclerophyllous leaves that characterize many of the perennial shrubs of this biome, help conserve water and prevent nutrient loss. The soils generally are of low fertility, and many plants have mutualistic relationships with nitrogen-fixing bacteria.

Aquatic communities in Mediterranean climate regions are adapted to a yearly cycle in which abiotic (environmental) controls of stream populations and community structure dominate during floods, biotic components (e.g. competition and predation) controls become increasingly important as the flood discharge declines, and environmental controls regain dominance as environmental conditions become very harsh (i.e. hot and dry); as a result, these communities are well suited to recover from droughts, floods, and fires. Aquatic organisms in these regions show distinct long-term patterns in their structure and function, and are also highly sensitive to the recent effects of climate change.

=== Natural vegetation ===
The native vegetation of Mediterranean climate lands must be adapted to survive long, hot summer droughts in summer and prolonged wet periods in winter. Mediterranean vegetation examples include the following:

- Evergreen trees: casuarina, melaleuca, pine, and cypress
- Deciduous trees: sycamore and some types of oak
- Fruit bearing plants: olive, figs, walnuts and grapes
- Shrubs: rosemary, Erica, Banksia, buckeyes, chamise, bay laurel and some oaks.
- Sub-shrubs: lavender, Halimium, grevillea and sagebrush
- Grasses: grassland types, Themeda triandra, bunchgrasses; sedges, and rushes
- Herbs: Achillea, Dietes, Helichrysum and Penstemon

Many native vegetations in Mediterranean climate area valleys have been cleared for agriculture and farming. In places such as the Sacramento Valley and Oxnard Plain in California, draining marshes and estuaries combined with supplemental irrigation has led to a century of intensive agriculture. Much of the Overberg in the southern Cape of South Africa, was once covered with renosterveld, but has likewise been largely converted to agriculture, mainly for wheat. In hillside and mountainous areas, away from the urban sprawls, ecosystems and habitats of native vegetation are more sustained and undisturbed.

The fynbos vegetation in the South-western Cape in South Africa is famed for its high floral diversity, and includes such plant types as members of the Restionaceae, Ericas (Heaths) and Proteas. Representatives of the Proteaceae also grow in Australia, such as Banksias. The palette of California native plants is also renowned for its species and cultivar diversity.

== Hot-summer Mediterranean climate ==
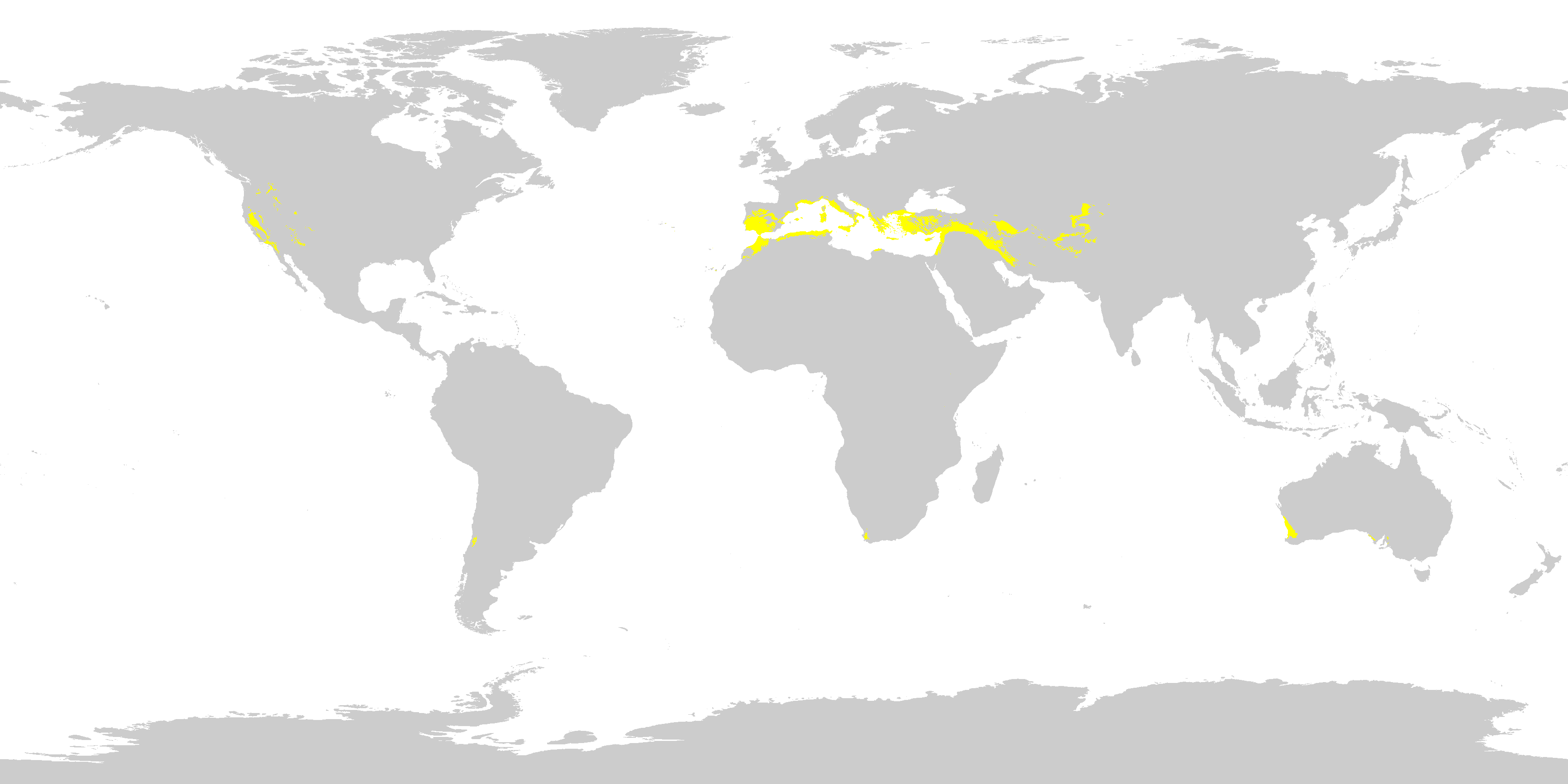
Hot-summer mediterranean climate (Csa) as of 1991-2020, using a threshold of −3 °C (27 °F) for the coldest month

This subtype of the Mediterranean climate (Csa) is the most common form of the Mediterranean climate, therefore it is also known as a "typical Mediterranean climate". As stated earlier, regions with this form of a Mediterranean climate experience average monthly temperatures in excess of 22.0 °C (71.6 °F) during its warmest month and an average in the coldest month between 18 and −3 °C (64 and 27 °F) or, in some applications, between 18 and 0 °C (64 and 32 °F). Regions with this form of the Mediterranean climate typically experience hot, sometimes very hot and dry summers. Winters can be mild, cool or chilly, and some cities in this region receive somewhat regular snowfall (e.g. Kermanshah), while others do not receive any (e.g. Casablanca).

Csa climates are mainly found around the Mediterranean Sea, southern Australia, southwestern South Africa, sections of Central Asia, northern sections of Iran and Iraq, the California Central Valley and Southern California, and Central Chile. Southern California's coasts also experience hot summers due to the shielding effect of the Channel Islands. However, unshielded areas of that coastline can have warm-summer Mediterranean climates with hot-summer areas just a few kilometres inland.

Rome, Italy

Climate chart (precipitation, max. and min. temperature)
J	F	M	A	M	J	J	A	S	O	N	D
66 12 3	63 13 3	59 16 6	69 19 9	57 22 13	30 28 17	20 31 19	30 32 20	65 27 16	88 22 12	108 17 9	98 13 5
- █ Average max. and min. temperatures in °C
- █ Precipitation totals in mm
- Source: NOAA
Imperial conversion
J	F	M	A	M	J	J	A	S	O	N	D
2.6 54 38	2.5 55 38	2.3 60 43	2.7 66 47	2.2 72 55	1.2 83 62	0.8 88 67	1.2 89 68	2.6 80 61	3.5 72 54	4.3 62 47	3.9 55 40
- █ Average max. and min. temperatures in °F
- █ Precipitation totals in inches

Marseille, France

Climate chart (precipitation, max. and min. temperature)
J	F	M	A	M	J	J	A	S	O	N	D
47 12 4	30 13 4	30 16 7	52 19 9	38 24 13	28 28 17	11 31 20	26 31 19	82 26 16	73 21 13	76 16 8	41 12 4
- █ Average max. and min. temperatures in °C
- █ Precipitation totals in mm
- Source: Metéo France
Imperial conversion
J	F	M	A	M	J	J	A	S	O	N	D
1.9 53 38	1.2 55 39	1.2 62 44	2 67 49	1.5 74 56	1.1 82 63	0.4 87 67	1 87 67	3.2 79 61	2.9 70 55	3 60 46	1.6 54 40
- █ Average max. and min. temperatures in °F
- █ Precipitation totals in inches

Lisbon, Portugal

Climate chart (precipitation, max. and min. temperature)
J	F	M	A	M	J	J	A	S	O	N	D
100 15 8	85 16 9	53 19 11	68 20 12	54 22 14	16 26 17	4.2 28 18	6.2 28 19	33 27 18	101 23 15	128 18 12	127 15 9
- █ Average max. and min. temperatures in °C
- █ Precipitation totals in mm
- Source: Instituto de Meteorologia
Imperial conversion
J	F	M	A	M	J	J	A	S	O	N	D
3.9 59 47	3.3 61 48	2.1 66 52	2.7 68 53	2.1 72 57	0.6 78 62	0.2 82 65	0.2 83 65	1.3 80 64	4 73 59	5 65 53	5 60 49
- █ Average max. and min. temperatures in °F
- █ Precipitation totals in inches

Perth, Australia

Climate chart (precipitation, max. and min. temperature)
J	F	M	A	M	J	J	A	S	O	N	D
9.5 31 18	13 31 18	19 30 16	44 26 14	118 22 11	177 19 9	170 18 8	134 19 8	81 20 10	52 23 11	22 26 14	13 29 16
- █ Average max. and min. temperatures in °C
- █ Precipitation totals in mm
- Source: BoM
Imperial conversion
J	F	M	A	M	J	J	A	S	O	N	D
0.4 87 64	0.5 88 64	0.8 85 62	1.7 78 56	4.6 72 51	7 67 47	6.7 65 46	5.3 66 46	3.2 68 49	2.1 73 52	0.9 79 57	0.5 84 61
- █ Average max. and min. temperatures in °F
- █ Precipitation totals in inches

== Warm-summer Mediterranean climate ==
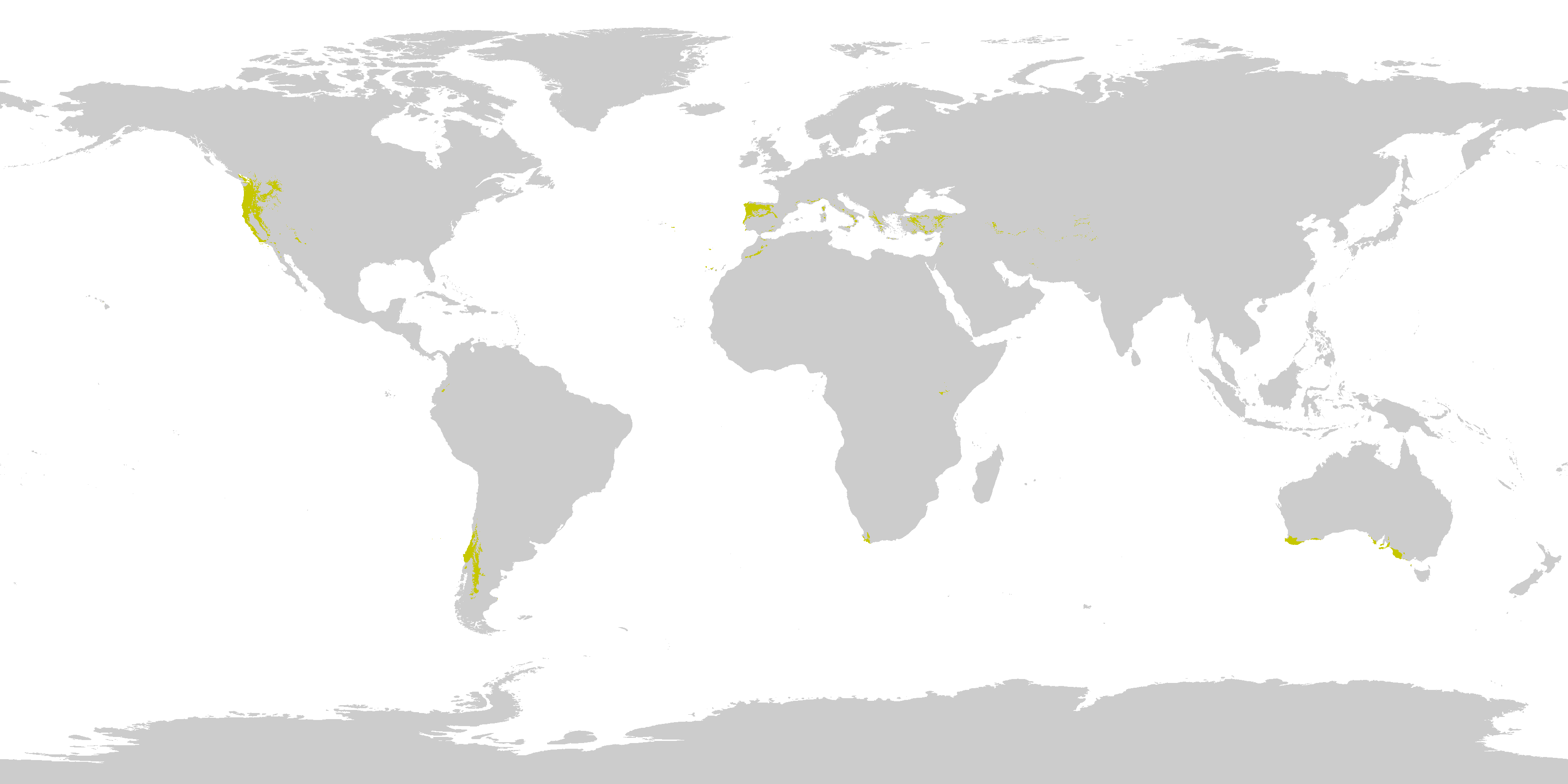
Warm-summer mediterranean climate (Csb) as of 1991-2020, using a threshold of −3 °C (27 °F) for the coldest month

Occasionally also termed the "cool-summer Mediterranean climate", this subtype of the Mediterranean climate (Csb) is less common and involves warm (but not hot) and dry summers, with no average monthly temperatures above 22 °C (72 °F) during its warmest month and as usual an average in the coldest month between 18 and −3 °C (64 and 27 °F) or, in some applications, between 18 and 0 °C (64 and 32 °F).

Also, at least four months must average above 10 °C (50 °F).

Cool ocean currents, upwelling and higher latitudes are often the reason for this cooler type of Mediterranean climate.

The other main reason for this cooler type is the elevation. For instance, Menton on the French coast has a Csa climate while Castellar, Alpes-Maritimes, the adjacent town just north of Menton, with an elevation between 100 and 1,382 m (328 and 4,534 ft), has a Csb climate instead. The village of Siah Bisheh in Northern Iran also has a Csb climate because of its location inside the Alborz mountains.

Winters in this zone are rainy and can be mild to chilly. Some locales in this zone experience some amount of snowfall, while others do not.

Csb climates are found in parts of northwestern Iberian Peninsula, such as in provinces of Ourense, Pontevedra and Lugo (located in Galician autonomous community of Spain), as well as in the Norte region and west coast of Portugal). This type of climate also occurs in coastal Northern California, in the Pacific Northwest (namely western Washington, western Oregon and southern portions of Vancouver Island in British Columbia), in central Chile, in parts of southern Australia and in sections of southwestern South Africa. Rarer instances of this climate can be found in relatively small and isolated high elevation areas of the Andes in Northern Ecuador, Peru, Colombia, and western Venezuela.

Porto, Portugal

Climate chart (precipitation, max. and min. temperature)
J	F	M	A	M	J	J	A	S	O	N	D
158 14 5	140 15 6	90 17 8	116 18 9	98 20 12	46 24 15	18 25 16	27 26 16	71 24 15	138 21 12	158 17 9	195 14 7
- █ Average max. and min. temperatures in °C
- █ Precipitation totals in mm
- Source: Instituto de Meteorologia
Imperial conversion
J	F	M	A	M	J	J	A	S	O	N	D
6.2 57 41	5.5 59 43	3.5 63 46	4.6 65 48	3.8 68 53	1.8 74 58	0.7 78 61	1.1 78 61	2.8 75 58	5.4 69 54	6.2 63 48	7.7 58 44
- █ Average max. and min. temperatures in °F
- █ Precipitation totals in inches

Victoria, Canada

Climate chart (precipitation, max. and min. temperature)
J	F	M	A	M	J	J	A	S	O	N	D
94 7 3	72 9 4	47 11 5	29 13 6	26 16 8	21 18 10	14 20 11	20 20 12	27 19 11	51 14 8	99 9 5	109 7 3
- █ Average max. and min. temperatures in °C
- █ Precipitation totals in mm
- Source: Environment Canada
Imperial conversion
J	F	M	A	M	J	J	A	S	O	N	D
3.7 45 37	2.8 47 39	1.8 51 40	1.1 56 43	1 61 47	0.8 64 50	0.6 68 52	0.8 68 53	1.1 65 51	2 57 46	3.9 49 41	4.3 45 38
- █ Average max. and min. temperatures in °F
- █ Precipitation totals in inches

Cape Town, South Africa

Climate chart (precipitation, max. and min. temperature)
J	F	M	A	M	J	J	A	S	O	N	D
15 26 16	17 27 16	20 25 14	41 23 12	69 20 9	93 18 8	82 18 7	77 18 8	40 19 9	30 21 11	14 24 13	17 25 15
- █ Average max. and min. temperatures in °C
- █ Precipitation totals in mm
- Source: WMO
Imperial conversion
J	F	M	A	M	J	J	A	S	O	N	D
0.6 79 60	0.7 80 60	0.8 78 58	1.6 73 53	2.7 69 49	3.7 65 46	3.2 64 45	3 64 46	1.6 67 48	1.2 70 51	0.6 74 56	0.7 77 59
- █ Average max. and min. temperatures in °F
- █ Precipitation totals in inches

== Cold-summer Mediterranean climate ==
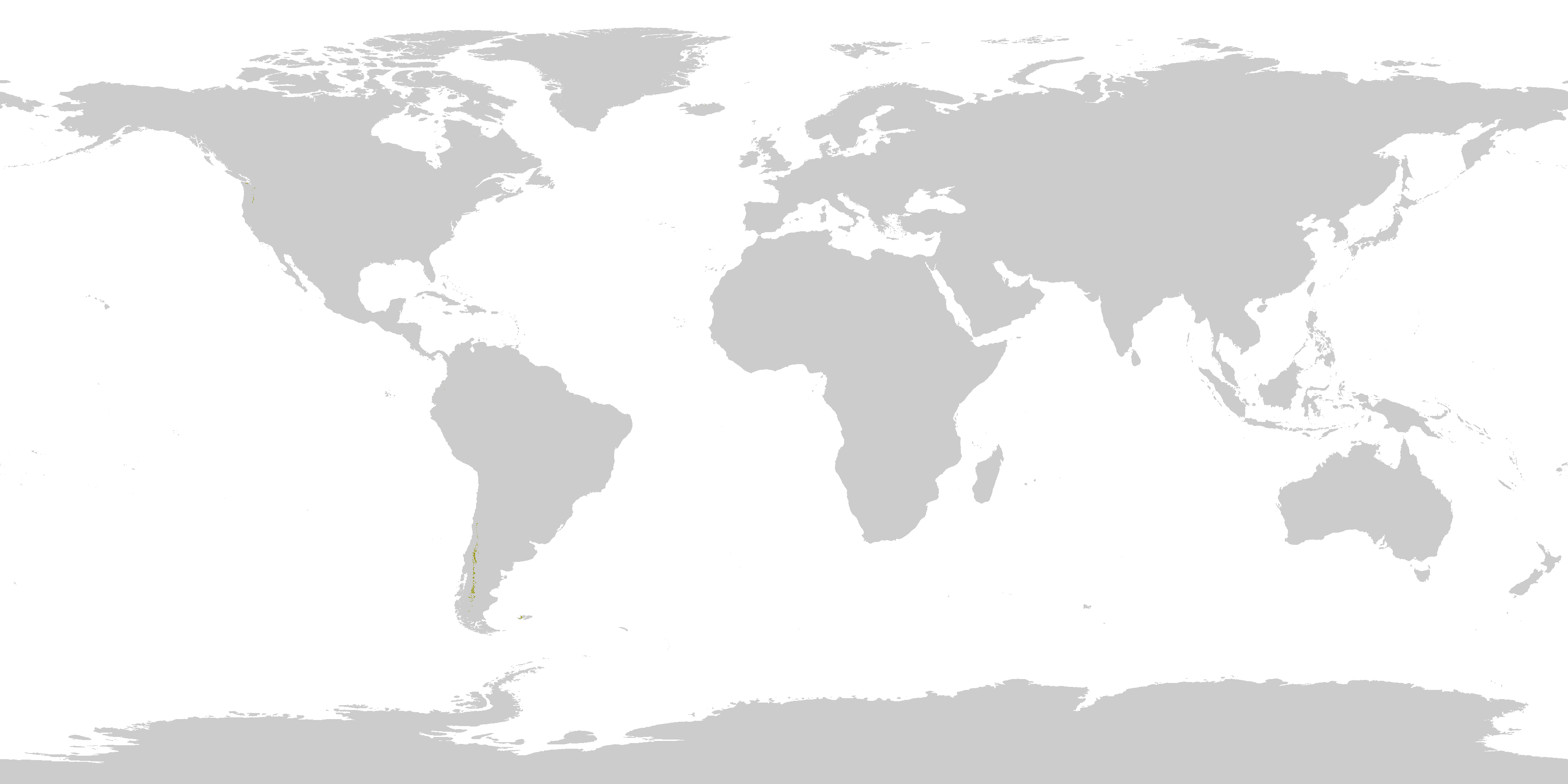
Cold-summer mediterranean climate (Csc) as of 1991-2020, using a threshold of −3 °C (27 °F) for the coldest month

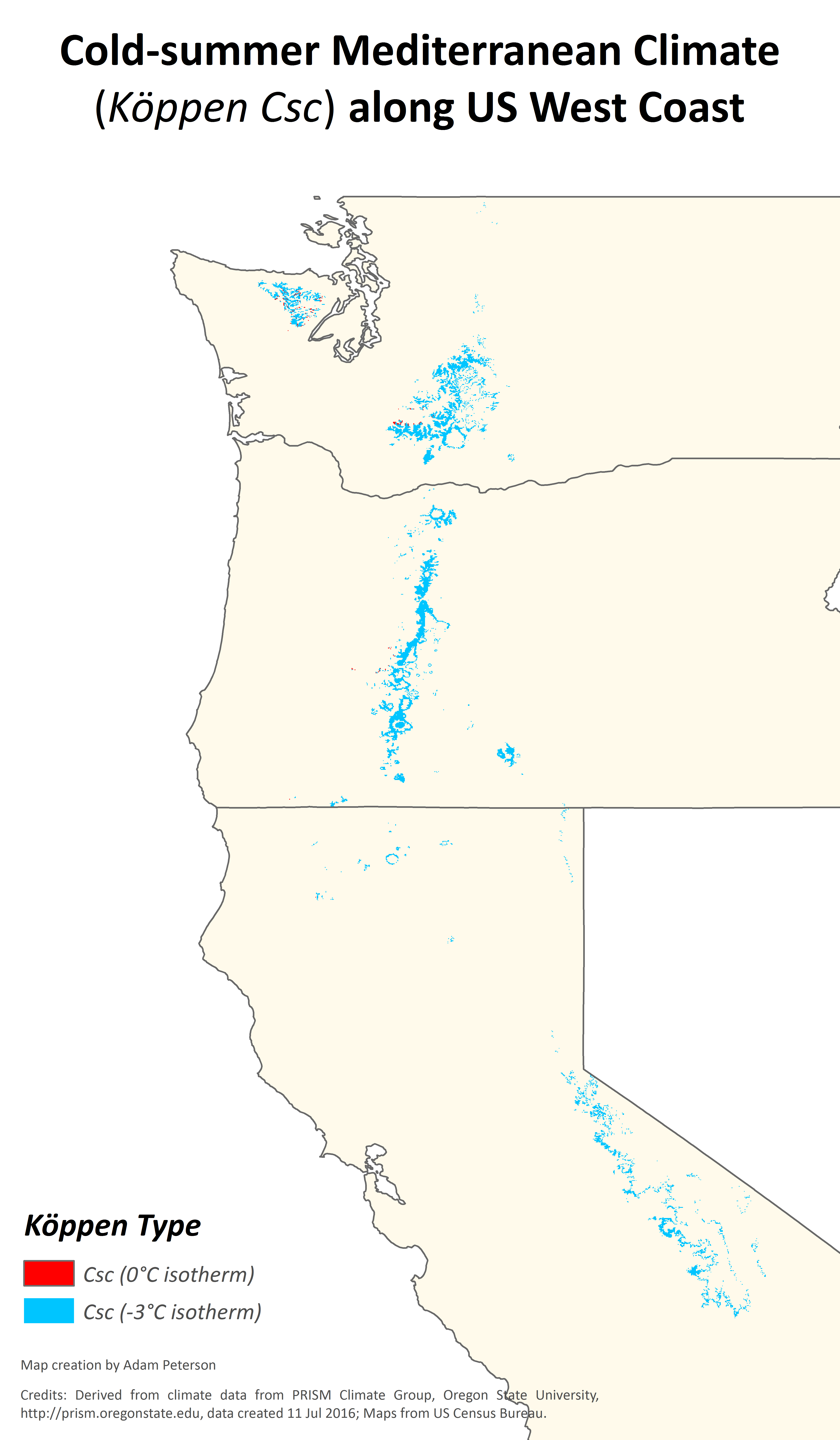
Distribution of the relatively rare cold-summer Mediterranean climate (Köppen type Csc) in Washington, Oregon and California

The cold-summer subtype of the Mediterranean climate (Csc) is rare and predominantly found at scattered high-elevation locations along the west coasts of North and South America having a similar climate. This type is characterized by cool, dry summers, with less than four months with a mean temperature at or above 10 °C (50 °F), as well as with cool, wet winters, with no winter month having a mean temperature below 0 °C (32 °F) (or −3 °C [27 °F], depending on the isotherm used). Regions in the Americas with this climate are influenced by the dry-summer trend (though briefly) that extends considerably poleward along the west coast, as well as the moderating influences of high and relative proximity to the Pacific Ocean. These conditions maintain an unusually narrow temperature range throughout the year for climate zones at such distances from coasts.

In North America, areas with Csc climate can be found in the Olympic, Cascade, Klamath, and Sierra Nevada ranges in Washington, Oregon and California. These locations are found at high elevation nearby lower elevation regions characterized by a warm-summer Mediterranean climate (Csb) or hot-summer Mediterranean climate (Csa). A rare instance of this climate occurs in the tropics, on Haleakalā Summit in Hawaii.

In South America, Csc regions can be found along the Andes in Chile and Argentina. The town of Balmaceda, Chile is one of the few towns confirmed to have this climate.

Small areas with a Csc climate can be found at high elevations in Corsica.

In Norway, the small fishing village of Røstlandet, in Røst Municipality, above the Arctic Circle has a climate bordering on Csc and is known as a "climatic anomaly" due to abnormally warm temperatures despite its latitude located above 67°N latitude.

Balmaceda, Chile

Climate chart (precipitation, max. and min. temperature)
J	F	M	A	M	J	J	A	S	O	N	D
28 18 7	20 18 6	38 16 5	54 12 3	93 8 1	85 4 −2	84 4 −3	72 6 −1	49 9 0	30 13 2	28 15 4	32 16 6
- █ Average max. and min. temperatures in °C
- █ Precipitation totals in mm
- Source: DMC infochile
Imperial conversion
J	F	M	A	M	J	J	A	S	O	N	D
1.1 64 44	0.8 64 43	1.5 60 40	2.1 53 37	3.6 46 33	3.4 40 28	3.3 38 27	2.8 43 30	1.9 49 32	1.2 55 36	1.1 58 40	1.2 62 42
- █ Average max. and min. temperatures in °F
- █ Precipitation totals in inches

Haleakala Summit, United States

Climate chart (precipitation, max. and min. temperature)
J	F	M	A	M	J	J	A	S	O	N	D
203 7 1	91 10 2	78 11 3	102 11 3	34 13 4	9.4 15 6	12 14 5	28 15 6	40 14 6	34 14 5	104 10 3	119 6 0
- █ Average max. and min. temperatures in °C
- █ Precipitation totals in mm
- Source: The Western Regional Climate Center
Imperial conversion
J	F	M	A	M	J	J	A	S	O	N	D
8 45 34	3.6 50 36	3.1 51 37	4 52 37	1.4 55 39	0.4 58 42	0.5 58 42	1.1 58 42	1.6 58 42	1.3 57 41	4.1 51 38	4.7 43 32
- █ Average max. and min. temperatures in °F
- █ Precipitation totals in inches

Liawenee, Australia

Climate chart (precipitation, max. and min. temperature)
J	F	M	A	M	J	J	A	S	O	N	D
49 19 5	37 18 5	65 16 4	66 12 2	89 9 0	104 7 −1	120 6 −2	129 7 −1	111 9 −1	69 12 1	64 15 3	59 17 4
- █ Average max. and min. temperatures in °C
- █ Precipitation totals in mm
- Source: Bureau of Meteorology
Imperial conversion
J	F	M	A	M	J	J	A	S	O	N	D
1.9 66 42	1.5 65 41	2.5 61 39	2.6 54 35	3.5 48 32	4.1 44 30	4.7 42 29	5.1 44 30	4.4 48 31	2.7 54 33	2.5 59 37	2.3 62 39
- █ Average max. and min. temperatures in °F
- █ Precipitation totals in inches
