= Davidson Current =

Countercurrent of the Pacific Ocean

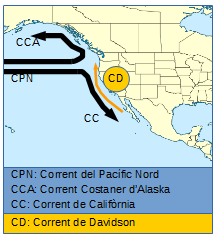
Currents of the West coast, with the Davidson Current in yellow

In oceanography, the Davidson Current is a coastal countercurrent of the Pacific Ocean running north along the western coast of the United States from Baja California, Mexico to northern Oregon, ending at about latitude 48°N, Its flow is adjacent to the California Current, but it flows north rather than south and hugs the coastline. The current is active year-round at 650 feet (200 meters) below sea level, but surfaces during the winter months, generally from mid-November through mid-February. In these months, northerly winds weaken and are replaced to some extent by southwesterly winds.

The Davidson Current was discovered by the American geodesist, astronomer, geographer, surveyor and engineer George Davidson, who was associated with the early California Academy of Sciences (CAS) in San Francisco, California.

== See also ==
- North Pacific Gyre
