= Ecosystem of the North Pacific Subtropical Gyre =

Major circulating ecosystem of ocean currents

The North Pacific Subtropical Gyre (NPSG) is the largest contiguous ecosystem on earth. In oceanography, a subtropical gyre is a ring-like system of ocean currents rotating clockwise in the Northern Hemisphere and counterclockwise in the Southern Hemisphere caused by the Coriolis Effect. They generally form in large open ocean areas that lie between land masses.

The NPSG is the largest of the gyres as well as the largest ecosystem on our planet. Like other subtropical gyres, it has a high-pressure zone in its center. Circulation around the center is clockwise around this high-pressure zone. Subtropical gyres make up 40% of the Earth’s surface and play critical roles in carbon fixation and nutrient cycling. This particular gyre covers most of the Pacific Ocean and comprises four prevailing ocean currents: the North Pacific Current to the north, the California Current to the east, the North Equatorial Current to the south, and the Kuroshio Current to the west. Its large size and distance from shore has caused the NPSG to be poorly sampled.

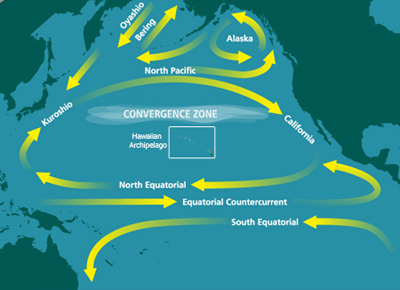
The main ocean currents involved with the North Pacific Gyre

The life processes in open-ocean ecosystems are a sink for the atmosphere’s increasing CO_{2}. Gyres make up a large proportion, approximately 75%, of what we refer to as the open ocean, or the area of the ocean that does not consist of coastal areas. They are considered oligotrophic, or nutrient poor because they are far from terrestrial runoff. These regions were once thought to be homogenous and static habitats. However, there is increasing evidence that the NPSG exhibits substantial physical, chemical, and biological variability on a variety of time scales. Specifically, the NPSG exhibits seasonal and interannual variations in primary productivity (simply defined as the production of new plant material), which is important for the uptake of CO_{2}.

The NPSG is not only a sink for CO_{2} in the atmosphere, but also other pollutants. As a direct result of this circular pattern, gyres act like giant whirlpools and become traps for anthropogenic pollutants, such as marine debris. The NPSG has become recognized for the large quantity of plastic debris floating just below the surface in the center of the gyre. This area has recently received a lot of media attention and is commonly referred to as the Great Pacific Garbage Patch.

== History of discovery ==
The NPSG is not often sampled because of its distance from the coast and its shortage of marine life. These vast and deep ocean waters, far from the influence of land, have historically been considered the oceanic equivalent of terrestrial deserts, with low standing stocks of biomass and low production rates. This perspective is derived from a dearth of comprehensive investigation of central gyre habitats. Over the past two decades these views have been challenged with a newfound understanding of the dynamics of the NPSG.

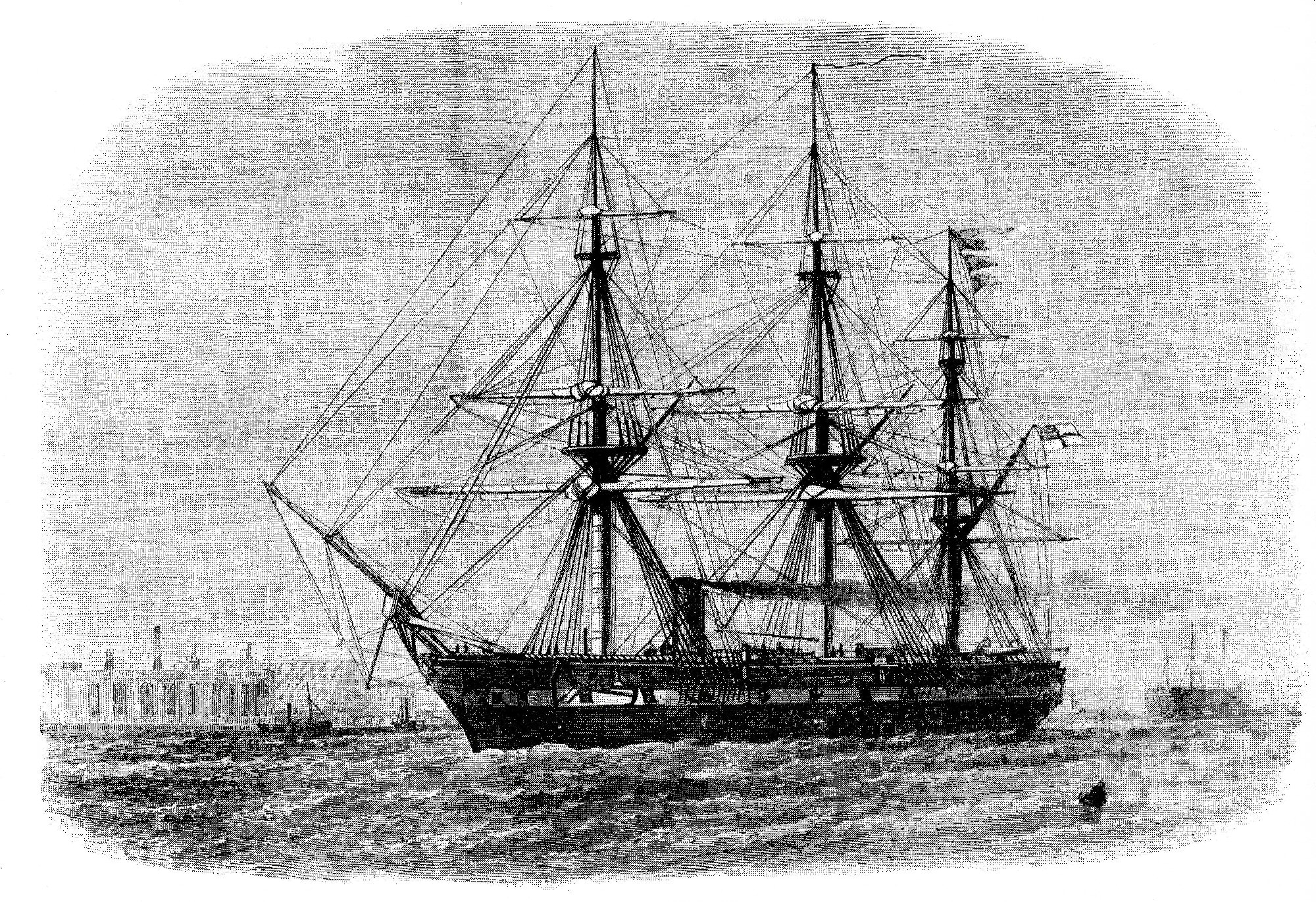
HMS Challenger embarked upon the first global marine research expedition in the 19th century.

During the early days of marine exploration, HMS Challenger (1872–1876), on its leg from Yokohama to Honolulu, collected plant and animal specimens as well as numerous seawater samples. The goals of this expedition were to determine the chemical composition of seawater and the organic matter in suspension and to study the distribution and abundance of various communities of organisms. The motivation for studying open ocean ecosystems has changed over time, whereas today more modern studies focus on biodiversity and the effects of climate on ecosystem dynamics. Today, the Hawaii Ocean Time-series (HOT) program has assembled the largest and most comprehensive ecological data set for the NPSG and is scheduled to continue to the next millennium. Programs like HOT have debunked the hypothesis that this ecosystem is static and homogenous, finding that the NPSG exhibits dynamic seasonal patterns separating it from other open ocean systems.

== Physical characteristics ==
The NPSG is the largest of the open ocean habitats and is considered to be the Earth’s largest contiguous biome. This great anticyclonic circulation feature extends from 15°N to 35°N latitude and from 135°E to 135°W longitude. Its surface area spans approximately 2 × 10^{7} km^{2}. Its western portion, west of 180° longitude, has greater physical variability than the eastern portion. This variability, where different weather patterns affect subregions differently, is due to the large dimensions of this gyre.

This large variability is caused by discrete eddies, near-inertial motions, and internal tides. Climate patterns such as the North Pacific Gyre Oscillation (NPGO), El Nino/Southern Oscillation (ENSO) and the Pacific Decadal Oscillation (PDO) affect the interannual variability in primary productivity in the NPSG. DiLorenzo et al., 2008 These conditions can have profound effects on biological processes within this habitat, they have the ability to shift sea surface temperature (SST), chlorophyll patterns, nutrient patterns, oxygen concentrations, mixed layer depths, and thus the carrying capacity (amount of life this habitat can carry) of the NPSG.

== Nutrient cycling ==
Low nutrient concentrations and thus a low density of living organisms characterize the surface waters of the NPSG. The low biomass results in clear water, allowing photosynthesis to occur to a substantial depth. The NPSG is classically described as a two-layered system. The upper, nutrient-limited layer accounts for most of the primary production, supported primarily by recycled nutrients. The lower layer has nutrients more readily available, but photosynthesis is light-limited.

In open-ocean systems, biological production depends on intense nutrient recycling within the euphotic (sunlit) zone, with only a small fraction supported by the input of “new” nutrients. Previously there was a perception that the NPSG was a marine desert and that “new” nutrients were not commonly added to this system. The outlook has changed, as scientists have begun to have a better understanding of this habitat. Although fairly high rates of primary production are maintained through rapid recycling of nutrients, physical processes such as internal waves and tides, cyclonic mesoscale eddies, wind-driven Ekman pumping, and atmospheric storms may carry in new nutrients.

Nutrients that do not get used up on the surface will eventually sink down and nourish the seafloor habitat. The deep benthic habitats of the ocean gyres have been thought to typically consist of some of the most food-poor regions on the planet. One of the sources of nutrients to this deep ocean habitat is marine snow. Marine snow consists of detritus, dead organic matter, which falls from the surface waters where productivity is highest and exports carbon and nitrogen from the surface mixed layer to the deep ocean. Data on the abundance of marine snow to the deep ocean floor is lacking in this large ecosystem. However, Pilskaln et al. found that in the NPSG, marine snow was at a higher abundance than expected and was surprisingly comparable to a deep coastal upwelling system.

Higher nutrient value may be because of Rhizosolenia mats, which also play an important role in contributing to marine snow in subtropical gyres. These are generally multi-species associations of Rhizosolenia species of diatoms. This larger phytoplankton may reach up to tens of centimeters in size. These mats are particularly abundant in the NPSG. Their abundance in this ecosystem suggests a higher flux of nutrients in the NPSG than was predicted in classic theories.

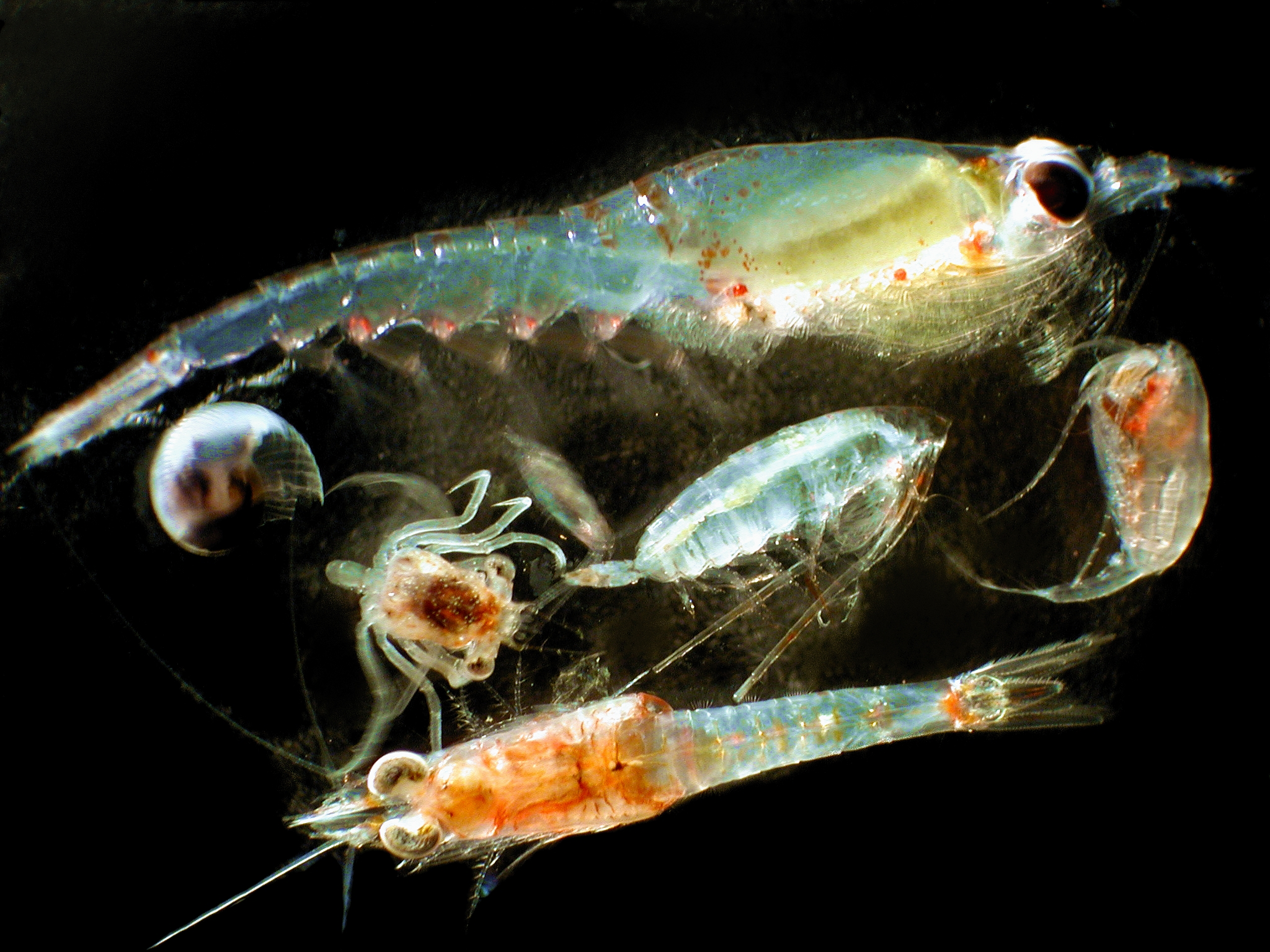
Zooplankton can migrate nutrients across different vertical levels of ocean.

While N is transported deeper by this mechanism, the surface waters are potentially cut off from this source. Nitrogen must be available for life at the surface. In order to account for this lack of nitrogen to the surface, there are organisms that are capable of nitrogen fixation in the NPSG. Trichodesmium is one species capable of nitrogen fixation that is found in many surface plankton blooms. Nitrogen fixation is the process where inert N_{2} is taken from the atmosphere and converted into a nitrogen compound that is available to organisms for use. In many oligotrophic marine ecosystems, nitrogen fixation is a common source of nitrogen.

Vertically migrating zooplankton can also actively transport nutrients to different zones of the water column. Zooplankton feed in the surface waters at night, and then by day release fecal pellets to the midwaters, which can transport C, N, and P to the deeper waters. In the NPSG the zooplankton community is not static but fluctuates seasonally and is dominated by copepods, euphausiids, and chaetognaths.

Recently, classic theories about the lack of nutrients in the NPSG have been disproven and new theories suggest that the ecosystem actually is dynamic and characterized by strong seasonal, interannual, and even decadal variability It has also been deemed highly sensitive to climate change, scientists have observed increases in water column stratification and decreased inorganic nutrient availability. These changes are proposed as driving mechanisms that are changing the current trend in phytoplankton community structure from eukaryotic to prokaryotic populations, as these simpler organisms can withstand lower nutrient supply. Zooplankton and phytoplankton represent less than 10% of living organisms in this region, and it is now well documented that the NPSG is a “microbial ecosystem”.

== Microbial community ==
Microbial organisms make up the majority of the primary producers in the NPSG. They are autotrophic, meaning they capture their own “food” from sunlight and chemicals, including CO_{2}. These organisms comprise the base of the food chain, and thus their presence in an ecosystem is fundamental. In the NPSG, primary productivity is often described as low.

Before 1978, scientists hypothesized that diatoms dominated plankton populations in the NPSG. The primary consumers were expected to be relatively large mesozooplankton. It is now well known that most of the algae in the NPSG are actually bacteria (unicellular organisms), dominated by cyanobacteria, or blue-green algae. These simple organisms make up the majority of the standing stock of photosynthesizing marine life in this ecosystem. Scientists have also recently discovered Archaea (also a single-celled microorganism, but more similar to a eukaryote than bacteria) genes in the NPSG, suggesting that additional diversity exists in this habitat. Many microorganisms may exist in this gyre because small body size has a competitive advantage in the ocean for resource (light and nutrients) acquisition. In the contemporary view of the NPSG, the microbial food web is always present, whereas the larger eukaryote-grazer food chain is seasonal and ephemeral.

== Eukaryotic plankton community ==
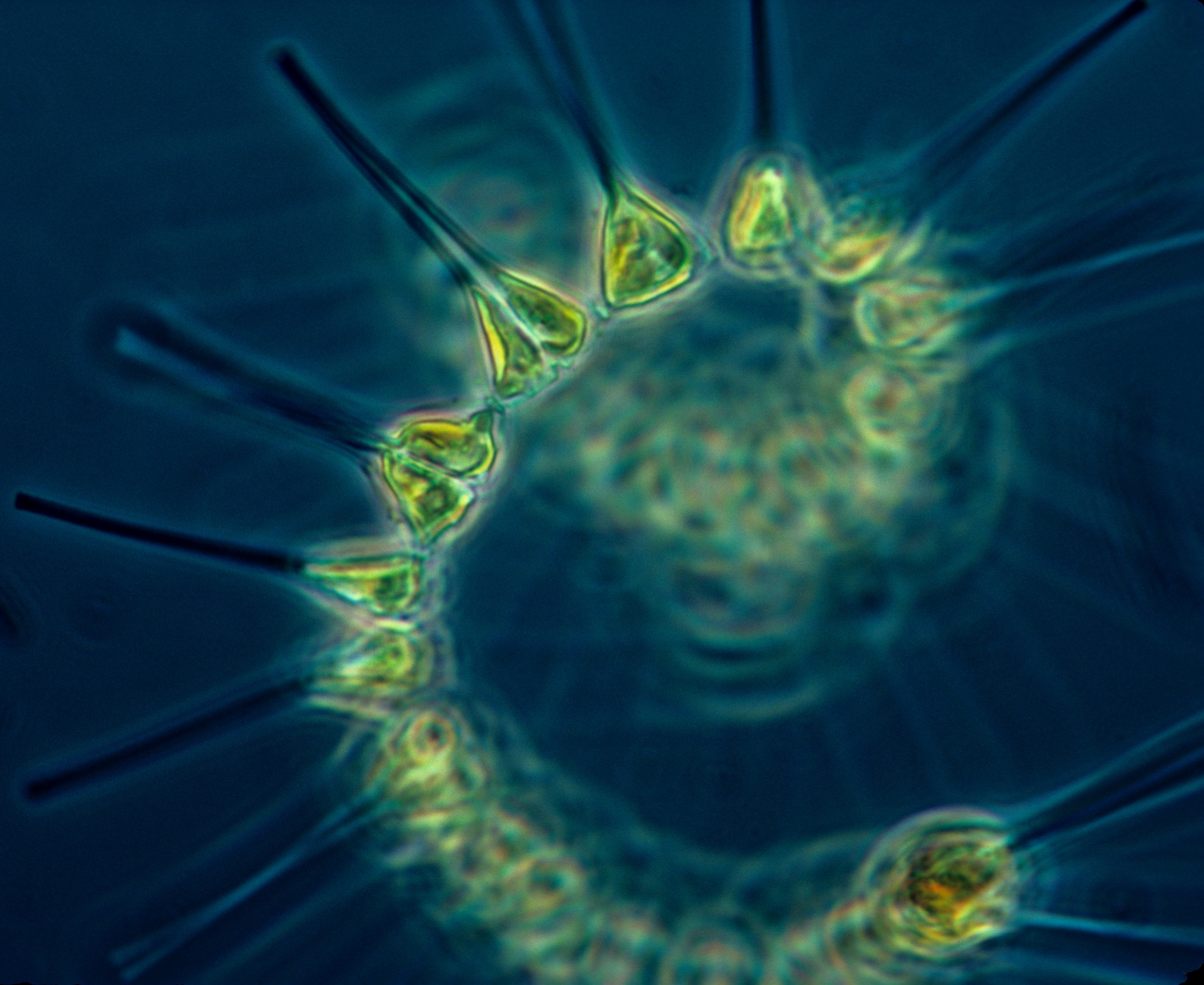
Phytoplankton are a form of Eukaryotic plankton found in oceans.

Eukaryotic plankton in the gyre is dependent on “new” nutrients coming in from physical weather patterns. The classic two-layered model discussed in previous sections considers the upper layer to be equivalent to a “spinning wheel,” with little export of nutrients because they are constantly recycled. This model does not allow for the input of new nutrients, which is problematic because this would make any rapid increase, or bloom of phytoplankton impossible. Despite ever-present nutrient limitation in the upper portion, plankton biomass and rates of primary production have considerable temporal variability and do produce blooms in the NPSG.

This interannual variability has been attributed to alterations in upper ocean nutrient supply stemming from physical variations due to ENSO and PDO. Based on new data, it now appears that present rates of primary production in these low nutrient regions are much greater than had been considered, and can vary significantly on time scales ranging from daily to interdecadal. In the spring, rapid increases in surface phytoplankton are occasionally observed in association with cyclonic mesoscale eddies or intense atmospheric disturbances, both physical processes that bring in new nutrients. In the summer, blooms are seen more regularly and are typically dominated by diatoms and cyanobacteria. These regular summer blooms may be caused by variations in the PDO. Summer blooms have been observed in these waters as long as research vessels have been frequenting them. All of these blooms have been seen in the eastern part of the NSPG with none reported west of 160° W. Hypotheses to explain this phenomenon are that the gyre is characterized by low phosphate, but that the bloom region of the eastern NPSG has considerably higher phosphate concentrations than the western.

Variations in primary production in the NPSG can significantly affect nutrient cycling, food-web dynamics, and global elemental fluxes. The size distribution of pelagic primary producers determines both the composition and magnitude of the exported nutrients to the deeper waters. This in turn affects the communities that live in the deeper waters of this system.

== Mesopelagic community ==
The mesopelagic zone is sometimes referred to as the twilight zone; it extends from 200m to around 1000m. In the deeper layers of the NPSG, species higher up on the food chain will migrate vertically or horizontally within or in and out of the gyre. Based on analyses of the zooplankton community, the Central North Pacific has a high species diversity (or high number of species) and high equitability (meaning relatively equal numbers of each exist). There is also a low degree of seasonal variability of densities of zooplankton.

Studies of mesopelagic fishes of central subtropical waters are scarce. The few studies that do exist found that mesopelagic fish species are not uniformly distributed throughout the subtropical Pacific Ocean. Their geographic ranges conform to patterns shown by zooplankton. Some of the species found are restricted to these low-productivity central gyres. Some of the families of fish that are highly represented are Mytophids, Gonostomatids, Photichthyids, Sternoptychids, and Melamphaids. Our understanding of the mesopelagic community of the NPSG suffers from an insufficiency of data due to the difficulty of accessing the deeper zones of this system.

== Benthic community ==
The deepest community in the NPSG is the benthic community. At the depths of the gyre lies a sea floor of fine-grained clay sediments. This sediment is home to a community of organisms, which generally receive their nutrients as a “rain” of productivity sinking from above. At depth under the gyre lies one of the most food-poor areas on the planet, which therefore supports very low densities and biomass of benthic infauna, or animals residing in the sediment. In the sediment itself, nutrients generally decline with depth, including carbon, chlorophyll, and nitrogen. Density of the benthic infauna is consistent with this nutrient pattern. Infauna are typically found in the shallower layers of sediments where the sediment-water interface lies and generally decrease in number with increasing depth in the sediment. Bacteria in the sediment show this pattern as well as macrofauna (infaunal organisms >0.5mm), which are dominated by agglutinating (soft-bodied) foraminifera and nematodes. Other prominent macrofauna found in the sediment are calcareous foraminifera, copepods, polychaetes, and bivalves. These benthic organisms rely heavily on the supply of nutrients that settle to the sea floor. Any change in primary production at the surface could pose a major threat to these organisms, as well as cause other potential negative outcomes to other parts of the NPSG.

== Future and importance of the NPSG ==
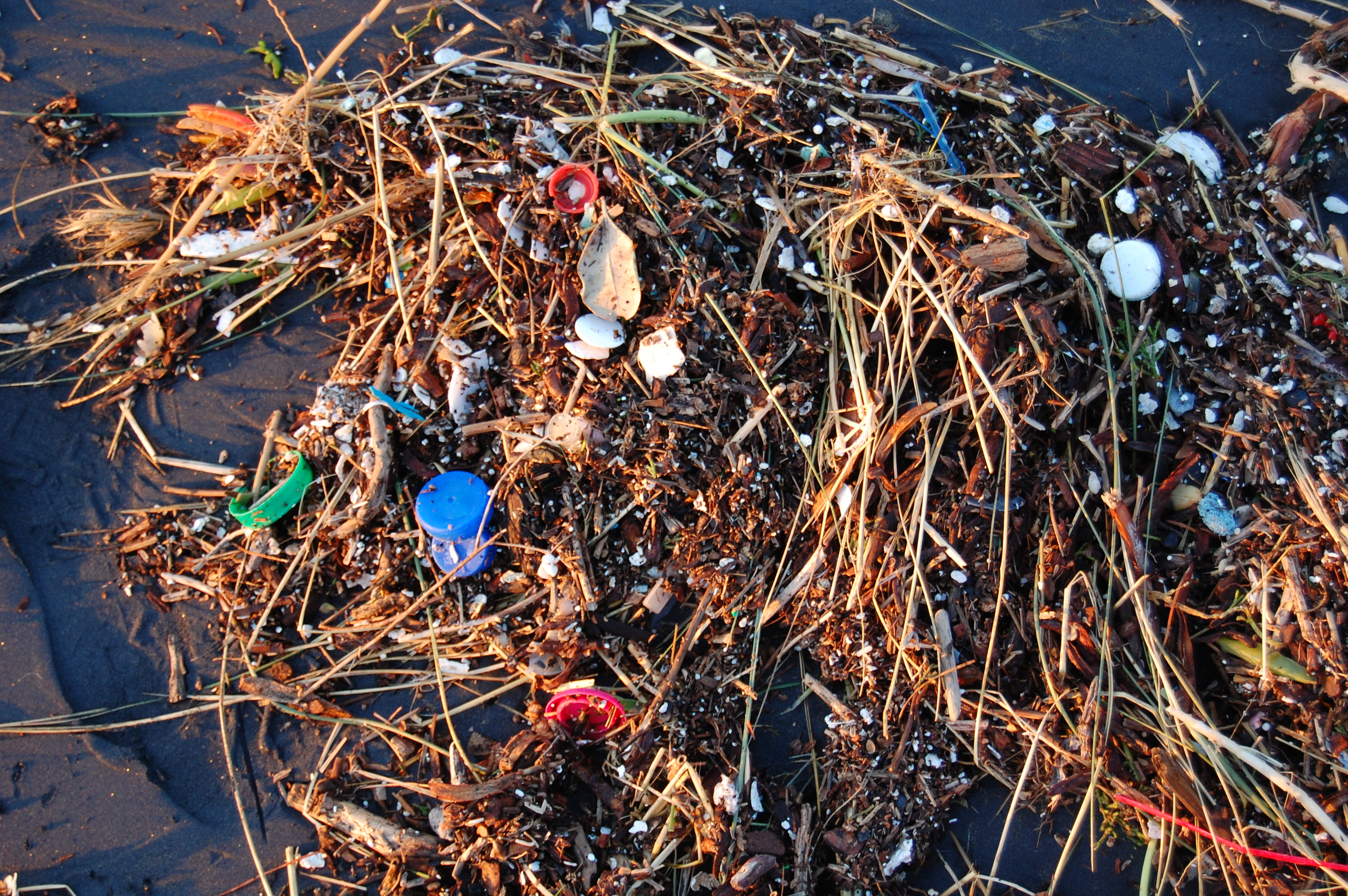
Plastic garbage washed ashore from the Pacific Ocean

Until recently the NPSG was considered to be a static part of a vast global marine desert. Recent discoveries have proved that this system is dynamic and contains physical, chemical, and biological variability on a variety of time scales. With the current changing climate, patterns in the atmosphere are shifting and causing changes in primary production in the NPSG. Variations in primary productivity can affect the ocean carbon cycle and potentially atmospheric CO_{2} and climate, because such variations can change the amount of carbon that is stored in the subsurface layers of the oceans. Because the NPSG is the largest contiguous biome on earth, it is not only important to a community of organisms, but also the rest of the planet.

The eddy effects of the gyre serve to retain pollutants in its center. If a pollutant gets trapped in a current that is headed toward a gyre, it will stay there indefinitely or as long as the life of the pollutant. A common pollutant in the NPSG is plastic debris. The NPSG forces debris into its central area.

This phenomenon has recently given this gyre the nickname, “The Pacific Garbage Patch.” The mean abundance and weight of plastic pieces in this area are currently the largest observed in the Pacific Ocean.

== See also ==
- Plastisphere

== Sources ==
- Barnett, M. A. (1984). "Mesopelagic fish zoogeography in the central tropical and subtropical Pacific Ocean: Species composition and structure at representative locations in three ecosystems". Marine Biology. 82 (2): 199–208. Bibcode:1984MarBi..82..199B. doi:10.1007/BF00394103. S2CID 86221172.
- Brix, H., Gruber, N., Karl, D., and N. Bates. 2006. "On the relationships between primary, net community, and export production in subtropical gyres". Deep-Sea Research Part II. (53) 698–717.
- Corno, G., Karl, D., Church, M., Letelier, R., Lukas, R., Bidigare, R., and M. Abbott. 2007. "Impact of climate forcing on ecosystem processes in the North Pacific Subtropical Gyre". Journal of Geophysical Research. (112) 1–14.
- DiLorenzo E., Schneider, N., Cobb, K., Franks, P., Chhak, K., Miller, A., McWilliams, J., Bograd, S., Arango, H., Curchitser, E., Powell, T., and P. Riviere. 2008. North "Pacific Gyre Oscillations links ocean climate and ecosystem change". Geophysical Research Letters. (35) 1–6.
- Dore, J. E.; Letelier, R. M.; Church, M. J.; Lukas, R.; Karl, D. M. (2008). "Summer phytoplankton blooms in the oligotrophic North Pacific Subtropical Gyre: Historical perspective and recent observations". Progress in Oceanography. 76 (1): 2–38. Bibcode:2008PrOce..76....2D. doi:10.1016/j.pocean.2007.10.002.
- Dunning, Brian (16 December 2008). "Skeptoid #132: The Sargasso Sea and the Pacific Garbage Patch". Skeptoid.
- Hannides, C. C. S.; Landry, M. R.; Benitez-Nelson, C. R.; Styles, R. E. M.; Montoya, J. P.; Karl, D. M. (2009). "Export stoichiometry and migrant-mediated flux of phosphorus in the North Pacific Subtropical Gyre". Deep-Sea Research Part I: Oceanographic Research Papers. 56 (1): 73–88. Bibcode:2009DSRI...56...73H. doi:10.1016/j.dsr.2008.08.003.
- Karl, D. M. (1999). "Minireviews: A Sea of Change: Biogeochemical Variability in the North Pacific Subtropical Gyre" (PDF). Ecosystems. 2 (3): 181–214. Bibcode:1999Ecosy...2..181K. doi:10.1007/s100219900068. JSTOR 3658829. S2CID 46309501.
- Karl, D. M.; Lukas, R. (1996). "The Hawaii Ocean Time-series (HOT) program: Background, rationale and field implementation". Deep-Sea Research Part II: Topical Studies in Oceanography. 43 (2–3): 129. Bibcode:1996DSRII..43..129K. doi:10.1016/0967-0645(96)00005-7.
- Karl, D. M.; Bidigare, R. R.; Letelier, R. M. (2002). "Sustained and Aperiodic Variability in Organic Matter Production and Phototrophic Microbial Community Structure in the North Pacific Subtropical Gyre". Phytoplankton Productivity. p. 222. doi:10.1002/9780470995204.ch9. ISBN 978-0470995204.
- Moore, C., Moore, S., Leecaster, M., and S. Weisberg. 2001. "A comparison of plastic and plankton in the North Pacific central gyre". Marine Pollution Bulletin. (42) page numbers.
- Nicholson, David; Emerson, Steven; Eriksen, Charles C. (2008). "Net community production in the deep euphotic zone of the subtropical North Pacific gyre from glider surveys" (PDF). Limnology and Oceanography. 53 (5 Part 2): 2226–2236. Bibcode:2008LimOc..53.2226N. doi:10.4319/lo.2008.53.5_part_2.2226.
- Pilskaln, C. H.; Villareal, T. A.; Dennett, M.; Darkangelo-Wood, C.; Meadows, G. (2005). "High concentrations of marine snow and diatom algal mats in the North Pacific Subtropical Gyre: Implications for carbon and nitrogen cycles in the oligotrophic ocean". Deep-Sea Research Part I: Oceanographic Research Papers. 52 (12): 2315. Bibcode:2005DSRI...52.2315P. doi:10.1016/j.dsr.2005.08.004. hdl:1912/404.
- Poretsky, R. S.; Hewson, I.; Sun, S.; Allen, A. E.; Zehr, J. P.; Moran, M. A. (2009). "Comparative day/night metatranscriptomic analysis of microbial communities in the North Pacific subtropical gyre". Environmental Microbiology. 11 (6): 1358–1375. Bibcode:2009EnvMi..11.1358P. doi:10.1111/j.1462-2920.2008.01863.x. PMID 19207571.
- Shulenberger, E.; Hessler, R. R. (1974). "Scavenging abyssal benthic amphipods trapped under oligotrophic central North Pacific Gyre waters". Marine Biology. 28 (3): 185. Bibcode:1974MarBi..28..185S. doi:10.1007/BF00387296. S2CID 84095171.
- Smith, K. L.; Baldwin, R. J.; Karl, D. M.; Boetius, A. (2002). "Benthic community responses to pulses in pelagic food supply: North Pacific Subtropical Gyre". Deep-Sea Research Part I: Oceanographic Research Papers. 49 (6): 971. Bibcode:2002DSRI...49..971S. doi:10.1016/S0967-0637(02)00006-7.
