= NPSG =

NPSG or NpSG may refer to:

- Neue-psychoaktive-Stoffe-Gesetz (NpSG), a German drug law governing research chemicals
- North Pacific Subtropical Gyre, a system of circulating ocean currents in the North Pacific Ocean
