= STCC =

STCC may refer to:

- Sandiacre Town Cricket Club
- Scandinavian Touring Car Championship, a touring car series
- Springfield Technical Community College, a community college in Springfield, Massachusetts, United States
- Subtropical Countercurrent, an eastward jet in the central North Pacific
- Swedish Touring Car Championship, a former touring car racing series
  - STCC – The Game, a video game
- Swiss Tech Convention Center, a conference centre
- STCC TCR Scandinavia Touring Car Championship, a touring car series based in Scandinavia
- St Clare's College, Canberra, an all girls school in Canberra, Australia
