= Andrew Bakun =

American oceanographer (1939–2025)

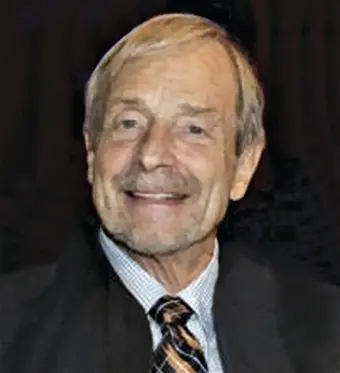
- Andrew Bakun, Oceanographer and Marine Scientist (1939–2025)
- Born: April 20, 1939
- Died: December 4, 2025 (aged 86)
- Occupations: Oceanographer and Conservation Scientist
- Awards: Great Medal of Prince Albert I of Monaco

Academic background
- Education: University of Washington Oregon State University

Academic work
- Discipline: Oceanography, Marine biology, Fisheries science and Marine conservation
- Notable ideas: Bakun Upwelling Index — a quantitative metric widely used in global fisheries research and management to assess coastal upwelling intensity, a key driver of some of the world’s most productive marine ecosystems.

Andrew Bakun (April 20, 1939 – December 4, 2025) was an American oceanographer and conservation scientist whose research significantly advanced scientific understanding of coastal upwelling systems, fisheries dynamics, and the relationship between oceanographic processes and marine ecosystem productivity. He is best known for developing the Bakun upwelling index, a quantitative measure of wind-driven coastal upwelling that has become a foundational tool in global fisheries science and marine ecosystem management.

Bakun held research and academic positions with the National Oceanic and Atmospheric Administration (NOAA), the Food and Agriculture Organization of the United Nations (FAO), and the Rosenstiel School of Marine, Atmospheric, and Earth Science at the University of Miami, and participated in major international oceanographic initiatives, including the International Indian Ocean Expedition.

Bakun died on December 4, 2025, at the age of 86.

== Career ==
=== Research institutions and academic posts ===
Bakun began his professional career as a research scientist with the National Oceanic and Atmospheric Administration (NOAA), where he conducted foundational work on large-scale oceanographic processes influencing fisheries productivity.

He later served as a scientific advisor and researcher with the Food and Agriculture Organization of the United Nations (FAO) contributing to international fisheries assessments and marine resource management efforts.

Bakun participated in the International Indian Ocean Expedition, one of the most significant multinational oceanographic research programs of the twentieth century, aimed at advancing global understanding of monsoon-driven ocean systems and tropical marine productivity.

He held a professorship at the Rosenstiel School of Marine, Atmospheric, and Earth Science, University of Miami, where he conducted research and mentored graduate students in oceanography and marine ecosystem dynamics. Bakun served as a Professor of Marine Biology and Fisheries at the Pew Institute for Ocean Science while it operated at the University of Miami from 2003 to 2008.

== Scientific contributions ==
=== Bakun Upwelling Index ===
Bakun developed the Bakun Upwelling Index as a standardized, quantitative measure of wind-driven coastal upwelling intensity derived from atmospheric pressure fields and geostrophic wind calculations.

The index has become a cornerstone of modern upwelling research and is widely used to study the California Current System, Humboldt Current, Benguela Current, Canary Current, and other eastern boundary upwelling systems. It is frequently cited in fisheries stock assessments, ecosystem modeling, and climate-change impact studies.

=== Upwelling ecosystems and fisheries dynamics ===
Beyond the index itself, Bakun’s research advanced understanding of how physical oceanographic processes regulate marine productivity, trophic interactions, and fish population dynamics. His work helped establish conceptual links between wind forcing, nutrient enrichment, plankton production, and fisheries yield in coastal ecosystems. His 1990 Science paper hypothesized that global warming could intensify coastal upwelling-favorable winds, with profound ecological consequences.

Bakun’s 1990 hypothesis on the relationship between greenhouse warming and coastal upwelling has been recognized in later scientific analyses of climate impacts on marine ecosystems. In a 2015 Nature commentary, it was noted that “in 1990…Andrew Bakun…proposed that…land will heat up faster than the ocean…which would drive stronger upwelling-favourable winds.”

=== Climate impacts on marine systems ===
Bakun was among the early researchers to explore how climate variability and long-term climate change could alter upwelling intensity, ecosystem structure, and fisheries sustainability. His research informed both scientific debate and policy discussions regarding climate-driven changes in marine ecosystems.

=== Ecosystem management and policy influence ===
Bakun’s scientific findings influenced ecosystem-based fisheries management approaches and international marine conservation policy frameworks, particularly through his advisory roles with NOAA and FAO.

== Recognition and awards ==
Bakun received the Great Medal of Prince Albert I of Monaco, one of the most prestigious international honors in marine science, in recognition of his contributions to oceanography and fisheries research.

== Selected publications ==
This section lists selected influential works and is not intended as a comprehensive bibliography.

- Bakun, A. (1973). Coastal upwelling indices, west coast of North America, 1946–71. NOAA Technical Report NMFS SSRF-671.
- Bakun, Andrew (1990). "Global Climate Change and Intensification of Coastal Ocean Upwelling". Science. 247 (4939): 198–201. Bibcode:1990Sci...247..198B. doi:10.1126/science.247.4939.198. PMID 17813287.
- Bakun, Andrew; Field, David B.; Redondo-Rodriguez, ANA; Weeks, Scarla J. (2010). "Greenhouse gas, upwelling-favorable winds, and the future of coastal ocean upwelling ecosystems". Global Change Biology. 16 (4): 1213–1228. Bibcode:2010GCBio..16.1213B. doi:10.1111/j.1365-2486.2009.02094.x.
- Bakun, A. (1996). Patterns in the Ocean: Ocean Processes and Marine Population Dynamics. California Sea Grant.
- Di Lorenzo, Emanuele (2015). "The future of coastal ocean upwelling". Nature. 518 (7539): 310–311. doi:10.1038/518310a. PMID 25693560.

== Media Appearances ==
Bakun appeared as an expert in the PBS documentary series Strange Days on Planet Earth (Episode Six: “Dirty Secrets”), where he discussed marine ecological processes and the impacts of fishing and climate on coastal ecosystems. In the related educational materials for the series, he described his scientific perspective as seeing “marine ecosystems as continually changing, developing, and evolving systems — like a ‘symphony’” and expressed fascination with how emerging ideas can account for observational patterns in the ocean.

In 2004, an article in the New York Times titled “Earth’s Uncanned Crusaders: Will Sardines Save Our Skin?” and another article published in Science titled “Sardines to the Rescue” were written about Andrew Bakun’s and Scarla J. Weeks’ research off the west coast of Africa. The articles summarized his findings, pointing toward how sardine feeding behavior reduced undersea gas eruption events, helping to curb climate change.
