= Bakun upwelling index =

Estimate of wind-driven coastal upwelling

The Bakun upwelling index (also called the Bakun Index or upwelling index) is a numerical estimate of wind-driven coastal upwelling intensity derived from the offshore component of Ekman transport near the coast. It was introduced by Andrew Bakun in a National Oceanic and Atmospheric Administration (NOAA) technical report presenting monthly indices for locations along the west coast of North America beginning in 1946.

== Definition ==
The index is based on the physical principle that equatorward, alongshore winds in the Northern Hemisphere drive surface waters offshore through Ekman transport, requiring replacement by deeper water that rises into the surface layer, a process known as upwelling. In Bakun’s original formulation, the index represents offshore Ekman surface transport as an indicator of wind forcing favorable to coastal upwelling.

== Units ==
In Bakun’s original tables, the index is reported in metric tons per second per 100 meters of coastline, a unit commonly treated as equivalent to cubic meters per second per 100 meters of coastline for indexing purposes.

== Computation and data sources ==
Bakun (1973) computed monthly indices from monthly mean sea-level atmospheric pressure fields, which were used to estimate surface winds, wind stress, and Ekman transport.

Subsequent NOAA documentation describes the upwelling-index calculation as involving estimation of near-surface winds from analyzed pressure fields, conversion of winds to wind stress using a drag formulation, and computation of Ekman transport resolved relative to local coastline orientation.

Monthly Bakun upwelling index time series are distributed by NOAA’s Physical Sciences Laboratory at standard offshore grid points, with reference to Bakun’s original reports and later compilations.

== Sign convention ==
Sign conventions for the Bakun upwelling index vary among formulations and data products. In some NOAA and Pacific Fisheries Environmental Laboratory (PFEL) documentation, offshore Ekman transport is treated as negative, and the sign is reversed so that positive index values correspond to upwelling-favorable conditions. Dataset documentation specifies the applicable convention.

== Scientific uses ==
The Bakun upwelling index has been widely used as a proxy for wind forcing favorable to coastal upwelling in studies of eastern boundary current systems, marine ecosystems, fisheries variability, and climate variability, particularly in the California Current region.

== Limitations and later developments ==
The Bakun upwelling index primarily represents wind-driven Ekman transport and does not explicitly account for other processes that can influence coastal upwelling and nearshore vertical transport, such as effects associated with geostrophic current or wind-stress curl. Later studies have proposed alternative or improved upwelling indices for the U.S. West Coast that incorporate additional physical mechanisms and are available for more recent periods.
