= North Pacific Gyre =

Major circulating system of ocean currents

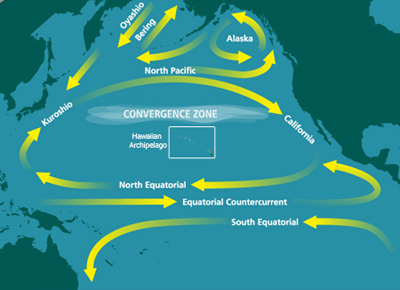
Significant ocean currents involved in the circulation of the North Pacific Subtropical and Subpolar gyres

The North Pacific Gyre (NPG) or North Pacific Subtropical Gyre (NPSG), located in the northern Pacific Ocean, is one of the five major oceanic gyres. This gyre covers most of the northern Pacific Ocean. It is the largest ecosystem on Earth, located between the equator and 50° N latitude, and comprising 20 million square kilometers. The gyre has a clockwise circular pattern and is formed by four prevailing ocean currents: the North Pacific Current to the north, the California Current to the east, the North Equatorial Current to the south, and the Kuroshio Current to the west. It is the site of an unusually intense collection of human-created marine debris, known as the Great Pacific Garbage Patch.

The North Pacific Subtropical Gyre and the much smaller North Pacific Subpolar Gyre make up the two major gyre systems in the mid-latitudes of the Northern Pacific Ocean. This two-gyre circulation in the North Pacific is driven by the trade and westerly winds. This is one of the best examples of all of Earth's oceans where these winds drive a two-gyre circulation. Physical characteristics like weak thermohaline circulation in the North Pacific and the fact that it is mostly blocked by land in the north, also help facilitate this circulation. As depth increases, these gyres in the North Pacific grow smaller and weaker, and the high pressure at the center of the Subtropical Gyre will migrate poleward and westward.

== Physical oceanography ==
=== Subtropical circulation in the North Pacific ===
Like all subtropical gyre systems, the North Pacific Subtropical Gyre is an anticyclone; since it is in the Northern Hemisphere this means its circulation is in a clockwise direction around its high pressure at the center. This circulation is also associated with equatorward Sverdrup transport and Ekman downwelling. Ekman transport causes water to flow toward the center of the gyre, creating a sloped sea-surface, and initiating geostrophic flow. Harald Sverdrup applied Ekman transport while including pressure gradient forces to develop a theory for Sverdrup transport.

The Kuroshio Current is the narrow, strong westward boundary current of the subtropical circulation. This current influences the water column all the way to the bottom. The Kuroshio current flows in a northerly direction, then eventually flows further from the westward boundary where it then takes an eastward direction into the North Pacific. This eastward flowing current is then called the Kuroshio Extension. The North Pacific Current is located just north of the Subtropical Gyre and flows in an easterly direction. Also, known as the West Wind Drift or the Subarctic Current, the North Pacific Current also includes the westward flow of the southern boundary of the North Pacific Subpolar Gyre. The North Equatorial Current borders the North Pacific Subtropical Gyre on the south and flows in a westerly direction. The westward flow within the elongated tropical cyclonic circulation is also included in the North Equatorial current. The California Current System comprises the eastern boundary of the North Pacific Subtropical Gyre and flows south along the coast of California. Here coastal upwelling drives the eastern boundary current and an undercurrent that flows poleward.

In the western region of the North Pacific, the surface of the Subtropical Gyre generally has a "C-shape". The Kuroshio current and Kuroshio Extension roughly form the outside of this "C-shape" where it then turns westwards into recirculation, where it then flows south parallel to the Kuroshio Current. From here the "C-shape" then flows eastward comprising the Subtropical Countercurrent at roughly 20–25°N, then finally the "C" wraps back towards the west forming the North Equatorial Current just south of 20°N. It is common for subtropical gyres to have this "C-shape" surface flow. The Subtropical Countercurrent is a shallow area of this "C"; at only about 250 dbar under the surface, circulation is a simpler closed, anticyclonic gyre.

Narrow east-west frontal zones that cross the Pacific are less than 100 km wide. The Subarctic Frontal Zone or Subarctic Boundary, about 42°N, is fixed in the North Pacific Current. The Subarctic Frontal Zone, slightly south of the maximum westerly wind speeds, separates the North Pacific Subpolar Gyre from the Subtropical Gyre. In the central and eastern Pacific at roughly 32°N is the Subtropical Frontal Zone. Sometimes referred to as the Subtropical Convergence Zone, this frontal zone serves as the boundary between the west flowing North Equatorial Current from the North Pacific Current. With increasing depth in the North Pacific Subtropical Gyre, it gets smaller in the western region near Japan and it also loses strength. The Subtropical Gyre does not exist below 1500 m below the surface with the exception of the Kuroshio Current and Extension regions.

==== Circulation dependence on depth ====
The North Pacific Subtropical Gyre diminishes spatially with increasing depth. Similar to all subtropical gyre systems, the North Pacific Subtropical Gyre shrinks towards its most energetic surface flows, in a northwestern direction between the Kuroshio Current and the Kuroshio Extension. This is drastic shrinkage from the surface to about 200 m below. At the surface, the boundary that separates the westward and eastward flows from south of 20°N to about 25–30°N at 200 m. The "C-shape" in the western region of the Subtropical Gyre, including the Subtropical Countercurrent, generally does not exist below 200 m. At about 1000–1500 m, the Subtropical Gyre is located entirely in the western region of the North Pacific near the Kuroshio Current and Kuroshio Extension. In the subtropical regions, flow is weak where influences from the Subtropical Gyre are minimal. Differences in steric heights over distances of 1000 km are on the order of 1 cm, rather than the differences of 10 cm within the area of the North Pacific Subtropical Gyre.

== Garbage patch ==
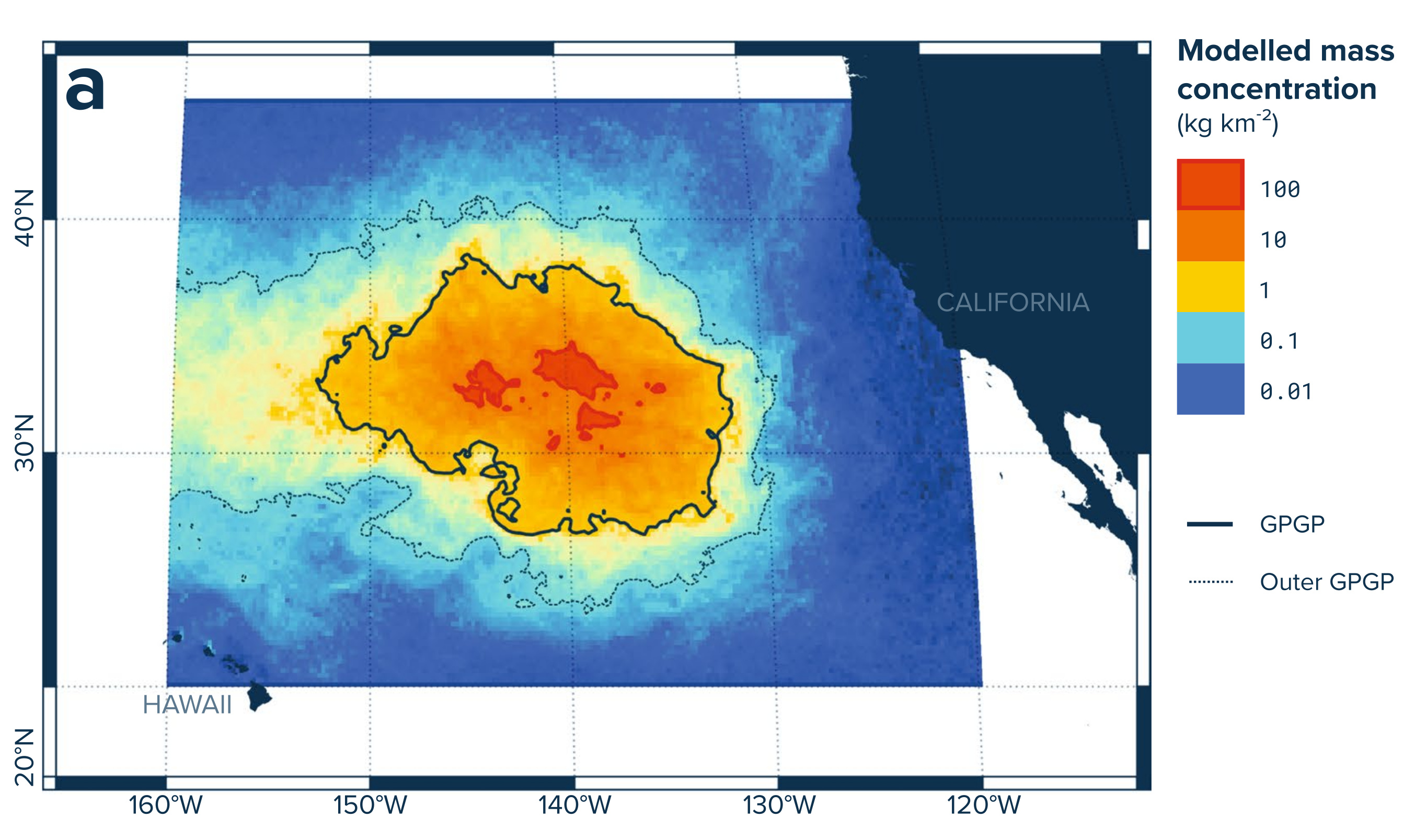
Great Pacific Garbage Patch in August 2015 (model)

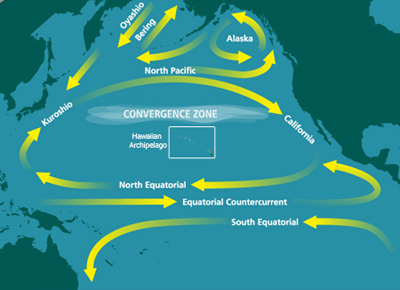
The patch is created in the gyre of the North Pacific Subtropical Convergence Zone.

The Great Pacific Garbage Patch (also Pacific trash vortex and North Pacific Garbage Patch) is a garbage patch, a gyre of marine debris particles, in the central North Pacific Ocean. It is located roughly from 135°W to 155°W and 35°N to 42°N. The collection of plastic and floating trash originates from the Pacific Rim, including countries in Asia, North America, and South America.

Despite the common public perception of the patch existing as giant islands of floating garbage, its low density (4 particles per cubic metre (3.1/yd^{3})) prevents detection by satellite imagery, or even by casual boaters or divers in the area. This is because the patch is a widely dispersed area consisting primarily of suspended "fingernail-sized or smaller"—often microscopic—particles in the upper water column known as microplastics.

Researchers from the Ocean Cleanup project claimed that the patch covers 1.6 million square kilometres (620,000 square miles) consisting of 45,000–129,000 metric tons (50,000–142,000 short tons) of plastic as of 2018, later growing to twice the size of Texas. By the end of 2024, the Ocean Cleanup had removed more than one million pounds of trash from the Great Pacific Garbage Patch, or 0.5% of the total accumulated trash. While microplastics dominate the area by count, 92% of the mass of the patch consists of larger objects. Some of the plastic is over 50 years old, and includes items (and fragments of items) such as "plastic lighters, toothbrushes, water bottles, pens, baby bottles, cell phones, plastic bags, and nurdles".

Research indicates that the patch is rapidly accumulating. The patch is believed to have increased "10-fold each decade" since 1945. The gyre contains approximately six pounds of plastic for every pound of plankton. A similar patch of floating plastic debris is found in the Atlantic Ocean, called the North Atlantic garbage patch.

== See also ==
- Andrés de Urdaneta
- Ecosystem of the North Pacific Subtropical Gyre
- Great Pacific Garbage Patch
- Marine pollution
- North Atlantic garbage patch
- Ocean current
- South Atlantic Gyre
