= First relation letter from Pedro de Valdivia to emperor Charles V =

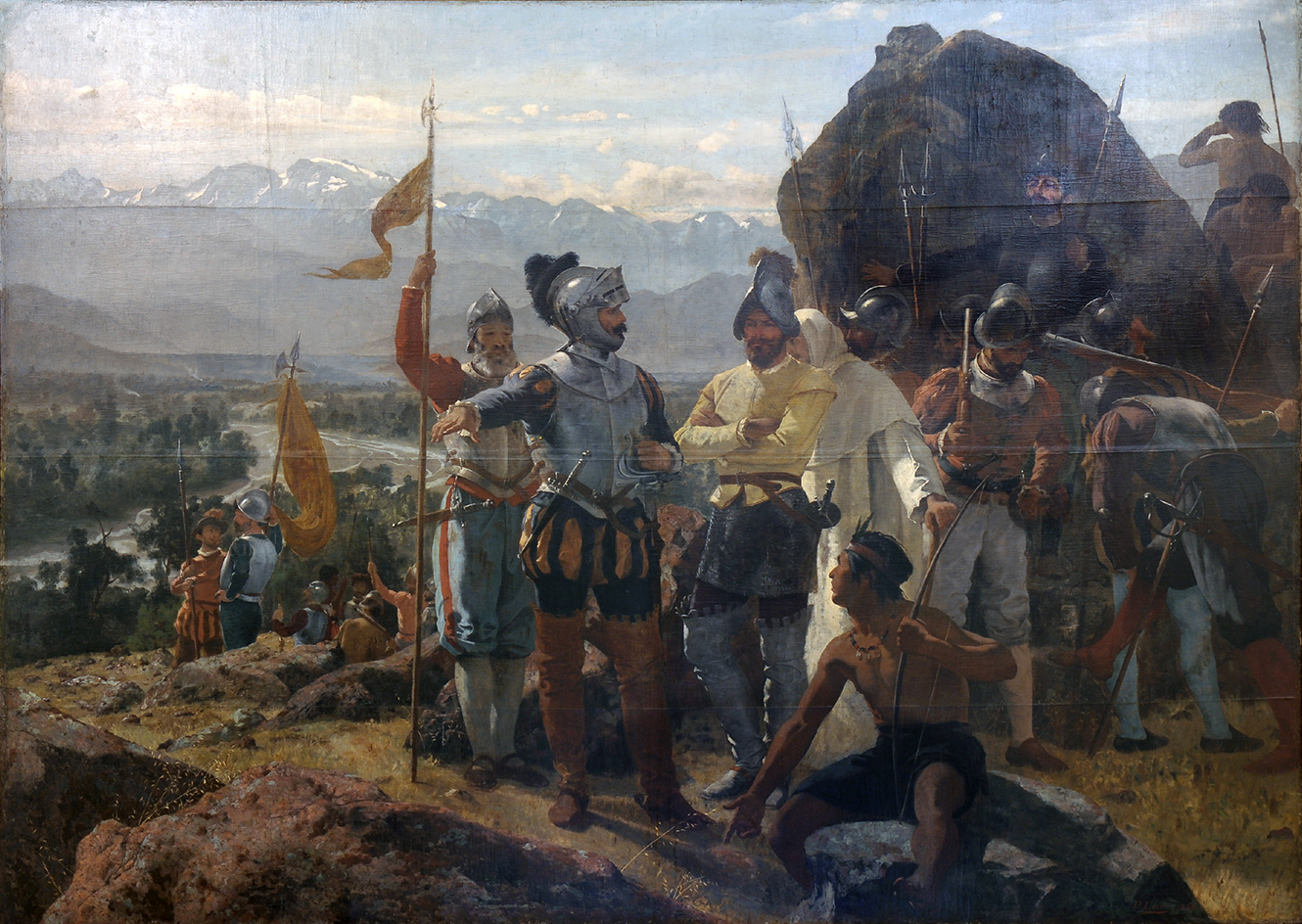
Pedro Lira's 1889 painting of the founding of Santiago in 1541 by Pedro de Valdivia at Huelén Hill.

The First relation letter from Pedro de Valdivia to emperor Charles V is one of the six Letters of relation written by Pedro de Valdivia to Charles V, Holy Roman Emperor by his name in the Holy Roman Empire in which he relates his journey to Chile and the conquest of that land. This first letter was dated on 20 August 1545, the late winter of the southern hemisphere. It differs from other letters sent from conquistadores to Charles V by emphasizing the difficulties, called "trabajos", literally "works" in the letter, of conquest.

It [Chile] has four months of winter, no more, and in them, except when there is a quarter moon, when it rains one or two days, all the other days have such a beautiful sunshine that is not necessary to resort to fire. The summer is so temperate, with delicious airs, that man can go all day under the sun. It is rich in pastures and cultivated fields, in which all kind of animals and plants can be bred or grown, there is plenty of very beautiful wood for making houses, and plenty of firewood, and rich gold mines, and all land is full of them...

— Excerpt from the letter.
