= Upwelling =

Oceanographic phenomenon of wind-driven motion of ocean water

If the wind blows parallel to the coast in the southern hemisphere (such as along the coast of Peru, where the wind blows North), Ekman transport can produce a net movement of surface water 90° to the left, which may result in coastal upwelling.

Upwelling is an oceanographic phenomenon that involves wind-driven motion of dense, cooler, and usually nutrient-rich water from deep water towards the ocean surface. It replaces the warmer and usually nutrient-depleted surface water. The nutrient-rich upwelled water stimulates the growth and reproduction of primary producers such as phytoplankton. The biomass of phytoplankton and the presence of cool water in those regions allow upwelling zones to be identified by cool sea surface temperatures (SST) and high concentrations of chlorophyll a.

The increased availability of nutrients in upwelling regions results in high levels of primary production and thus fishery production. Approximately 25% of the total global marine fish catches come from five upwellings, which occupy only 5% of the total ocean area. Upwellings that are driven by coastal currents or diverging open ocean have the greatest impact on nutrient-enriched waters and global fishery yields.

== Mechanisms ==
The three main drivers that work together to cause upwelling are wind, Coriolis effect, and Ekman transport. They operate differently for different types of upwelling, but the general effects are the same. In the overall process of upwelling, winds blow across the sea surface at a particular direction, which causes a wind-water interaction. As a result of the wind, the water has transported a net of 90 degrees from the direction of the wind due to Coriolis forces and Ekman transport. Ekman transport causes the surface layer of water to move at about a 45-degree angle from the direction of the wind, and the friction between that layer and the layer beneath it causes the successive layers to move in the same direction. This results in a spiral of water moving down the water column. Then, it is the Coriolis forces that dictate which way the water will move; in the Northern hemisphere, the water is transported to the right of the direction of the wind. In the Southern Hemisphere, the water is transported to the left of the wind. If this net movement of water is divergent, then upwelling of deep water occurs to replace the water that was lost.

== Types ==
The major upwellings in the ocean are associated with the divergence of currents that bring deeper, colder, nutrient rich waters to the surface. There are at least five types of upwelling: coastal upwelling, large-scale wind-driven upwelling in the ocean interior, upwelling associated with eddies, topographically-associated upwelling, and broad-diffusive upwelling in the ocean interior.

=== Coastal ===
Coastal upwelling is the best known type of upwelling, and the most closely related to human activities as it supports some of the most productive fisheries in the world. Coastal upwelling will occur if the wind direction is parallel to the coastline and generates wind-driven currents. The wind-driven currents are diverted to the right of the winds in the Northern Hemisphere and to the left in the Southern Hemisphere due to the Coriolis effect. The result is a net movement of surface water at right angles to the direction of the wind, known as the Ekman transport (See also Ekman Spiral). When Ekman transport is occurring away from the coast, surface waters moving away are replaced by deeper, colder, and denser water. Normally, this upwelling process occurs at a rate of about 5–10 meters per day, but the rate and proximity of upwelling to the coast can be changed due to the strength and distance of the wind.

Deep waters are rich in nutrients, including nitrate, phosphate and silicic acid, themselves the result of decomposition of sinking organic matter (dead/detrital plankton) from surface waters. When brought to the surface, these nutrients are utilized by phytoplankton, along with dissolved CO_{2} (carbon dioxide) and light energy from the sun, to produce organic compounds, through the process of photosynthesis. Upwelling regions therefore result in very high levels of primary production (the amount of carbon fixed by phytoplankton) in comparison to other areas of the ocean. They account for about 50% of global marine productivity. High primary production propagates up the food chain because phytoplankton are at the base of the oceanic food chain.

The food chain follows the course of:

- Phytoplankton → Zooplankton → Predatory zooplankton → Filter feeders → Predatory fish → Marine birds, marine mammals

Coastal upwelling exists year-round in some regions, known as major coastal upwelling systems, and only in certain months of the year in other regions, known as seasonal coastal upwelling systems. Many of these upwelling systems are associated with relatively high carbon productivity and hence are classified as Large Marine Ecosystems.

Worldwide, there are five major coastal currents associated with upwelling areas: the Canary Current (off Northwest Africa), the Benguela Current (off southern Africa), the California Current (off California and Oregon), the Humboldt Current (off Peru and Chile), and the Somali Current (off Somalia and Oman). All of these currents support major fisheries. The four major eastern boundary currents in which coastal upwelling primarily occurs are the Canary Current, Benguela Current, California Current, and Humboldt Current. The Benguela Current is the eastern boundary of the South Atlantic subtropical gyre and can be divided into a northern and southern sub-system with upwelling occurring in both areas. The subsystems are divided by an area of permanent upwelling off of Luderitz, which is the strongest upwelling zone in the world. The California Current System (CCS) is an eastern boundary current of the North Pacific that is also characterized by a north and south split. The split in this system occurs at Point Conception, California due to weak upwelling in the South and strong upwelling in the north. The Canary Current is an eastern boundary current of the North Atlantic Gyre and is also separated due to the presence of the Canary Islands. Finally, the Humboldt Current or the Peru Current flows west along the coast of South America from Peru to Chile and extends up to 1,000 kilometers offshore. These four eastern boundary currents comprise the majority of coastal upwelling zones in the oceans.

==== Equatorial ====
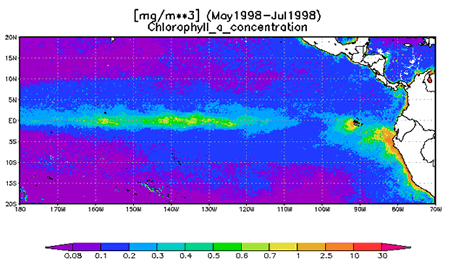
Effects of equatorial upwelling on surface chlorophyll concentrations in the Pacific Ocean

Upwelling at the equator is associated with the Intertropical Convergence Zone (ITCZ) which actually moves, and consequently, is often located just north or south of the equator. Easterly (westward) trade winds blow from the Northeast and Southeast and converge along the equator blowing West to form the ITCZ. Although there are no Coriolis forces present along the equator, upwelling still occurs just north and south of the equator. This results in a divergence, with denser, nutrient-rich water being upwelled from below, and results in the remarkable fact that the equatorial region in the Pacific can be detected from space as a broad line of high phytoplankton concentration.

==== Southern Ocean ====
Upwelling in the Southern Ocean

Large-scale upwelling is also found in the Southern Ocean. Here, strong westerly (eastward) winds blow around Antarctica, driving a significant flow of water northwards. This is actually a type of coastal upwelling. Since there are no continents in a band of open latitudes between South America and the tip of the Antarctic Peninsula, some of this water is drawn up from great depths. In many numerical models and observational syntheses, the Southern Ocean upwelling represents the primary means by which deep dense water is brought to the surface. In some regions of Antarctica, wind-driven upwelling near the coast pulls relatively warm Circumpolar deep water onto the continental shelf, where it can enhance ice shelf melt and influence ice sheet stability. Shallower, wind-driven upwelling is also found off the west coasts of North and South America, northwest and southwest Africa, and southwest and south Australia, all associated with oceanic subtropical high pressure circulations (see coastal upwelling above).

Some models of the ocean circulation suggest that broad-scale upwelling occurs in the tropics, as pressure driven flows converge water toward the low latitudes where it is diffusively warmed from above. The required diffusion coefficients, however, appear to be larger than are observed in the real ocean. Nonetheless, some diffusive upwelling does probably occur.

==== Other sources ====
- Local and intermittent upwellings may occur when offshore islands, ridges, or seamounts cause a deflection of deep currents, providing a nutrient rich area in otherwise low productivity ocean areas. Examples include upwellings around the Galapagos Islands and the Seychelles Islands, which have major pelagic fisheries.
- Upwelling could occur anywhere as long as there is an adequate shear in the horizontal wind field. For example when a tropical cyclone transits an area, usually when moving at speeds of less than 5 mph (8 km/h). The cyclonic winds cause a divergence in the surface water in the Ekman layer, that turn requires upwelling of deeper water to maintain continuity.
- Artificial upwelling is produced by devices that use ocean wave energy or ocean thermal energy conversion to pump water to the surface. Ocean wind turbines are also known to produce upwellings. Ocean wave devices have been shown to produce plankton blooms.

== Variations ==
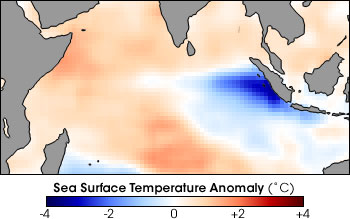
Unusually strong winds from the east push warm (red) surface water towards Africa, allowing cold (blue) water to upwell along the Sumatran coast

Upwelling intensity depends on wind strength and seasonal variability, as well as the vertical structure of the water, variations in the bottom bathymetry, and instabilities in the currents.

In some areas, upwelling is a seasonal event leading to periodic bursts of productivity similar to spring blooms in coastal waters. Wind-induced upwelling is generated by temperature differences between the warm, light air above the land and the cooler denser air over the sea. In temperate latitudes, the temperature contrast is greatly seasonably variable, creating periods of strong upwelling in the spring and summer, to weak or no upwelling in the winter. For example, off the coast of Oregon, there are four or five strong upwelling events separated by periods of little to no upwelling during the six-month season of upwelling. In contrast, tropical latitudes have a more constant temperature contrast, creating constant upwelling throughout the year. The Peruvian upwelling, for instance, occurs throughout most of the year, resulting in one of the world's largest marine fisheries for sardines and anchovies.

In anomalous years when the trade winds weaken or reverse, the water that is upwelled is much warmer and low in nutrients, resulting in a sharp reduction in the biomass and phytoplankton productivity. This event is known as the El Nino-Southern Oscillation (ENSO) event. The Peruvian upwelling system is particularly vulnerable to ENSO events, and can cause extreme interannual variability in productivity.

Changes in bathymetry can affect the strength of an upwelling. For example, a submarine ridge that extends out from the coast will produce more favorable upwelling conditions than neighboring regions. Upwelling typically begins at such ridges and remains strongest at the ridge even after developing in other locations.

== High productivity ==
The most productive and fertile ocean areas, upwelling regions are important sources of marine productivity. They attract hundreds of species throughout the trophic levels; these systems' diversity has been a focal point for marine research. While studying the trophic levels and patterns typical of upwelling regions, researchers have discovered that upwelling systems exhibit a wasp-waist richness pattern. In this type of pattern, the high and low trophic levels are well-represented by high species diversity. However, the intermediate trophic level is only represented by one or two species. This trophic layer, which consists of small, pelagic fish usually makes up about only three to four percent of the species diversity of all fish species present. The lower trophic layers are very well-represented with about 500 species of copepods, 2500 species of gastropods, and 2500 species of crustaceans on average. At the apex and near-apex trophic levels, there are usually about 100 species of marine mammals and about 50 species of marine birds. The vital intermediate trophic species however are small pelagic fish that usually feed on phytoplankton. In most upwelling systems, these species are either anchovies or sardines, and usually only one is present, although two or three species may be present occasionally. These fish are an important food source for predators, such as large pelagic fish, marine mammals, and marine birds. Although they are not at the base of the trophic pyramid, they are the vital species that connect the entire marine ecosystem and keep the productivity of upwelling zones so high

== Threats to upwelling ecosystems ==
A major threat to both this crucial intermediate trophic level and the entire upwelling trophic ecosystem is the problem of commercial fishing. Since upwelling regions are the most productive and species rich areas in the world, they attract a high number of commercial fishers and fisheries. On one hand, this is another benefit of the upwelling process as it serves as a viable source of food and income for so many people and nations besides marine animals. However, just as in any ecosystem, the consequences of over-fishing from a population could be detrimental to that population and the ecosystem as a whole. In upwelling ecosystems, every species present plays a vital role in the functioning of that ecosystem. If one species is significantly depleted, that will have an effect throughout the rest of the trophic levels. For example, if a popular prey species is targeted by fisheries, fishermen may collect hundreds of thousands of individuals of this species just by casting their nets into the upwelling waters. As these fish are depleted, the food source for those who preyed on these fish is depleted. Therefore, the predators of the targeted fish will begin to die off, and there will not be as many of them to feed the predators above them. This system continues throughout the entire food chain, resulting in a possible collapse of the ecosystem. It is possible that the ecosystem may be restored over time, but not all species can recover from events such as these. Even if the species can adapt, there may be a delay in the reconstruction of this upwelling community.

The possibility of such an ecosystem collapse is the very danger of fisheries in upwelling regions. Fisheries may target a variety of different species, and therefore they are a direct threat to many species in the ecosystem, however they pose the highest threat to the intermediate pelagic fish. Since these fish form the crux of the entire trophic process of upwelling ecosystems, they are highly represented throughout the ecosystem (even if there is only one species present). Unfortunately, these fish tend to be the most popular targets of fisheries as about 64 percent of their entire catch consists of pelagic fish. Among those, the six main species that usually form the intermediate trophic layer represent over half of the catch.

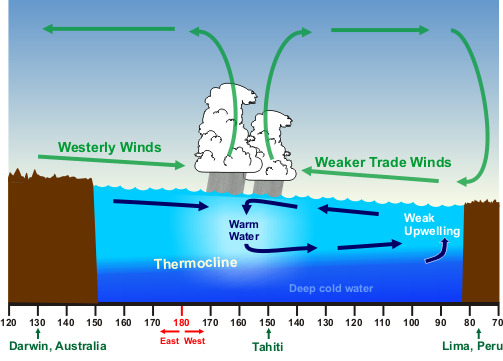
During an El Niño, wind indirectly drives warm water to the South American coast, reducing the effects of cold upwelling.

Besides directly causing the collapse of the ecosystem due to their absence, this can create problems in the ecosystem through a variety of other methods as well. The animals higher in the trophic levels may not completely starve to death and die off, but the decreased food supply could still hurt the populations. If animals do not get enough food, it will decrease their reproductive viability meaning that they will not breed as often or as successfully as usual. This can lead to a decreasing population, especially in species that do not breed often under normal circumstances or become reproductively mature late in life. Another problem is that the decrease in the population of a species due to fisheries can lead to a decrease in genetic diversity, resulting in a decrease in biodiversity of a species. If the species diversity is decreased significantly, this could cause problems for the species in an environment that is so variable and quick-changing; they may not be able to adapt, which could result in a collapse of the population or ecosystem.

Another threat to the productivity and ecosystems of upwelling regions is El Niño-Southern Oscillation (ENSO) system, or more specifically El Niño events. During the normal period and La Niña events, the easterly trade winds are still strong, which continues to drive the process of upwelling. However, during El Niño events, trade winds are weaker, causing decreased upwelling in the equatorial regions as the divergence of water north and south of the equator is not as strong or as prevalent. The coastal upwelling zones diminish as well since they are wind driven systems, and the wind is no longer a very strong driving force in these areas. As a result, global upwelling drastically decreases, causing a decrease in productivity as the waters are no longer receiving nutrient-rich water. Without these nutrients, the rest of the trophic pyramid cannot be sustained, and the rich upwelling ecosystem will collapse.

== Effect on climate ==
Coastal upwelling has a major influence over the affected region's local climate. This effect is magnified if the ocean current is already cool. As the cold, nutrient-rich water moves upwards and the sea surface temperature gets cooler, the air immediately above it also cools down and is likely to condensate, forming sea fog and stratus clouds. This also inhibits the formation of higher altitude clouds, showers and thunderstorms and results in rainfall over the ocean leaving the land dry. In year-round upwelling systems (like that of the western coasts of Southern Africa and South America), temperatures are generally cooler and precipitation scarce. Seasonal upwelling systems are often paired with seasonal downwelling systems (like that of the western coasts of the United States and Iberian Peninsula), resulting in cooler, drier than average summers and milder, wetter than average winters. Permanent upwelling locations typically have semi-arid/desert climates while seasonal upwelling locations usually have Mediterranean/semi-arid climates, oceanic in some cases. Some worldwide cities affected by strong upwelling regimes include: San Francisco, Antofagasta, Sines, Essaouira, Walvis Bay, Curaçao among others.

== See also ==
- Bakun upwelling index – Estimate of wind-driven coastal upwelling
