= California Current =

Pacific Ocean current

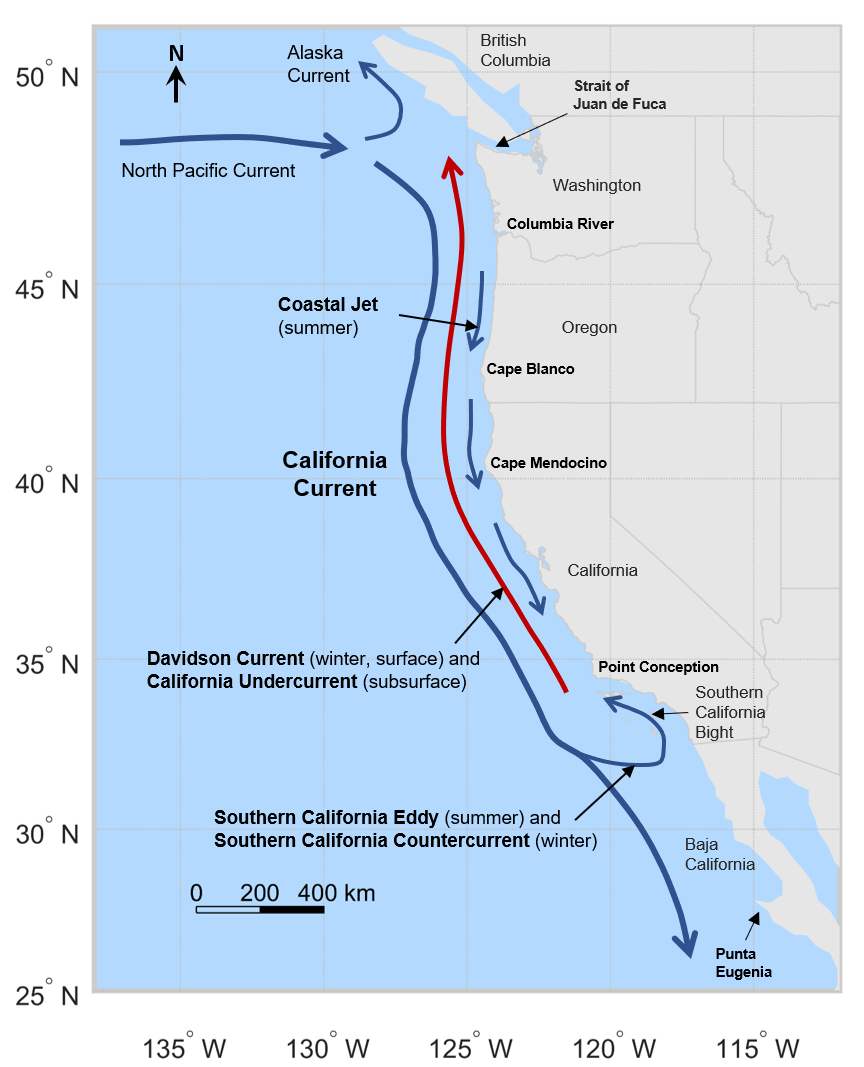
Major currents in the California Current System: the California Current (the bulkier, vertical blue line), the coastal jet, the Davidson Current and California Undercurrent, and the Southern California Eddy/Countercurrent.

The California Current (Spanish: Corriente de California) is a cold water Pacific Ocean current that moves southward along the western coast of North America, beginning off southern British Columbia and ending off southern Baja California Sur. It is considered an Eastern boundary current due to the influence of the North American coastline on its course. It is also one of six major coastal currents affiliated with strong upwelling zones, the others being the Humboldt Current, the Canary Current, the Benguela Current, the Oyashio Current, and the Somali Current. The California Current is part of the North Pacific Gyre, a large swirling current that occupies the northern basin of the Pacific.

The related California Current Conservation Complex is a grouping of federally-designated marine protected areas that have been on the UNESCO list of tentative World Heritage Sites since 2017, which includes the following areas found throughout the current: the Point Reyes National Seashore, the Golden Gate National Recreation Area, the Monterey Bay, Greater Farallones and Cordell Bank National Marine Sanctuaries, the Farallon Islands National Wildlife Refuge, and the California Coastal National Monument.

== Physical properties ==
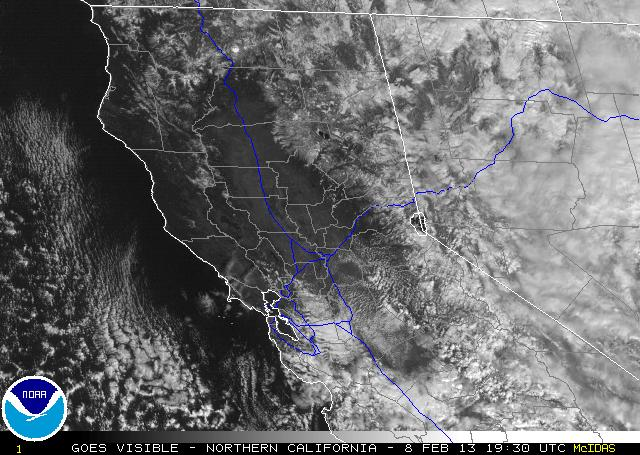
The lack of clouds along the coast (and also along the Central Valley of California) is due to an offshore wind blowing drier air from the land offshore.

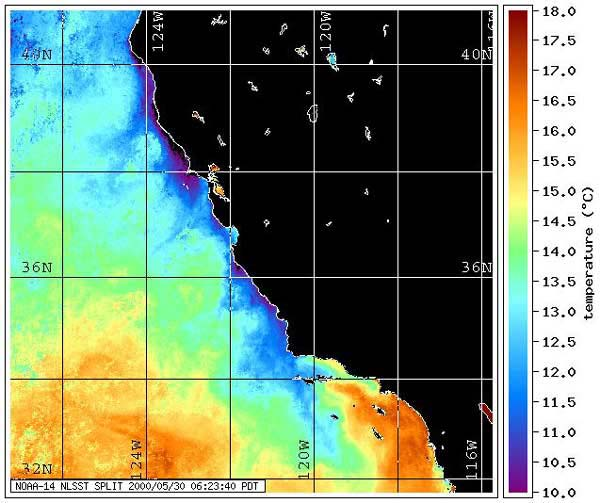
Upwelling process off the coast of California bringing cooler, nutrient rich water up to the surface.

The movement of Alaskan and northern Pacific ocean currents southward down the west coast results in much cooler ocean temperatures than at comparable latitudes on the east coast of the United States, where ocean currents come from the Caribbean and tropical Atlantic. The cooler ocean current along the west coast also makes summer temperatures cooler on the west coast compared to the east coast. For example, Half Moon Bay at 37°N has an average July high temperature of 67 °F (19 °C) while Virginia Beach, VA, close to the same latitude, has an average July high temperature of 89 °F (32 °C).

Additionally, extensive upwelling of colder sub-surface waters occurs along the West Coast of the United States, caused by the prevailing northwesterly winds acting through the Ekman Effect. The winds drive surface water to the right of the wind flow, that is offshore, which draws water up from below to replace it. The upwelling further cools the already cool California Current. This is the mechanism that produces California's characteristic coastal fog and cool ocean waters. As a result, ocean surf temperatures are much colder in summer along the Pacific coast than the Atlantic coast at the same latitude. For example, the average July SST (sea surface temperature) at New York City at 40.7°N is 73 °F (23 °C), while at the same latitude in Eureka, CA is 57 °F (14 °C). As such, ocean surf temperatures are rarely above 70 F during the summer along the California south coast, while they are often above 82 °F (28 °C) on the east coast from North Carolina southward.

The cold water is highly productive due to the upwelling, which brings to the surface nutrient-rich sediments, supporting large populations of whales, seabirds and important fisheries. Winds of the appropriate direction and strength to induce upwelling are more prevalent in the presence of Eastern boundary currents, such as the California Current. Phytoplankton production is dramatically increased in these areas because the nutrient-rich water lying below the pycnocline is relatively close to the surface and is thus easily upwelled. Scientists at the Scripps Institution of Oceanography said in 2011 that the average surface temperature of the water at Scripps Pier has increased by almost 3 degrees since 1950.

The Bakun upwelling index is based on a 20-year average of the monthly mean Ekman transport for different regions off the California coast since the 1970s. It ranges from 300 m³/s (in the offshore direction) to −212 m³/s (toward the coast, or onshore direction). There is year-round upwelling off Southern California's coast, but it is strongest in the summer months. Off the coast of Oregon and Washington, there is forceful downwelling in the winter months, and upwelling in the region is restricted to the months of April through September. Other measures have also been proposed for this important seawater system, although some rely on shorter data series. For example, using data series available since 1988, the Coastal Upwelling Transport Index and the Biologically Effective Upwelling Transport Index provide improved estimates of vertical transport and vertical nitrate flux.

Measurements relevant to this current have only been made with instruments since 1946. Prior to this date, the processes, and especially the nutrient status of waters, have to be inferred from historic data sources. One example are the nitrogen isotope ratios in macroalgae.

== Biological properties ==
Primary production is a topic of interest among those who study the California Current. In their study, Hayward and Venrick (1982) found great variability in both biomass and the productivity of phytoplankton in the California Current. The differences observed by Hayward and Venrick in carbon-fixation rates (0.2–2.0 grams carbon/(meter-squared × day)) show the heterogeneous nature of the California Current, with its combination of advected (see advection) and upwelled water. Several studies have investigated the carbon flow from primary production to the pelagic fish stocks which depend on the California Current. Lasker (1988) described powerful "jets and squirts" off northern and central California. These 'jets and squirts' move large quantities of cold, nutrient rich water offshore. This water then gets carried by the southward bound California Current and adds significant primary production to the sardine population.

== Related currents ==
A narrower, weaker counter current, the Davidson Current, occasionally moves somewhat warmer water northwards during the winter months. During El Niño events, the California Current is disrupted, leading to declines in phytoplankton, resulting in cascading effects up the food chain, such as declines in fisheries, seabird breeding failures and marine mammal mortality (Schwing et al., 2003). In 2005, a failure in the otherwise predictable upwelling events, unassociated with El Niño, caused a collapse in krill in the current, leading to similar effects (Schwing et al., 2003).

Within the Southern California Bight, a sub-region of the California Current has unique physical properties. Upwelling is fairly weak in the California Bight and Smith and Eppley (1982) stated that the 16-year average for primary production was 0.402 grams carbon/(meter-squared × day), or approximately 150 grams carbon/(meter-squared × year). Further, Smith and Eppley (1982) found that the highest daily rates of temperature decrease were correlated with the maximum amount of upwelling. Digiacomo and Holt (2001) used satellite images to study the mesoscale and sub-mesoscale eddies in the Southern California Bight. Their work showed that all eddies were less than 50 kilometres (31 mi) in diameter and 70% of all eddies measured less than 10 kilometres (6.2 mi). The eddies appeared to be caused mostly by topography (particularly islands), wind, and instabilities in the current. These eddies lay mainly between the California Current (flowing toward the equator) and the coastline. The majority of these eddies were cyclonic and had the ability to induce the upwelling of nutrient-rich water. Small scale topographic features such as headlands have been shown to cause substantial effects on the population dynamics of benthic invertebrates, such a change in the settlement patterns of crabs and sea urchin.

== In popular culture ==
In the 2016 Disney/Pixar animated film Finding Dory, the California Current is portrayed as a superhighway that fish and sea turtles use to travel to California. The characters Marlin (Albert Brooks), Nemo (Hayden Rolence), and Dory (Ellen DeGeneres) join Crush (Andrew Stanton), Squirt (Bennett Dammann) and a group of baby and adult sea turtles in using the California Current, to help them travel to Morro Bay, California to find her parents Jenny and Charlie.
