= Subtropical Countercurrent =

Narrow eastward ocean current in the central North Pacific Ocean

The subtropical countercurrent (STCC) is a narrow eastward ocean current in the central North Pacific Ocean (20–30°N) where the Sverdrup theory predicts a broad westward flow. It originates in the western North Pacific around 20°N, and flows eastward against the northeast trade winds and stretches northeastward to the north of Hawaii.

It is accompanied by a subsurface temperature and density front called the subtropical front, in thermal wind relation with the STCC. Furthermore, the STCC maintains a sea surface temperature front during winter and spring. During April and May when the SST front is still strong, the seasonal warming makes the region conductive to atmospheric convection, and surface wind stress curls turn weakly positive along the front on the background of negative curls that drive the subtropical gyre.

On the weather timescale, positive wind curls are related to low-pressure systems of a subsynoptic scale in space, energized by surface baroclinicity and latent heat release along the STF front. The SST front also anchors a meridional maximum in column-integrated water vapor, indicating a deep structure of the atmosphere response.
