= Riverfest =

Riverfest may refer to:

- Beloit Riverfest
- Cincinnati Bell/WEBN Riverfest
- Riverfest, Limerick
