= Belarusian protests =

Belarusian protests may refer to:

- Freedom March (1999)
- Jeans Revolution (2006)
- 2010 Ploshcha
- 2011 Belarusian protests
- Teddybear Airdrop Minsk 2012
- 2017 Belarusian protests
- 2020–2021 Belarusian protests
