= Rubber duck race =

Racing event

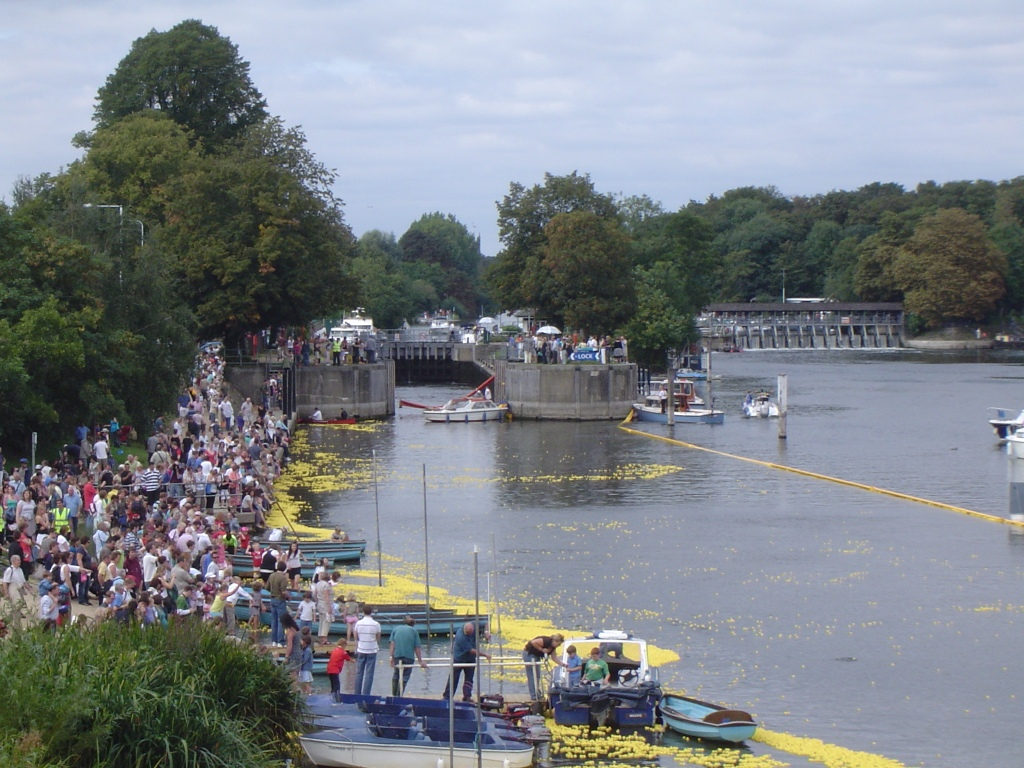
Great British Duck Race 2007

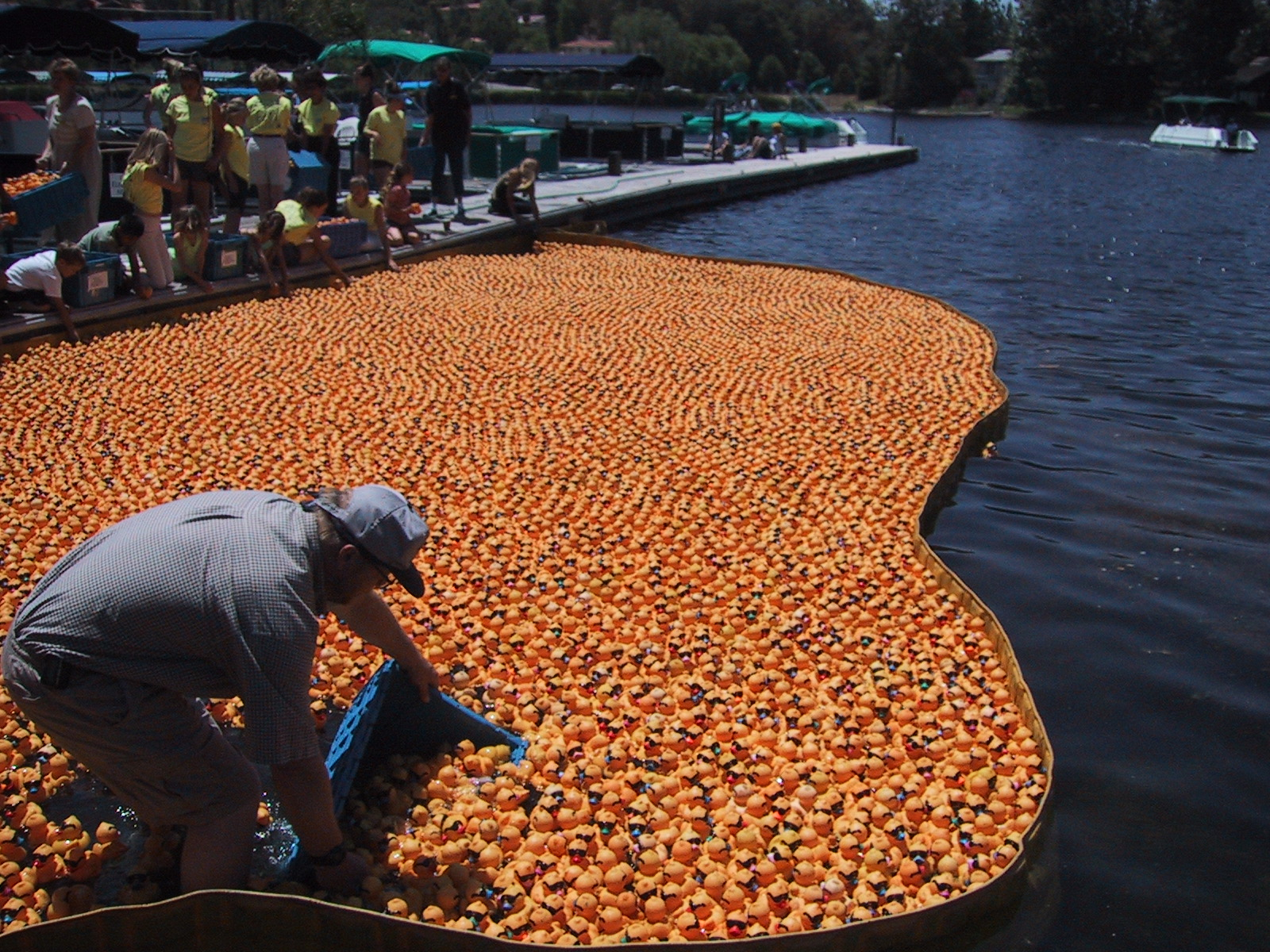
Great Conejo Rubber Duck Race, Westlake Village, California, 10 June 2001.

A rubber duck race is a type of festival where dozens to thousands of rubber ducks race on a river, usually within a town or city. They are often fundraising events in which the ducks are given numbers associated with participants so that ducks that perform well win a prize for the associated participant.

== Description and history ==
A rubber duck race is a type of festival where up to thousands of rubber ducks race on a river, usually in a place easily accessible to many people such as a city. Normally they are fundraising events and the ducks are given numbers, enabling the participants to "adopt" a rubber duck for a small amount of money. If the rubber duck wins or places well, the participants will win money or another prize of some sort. The proceeds of "adopting" a rubber duck go to the nonprofit organization that is in charge of the event. In legal terms, a rubber duck race would be classified as a raffle in Germany.

The location and origin of the first rubber duck race is unclear, with one source stating it took place in 1987 in Ottawa, Canada, while another says that a charity in Dyserth, Wales, held its first annual rubber duck race in 1980.

In the 1990s, rubber duck races spread across the industrialised world. Nowadays they are regarded as a more inventive kind of fundraising and the rubber duck is a symbol of the generosity of the organiser. In comparison to other types of raffles, a duck race involves a considerable amount of preparation. To some extent organisers are already afraid of potential risks, seeing as duck races apparently take place too often. The races are further controversial in terms of environmental protection, given that thousands of plastic objects are put into the water and there is no guarantee that all of them will be taken out of the water after the end of the race.

The number of rubber ducks used in such races differs considerably, with neighborhood races involving dozens to larger events with thousands. The biggest duck race to date has taken place on London's River Thames on 31 August 2008. It was called the Great British Duck Race, with 250,000 blue rubber ducks in use, thereby breaking their own record of the previous year when 165,000 yellow rubber ducks were used. Germany's biggest rubber duck race took place in Cologne in 2001 with 50,000 ducks floating on the Fühlinger See. The race in the area of Trier–Saarbrücken–Schweich received an award by the initiative "Deutschland – Land der Ideen" as one of 365 projects.

In 2008, at least 51 duck races took place in Germany. The races attracted up to 80,000 spectators. The ducks for the races are specially made with a very flat base and a small metal weight for stabilisation. The ducks are numbered and participants can select as many as they want. Since 2008, the organisers of the Great British Duck Race have used blue ducks instead of the traditional yellow ones because some people have brought their own rubber ducks and set them in the water near the finish line.

== By location ==
=== Australia ===
The Great Brisbane Duck Race is held on the Brisbane River each year to raise funds for the PA Research Foundation. The 100-metre (330 ft) race saw 30,000 rubber ducks enter the race in 2011. The PA Research Foundation also holds a Team Duck Race Challenge where groups are invited to raise funds and participate in either the motorised or non-motorised Team Duck Race with a large 26-centimetre (10 in) tall rubber duck that teams can decorate, brand, and modify.

One other race was conducted in Australia in January 1988. It was run from the "High-level bridge" to the "Low-level bridge" near Katherine, Northern Territory on the Australia Day long weekend. Acting on behalf of the town's Bicentennial Committee, Royal Australian Air Force officers Andrew Cairns and Jock MacGowan constructed the release cage from PVC pipe, purchased and numbered the ducks, printed tickets, and even arranged a helicopter flypast.

=== Europe ===
==== United Kingdom ====
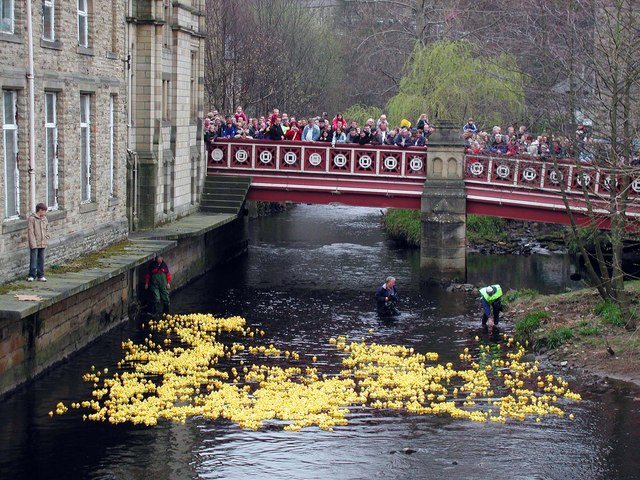
Hebden Bridge Duck Race, West Yorkshire

In Stockbridge, Edinburgh since 1988, the Stockbridge Community Festival has held the annual Stockbridge Duck Race to raise money for local charities. 1000 rubber ducks are released into the Water of Leith at the Stockbridge to float downstream to the finishing post at the Falshaw Bridge. The 2010 race was memorable for a sudden rain shower at the finish line. The 2011 race was held on 3 July with proceeds going to local charities Stockbridge House & St. Columba's Hospice.

For over 25 years, Bibury in Gloucestershire has hosted an annual Duck Race on Boxing Day. The charity event, which attracts thousands of spectators, is split into two races; one featuring the iconic yellow ducks, the other featuring the more realistic decoy ducks, both held on the River Coln.

On 31 August 2008, the Great British Duck Race was held near Hampton Court Palace in London. The race broke the world record for the number of ducks used together, with a total of 250,000. The ducks used in the race were a bright blue color, after stewards in the previous year faced problems from spectators throwing their own ducks into the water.

Each year, on Easter Monday, a duck race is organised in Glenridding by the local mountain rescue team to raise funds. Another is the Manchester Duck Race, held at Spinningfields on the River Irwell each Good Friday, with several thousand ducks.

Every year the West Sussex village of Westbourne holds a duck race down the River Ems as a part of the Westbourne Weekend charity event.

The “World Famous Deepings Lions Duck Race” is held on the first Sunday of September every year. 3000 plus yellow ducks swim down the River Welland to raise funds for nominated charities. The Deepings Lions Club have organised the race for over 44 years and have raised over £100,000 in that period.

==== Germany ====
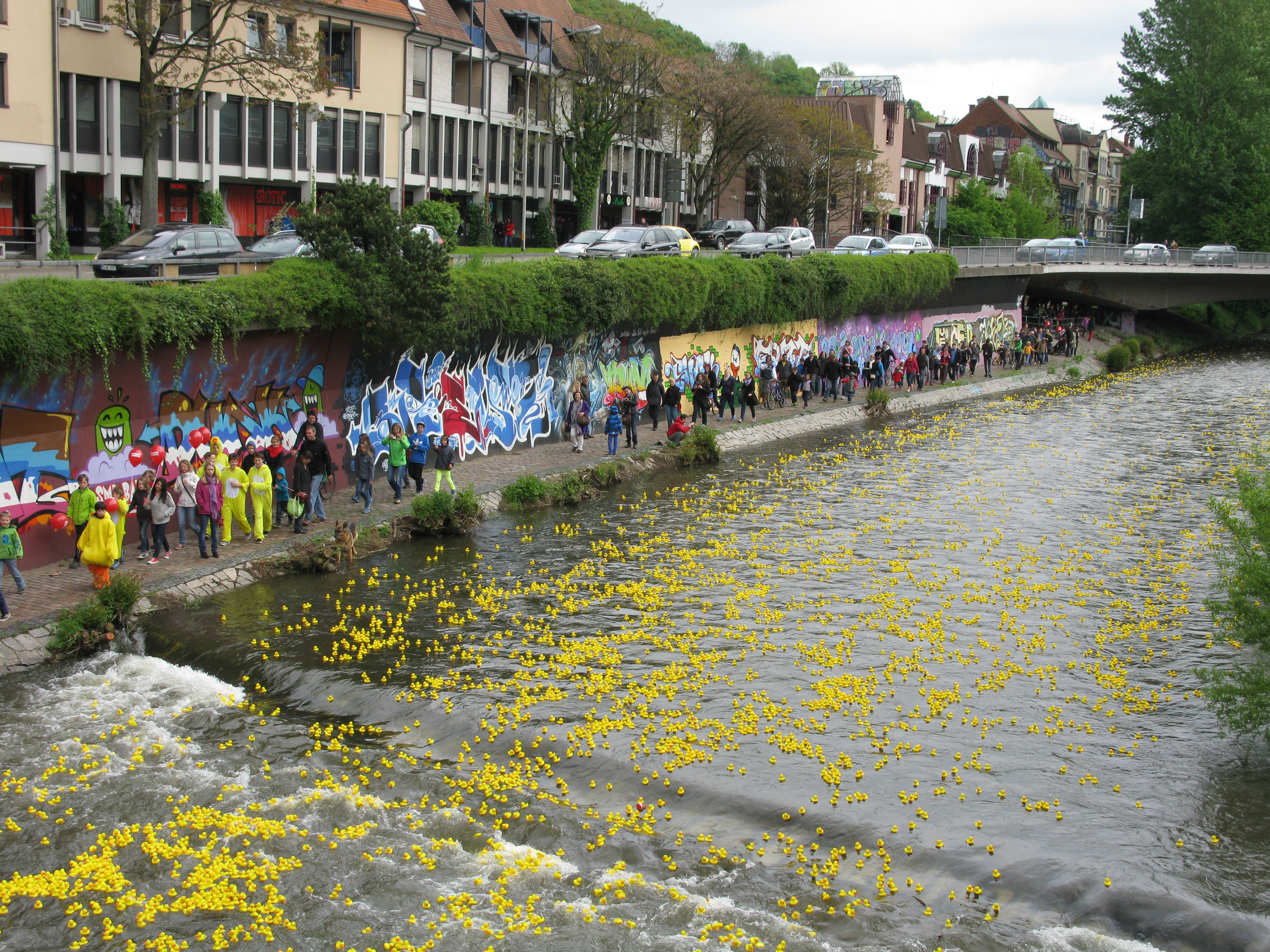
A rubber duck race in Freiburg, Germany

Every July a charity race called "Entencup" is held in Nuremberg. The beneficiary changes each time, among them the Nuremberg Zoo.

=== North America ===
There are hundreds of races held in the United States and internationally. The largest race in the United States is the annual Freestore Foodbank Rubber Duck Regatta in Cincinnati, Ohio. First run in 1995, this regatta now features over 150,000 ducks raced to raise money for the organization. Since its beginning in 1995, the Rubber Duck Regatta has raised over $9 million, with over $1 million raised each year race since 2014.

The annual Aspen Ducky Derby was first run by the Rotary Club of Aspen, Colorado, in 1991. The derby now features 30,000 ducks and takes place each August in Aspen's Rio Grande Park. Through its past 20 years, the Aspen Ducky Derby has raised more than $2.3 million to benefit 65 nonprofit groups.

In Fort Wayne, Indiana, for over 30 years the Weigand Construction Duck Race takes place in the summer at Johnny Appleseed Park to support the organization SCAN, whose mission is to eliminate the abuse and neglect of children in northeast Indiana through family services, education and community partnerships.

One of the more famous rubber duck races is the Great Knoxville Rubber Duck Race. This race received attention when the Tennessee Supreme Court ruled that it was a lottery, which stopped the race for a few years. After the state amended its constitution to allow lotteries with special exceptions, the race was reinstituted. The Derby Duck race sees over 40,000 ducks race to benefit the Boys and Girls Club of Tennessee Valley.

A famous rubber duck race is the Halifax Duck Derby. This race has 10,000 rubber ducks in the Halifax Harbour along Bishops Landing. There is a grand prize of CAD$1 million; other prizes include a trip to anywhere in Canada, large-screen TVs, and more. This race has been very successful in raising money and awareness for its organizations.

The Lumsden Duck Derby is a Labour Day tradition in the town of Lumsden, Saskatchewan, 31 kilometres (19 mi) northwest of Regina. Founded in 1988 to help the town raise funds for a new ice rink, nowadays the Derby races 25,000 rubber ducks down a stretch of the Qu'Appelle River and features a grand prize of CAD$1 million. The town makes a day out of it, with a pancake breakfast, bands and other entertainments, kids' activities, and a "parade to the post."

The Estes Park Rotary Duck Race raises money for sixty-eight different charities. Contestants must choose which charity to donate their money to when they buy their ticket.

== See also ==
- Teddy bear parachuting

== Literature ==
- Lotte Larsen Meyer: Rubber Ducks! Their Significance in Contemporary American Culture. In: The Journal of American Culture. Band 29, Issue 1, 2008, S. 14–23.
