= Lois Rosenthal =

American arts & humanities philanthropist, author, and publisher (1939 –2014)

- Born: May 18, 1939; Cincinnati, Ohio, U.S.
- Died: July 20, 2014 (aged 75)
- Education: Walnut Hills High School; University of Cincinnati (BA)
- Occupations: Author; publisher; philanthropist; community volunteer
- Spouse: Richard H. Rosenthal (m. 1959)

Lois Rosenthal (May 18, 1939 – July 20, 2014) was an American author, publisher, arts & humanities philanthropist, and community volunteer. She was based in Cincinnati, Ohio. She served on the boards of the Cincinnati Art Museum, Cincinnati Playhouse in the Park, Freestore Foodbank, Art Links, Cincinnati Museum Center, and the Mercantile Library of Cincinnati. Rosenthal was known for her hands-on philosophy of service in her community and was named Enquirer Woman of the Year in 1999 by The Cincinnati Enquirer.

== Early life and education ==
Lois Rosenthal was born May 18, 1939, in Cincinnati, Ohio and she grew up in largely Jewish neighborhood of South Avondale. Her family owned Bilker's, a successful family-owned neighborhood Kosher grocery and delicatessen in Cincinnati. She attended classes at Avondale School, is a graduate of Walnut Hills High School. She held a B.A. in Economics and Pre-Law (class of 1960) from the University of Cincinnati. At the age of 20, she married on December 20, 1959, to Richard H. Rosenthal.

Lois made her career working closely with her husband at their family-owned publishing business, F&W Publications, working there for over 40 years. Her husband ran the publishing end of specialty books and magazines, and she edited Story, a magazine focused on new fiction. The Rosenthals sold the business in December 1999 to concentrate on their charitable foundation.

== Early philanthropy ==
In 1988, Lois and Richard Rosenthal established the New Play Prize at the Cincinnati Playhouse in the Park.

In the 1970s, as a Planned Parenthood board member, she worked as a patient escort and guided young women through crowds of protesters.

She worked for the benefit of exotic animals and brought education programs to the Cincinnati Zoo and Botanical Garden.

Her work on behalf of California lettuce field workers led to a friendship with union leader Cesar Chavez.

== Rosenthal Family Foundation ==
She and her husband, Richard H. Rosenthal established the Rosenthal Family Foundation in 1986.

Lois launched the Rosey Reader Program in 1993, which distributes free books to inner-city schools. In 10 years of the Rosey Reader Program, more than 2 million books were read by students.

Through the foundation in 1999, they donated $6 million towards the $35.7M Contemporary Arts Center (CAC), built in downtown Cincinnati, which is one of the museums largest donations. The CAC building was designed by celebrated architect Zaha Hadid the center has become a mecca for emerging artists and patrons in the Midwest. In recognition for their contribution and deep involvement in its creation, the center was named The Lois and Richard Rosenthal CAC.

The Rosenthal Family Foundation made a $2.15 million grant in 2003 to the Cincinnati Art Museum to make admission to the Eden Park art museum permanently free to all.

The foundation also made a $300,000 gift to the National Underground Railroad Freedom Center to sponsor the Eternal Flame of Freedom at the center, which graces the Cincinnati riverfront.

Together with her husband, Lois co-founded the Lois and Richard Rosenthal Institute for Justice (RIJ) in 2004, based at the University of Cincinnati School of Law, to "harness the idealism, energy and intellect of law students, turning those qualities into a vehicle for positive social and legal change in Cincinnati, the state of Ohio, and beyond."

The couple also founded Uptown Arts, an Over-the-Rhine arts academy that offers free lessons to 300 inner-city children each year in such disciplines as art, music and dance. Uptown arts is housed in a restored three-story, 12,000-square-foot (1,100 m^{2}) Liberty Street building that also houses the Rosenthal Family Foundation.

With her husband, she co-founded the Rosenthal Next Generation Theater Series at the Cincinnati Playhouse in the Park which introduces children to plays.

Her work at the Cincinnati Freestore Foodbank enables distribution of fresh foods to the needy.

In their effort to fund emerging artists, she and her husband sponsored a ballet called Blue Until June that was choreographed to the music of Etta James.

== Awards ==
She was the National Magazine Award, 1992 and 1995 (finalist five times). In 1997, she was awarded the YWCA's Career Woman of Achievement. She was named Enquirer Woman of the Year in 1999 by The Cincinnati Enquirer.

In 2008, both Lois and her husband were awarded Honorary Doctor of Humane Letters from the University of Cincinnati, for their patronage and philanthropy for the city of Cincinnati.

== Death and legacy ==
She died on July 20, 2014, at the age of 75. A memorial was held for her in September 2014 at the Marx Theater at The Playhouse in the Park in Cincinnati. She was survived by her husband Richard, and their children Jennie Rosenthal Berliant and David Rosenthal and many grandchildren.
