= Rubber Duck (sculpture) =

Series of giant floating sculptures

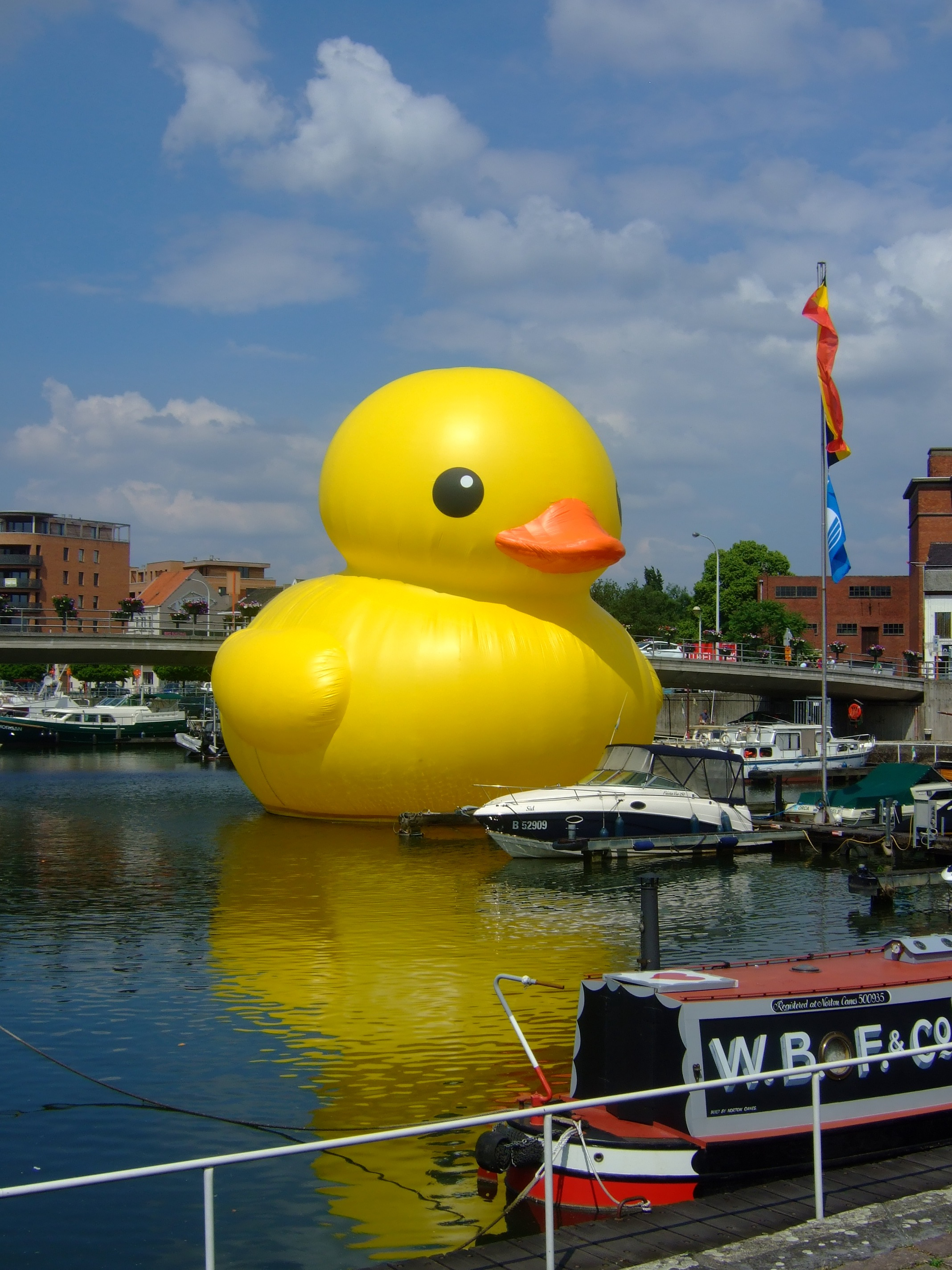
- 2007-version Rubber Duck in Belgium
- Artist: Florentijn Hofman
- Year: 2007
- Medium: Sculpture
- Location: Various

Rubber Duck is a series of several giant floating sculptures of yellow rubber ducks, designed by Dutch artist Florentijn Hofman, which have appeared in many cities around the world. Each Rubber Duck is recreated anew locally, as his public art is intended to be temporary.

== Artist ==
Rubber Duck was created by Dutch artist Florentijn Hofman. In a 2013 interview, Hofman stated that his initial inspiration came from a 2001 museum visit combined with a popular yoghurt advertisement in the Netherlands in 2000 or 2001. He searched to find what he considered the perfect toy duck and settled on a design by a Hong Kong company called Tolo Toys. The yoghurt company Yogho!Yogho! financed the work.

== Sculpture ==
=== Design ===
The size of the rubber duck varies. Hofman's largest rubber duck, in Saint-Nazaire, France, measured, width, length, height of 26 by 20 by 32 metres (85 ft × 66 ft × 105 ft). The rubber duck in Beijing was 14 by 15 by 18 metres (46 ft × 49 ft × 59 ft), and the rubber duck in Seokchon lake was 16.5 by 19.8 by 16.5 metres (54 ft × 65 ft × 54 ft) with a weight of 1,000 kilograms (2,200 lb). The rubber duck was constructed with more than 200 pieces of PVC. All the pieces of PVC are connected by hand with sewing machines.

In order to enhance the duck's durability, they added another piece on top of one layer. On the rubber duck, there is an opening at the back of the body so that architects and staff can perform a body check of the rubber duck. In addition, there is an electric propeller fan in its body so that it can be inflated at any time, in either good or bad weather. The loops that are in the pontoon edges of the rubber duck are connected to the fence of the lake by 16 ropes that are designed to hold the rubber duck still without it floating away by the waves of the lake water. On the bottom of the rubber duck, there is a waterproof cable that gets the energy from a power distribution board near the lake to make the electric propeller fan work. The electric propeller fan keeps the air circulating inside of the rubber duck, so that the air always keeps the shape of the rubber duck sculpture.

=== Display ===
Since 2007, the ducks have been on display in Amsterdam, Baku, Lommel (Belgium), Osaka, Sydney Harbour, São Paulo, and Hong Kong. It was on display in Pittsburgh as its first U.S. destination, from 27 September 2013 through 20 October 2013. Over 1,000,000 people are reported to have visited the duck in Pittsburgh. Its second United States appearance was in Norfolk, Virginia, from 17 to 26 May 2014, floating in The Hague Inlet in front of the Chrysler Museum of Art.

In October 2014, South Korea's Lotte group asked for the giant rubber duck to celebrate the opening of the new Lotte World Mall, the country's largest shopping mall that has a skyscraper, Lotte World Tower. The tower is located between the Han River and Seokchon Lake, where the giant rubber duck was placed. The duck deflated during the exhibition.

In 2009, while it was on display in Belgium, vandals stabbed Rubber Duck 42 times. While on display in Hong Kong in 2013, it deflated on 15 May. It was re-inflated and was again on exhibition on 20 May. It was damaged and deflated again in Taiwan on 2 November after an earthquake, before bursting at Keelung, Taiwan, on 31 December 2013. The duck was reported as having been swept away in recent floods in China. On 30 September 2017, during its exhibition in Santiago, the duck accidentally crashed into a sign, which tore a hole on its structure and caused it to deflate.

A "counterfeit" version of the duck went on tour around Canada in 2017 for Canada's sesquicentennial. The tour drew some controversy as it was seen by some as a waste of government spending; reports later found that the sculpture generated profits for the events it attended. This version was not approved by Studio Florentijn Hofman. On 9 June 2023, two Rubber Ducks were installed on Victoria Harbour, to be opened to the public on 10 June. The installation was titled Double Ducks, and was said to bring "double luck" to Hong Kong in a "time of turmoil". On the date of the opening, one duck was deflated due to high temperatures. It was reflated the day after. Although the installation was meant to be removed after two weeks (on 24 June), the installation was removed on 19 June.

== Censorship ==
On 4 June 2013, China's most popular microblogging website Sina Weibo blocked the term "Big Yellow Duck" to prevent users from posting pictures of the sculpture digitally altered in front of Tank Man, a heavily censored subject in the country. If the blocked term was searched, a message would say: "According to relevant laws, statutes and policies, [the results of the search] cannot be shown." Currently, there is no censorship of "Big Yellow Duck".

== List of locations ==
The Rubber Duck has made appearances in the following locations:

- Auckland, New Zealand, February 2011 (12×14×16 metres or 39×46×52 feet)
- Baku, Azerbaijan, September 2013 (12×14×16 metres or 39×46×52 feet)
- Beijing, China, September 2013 (14×15×18 metres or 46×49×59 feet)
- Brisbane, Queensland, Australia, 21 October - 8 November 2026 (13×14×15 metres or 43×46×49 feet)
- Buffalo, New York, United States, 26 August 2016
- Hangzhou, Zhejiang, China, 30 May – 15 July 2014 (25×18×18 metres or 82×59×59 feet)
- Harbin, Heilongjiang, China, July – August 2016
- Hasselt, Belgium, July 2012 (12×14×16 metres or 39×46×52 feet)
- Ho Chi Minh City, Vietnam, 27 April – 31 May 2014 (22×20×16 metres or 72×66×52 feet)
- Kaohsiung, Taiwan (ROC), 27 January 2024 – 25 February 2024 (“Double Ducks”, each measuring 18 metres in height)
- Kaohsiung, Taiwan (ROC), September 2013 (25×18×18 metres or 82×59×59 feet)
- Keelung, Taiwan (ROC), 20 December 2013 (25×18×18 metres or 82×59×59 feet)
- London, United Kingdom, September 2014
- Los Angeles, California, United States, August 2014 (33×18×26 metres or 108×59×85 feet)
- Macau, Macau (SAR China), 29 April 2016 – 27 May 2016
- Norfolk, Virginia, United States, 17 – 26 May 2014 (14×15×16.5 metres or 46×49×54 feet)
- Onomichi, Japan, 2012 (10×11×13 metres or 33×36×43 feet)
- Osaka, Japan, December 2010 (10×11×13 metres or 33×36×43 feet)
- Parramatta, Australia, 10 – 19 January 2014 (13×14×15 metres or 43×46×49 feet)
- Pittsburgh, Pennsylvania, United States, September 2013 (14×15×16.5 metres or 46×49×54 feet)
- Rotterdam, Netherlands 2005
- Saint-Nazaire, France, 2007 (26×20×32 metres or 85×66×105 feet)
- Santiago and Valparaíso, Chile, 28 September 2017 – 8 October 2017
- São Paulo, Brazil, 2008 (12×14×16 metres or 39×46×52 feet)
- Seoul, South Korea, 14 October 2014 – 14 November 2014 (16.5×19.8×16.5 metres or 54×65×54 feet)
- Seoul, South Korea, 30 September 2022 – 31 October 2022
- Shanghai, China, 23 October 2014 – 23 November 2014
- Sydney, New South Wales, Australia, January 2013 (13×14×15 metres or 43×46×49 feet)
- Tamar, Hong Kong, 10 June 2023 – 18 June 2023 (“Double Ducks”, each measuring 18 metres in height)
- Taoyuan, Taiwan (ROC), 26 October 2013 (25×18×18 metres or 82×59×59 feet)
- Tsim Sha Tsui, Kowloon, Hong Kong, May 2013 (14×15×16.5 metres or 46×49×54 feet)

== See also ==
- Friendly Floatees
- World's Largest Rubber Duck
- Ego Leonard
