= Tomas Mazetti =

Swedish activist and inventor

Tomas Mazetti (born 1972), is a Swedish activist and inventor. He is the founder of the former creative agency Studio Total as well as the invention lab Nordic Society for Invention and Discovery and Wheelys Café. He is, among other things, known for the Teddybear Airdrop Minsk 2012 where he flew over Belarus airspace, parachuting teddy bears with democratic messages.

John Oliver featured the action as one section on Last Week Tonight with John Oliver on the situation in Belarus.
