= Per Cromwell =

Swedish businessman

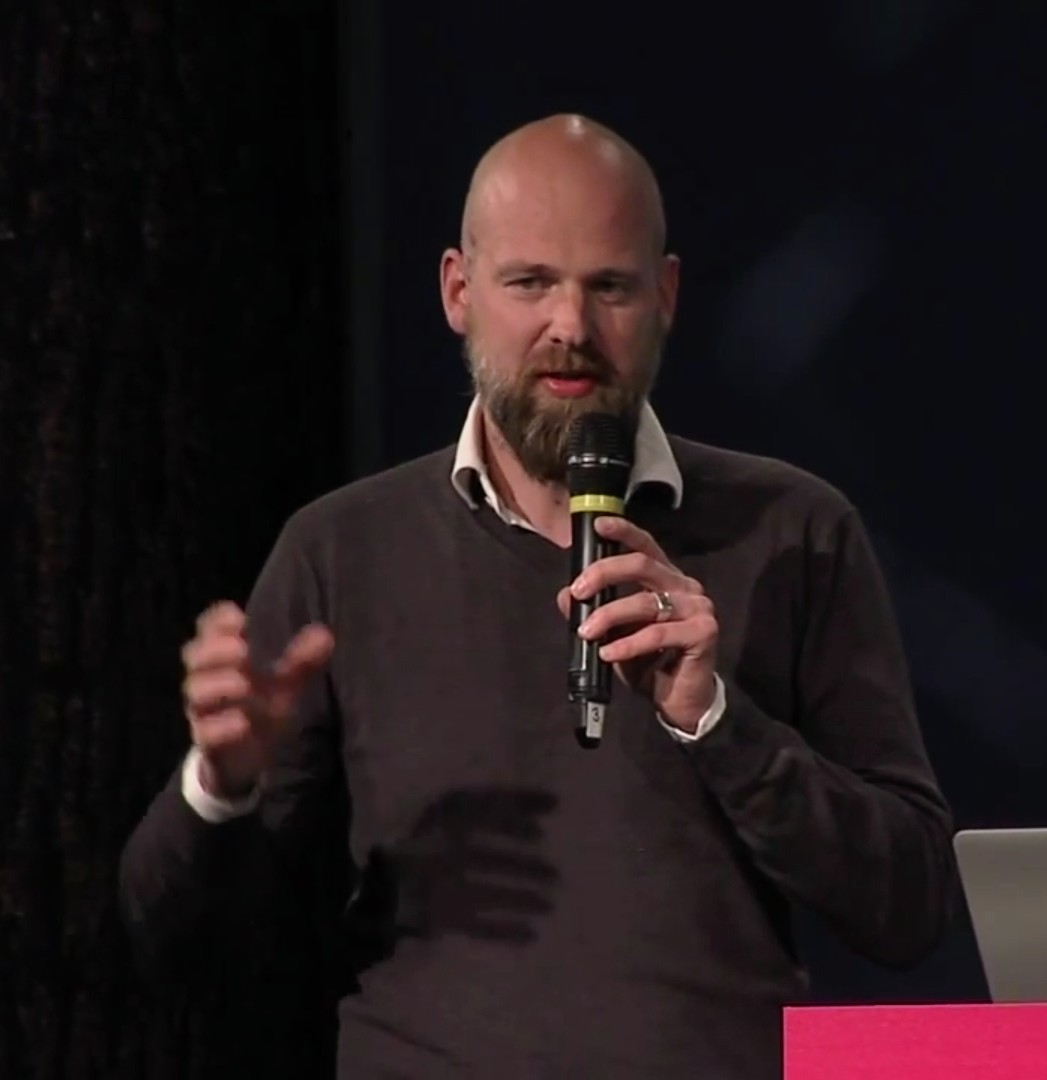
Per Cromwell, 2014

Per Cromwell (born 13 September 1974, in Malmö, Sweden), is a Swedish ad-man, activist and inventor. He is the co-founder of the creative agency Studio Total. Today he is managing the Swedish-Finnish company Nordic Society for Invention and Discovery.

He has figured in international media and are, among others, known for creating the experimental lab MiCasa, the dog to human translator No More Woof as well as creating the world's biggest iPhone speakers - WOS (wall of sound) 1.0 and 2.0. Per Cromwell is one of the persons behind the Teddybear stunt in Belarus during the summer of 2012, for which he won a Gold Epica for world's best PR.
