= Seokchon Lake Park =

Park in Seoul, South Korea

Coordinates: 37.510°N 127.103°E

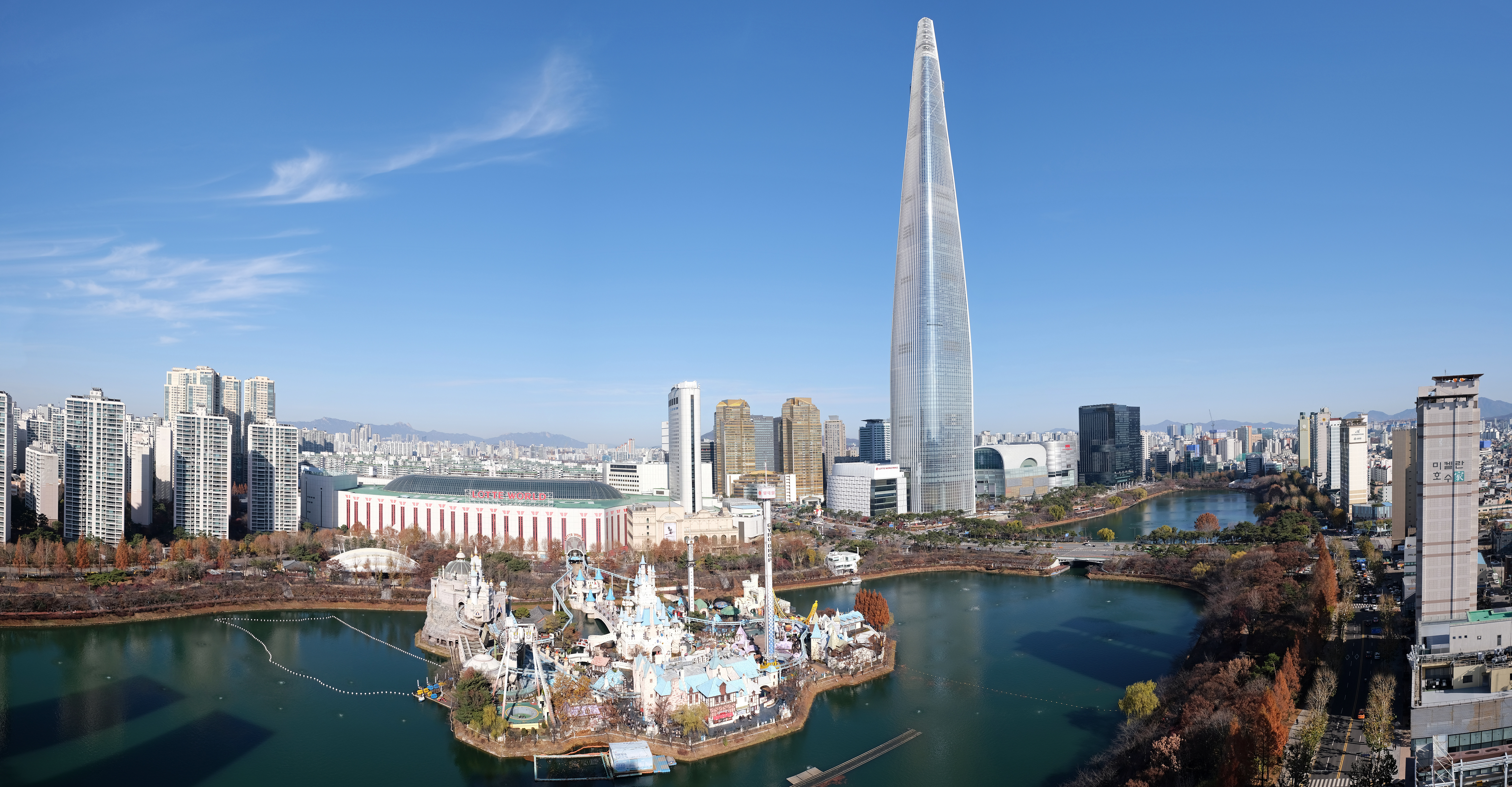
- Seokchon Lake
- Interactive map of Seokchon Lake Park
- Type: Park
- Location: Songpa District, Seoul, South Korea
- Opened: November 26, 1981

Korean name
- Hangul: 석촌호수공원
- Hanja: 石村湖水公園
- RR: Seokchon hosu gongwon
- MR: Sŏkch'on hosu kongwŏn

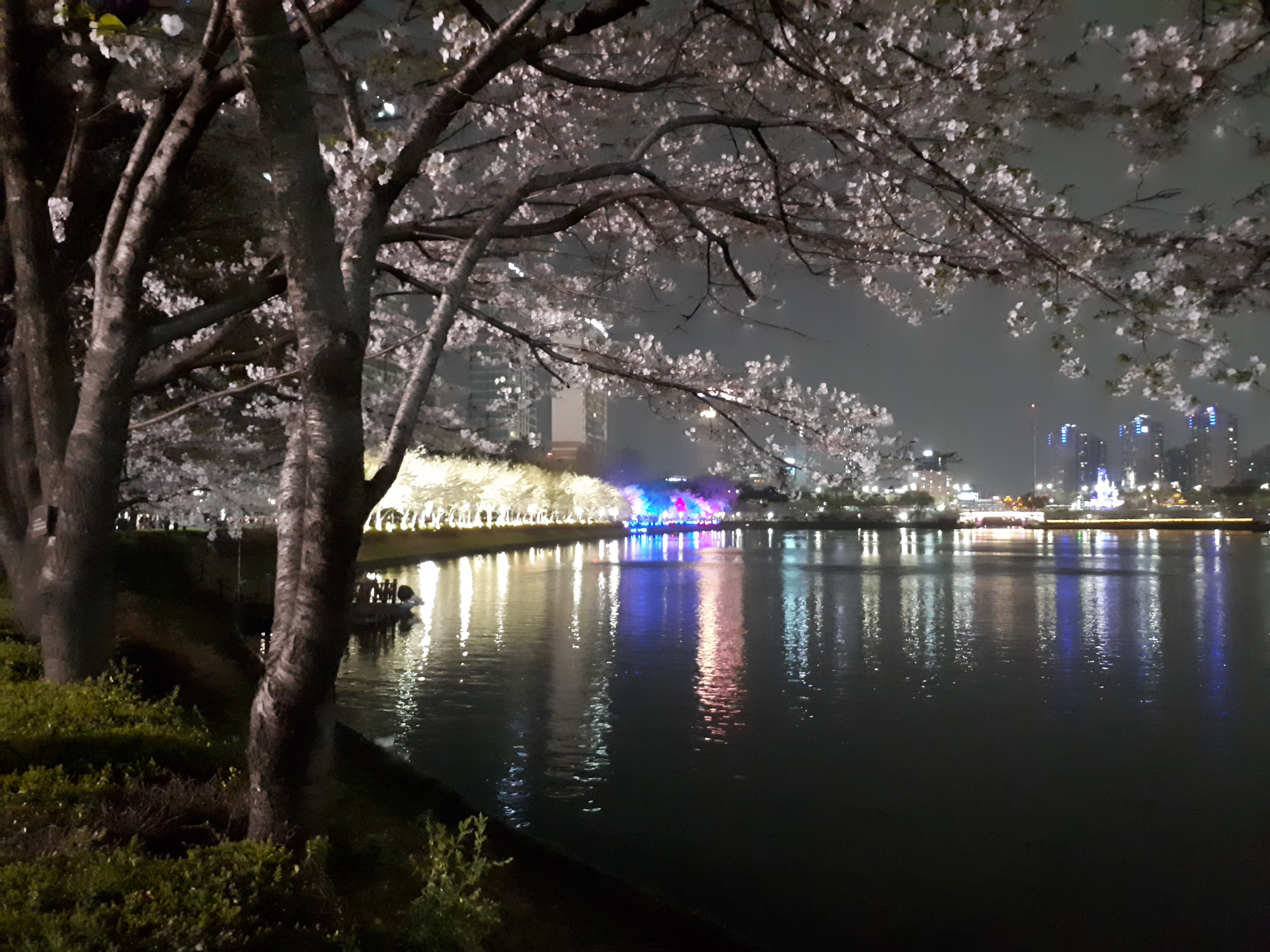
East part of the lake

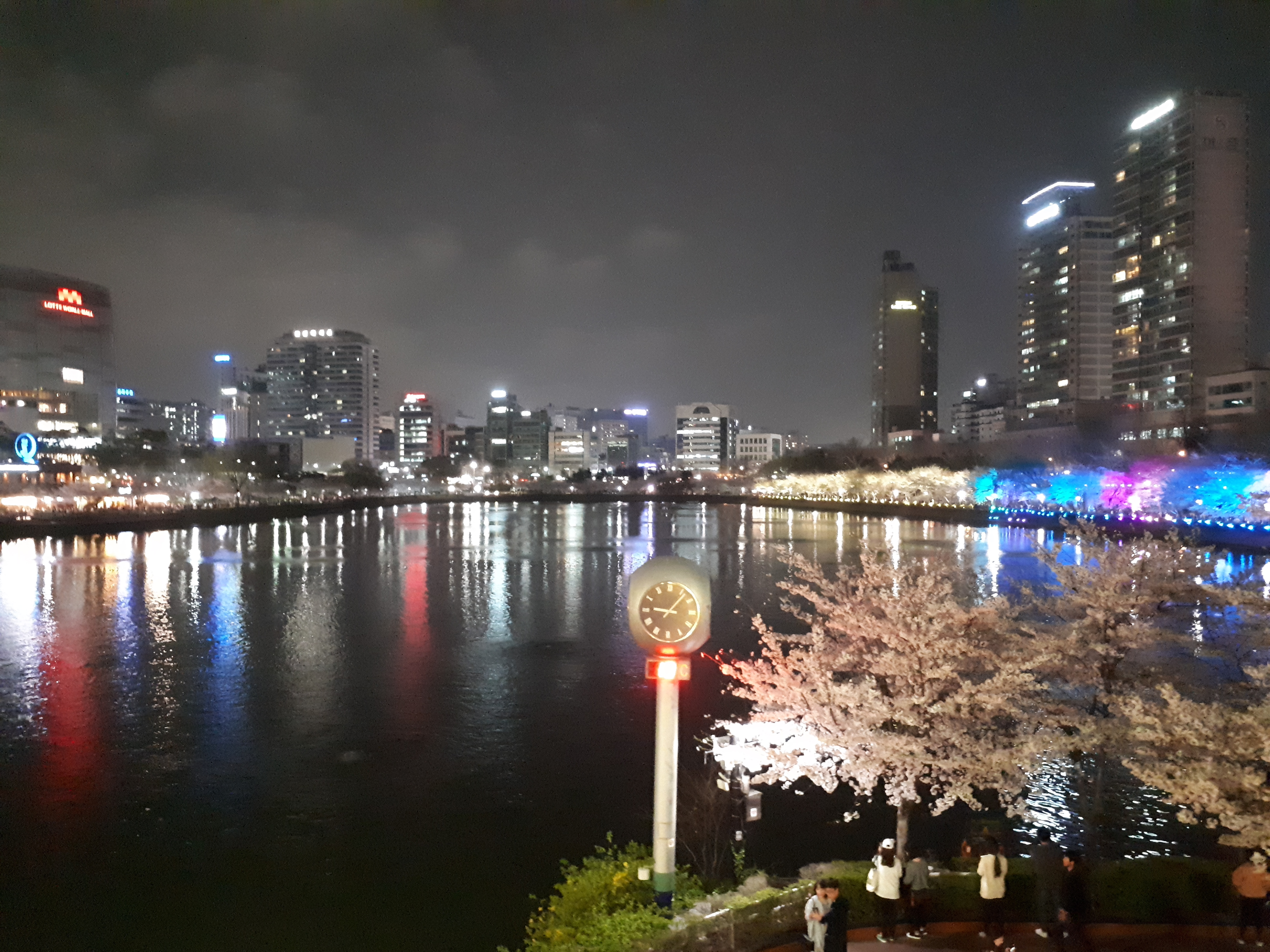
Cherry blossom

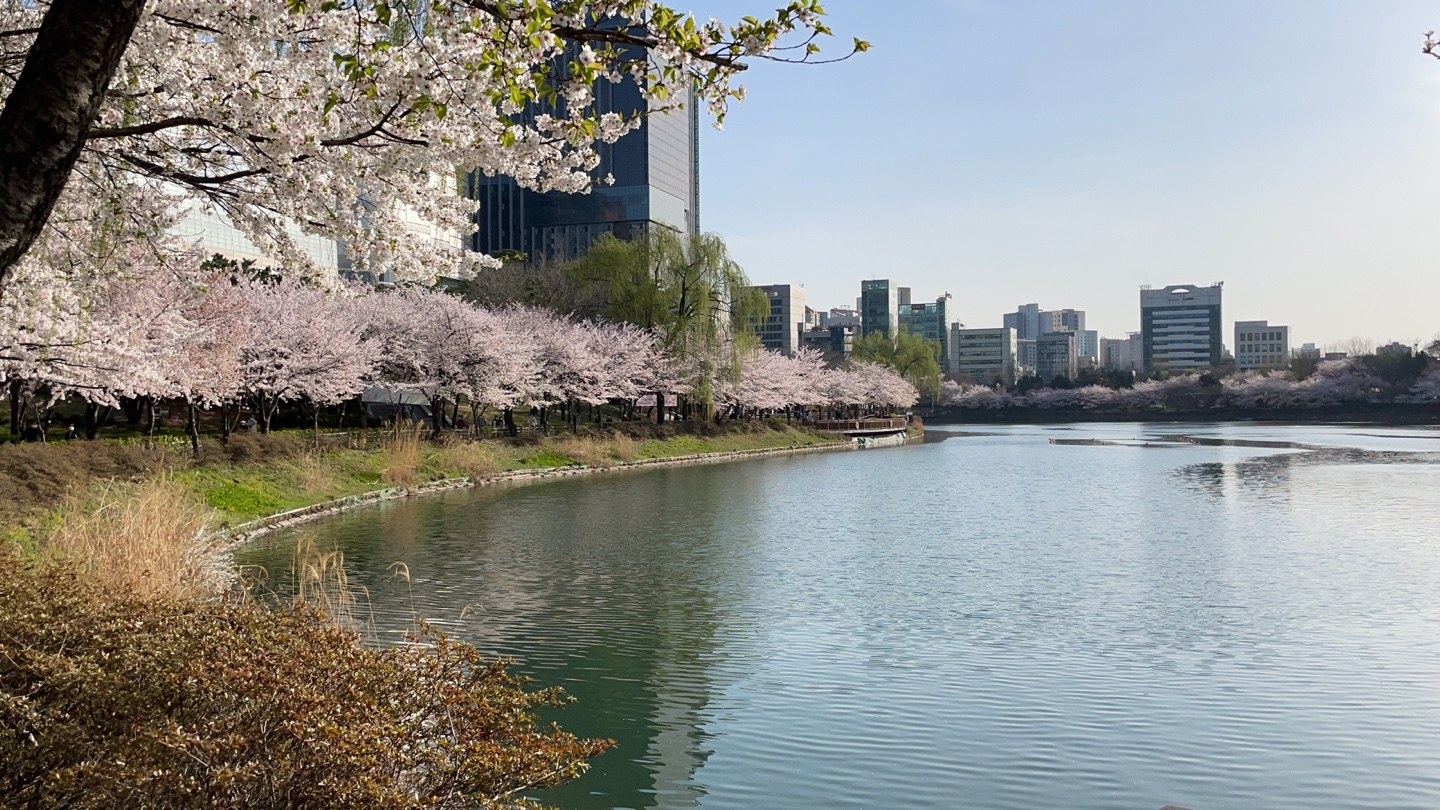
Seokchon Lake with Cherry Blossoms in 2021

Seokchon Lake Park (Korean: 석촌호수공원) in Songpa District, Seoul, South Korea includes Seokchon Lake and Lotte World's Magic Island. The lake's area is 217,850 m^{2} (2,344,900 sq ft) and its average depth is about 4.5 meters (15 ft).

== History ==
Seokchon Lake was originally a part of the Han River. There was an island named Burido in the middle of the Han River dividing it into two, Songpa River (the northern part) and Sincheon River (the southern part). In April 1971, a construction project to connect Burido with the mainland began. It proceeded by enlarging the Songpa River and closing the Sincheon River. Due to this construction, the enclosed southern part of the Han River became Seokchon Lake, and the land made by the reclamation project became Jamsil-dong and Sincheon-dong.

In the 1970s, following construction, Seokchon Lake and the surrounding area was unsightly. A walking trail was made and trees planted, transforming the area into a park. Later, Seokchon Lake became polluted causing a foul smell. People avoided Seokchon Lake Park due to this. In 2001, Songpagu designated it a tourist attraction and began a maintenance project clearing the water and enabling the ecological system to recover.

== East Lake ==
The East Lake has a trail which is connected to West Lake under the Jamsilhosugyo (Jamsil Lake Bridge). Beside the trail, there are some facilities including some rest area and public restrooms. At the north side, there is a two-floor building which has the Songpa Travel Information Center on the second floor. In October 2014, the Rubber Duck was held on the East Lake by Lotte Group to celebrate the opening of the new Lotte World Mall. Also, the Super Moon Project was held in September 2016, an art project planned by the art collaborative group FriendsWithYou. The Super Moon is a 60-foot inflatable sculpture surrounded by a garden of eight symbolic planets of color and light.

In addition, as part of the "Pokémon Town 2024 with Lotte" project, a giant Lapras inflatable was displayed on Seokchon Lake from April 26 to May 19, 2024. Alongside this installation, various events and merchandise sales were also held.

The event was also held in 2025, during which an balloon doll of Lapras from Pokémon was displayed on the East Lake of Seokchon Lake. However, unlike the previous year, the concept centered around Ditto, another Pokémon character. As a result, the Lapras inflatable featured a face resembling Ditto’s, and various Ditto-themed sculptures were installed throughout Seokchon Lake Park.

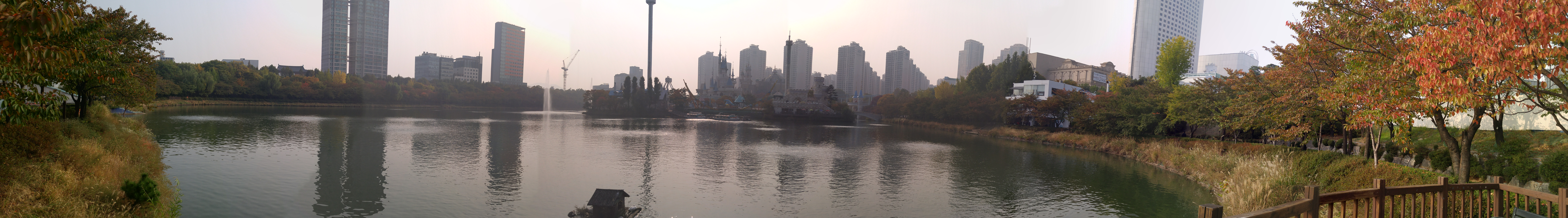
Panorama of the lake

== West Lake ==
The West Lake is 112,065 m^{2} large and is slightly larger than the East Lake. Around the West Lake, there are Seoul Playground and Lotte World's Magic Island.

=== Seoul play ground ===
Seoul play ground (서울놀이마당; Seoul Norimadang) is an outdoor stage located inside Seokchon Lake Park where different kinds of folk arts are performed. It was built in 1984 for the presentation and preservation of Korean traditional folk art. The whole facility is 8,250 m^{2} large, and seats are 825 m^{2} large having seating capacity of 1,500. The building is a traditional style tile-roofed house, which has hip-and-gable roof and entasis columns.

Annually from April to October, Intangible Cultural Property and fusion folk art performance are held every weekend. Also, special performances are perform in traditional holidays of Korea (Seollal, Daeboreum, Chuseok). Songpa Sandae Noli, sheaf burning are some of the major performances held in the place.

== Festivals ==
Seokchon Lake has many various festivals, including the Cherry Blossom Festival, Deciduous Street Festival, and the Seokchon Lake Concert. These festivals show many attractive parts of the Seokchon Lake.

=== Cherry Blossom Festival ===
The Seokchon Lake Cherry Blossom Festival is one of the most representative spring festivals in Seoul. The festival has many events such as shows performed by popular singers and amateur performance team. During the festival season, the Lotte World Tower at Seokchon Lake and the Magic Island combine with cherry blossoms, making a beautiful landscape. The 2021 Seokchon Lake Cherry Blossom Festival was held online due to Corona 19.

=== Deciduous Street Festival ===
In fall, Seokchon Lake Deciduous Street Festival begin, and Seokchon Lake is filled with thousands of deciduous leaves such as platanus, King cherry trees, ginkgo trees and maple trees. On the lake, you can see colorful Lanterns, and there is a night scenery view photo zone.

=== Seokchon Lake Music Concert ===
The Seokchon Lake Music Concert is held at East Side Central Waterfront Stage every Friday, Saturday and Sunday from mid-April to November. There are performances of various genres such as singing, dancing, pop, musical instrument.

== Seokchon Lake Café Street ==
The cafe street is located next to the East Lake, about 1.1 km. There are about 12 cafes in the café street. There is one at approximately every 100 meters. There are various cafes in the vicinity of Seokchon Lake, which have unique names and different atmospheres. There are coffee shops, bakeries, and places you can eat fusion dishes. Also, since outdoor business is allowed in this area, one can eat outside looking at the scenery of the Seokchon Lake.

== Controversy ==
From 2010 to 2013, the average water level of Seokchon lake was lowered from 4.63 meters to 4.17 meters. About 4 million tons of water was leaked from Seokchon Lake. Also, several large underground voids and sinkholes were observed near the lake and caused controversy about safety problems. According to an investigation by the City of Seoul, it was caused by massive underground operation from the construction of Lotte World Tower and Seoul Subway Line 9. In 2013, the City of Seoul started supplying water to maintain the lake's water level. As of 2015, the lake had an average water level of 4.8 meters.
