= Teddy bear parachuting =

Dropping teddy bears from height with a parachute

Teddy bear parachuting, sometimes referred to as parafauna, is a game in which teddy bears equipped with parachutes are dropped from a height. It is increasing in popularity as a charity fundraiser, and competitions based on the descent time are also common.

A typical teddy bear parachute may be made from an old umbrella canopy or other lightweight material. A simple hemispherical pattern of multiple tapered gores may be sewn from ripstop nylon kite or sail fabric. Many bears are dressed and fully equipped with parachute packs, helmets and goggles.

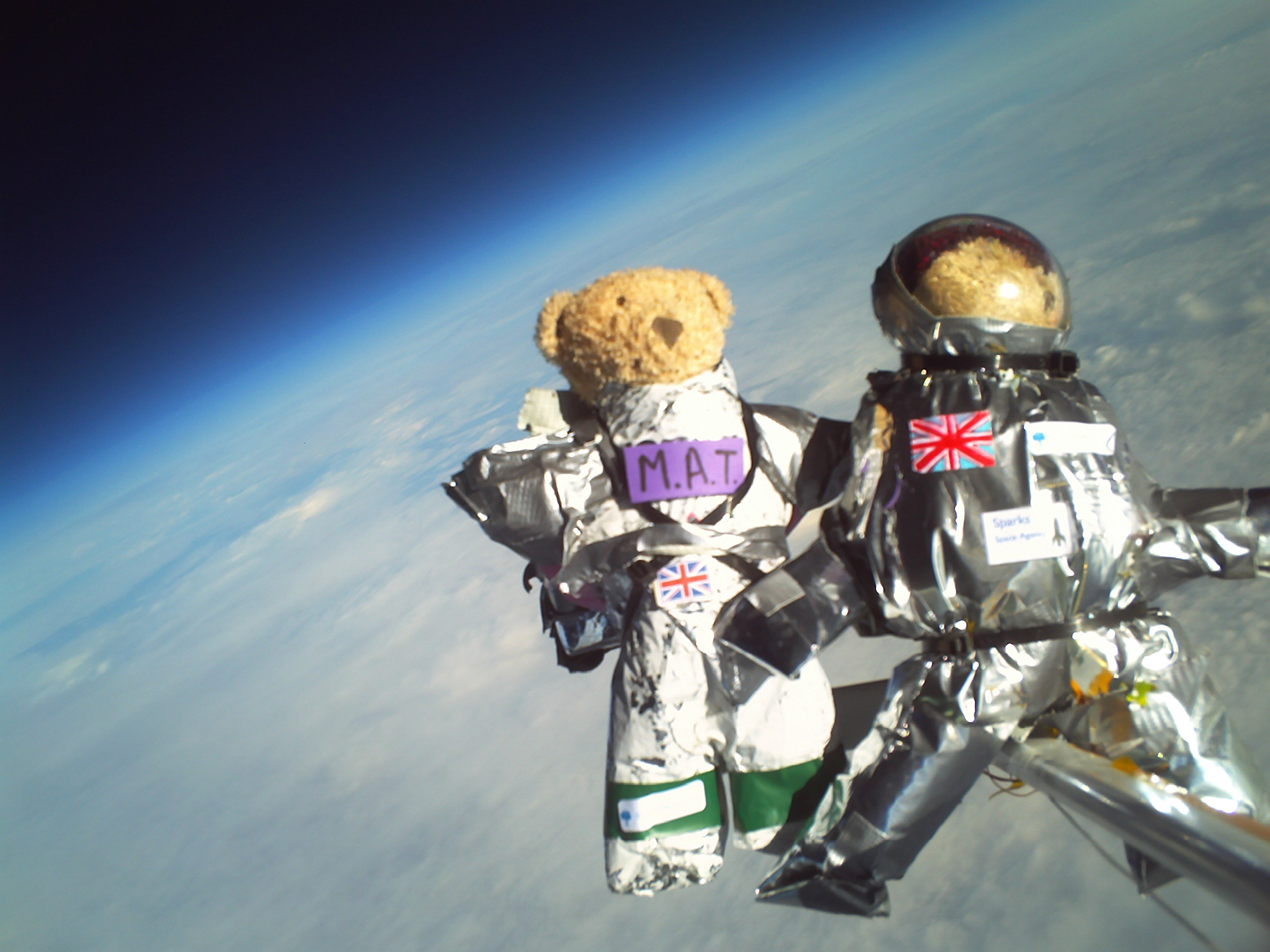
These teddies landed by parachute after a balloon ride that took them to an altitude of 30km

While jumps are commonly from high buildings such as church towers and castles, some are more ambitious, with at least one regular event including parachuting from a light aircraft.

The first bears to do a jump from a light aircraft are still around, and go under the name of the "Ted Devils". A unique item that takes place at airshows (including those at fêtes and private functions) devised and run by a well known UK display pilot and aircraft. Additionally, these bears are fund raisers that support the local community, by letting the local community take part in the event before the day.

Parachuting bears are also lifted by kite and released with a dropper mechanism. This method is cheap and highly portable. Kites such as parafoils or large deltas are particularly suitable for this. As many kite fliers also make their own kites, the parachutes are usually self-manufactured too. Most bears must be lifted aloft along with the kite. Some small bears may be transported along the line of an already flying kite by a messenger, a small carriage with sails. When the messenger reaches the top of the kite line, the bear is released automatically. This is a much simpler method for repeated drops or charity events.

The parachuting of teddy bears was used as a political statement when several hundred of the stuffed toys bearing protest slogans were dropped over the Belarus city of Minsk on 4 July 2012.

== See also ==
- Rocky (bear)
- Rubber duck race
