= Studio Total =

Swedish marketing and advertising agency

- Industry: Marketing; Advertising
- Headquarters: Stockholm and Malmö, Sweden
- Website: studiototal.se

Studio Total was a Swedish marketing and advertising agency in Stockholm and Malmö. They focused primarily on creative PR, such as guerrilla marketing, and have attracted much attention for several campaigns, both locally and globally. Their first assignment was for the National Swedish Touring Theatre, for which the fictional political party "Kulturpartiet" became one of the most successful Swedish PR-campaigns in 2005. On the political theme, Studio Total also stirred up controversy in 2010, when Swedish feminist Gudrun Schyman burned 100,000 kronor (approximately $14,000) in a protest against unequal pay. In 2012 Studio Total won a gold epica for worlds best PR.

One of their most noticed campaigns globally is Wall of Sound, the world's biggest iPod speaker for Swedish clothing firm Brothers. In 2010, it won a nomination for "music gadget of the year" at the T3 gadget awards in London.

== Teddybear Airdrop Minsk 2012 ==
On 4 July 2012, Studio Total arranged an airdrop of teddy bears endorsing freedom of speech over Belarus. The group called the mission "Teddybear Airdrop Minsk 2012". A plane piloted by Tomas Mazetti and Hannah Lina Frey took off from Pociunai, near Kaunas, Lithuania, and illegally entered Belarusian airspace, proceeding over the town of Ivyanets. The group then released 1,000 teddy bears holding cards and banners with protest slogans. The second airdrop was made over a southwest suburb of Minsk. When the Belarusian government denied that the incident had taken place, Studio Total released 90 minutes of footage of the flight, which Radio Free Europe reported that they had confirmed with experts had not been doctored.

Following the drop, photojournalist Anton Suryapin posted photographs on his website that he said had been e-mailed to him by an Ivyanets resident. On 13 July, his home was searched, his computer confiscated, and he was detained as an accomplice. On 19 July, Studio Total founder Per Cromwell published an open letter in which he stated that the group "never told Anton Suryapin or indeed any other Belarus citizen in advance about what we planned to do. We love (respect) and admire them too much to expose them to such risks." The letter also called Belarusian president Alexander Lukashenko an "armed clown".

On 24 July, Suryapin still had been not been released from prison, leading BBC News and other sources to conclude that charges had been filed against him, as Belarusian law only allows ten days of detention without charge. Amnesty International described the arrest as "a further nail in the coffin of freedom of expression and association in Belarus", and named Suryapin a prisoner of conscience. Suryapin was charged and released on bail on August 17, 2012, on condition that he could not leave his home city of Slutsk, south of Minsk, without government permission. These bail conditions were lifted on June 28, 2013, when Belarus' State Security Committee publicly announced that the criminal case was closed.

John Oliver featured the action as one section on Last Week Tonight with John Oliver on the situation in Belarus.
