= Anton Suryapin =

Belarusian journalist

- Born: 28 February 1992 (age 34)
- Occupation: photojournalist
- Known for: 2012 arrest

Anton Andreyevich Suryapin (Belarusian: Антон Андрэевіч Сурапін; born 28 February 1992) is a Belarusian photojournalist. On 13 July 2012, he was detained after publishing pictures of a protest by a Swedish advertising company in which teddy bears were airdropped into the country with slogans advertising freedom of speech.

== Detention ==
The teddy bears were dropped on 4 July 2012 by Studio Total, a Swedish advertising firm. The group called the mission "Teddybear Airdrop Minsk 2012". A plane piloted by Tomas Mazetti took off from a town near Kaunas, Lithuania, and illegally entered Belarusian airspace, proceeding over the town of Ivyanets. The group then released 1,000 teddy bears holding cards and banners with protest slogans. When the Belarusian government denied that the incident had taken place, Studio Total released 90 minutes of footage of the flight, which Radio Free Europe reported that they had confirmed with experts had not been doctored. On 26 July, Belarusian president Alexander Lukashenko acknowledged the drop had occurred as reported.

Following the drop, Suryapin posted photographs on his website that he said had been e-mailed to him by an Ivyanets resident. On 13 July, his home was searched, his computer confiscated, and he was detained as an accomplice. On 19 July, Studio Total founder Per Cromwell published an open letter in which he stated that the group "never told Anton Suryapin or indeed any other Belarus citizen in advance about what we planned to do. We love (respect) and admire them too much to expose them to such risks." The letter also called Lukashenko an "armed clown".

On 24 July, Suryapin still had been not been released from prison, leading BBC News and other sources to conclude that charges had been filed against him, as Belarusian law only allows ten days of detention without charge. Amnesty International described the arrest as "a further nail in the coffin of freedom of expression and association in Belarus", and named Suryapin a prisoner of conscience. Index on Censorship described the case against Suryapin as "ludicrous", stating, "Not for the first time, the authorities in Belarus have found someone to blame for something they say hasn’t happened." The Committee to Protect Journalists called the charges "senseless" and called for Suryapin's immediate release.

On 28 June 2013, Belarus' State Security Committee publicly announced that the criminal case was closed, and the charges against Suryapin and real estate agent Syarhei Basharimau (who had rented an apartment in the capital to two Swedes connected with Studio Total) were dropped. Bail conditions were lifted and they were allowed to leave the country if they wished.
