= Nordic Society for Invention and Discovery =

Nordic Society for Invention and Discovery is a Scandinavian invention lab, founded in 2013 by Per Cromwell and Tomas Mazetti.

== Notable work ==
=== No More Woof ===
No More Woof is a device to translate dogs' thoughts into human language using electroencephalography sensors.

=== The Aalto Puck ===
The Aalto puck is an experimental hockey puck inspired by the forms of the Finnish architect Alvar Aalto to research what happens if the hockey puck isn't round. It is designed with the goal to maximize randomness and has been tested by hockey teams as Swedish Hammarby IF.

=== Flying Carpets for Pets ===
Flying carpets for pets is a small prototype that can lift small animals (2.4 kilograms (5.3 lb)) up to 7 centimetres (2.8 in) above the ground. The levitation is provided by six pairs of neodymium magnets.
