= Rocky (bear) =

US army black bear mascot (born 1953)

Rocky being fed an apple at the Lincoln Park Zoo, 1954

Rocky (b. 1953) was a parachuting Asian black bear. She was purchased from a Kumamoto zoo to serve as a mascot for the U.S. 187th Airborne Regimental Combat Team during the Korean War. She completed five parachute jumps, earning her parachutist badge. After sustaining injuries during an artillery attack, she was awarded a Purple Heart. After she was discharged, Rocky was shipped to the United States where she was a guest on the television program Zoo Parade. She lived out the remainder of her life at the Lincoln Park Zoo in Chicago.

== Early life and paratrooping ==
Rocky was born on 1 April 1953 in Hokkaido. She lived briefly at a zoo in Kumamoto, Japan. Members of the U.S. 187th Airborne Regimental Combat Team's AAA Battery were stationed in Kumamoto during the Korean War. They decided they needed a mascot for the regiment and purchased the 4-pound (1.8 kg) cub from the zoo for ¥40,000 (approximately $111). She was originally named Rakkasan, or "Rocky-San", which was a nickname for the regiment and the Japanese word for parachute (Japanese: 落下傘).

Rocky served as the mascot for the battalion and was taken along on parachute jumps. She was "encouraged" to jump five times, including one assisted jump, meeting the qualifications for designation as a paratrooper and earning her parachutist badge. Rocky had a special parachute harness, but was a reluctant paratrooper. For her first jump, just two months after leaving the zoo, she was placed in the kit bag of Gene Castle. On her next jump, out of a C-119, she bit three soldiers before the jumpmaster eventually pushed her out. On her fourth jump, she chewed the toe off of the boot of a paratrooper who was forcing her out of the plane.

The 187th was stationed in Korea for four months in the summer of 1953. Rocky was outside of the mess hall when the AAA Battery came under artillery fire, Rocky was hit underneath the chin by shell fragments. She received a Purple Heart. She also received a Korean Service Medal. Despite her accolades, she bit several soldiers, shredded chairs, stole food, and uprooted trees. According to a 1954 article in Stars And Stripes, she was "destined to be a permanent Pvt. E-2" due to her "somewhat unsoldierly" conduct, including biting Castle, going AWOL, and missing a bed check.

== Lincoln Park Zoo ==
As Rocky grew, she became difficult for the soldiers to handle. A collection of $500 was raised to pay for her to be sent to a zoo in the United States. Master sergeant Gene Castle, a paratrooper from Paintsville, Kentucky, raised Rocky from the time she was a cub. He elected to donate her to the Lincoln Park Zoo in Chicago because many of the soldiers who served in the battalion were from the Midwest. Rocky was discharged and travelled on the Japanese transport ship Arimasan Maru to the Oakland Army Terminal, where she nipped at a dockworker. Castle met her there and then drove her in a trailer to Chicago. They both appeared on the television program Zoo Parade.

Rocky was transferred to the Lincoln Park Zoo in October 1954, while Marlin Perkins was serving as the zoo director. Then about 16 months old and weighing 120 pounds (54 kg), she was the subject of a newspaper article which announced that "Rocky, the world's youngest lady paratrooper, was locked up Saturday in Lincoln Park Zoo—and there she'll stay."

In 1962, Rocky was paired with a male bear from the Ueno Zoo in Tokyo.

== See also ==
- List of individual bears
- Teddy bear parachuting
