= Cincinnati Riverfest =

Annual festival in Cincinnati, Ohio, US

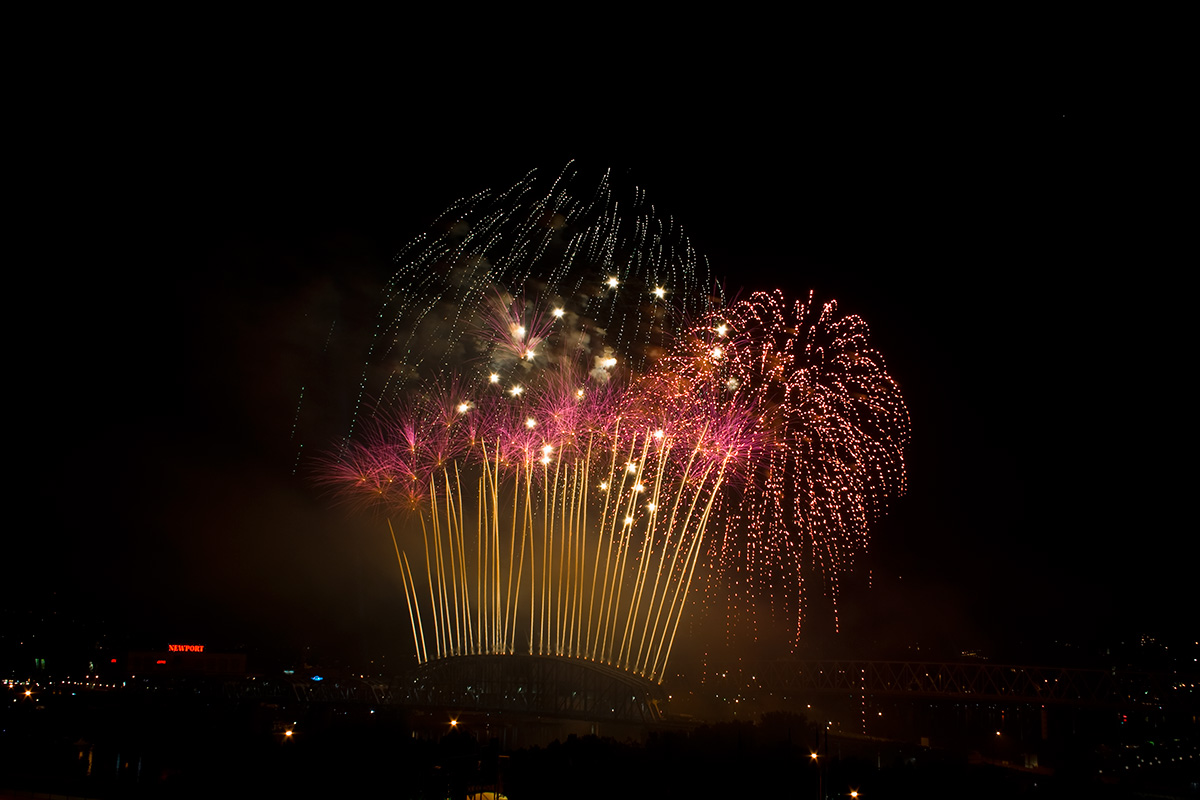
Riverfest fireworks display in 2007

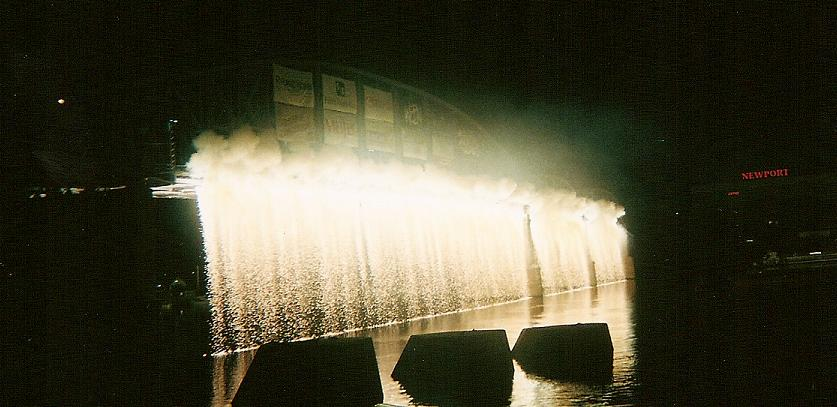
Riverfest's famous 'waterfall' firework display off of the Newport Southbank Bridge

The Cincinnati Riverfest (officially the Western & Southern/WEBN Fireworks) is an annual festival that takes place on Labor Day weekend on the Ohio River at Cincinnati. It has taken place annually since 1977. The highlight of the event, the fireworks display at 9:05PM ET, is one of the largest in the Midwest. The festival's corporate sponsors are WEBN (102.7 FM) and Western & Southern Financial Group.

== History ==
The fireworks display was first organized in 1977 by the late and great Frank Wood Jr. A.K.A. Dr. Michael Bo Xanadu as a gift for the listeners to celebrate the 10th anniversary of Cincinnati's 1st ever FM rockradio station WEBN. It has now evolved into an all-day event is held every year on the day before Labor Day. Cincinnati Bell sponsored Riverfest from 2007 to 2014, when it was known as the Cincinnati Bell/WEBN Riverfest. Prior to that, Toyota was the major sponsor for the event (1987–2006), when it was known as the Toyota/WEBN Fireworks.

But in 2020 due to the ongoing Coronavirus Pandemic, Riverfest was cancelled. However the fireworks still went on as usual, but in an undisclosed location. It was revealed to be the Kentucky Speedway.

== Activities ==
Riverfest is filled with many activities, including the Rubber Duck Regatta, in which hundreds of thousands of rubber ducks are released into the Ohio River to benefit the Freestore Foodbank. The festival ends with a gathering on the banks of the Ohio River in Cincinnati, Ohio, Covington, Kentucky, and Newport, Kentucky to watch a half-hour fireworks show set to an underscore heard on WEBN. The fireworks are provided by Rozzi's Famous Fireworks Inc. The show attracts nearly 500,000 to the area every year. Over 2,500 boats jam the river to get a front row seat for the show, and the river is patrolled by the United States Coast Guard, Kentucky Department of Fish and Wildlife Resources, Ohio Department of Natural Resources, and local units from Cincinnati and Covington. The river is normally closed between the Roebling Suspension Bridge and the "Big Mac" (Interstate 471) bridge.
