= Little Yellow Duck Project =

UK project raising awareness of organ donation

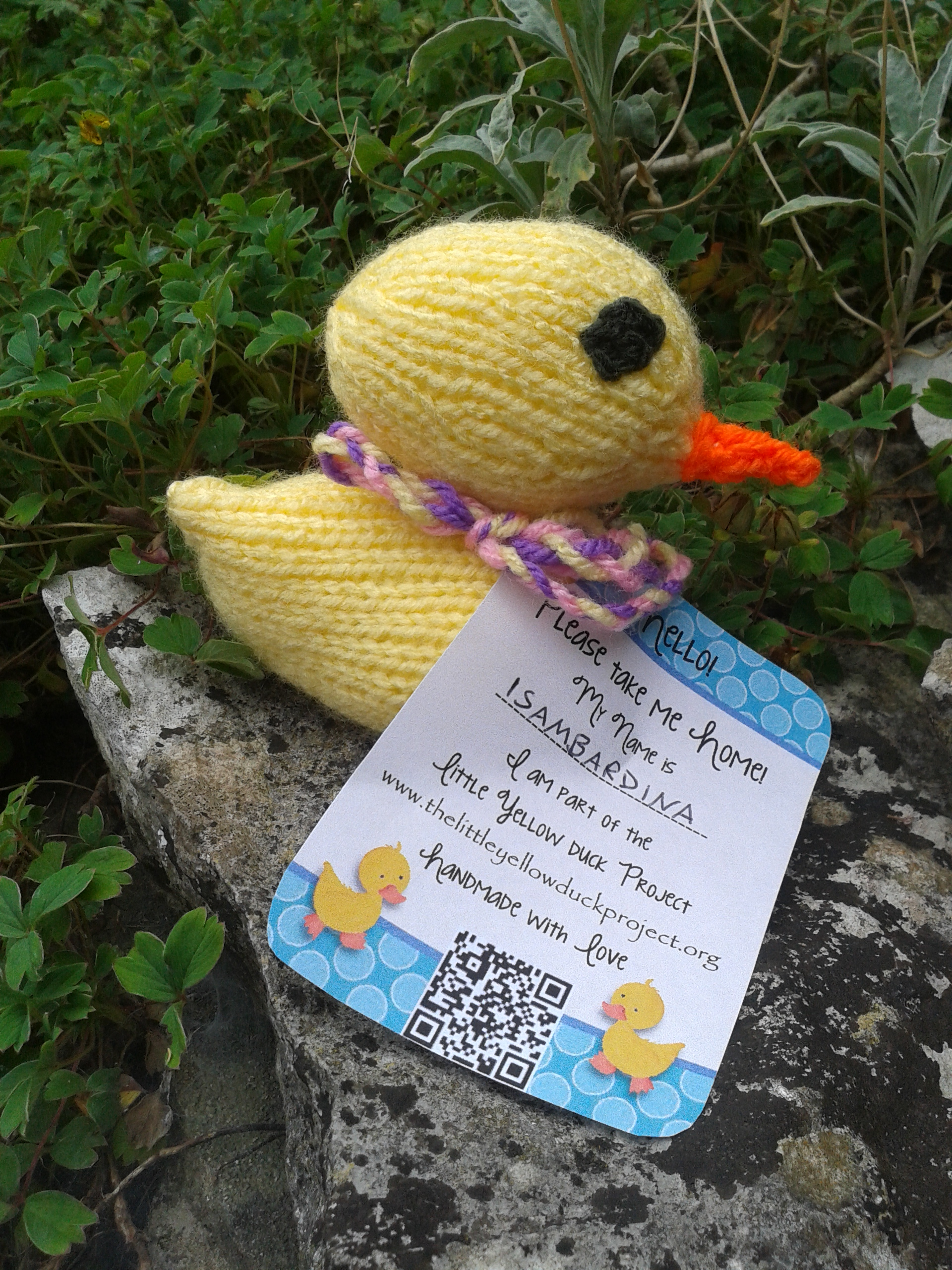
A duck tagged for the project and ready to be found

The Little Yellow Duck Project is a UK-based international project started in 2014 to raise consciousness of the need for organ, stem cell and blood donors and to encourage small random acts of kindness. Participants are invited to knit, crochet or otherwise create small yellow ducks and then leave them in public places to be found by strangers. Each duck has a tag introducing the project, often naming the duck, and encouraging the finder to log on to the project website. There they can record the finding of the duck and learn more about the need for organ, stem cell and blood donors and how to become one.

The project was started by British woman Emma Harris in memory of her friend Clare Cruickshank, who died from cystic fibrosis aged 26 on 15 April 2013 while waiting for a double lung transplant. Cruickshank had collected rubber ducks during her life, and this inspired the project. It has received international media coverage including crafting blogs and websites, knitting magazines, and an Australian radio show.

The project was launched on 15 April 2014, the first anniversary of Cruickshank's death, and as of 3 August 2025 15,909 ducks had been recorded in 96 countries. Earlier records had shown up to 107 countries, but the system was revised in March 2022 to include only sovereign countries, excluding, for example, the Isle of Man.
