= Hook-a-duck =

Fairground game

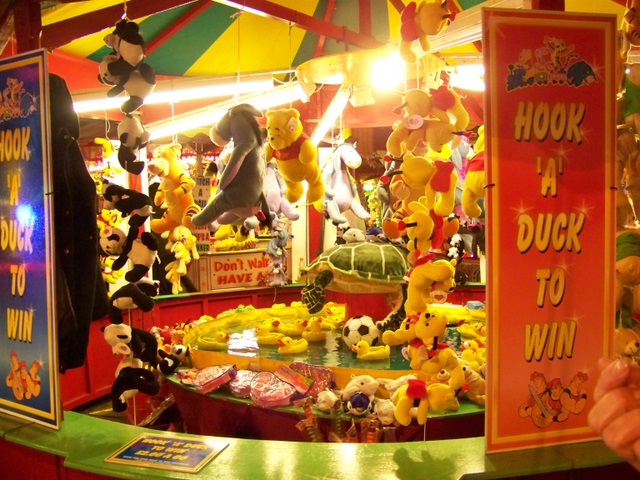
A hook-a-duck stall at a funfair in Salisbury, England

Hook-a-duck is a traditional fairground stall game, also known as duck pond. A number of rubber ducks are floated in a water trough. The ducks have metal rings fastened to their heads. Although the ducks appear identical, they bear hidden marks or numbers on their bases.

== Play ==
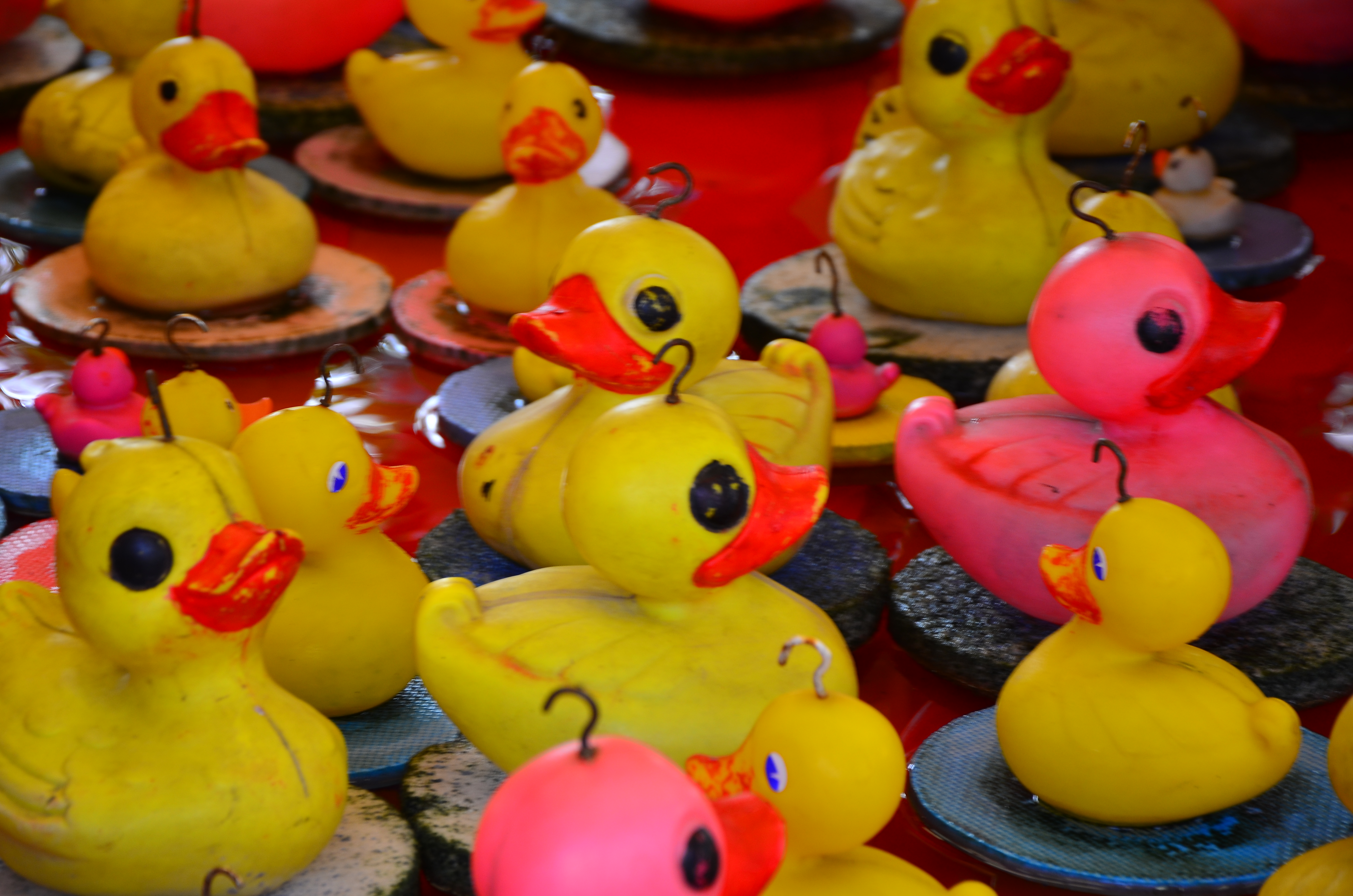
Hook-a-duck ducks

The contestant is required to capture ducks using a pole with a hook at one end. Each captured duck is examined to reveal whether it is a winning duck or a losing duck.

In some versions of the game some ducks are "winning ducks" and others not, and the contestant is given three attempts to hook them. The number of winning ducks caught corresponds to a prize: three winning ducks is equivalent to a top prize; two winning ducks to a middle prize; and one winning duck to a low prize.

In another version, each duck has a number on its base corresponding to a specific prize.

== Deceptive operation ==
Although presented as a game of skill, it is really a game of chance with the odds stacked against the contestant. In a game with hidden marks, the ratio of ducks with a hidden mark to ducks without a hidden mark is always low meaning that very few contestants secure three winning ducks. The majority secure one or two winning ducks. In some cases the contestant will be unable to secure any winning ducks. There is no prize for this.

When the ducks are marked with numbers, the stall operator can ensure that the ducks in the pool only correspond to low-value prizes. In 1983, Indiana Attorney General Dan Foley spoke of local funfairs attaching high-value ducks to the ceiling of the stall with magnets, to be quickly knocked down into the pool with the other ducks if a police inspection was thought to be imminent.

The modern British version of hook-a-duck seen at fairgrounds is much simpler. After paying to play, players hook any duck and then choose a prize. The business model is that the cost to play the game is higher than the original purchase price of the prizes, which are bought wholesale.
