= Rubber duck =

Stylized, floating duck-shaped toy

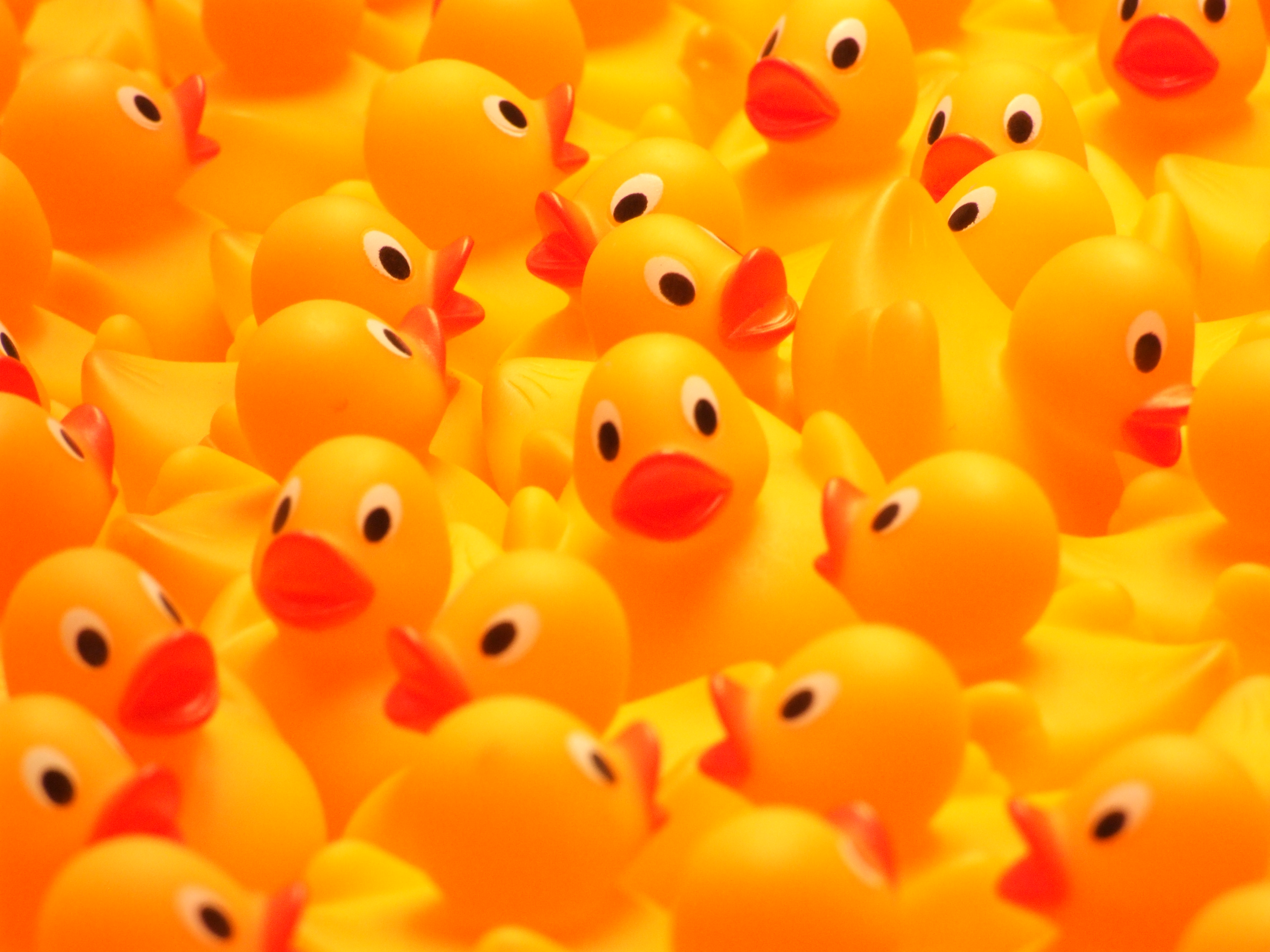
Several 2006 era rubber ducks

The squeaker of a rubber duck

A rubber duck, or rubber duckie, is a toy shaped like a duck that is usually yellow with a flat base. It may be made of rubber or rubber-like material such as vinyl plastic. Rubber ducks were invented in the late 19th century when it became possible to more easily shape rubber, and are believed to improve developmental skills in children during water play.

The yellow rubber duck has achieved an iconic status in Western pop culture and is often symbolically linked to bathing. Various novelty variations of the toy are produced, and many organizations use yellow rubber ducks in rubber duck races for fundraising worldwide.

== History ==
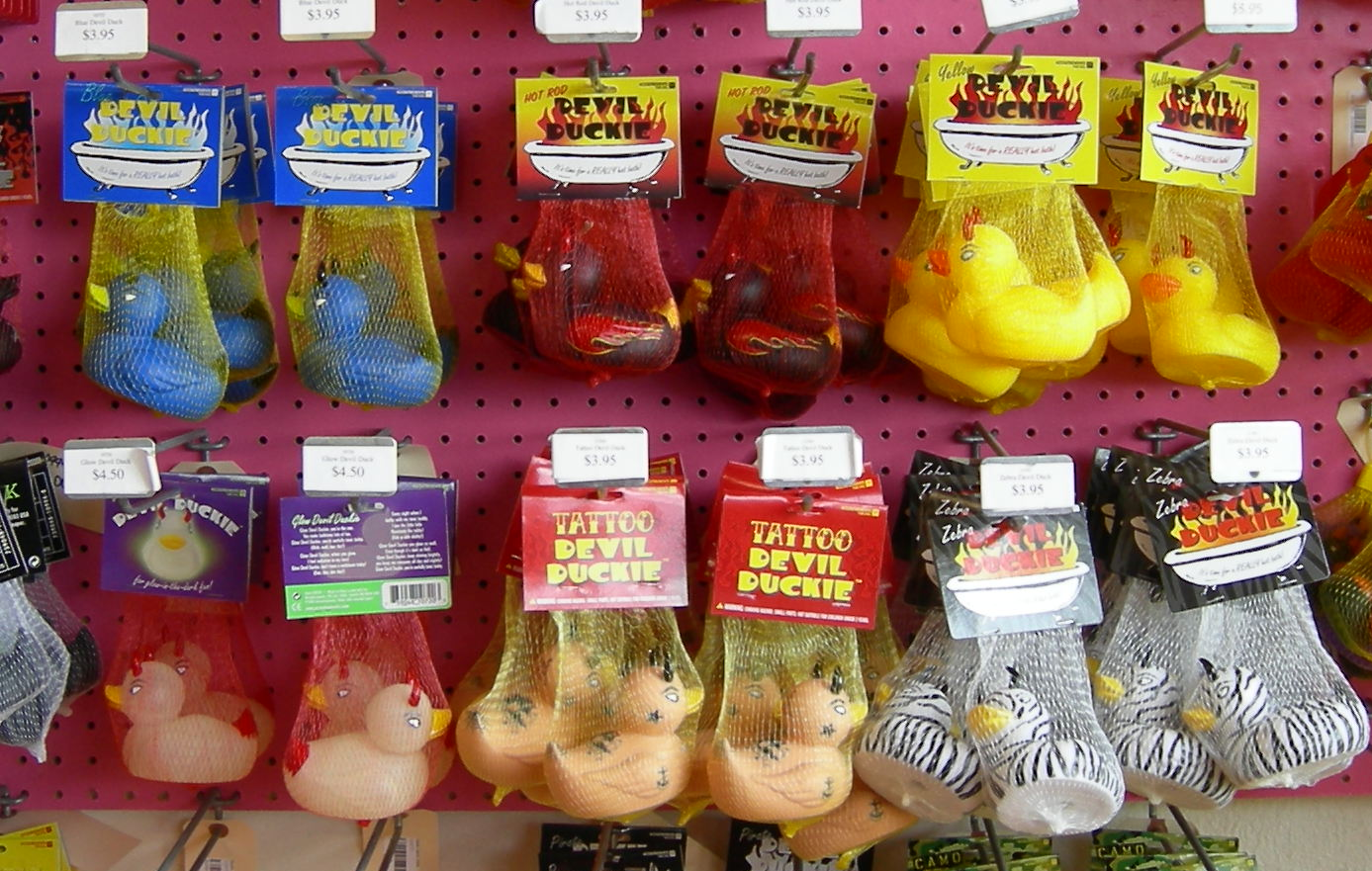
A variety of novelty "Devil Duckies"

The history of the rubber duck is linked to the emergence of rubber manufacturing in the late 19th century. The earliest rubber ducks were made from harder rubber when manufacturers began using Charles Goodyear's invention, vulcanized rubber. Consequently, these solid rubber ducks were not capable of floating and were instead intended as chew toys.

In 1948, Hong Kong company Winsome Plastic Works started producing rubber duck toys designed by the company's founder L.T. Lam.

Sculptor Peter Ganine created a sculpture of a duck in the 1940s. He filed a U.S. design patent for a toy duck on December 29, 1947, and the patent was granted on April 26, 1949. He later reproduced the design as a floating toy, of which over 50 million were sold.

Besides the ubiquitous yellow rubber duck with which most people are familiar, there have been numerous novelty variations on the basic theme, including character ducks representing professions, politicians, or celebrities, a concept introduced by Mark Boldt's Rubba Ducks. There are also ducks that glow in the dark, quack, change color, have interior LED illumination, or include a wind-up mechanism that enables them to "swim". In 2001, The Sun, a British tabloid reported that Queen Elizabeth II had a rubber duck in her bathroom that wore an inflatable crown. The duck was spotted by a workman who was repainting her bathroom. The story prompted sales of rubber ducks in the United Kingdom to increase by 80% for a short period.

Rubber ducks are collected by enthusiasts. The 2011 Guinness World Record for World's Largest Rubber Duck Collection stood at 5,631 different rubber ducks, and was awarded to Charlotte Lee. In 2013, the rubber duck was inducted into the Toy Hall of Fame, a museum in Rochester, New York, along with the game of chess. Toys are selected based on factors like icon-status, longevity, and innovation.

== In popular culture ==
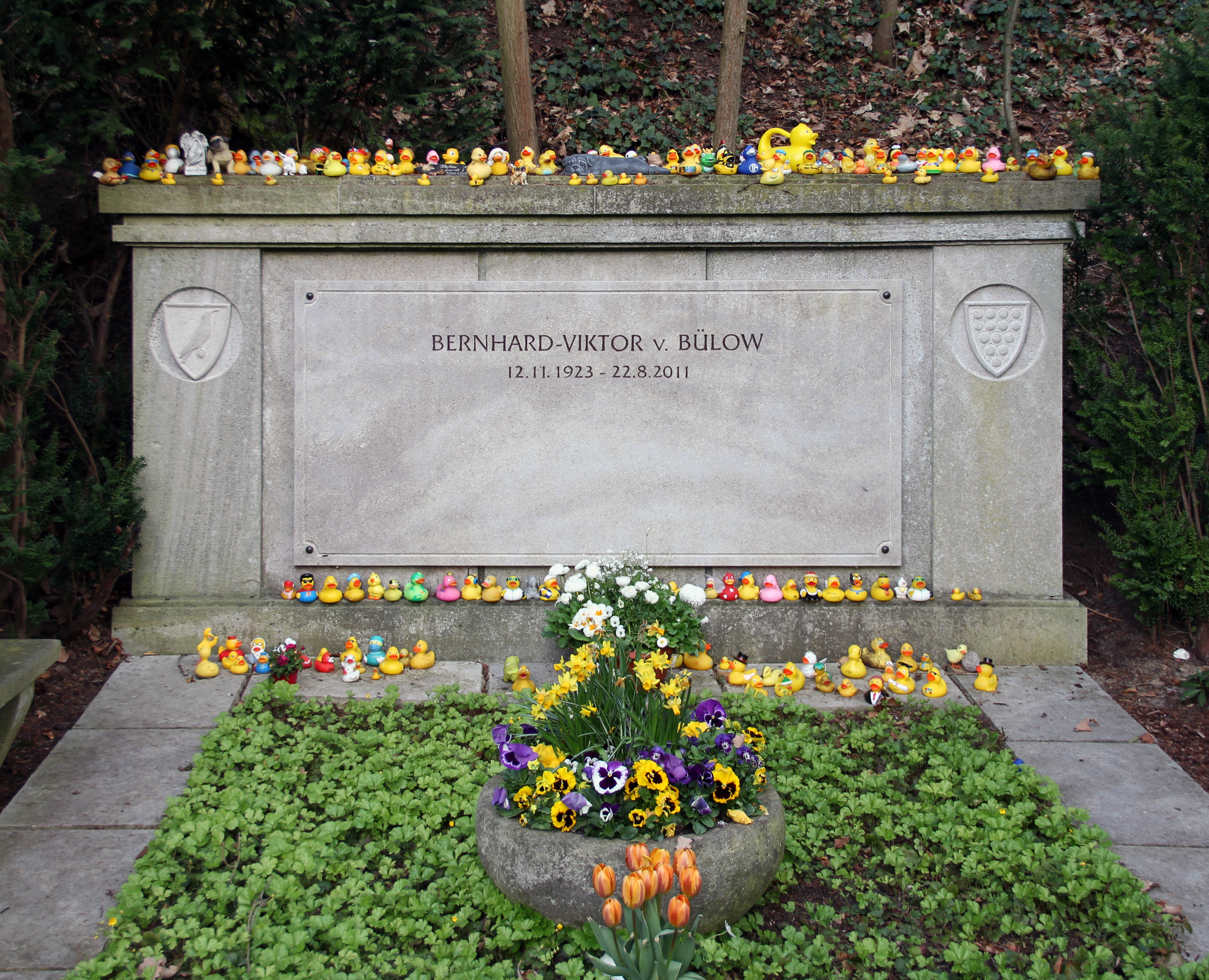
Rubber ducks on the grave of German humorist Vicco von Bülow, paying tribute to one of his best-known comedy sketches

Ernie, a popular Muppet from the television show Sesame Street, has performed the song "Rubber Duckie" multiple times since the series began. Ernie frequently spoke to his rubber duckie and carried it with him in other segments of the show. On a special occasion, Little Richard performed the song.

C. W. McCall's hit song "Convoy" (and the movie and novel it inspired) are narrated from the viewpoint of a character who replaced the bulldog hood ornament on his Mack truck with a bathtub toy and used the on-air handle of "Rubber Duck".

The Akron RubberDucks minor league baseball team, formerly known as the "Aeros", officially adopted the nickname on October 29, 2013. The nickname pays tribute to the city's history in the rubber industry, particularly as the birthplace of companies such as Goodyear, Firestone, B.F. Goodrich, and General Tire.

=== Protest symbol ===
Rubber ducks have also become a protest symbol simultaneously in Belgrade, Brazil, and Moscow in 2017, and in Bangkok in 2020.

=== World's largest rubber duck ===
The world's largest rubber duck was created by Dutch artist Florentijn Hofman in 2007, measuring 16.5 m × 20 m × 32 m (54 ft × 66 ft × 105 ft) and weighing about 600 kilograms (1,300 lb). Since 2007, several ducks of various sizes created by Hofman have been on display in countries and territories such as Amsterdam, Netherlands; Lommel, Belgium; Osaka, Japan; Sydney, Australia; São Paulo, Brazil; Hong Kong, China; Kaohsiung, Taiwan; and Seoul, Korea; until 14 November 2014, and went on display in the United States after 20 October 2013.

In 2013, China's "Great Firewall" blocked searches for "big yellow duck" because Chinese activists were photo-shopping the Rubber Duck sculpture into the Tank Man photo of the Tiananmen Square Massacre. If the term "Big Yellow Duck" were searched, a message appeared stating that according to relevant laws, statutes, and policies, the results of the search could not be shown.

=== Races ===
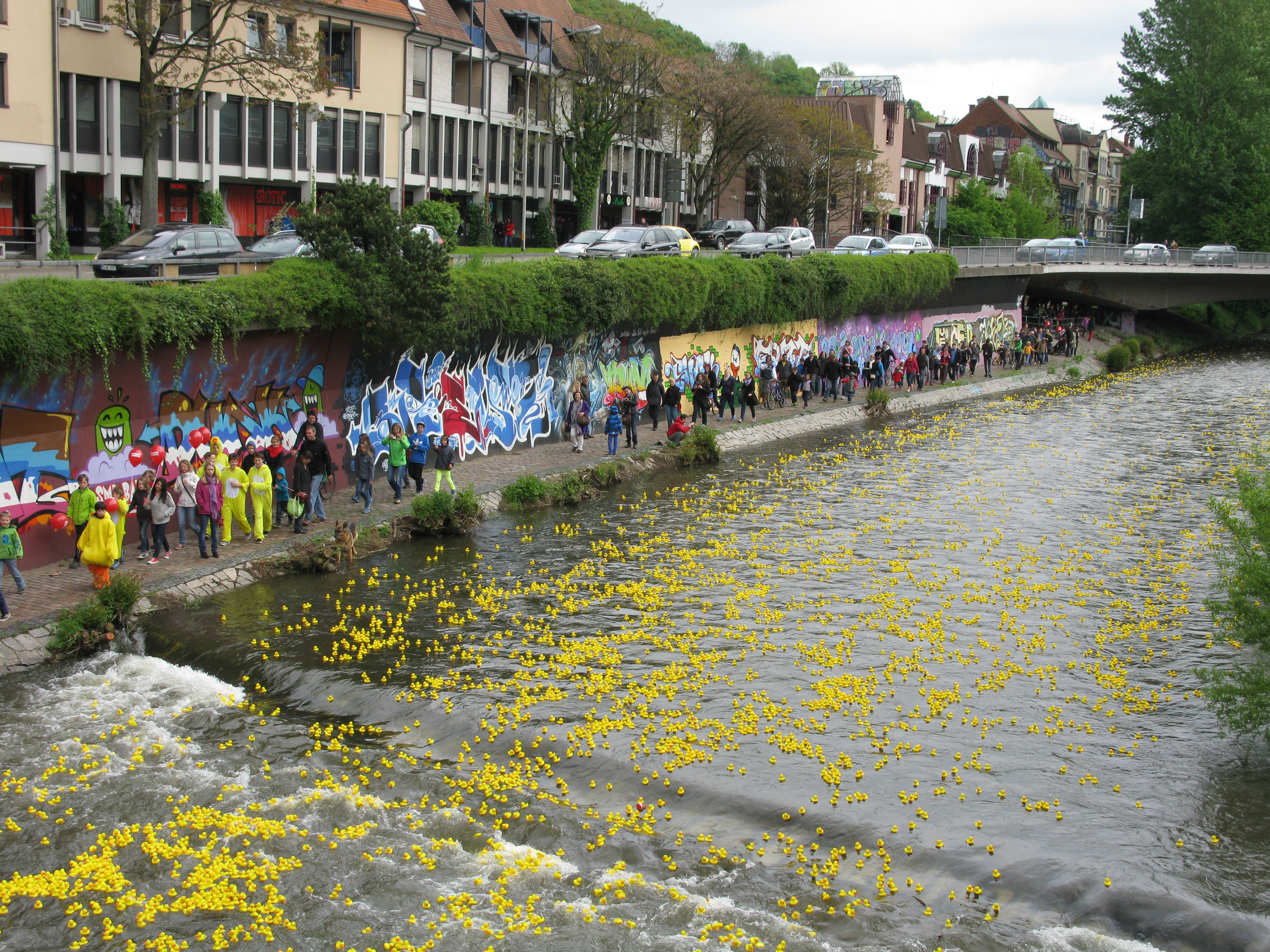
A rubber duck race in Freiburg im Breisgau, Germany

Rubber duck races, also known as derby duck races, have been used as a method of fundraising for organizations worldwide. People donate money to the organization by sponsoring a duck. At the end of the fundraising drive, all of the ducks are dumped into a waterway, with the first to float past the finish line winning a prize for its sponsor.

=== Automobiles ===
In the United States, rubber ducks have become associated with the Jeep brand of sport utility vehicles. It is a custom among some Jeep owners to leave a rubber duck on the hood of another Jeep as a compliment or random act of kindness.

== Scientific studies ==
=== Oceanography ===
During a Pacific storm on 10 January 1992, three 40-foot (12 m) containers holding 28,800 Friendly Floatees plastic bathtub toys from a Chinese factory were washed off a ship, containing 7,200 each of blue turtles, yellow ducks, red beavers, and green frogs. Two-thirds of the toys floated south and landed three months later on the shores of Indonesia, Australia, and South America. The remaining 10,000 toys headed north to Alaska and then completed a full circle back near Japan, caught up in the same North Pacific Gyre current as the so-called Great Pacific Garbage Patch. Many of the toys then entered the Bering Strait between Alaska and Russia and were trapped in the Arctic ice. They moved through the ice at a rate of one mile (1.6 km) per day, and in 2000 they were sighted in the North Atlantic. The movement of the toys had been monitored by American oceanographer Curtis Ebbesmeyer. Bleached by sun and seawater, the ducks and beavers had faded to white, but the turtles and frogs had kept their original colors.

This incident was the subject of Donovan Hohn's 2011 book Moby-Duck: The True Story of 28,800 Bath Toys Lost at Sea, and the inspiration for Eric Carle's 2005 picture book 10 Little Rubber Ducks.

=== Glacial melting ===
In August 2008, NASA's Jet Propulsion Laboratory undertook studies of Greenland's Jacobshavn Isbræ to determine how interior glacial melt flow during the summer influenced its movement. A sophisticated football-sized probe that had a GPS device, pressure sensor, thermometer and accelerometer was lowered by rope into one of the glacier's moulins. The probe's equipment was designed to find structures such as waterfalls inside the ice. Unfortunately the probe went silent, so ninety rubber ducks marked in English, Danish, and Inuit with the text "science experiment" and "reward", along with an email address to contact if found, were also put into the moulins and it was hoped that the ducks would eventually exit and be found by hunters or fishermen around Baffin Bay. As of 2012, none of the ducks were found or returned, possibly due to being trapped in large aquifers later discovered inside the ice.

=== 67P/Churyumov–Gerasimenko ===
A rubber duck was used in the planning of the landing of the Philae lander on 67P/Churyumov–Gerasimenko due to the comet having a shape resembling a rubber duck.

== See also ==
- Hook-a-duck
- Little Yellow Duck Project
- Rubber duck debugging
- Rubber Duckie
- Rubber Duck (sculpture)
