= World's Largest Rubber Duck =

Inflatable duck

The World's Largest Rubber Duck, sometimes called Mama Duck, is a 60-foot-tall, 15.5-ton inflatable rubber duck.

The rubber duck, better known as the #Kindness Duck, is part of a larger Kindness Duck Project. Founded by Mark Burrows, the projects aims to simply spread kindness. When the Kindness Duck visits a city, numerous things come along with it, including Food Truck Row, Vendor Alley, Charity Lane, Drink Stations, Tarrant Health Vaccine Clinic, an open playground area, commercial vendors, a Kids zone, and a Nanda Yoga/training area.
