= Freestore Foodbank =

U.S. non-profit organization

The Freestore Foodbank is the largest emergency food and services provider to children and families in Greater Cincinnati, Northern Kentucky and Southeast Indiana.

== Background ==
The organization distributes 24 million meals annually to low-income individuals and families. The Freestore Foodbank supports 400 community partners in 20 counties throughout Kentucky, Ohio and Indiana, including food kitchens, homeless shelters, emergency food pantries, social service centers and program sites. By providing emergency food distribution, the Freestore Foodbank responds to the issue of poverty and food insecurity, and provides an array of services (emergency clothing, housing services, SNAP assistance, Medicaid outreach and others) aimed at creating self-reliance.

The Freestore Foodbank is a member of Feeding America.

The Rubber Duck Regatta, an annual rubber duck race on the Ohio River during the Cincinnati Riverfest, benefits the Freestore Foodbank.

== See also ==
- List of food banks
