= Florentijn Hofman =

Dutch artist (born 1977)

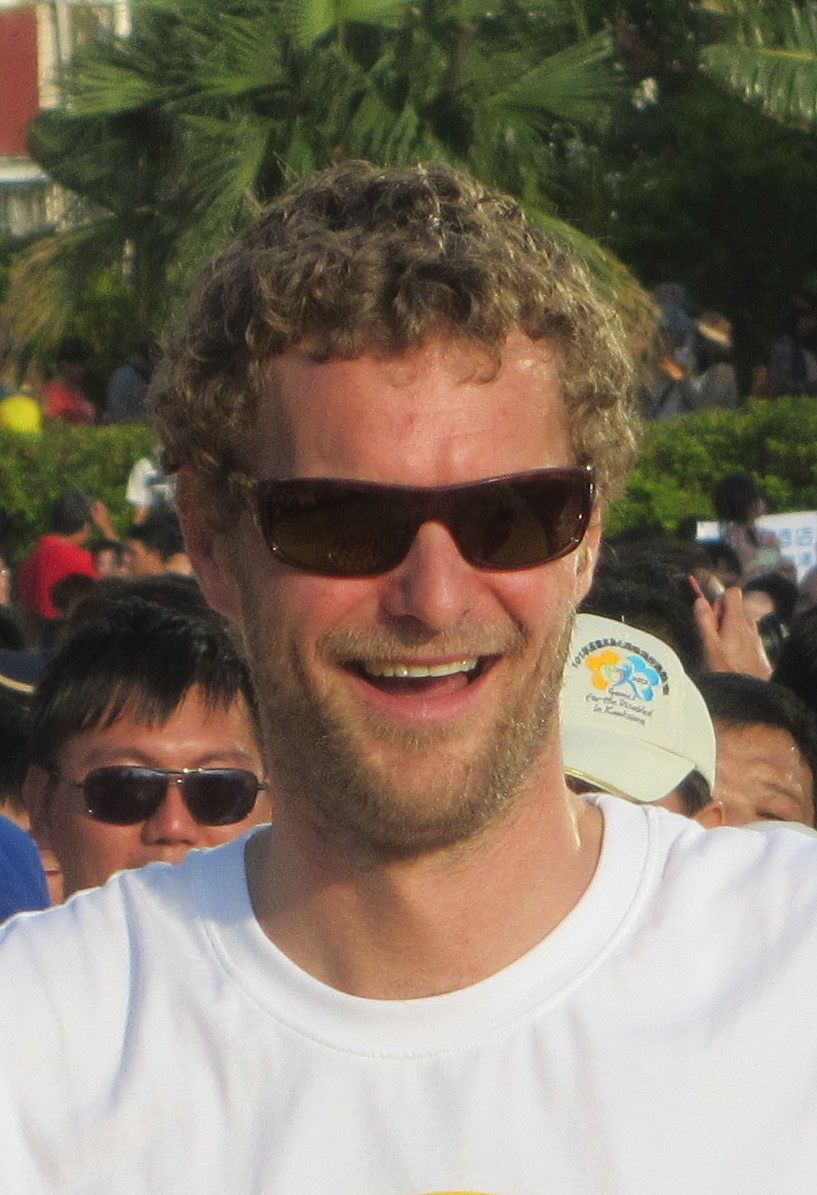
- Born: 16 April 1977 (age 48); Delfzijl, Netherlands
- Notable work: Rubber Duck
- Children: 4
- Website: florentijnhofman.nl

Florentijn Hofman (born 16 April 1977) is a Dutch artist who creates urban installations like the Rubber Duck and the HippopoThames, a 2014 installation on the River Thames in London.

== Life and career ==
Hofman was born on 16 April 1977 in Delfzijl in the Netherlands. He attended primary and secondary school in Emmen. He studied arts at the art academy of Kampen. He earned a master's degree in art in Weissensee, Berlin.

=== Artwork ===
He mostly works on reproducing huge and large versions of everyday objects, such as laminate large flooring and flip-flops. The purpose of his art is to promote the message of healing.

In 2005, he created a giant bird for the 2005 Crossing Border Festival, where it was perched atop The Hague's City Hall. In 2006, the bird was installed in Rotterdam's Natural History Museum, whose staff hoped that the statue would prevent birds from flying into the buildings glass windows.

His best-known work, Rubber Duck, made its debut in 2007 in Saint-Nazaire, France, and has since appeared in many cities around the world. In 2011, the Hyōgo Prefectural Museum of Art in Kobe, Japan, commissioned him to create another work, which became the Kobe Frog. The museum had initially wanted Rubber Duck to be placed on its roof, which Hofman declined. In 2014, he introduced HippopoThames on the River Thames in London, and Moon Rabbit in Taiwan, ahead of a land-art festival taking place in Taoyuan. In 2016, he created a floating fish sculpture in Wuzhen, China, and two animal sculptures called PETS for Amsterdam's Schiphol Airport. In 2017, he created the Kraken playground in Shenzhen, China, on a site that had been occupied by a former Soviet aircraft carrier.

Hofman's sculptures are temporary—even the Rubber Duck, which makes appearances in cities around the world, is created anew locally. He likes this because wealthy private collectors or those who see art solely as an investment are not able to buy his sculptures. In a 2013 interview, he stated "I'm not a big believer in 'art is forever'. A lot of art is bought by people who have money. But I'm a supporter of public art in public spaces." He is also strictly against commercialization of his art, and only sells miniature replicas, whose profits go to local nonprofits. In Hong Kong in 2013, it was the Joyful (Mental Health) Foundation; in Pittsburgh in 2014, it was the Pittsburgh Cultural Trust.

Hofman has created six giant Gouldian finches for Messengers of Brisbane, a public installation supposed to bring hope, joy and art exclusively to Brisbane during Brisbane Festival 2020. This project was produced in collaboration with UAP and Brisbane Festival.

He canceled an appearance in Keelung, Taiwan, to protest the fact that the organizers had turned the sculpture into a "commercial circus". He has been criticized as "reproductions do not infringe on an intellectual copyright that Hofman can't legitimately claim as his own".

=== Television ===
Hofman was one of the contestants in the twenty-first season of the Dutch television series Wie is de Mol? He was eliminated in the third episode of the show.

== Gallery ==
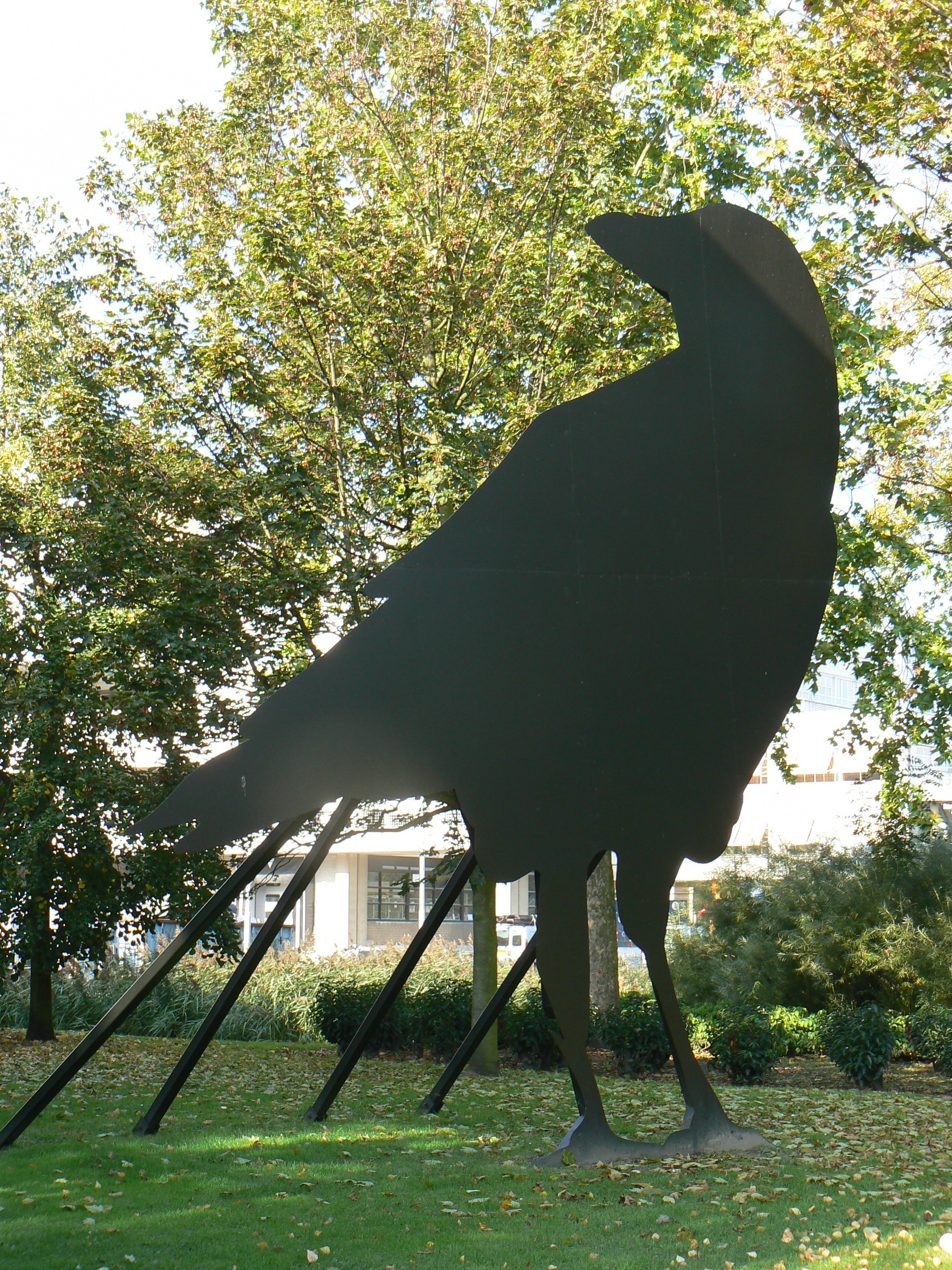
Crow at Natural History Museum Rotterdam

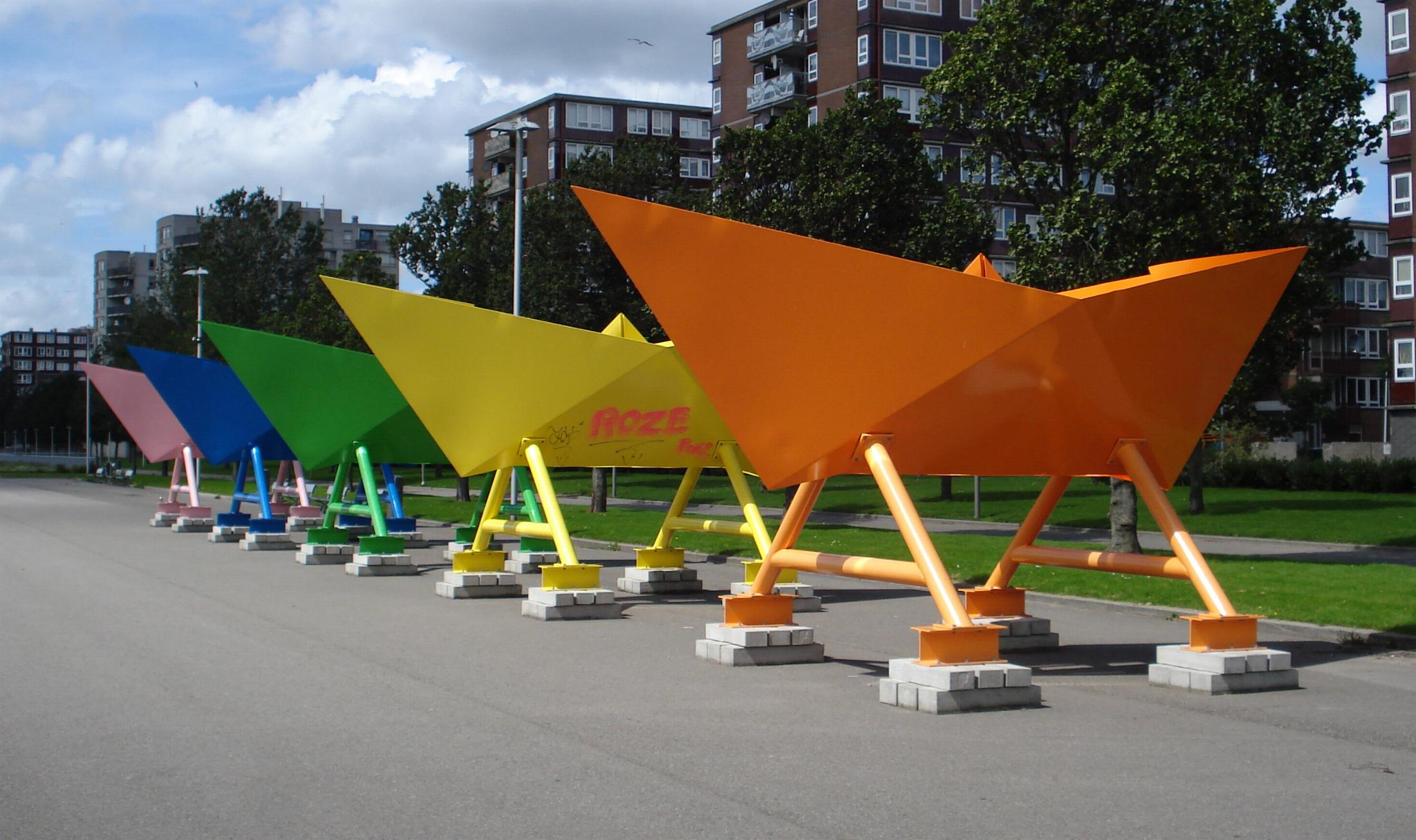
Paper Boats in Rotterdam

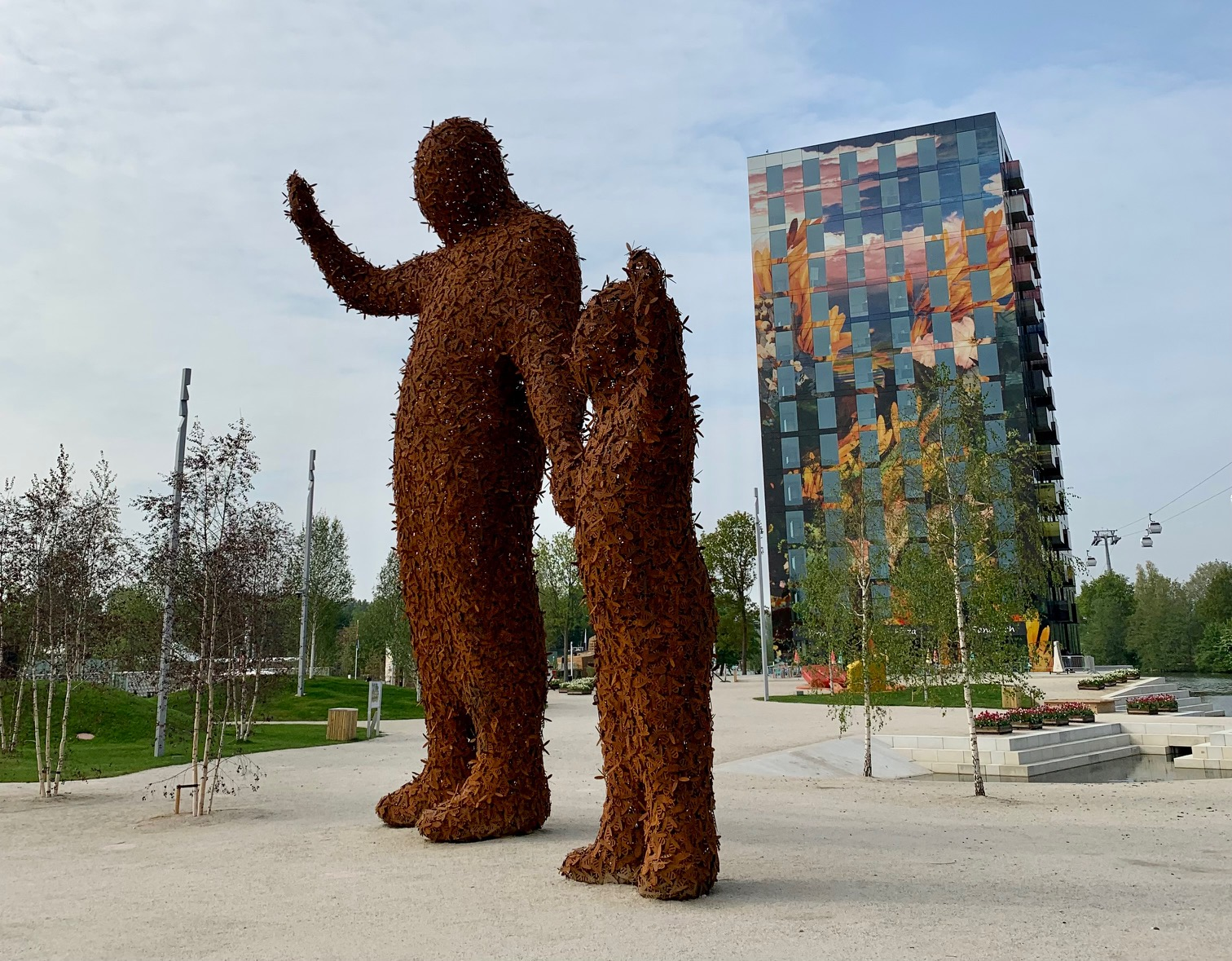
Beehold at Floriade 2022 in Almere, Netherlands, 2022

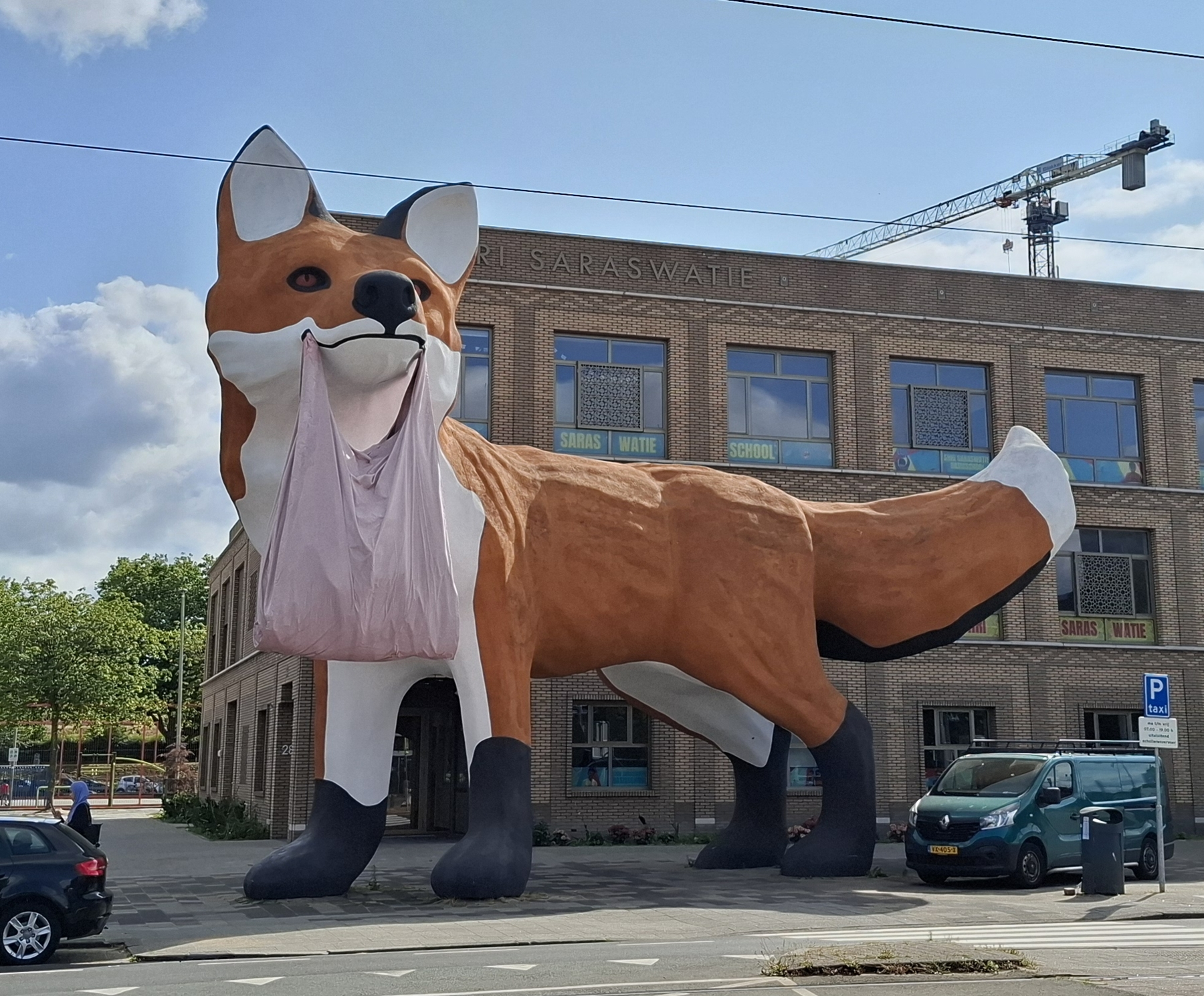
Bospoldervos (Dutch for Bospolder fox) is a sculpture located in the Bospolder-Tussendijken neighbourhood in Rotterdam, depicting an enormous fox that is carrying a pink bag in its mouth.

== See also ==
- Bospoldervos
- Rubber Duck (sculpture)
