= Beloit Riverfest =

Former music festival in Wisconsin

Coordinates: 42°30′35″N 89°01′58″W

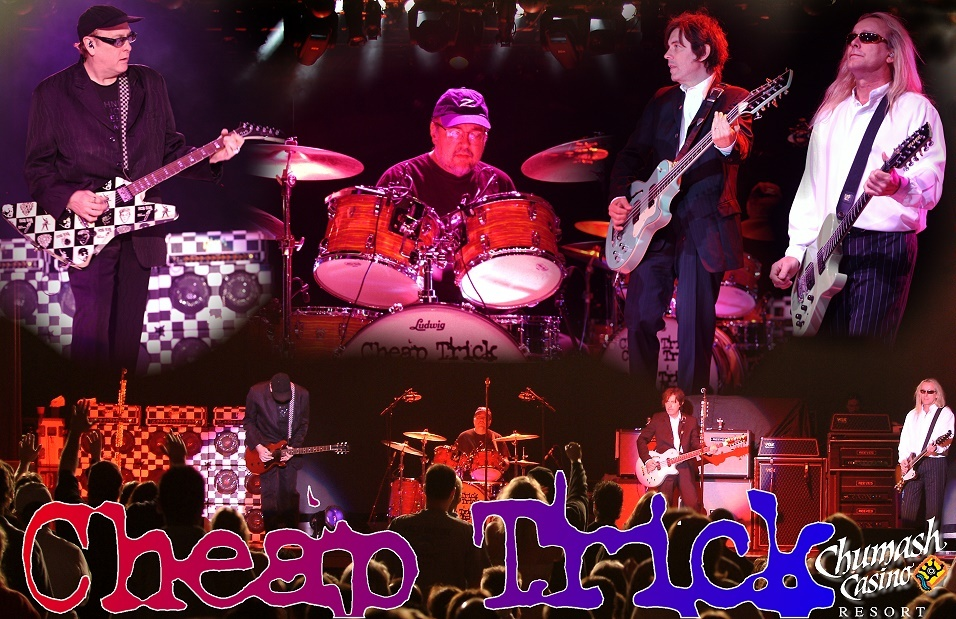
Cheap Trick

Beloit Riverfest was an annual music festival in Beloit, Wisconsin, usually held at Riverside Park. The festival featured multiple stages of music, a carnival, and food and merchandise vendors.

The festival held its 25th and final edition in 2012. Later that year, the Riverfest Board of Directors voted not to hold the festival in 2013, citing reduced financial support and difficulty recruiting new board members.

== History and location ==
Riverside Park was Riverfest's long-established home. The 2011 festival ran from July 7 to 10. For the festival's 25th anniversary in 2012, organizers moved it downstream to the grassy River Bend area between Shirland Avenue and the Beloit post office. The move was required after the Wisconsin Department of Transportation would not permit the usual closure of Highway 51 while the Henry Avenue bridge was under construction. The five-day festival ran from June 27 to July 1.

== Past performers ==
Groups that have performed at Riverfest include:

- 12 Stones
- The Beach Boys
- Blue Öyster Cult
- Johnny Cash
- Ray Charles
- Temptations
- Gladys Knight
- Foreigner
- Cheap Trick
- Collective Soul
- Alice Cooper
- Crossfade
- Earth, Wind, and Fire
- Hootie and the Blowfish
- K.C. and the Sunshine Band
- B.B. King
- Foghat
- Kool and the Gang
- Little Richard
- Lynyrd Skynyrd
- The Outlaws
- Ted Nugent
- REO Speedwagon
- Quiet Riot
- Saliva
- Evans Blue
- Halestorm
- Shinedown
- Silvertide
- Smash Mouth
- Rick Springfield
- Styx
- Survivor
- Tesla
- Trapt
- "Weird Al" Yankovic
