= Teddybear Airdrop Minsk 2012 =

Swedish protest supporting the Belarusian opposition

Teddybear Airdrop Minsk 2012 was an aerial event that took place over Belarus on 4 July 2012. An airplane, chartered by the Swedish advertising agency Studio Total, illegally entered the Belarusian airspace on 4 July and parachuted several hundred teddy bears with notes carrying pro-democracy messages. After denying for three weeks that the incident ever took place and calling the footage of the airdrop released by Studio Total a hoax, the Belarus government finally acknowledged on 26 July 2012, that the teddy bear airdrop did happen.

The event greatly angered the President of Belarus Alexander Lukashenko, who viewed it as a significant national security failure. Lukashenko sacked two top generals, the heads of Belarus' border guards and of Air Defense, for failing to intercept the Studio Total plane. The airdrop led to an escalating diplomatic crisis in relations between Belarus and Sweden. On 3 August 2012, Belarus expelled the Swedish Ambassador Stefan Eriksson and subsequently ordered the remaining staff of the Swedish embassy to leave Belarus by the end of the month. Belarus also withdrew its ambassador and all of its embassy staff from Sweden.

== The airdrop ==
On 4 July 2012, a small airplane, chartered by the Swedish advertising agency Studio Total and with two people on board, took off from an airfield in Lithuania and illegally entered the Belarus airspace. The plane dropped several hundred teddy bears, carrying cards and notes with pro-democracy, pro-freedom of speech and protest messages, over the Belarusian town of Ivyanets, near Minsk. The organizers of the airdrop originally planned to drop some of the teddy bears over state government buildings in Minsk, but uncertainties over the fuel supply and also the fact that the plane had been contacted by the Belarusian air traffic controllers resulted in a decision to drop the bears over Ivyanets and then head back. The plane crossed back over the border into Lithuania without encountering any interference from the Belarusian military. Per Cromwell, the founder of Studio Total, was in a car on the ground in Ivyanets during the airdrop. Various news reports put the total number of teddy bears dropped at around 800.

The airdrop operation was dubbed "Teddybear Airdrop Minsk 2012" by its Studio Total organizers.

One of the pilots of the Studio Total plane involved in the airdrop, Tomas Mazetti, stated that the idea to use teddy bears came from Belarusian pro-democracy activists, who had been arrested on many occasions by the authorities and started carrying teddy bears with protest slogans demanding freedom of speech. The teddy bears were regularly confiscated by the police and the Studio Total airdrop was intended as a solidarity gesture: "we flew in teddy bears and airdropped them to support those arrested teddy bears". Studio Total maintains that no Belarusian democracy activists were involved in planning the teddy bear airdrop. According to Mazetti, the flight inside Belarusian airspace lasted for about an hour and a half, at the altitude of about 50 meters, or 150 feet.

The two people on board the teddy bear flight, Tomas Mazetti and Hannah Frey, spent about a year preparing for the airdrop operation. Their preparations included buying a three-seater Jodel plane and learning to pilot it, spending the equivalent of about US$184,500 in the process.

== Reaction by Belarus ==
After the airdrop Studio Total released several short video-clips of the operation. A number of videos, made by Belarusians who observed the drop, of parachuting teddy bears were posted on YouTube and went viral. However, the initial reaction both by the Swedish media and by the Belarusian state media, to the Studio Total claims of the airdrop, was skeptical.

=== Initial official denials ===
The Belarusian authorities initially issued stringent denials that the teddy bear airdrop ever occurred and that there was no unauthorized intrusion of the Belarus air space on 4 July. Belarusian government officials claimed that the Studio Total video of the drop was fake and characterized it as a "hoax" designed to embarrass the Belarus government. About a week after the drop Studio Total released about 90 minutes of raw unedited video-footage taken during the 4 July flight. Radio Free Europe examined the footage and concluded that it appeared to be authentic. Nevertheless, the Belurasian government continued to deny that the airdrop happened.

=== Arrests of journalists ===
On 13 July authorities in Belarus arrested a 20-year-old student journalist, Anton Suryapin, who posted on his website, Bnp.by, some of the first photos related to the teddy bear airdrop. Suryapin wrote on his website that he was e-mailed the photos by one of the local residents who observed the drop. Several days prior to Suryapin's arrest, the police in Minsk arrested a realtor, Syarhei Basharimau, who had rented an apartment in the capital to two Swedes connected with Studio Total. Representatives of Studio Total claim that neither Suryapin nor Basharimau were in any way involved in planning and conducting the airdrop and called for their release. Several human rights organizations, including Amnesty International also called for Suryapin's release. Both Suryapin and Basharimau, who have been formally charged, were released on bail on 17 August 2012 and faced up to seven years imprisonment. The Belarusian government publicly lifted the bail conditions and announced that the criminal case was closed on June 28 2013.

In early August 2012 two journalists, Irina Kozlik and Yulia Doroshkevich, who took photos of teddy bears in solidarity with Suryapin and Basharimau, were arrested in Minsk and then convicted of "violating the law on protests" and fined the equivalent of several hundred U.S. dollars.

=== 26 July acknowledgement ===
After three weeks of denials by the Belarusian authorities that the event actually occurred, on 26 July, President of Belarus Alexander Lukashenko finally acknowledged that the 4 July teddy bear airdrop did take place.

=== Sacking of Belarusian military officials ===
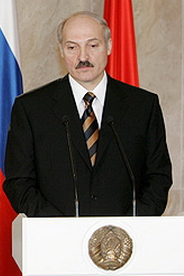
President of Belarus Alexander Lukashenko

President Lukashenko was reported to have been greatly angered by the teddy bear airdrop and by the failure of the Belarusian military to intercept it, which he viewed as a significant national security lapse. He indicated that those officials responsible for this lapse will be disciplined: "This plane was discovered in time, but why did the (air defense) authorities not intercept the flight? ... Come on lads. We are all grown up. The guilty ones have to answer for this."

On Tuesday, 31 July 2012, the Belarusian government announced that President Lukashenko had sacked two top generals, the air defense chief Dmitry Pakhmelkin, and the head of the border guards Igor Rachkovsky "for not properly carrying out their duties in safeguarding Belarusian national security."

President Lukashenko instructed the new border guards chief to shoot down any future illegal intruders of the Belarusian airspace: "Unlawful violations of state borders must not be allowed. They must be stopped by all force and means, including weapons, regardless of anything."

=== Subsequent government actions ===
On 11 August the Belarus KGB issued summons to the three Swedish organizers of the airdrop, Tomas Mazetti, Hannah Frey and Per Cromwell, to come to Belarus for questioning about the operation within 10 days. The summons were posted on the Belarus KGB website and delivered to Studio Total by e-mail and stated that failure to comply could result in "correctional work for up to two years, or imprisonment for up to six months." Studio Total refused to comply with the summons and instead offered to discuss the airdrop operation directly with President Lukashenko if he visits Sweden.

Belarus also sent an official request to the government of Lithuania for help "to investigate a possible breach of the state border when a Swedish-piloted light aircraft crossed the Lithuanian-Belarus border." President Lukashenko was quoted by Interfax saying that "Lithuania should not be sitting like mice under a broom. They must answer to us why they provided their territory for national border violation. If there is anyone who won't find it funny, it is Lithuania".

== Diplomatic row with Sweden ==
On 3 August Swedish Foreign Minister Carl Bildt announced that Belarus had "expelled" the Swedish ambassador to Belarus, Stefan Eriksson, who had been on vacation in Sweden at the time when informed that he would not be allowed back to Belarus. The Belarus government disputed Sweden's characterization of events, stating: "The Belarusian side did not expel the Swedish ambassador. The decision was made not to extend his accreditation." Belarus justified its decision by saying that the Swedish ambassador's "activities were aimed not at the strengthening of relations between Belarus and Sweden, but on their erosion."

In response the Swedish government announced that the incoming Belarusian ambassador to Sweden would not be allowed into the country and that two other Belarusian diplomats were being expelled. Subsequently, Belarus ordered all the remaining Swedish diplomatic staff to leave Belarus by 30 August.

The European Union held an urgent meeting of its diplomats on Friday, 10 August 2012, in Brussels to discuss the EU response to the escalating row between Belarus and Sweden. The EU diplomats expressed strong support for Sweden in the dispute but took no concrete action against Belarus.

Earlier reports indicated that the meeting was expected to result in a mass recall of the EU ambassadors in Belarus to their home countries.

== See also ==
- Foreign relations of Belarus
- Teddy bear parachuting
- Mathias Rust
