= Kaisei =

Kaisei may refer to:

- Kaisei (ship), the STS Kaisei
- Kaisei, Kanagawa, a town in Japan
- Kaisei Academy, a Japanese boys' school

== People with the name ==
- Kaisei Ichirō (魁聖 一郎), retired Japanese Brazilian professional sumo wrestler
- Kaisei Ishii (石井 快征; born 2000), Japanese footballer

== See also ==
- Project Kaisei, a mission to clean up the Great Pacific garbage patch
