= Moby-Duck =

Book by Donovan Hohn on the Friendly Floatees

- Cover of US edition
- Author: Donovan Hohn
- Language: English
- Subject: Friendly Floatees; Ocean currents; Marine debris
- Genre: Non-fiction
- Publisher: Viking
- Publication date: March 2011
- Publication place: United States
- Pages: 478
- ISBN: 978-0-670-02219-9
- Dewey Decimal: 551.462
- LC Class: GC231.2.H65 2010

Moby-Duck: The True Story of 28,800 Bath Toys Lost at Sea and of the Beachcombers, Oceanographers, Environmentalists, and Fools, Including the Author, Who Went in Search of Them is a book by Donovan Hohn concerning 28,800 plastic ducks and other toys, known as the Friendly Floatees, which were washed overboard from a container ship in the Pacific Ocean on 10 January 1992 and have subsequently been found on beaches around the world and used by oceanographers including Curtis Ebbesmeyer to trace ocean currents.

The book was published in the United States in March 2011 by Viking (ISBN 978-0670022199) and in the UK in February 2012 by Union Books (ISBN 978-1908526007) with a shorter subtitle: Moby-Duck: The True Story of 28,800 Bath Toys Lost at Sea. It was noted by The New York Times as one of the 100 Notable Books of 2011, shortlisted for the 2012 Helen Bernstein Book Award for Excellence in Journalism, runner-up of the 2012 PEN/E. O. Wilson Literary Science Writing Award and runner-up of the 2013 PEN/John Kenneth Galbraith Award.

The title is a reference to Herman Melville's classic seafaring novel Moby-Dick.

Cover of 2012 UK edition
