= Tokio Express =

Container ship

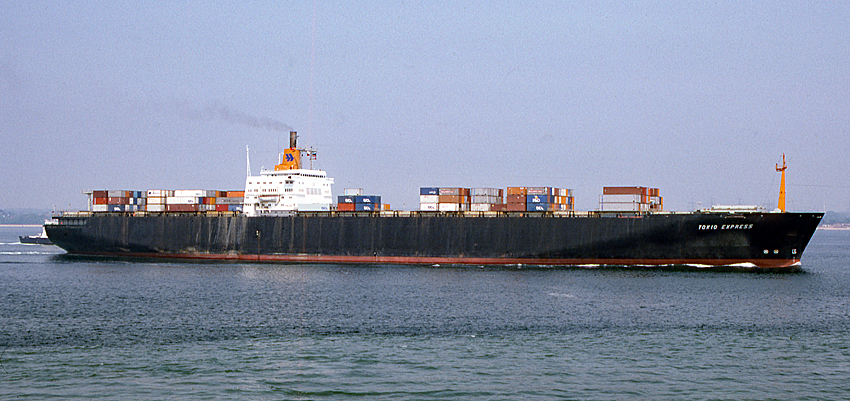
- Tokio Express off Calshot in 1988

History
- Name: Tokio Express (1973–1984); Scandutch Edo (1984–1986); Tokio Express (1986–2000)
- Operator: Hapag-Lloyd
- Port of registry: (Germany) Hamburg
- Builder: Blohm + Voss, Hamburg
- Yard number: 878
- Laid down: 12 January 1971
- Launched: 2 November 1972
- Completed: 12 April 1973
- In service: 1973–2000
- Identification: IMO number: 7232822
- Fate: Scrapped 10 January 2000, Jiangyin, China

General characteristics
- Class & type: Hamburg Express-Class (1973) Container ship
- Tonnage: 58,082 GRT; 49,532 DWT
- Length: 287.6 metres (944 ft)
- Beam: 32.3 metres (106 ft)
- Installed power: Stal-Laval AP-40 turbo-electric steam turbine, 81,131 horsepower (60,499 kW)
- Propulsion: 1 × fixed-pitch propeller
- Speed: 23 kn (43 km/h; 26 mph)

Tokio Express was a container ship, built and registered in Hamburg in 1973 for Hapag-Lloyd. In 1984 she was renamed Scandutch Edo before being acquired by Pol Gulf International in 1993 and restored to her original name. In 1997, she was acquired by Westwind International and in 1999, by Falani, before being broken up for scrap in 2000.

Tokio Express is best known for being hit by a rogue wave on 13 February 1997 that caused her to lose cargo, including one cargo container loaded with 4.8 million pieces of Lego. Ever since, Lego pieces including octopuses, dragons, flippers and flowers have been washing up on Cornwall beaches and are commonly found after storms.

== The ship ==
Tokio Express was one of four Trio class container ships built for Hapag-Lloyd by Blohm + Voss in the early 1970s. These were all 3,000-TEU class ships. The first of these was Hamburg Express, which was followed by Bremen Express, Tokio Express and finally Hongkong Express.

The ships were originally powered by twin-screw. During the 1980s they all underwent a refit that included conversion to single screw propulsion, while retaining one of the turbines.

After changing hands several times as Hapag-Lloyd upgraded their fleet, Tokio Express was eventually scrapped in 2000. The name, with the English spelling, has since been re-used for a similar sized but much more modern container ship, launched in 2000.

== Accident ==
While en route from Rotterdam to New York City on 13 February 1997, Tokio Express was hit by a rogue wave about 20 miles (32 km) off Land's End. She tilted 60 degrees one way, then 40 degrees back, losing 62 containers overboard. She put in at Southampton for attention after the accident.

One of the lost containers held 4,756,940 Lego pieces. Coincidentally, a large portion of these were destined for toy kits depicting sea adventures, in lines including Lego Pirates and Lego Aquazone. Among the pieces were 418,000 swimming flippers, 97,500 scuba tanks, 26,600 life preservers, 13,000 spear guns, and 4,200 octopuses. Sea grass, cutlasses and dragons were also well-represented.

As late as 2024, 27 years after the accident sometimes known as the Great Lego Spill, people in England, Belgium, and Ireland were still finding octopuses, dragons, diver flippers, and other plastic pieces washed ashore and caught in fishermen's nets. Pieces may have travelled much further; a Dutch shipping clerk started an inventory which now has active participants in Florida, Georgia and the Carolinas looking for the arrival of more pieces.

== See also ==
- Hansa Carrier
- Friendly Floatees
- Curtis Ebbesmeyer
- Marine plastic pollution
