= Rye Riptides =

Unmanned boat released in 2020

Rye Riptides is a boat that was made by a 5th grade class in New Hampshire that was released to the Atlantic Ocean in 2020, and spent 462 days at sea before being discovered in Norway in 2022. The boat was built by two science classes at Rye Junior High School in New Hampshire and launched on October 25, 2020; it was found on February 1, 2022, on a small uninhabited island off the larger island of Smøla.

== See also ==
- Friendly Floatees
