= Marine debris =

Human-created solid waste in the sea or ocean

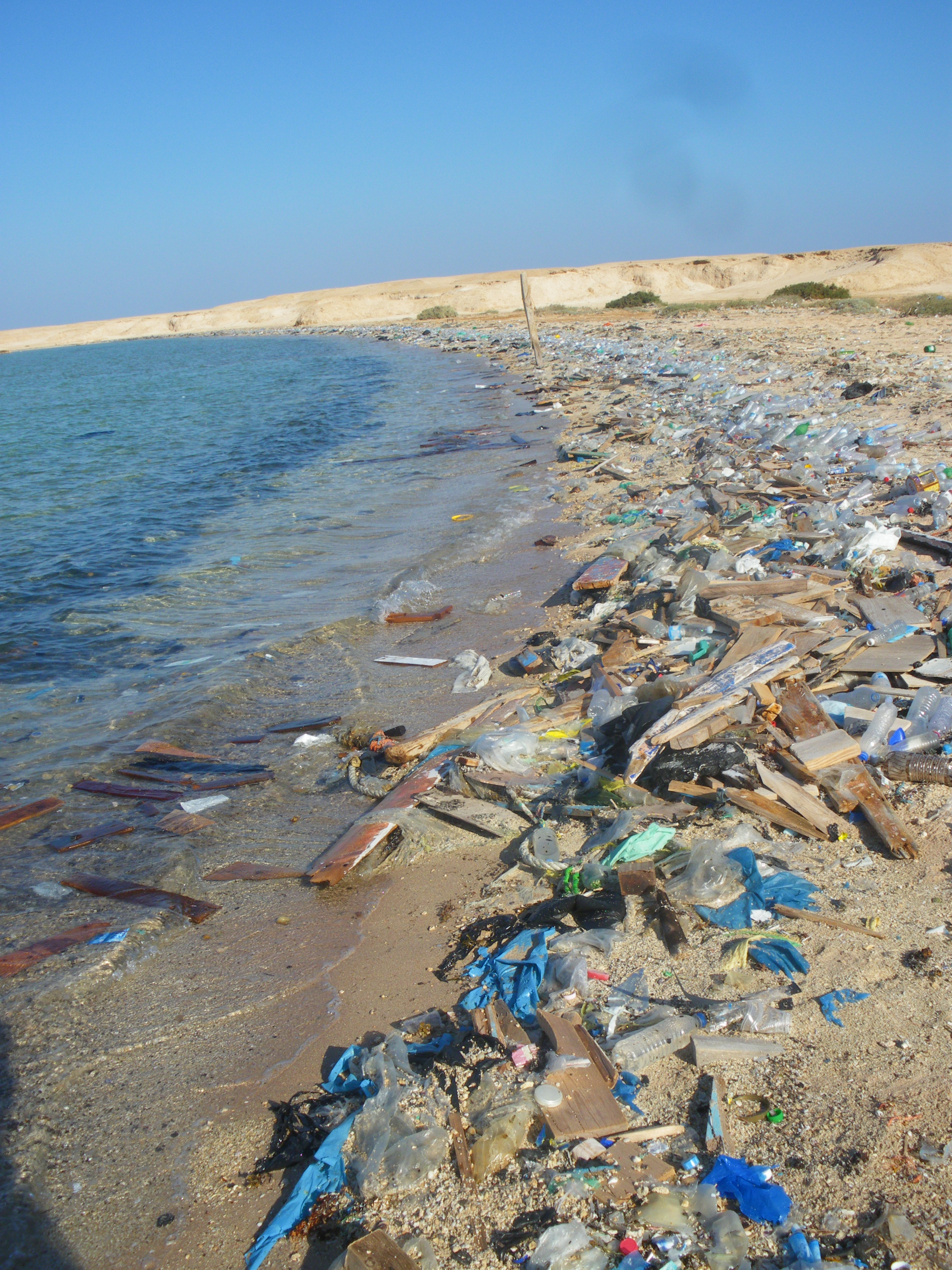
Marine debris washed up on a beach at Sharm el-Naga, Egypt

Beach litter

Marine debris, also known as marine litter, is human-created solid material that has deliberately or accidentally been released in seas or the ocean. Floating oceanic debris tends to accumulate at the center of gyres and on coastlines, frequently washing aground, when it is known as beach litter or tidewrack. Deliberate disposal of wastes at sea is called ocean dumping. Naturally occurring debris, such as driftwood and drift seeds, are also present. With the increasing use of plastic, human influence has become an issue as many types of (petrochemical) plastics do not biodegrade quickly, as would natural or organic materials. The largest single type of plastic pollution (~10%) and majority of large plastic in the oceans is discarded and lost nets from the fishing industry. Waterborne plastic poses a serious threat to fish, seabirds, marine reptiles, and marine mammals, as well as to boats and coasts.

Dumping, container spillages, litter washed into storm drains and waterways and wind-blown landfill waste all contribute to this problem. This increased water pollution has caused serious negative effects such as discarded fishing nets capturing animals, concentration of plastic debris in massive marine garbage patches, and increasing concentrations of contaminants in the food chain.

In efforts to prevent and mediate marine debris and pollutants, laws and policies have been adopted internationally, with the UN including reduced marine pollution in Sustainable Development Goal 14 "Life Below Water". Depending on relevance to the issues and various levels of contribution, some countries have introduced more specified protection policies. Moreover, some non-profits, NGOs, and government organizations are developing programs to collect and remove plastics from the ocean. However, in 2017 the UN estimated that by 2050 there will be more plastic than fish in the oceans if substantial measures are not taken.

== Types ==
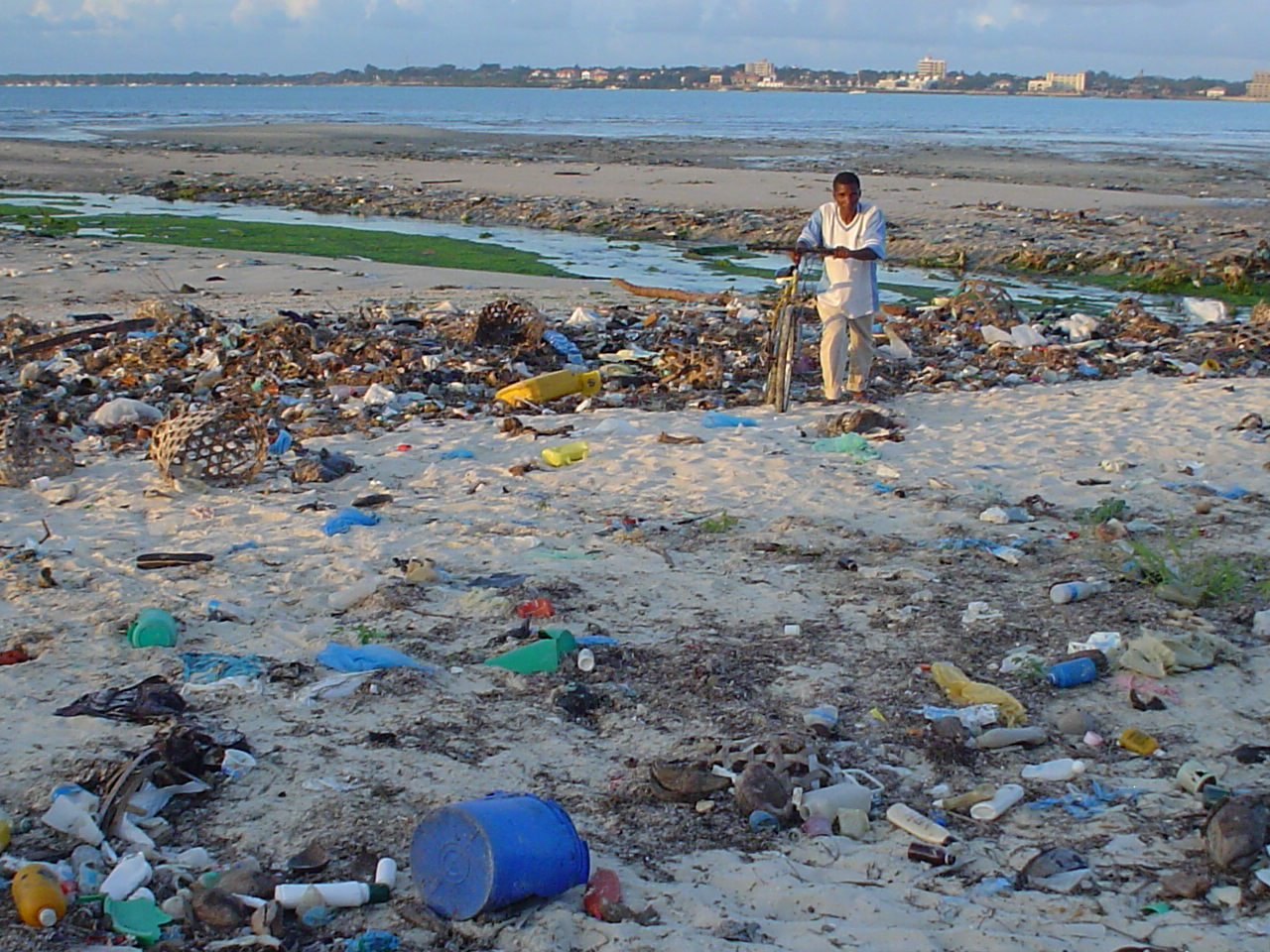
Debris on beach near Dar es Salaam, Tanzania

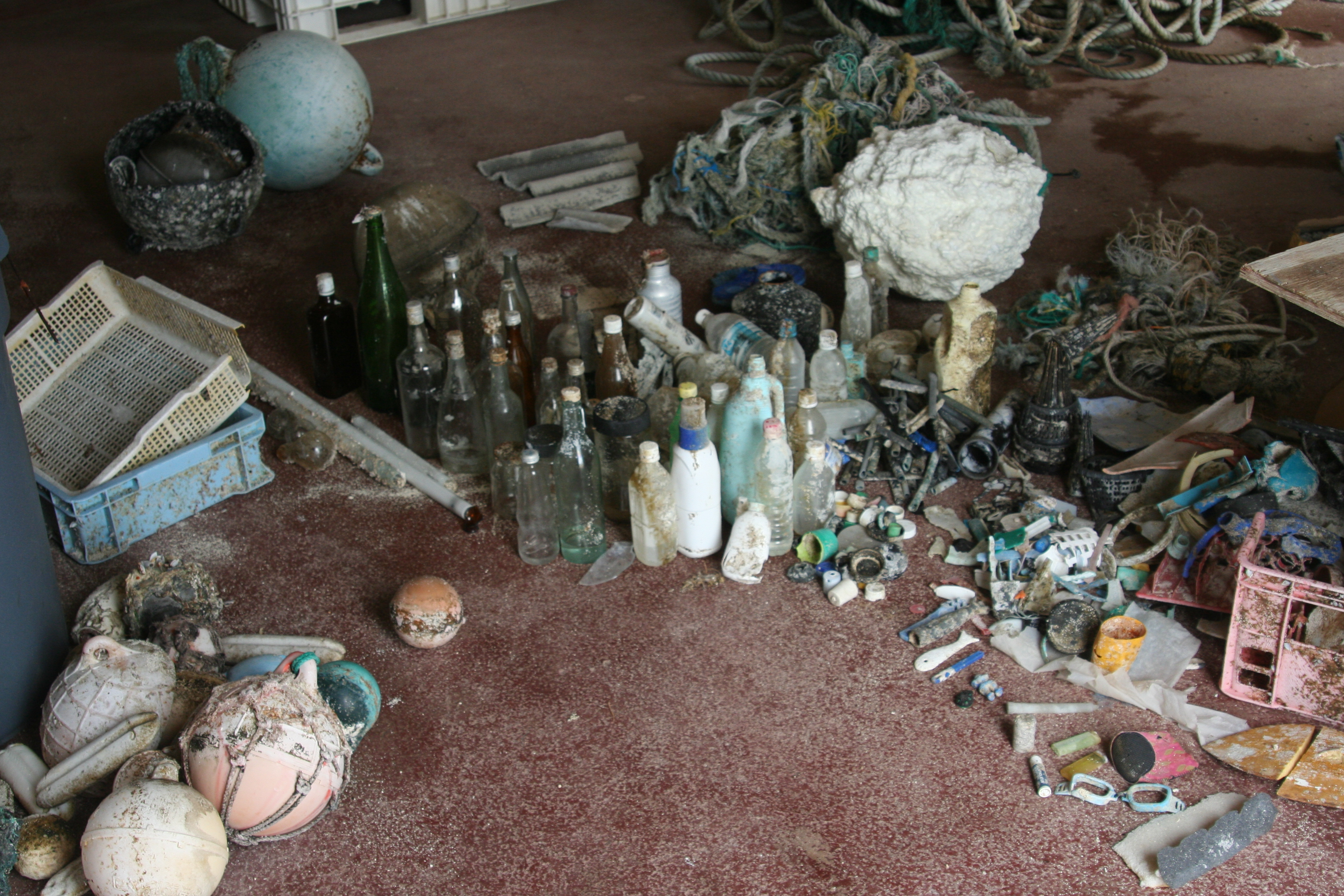
Debris collected from beaches on Tern Island in the French Frigate Shoals over one month

Researchers classify debris as either land- or ocean-based; in 1991, the United Nations Joint Group of Experts on the Scientific Aspects of Marine Pollution estimated that up to 80% of the pollution was land-based, with the remaining 20% originating from catastrophic events or maritime sources. More recent studies have found that more than half of plastic debris found on Korean shores is ocean-based.

A wide variety of man-made objects can become marine debris; plastic bags, balloons, buoys, rope, medical waste, glass and plastic bottles, cigarette stubs, cigarette lighters, beverage cans, polystyrene, lost fishing line and nets, and various wastes from cruise ships and oil rigs are among the items commonly found to have washed ashore. Six-pack rings, in particular, are considered emblematic of the problem.

The U.S. military used ocean dumping for unused weapons and bombs, including ordinary bombs, Unexploded ordnance (UXO), landmines and chemical weapons from at least 1919 until 1970. Millions of pounds of ordnance were disposed of in the Gulf of Mexico and off the coasts of at least 16 states, from New Jersey to Hawaii (although these, of course, do not wash up onshore, and the U.S. is not the only country who has practiced this).

Eighty percent of marine debris is plastic. Plastics accumulate because they typically do not biodegrade as many other substances do. They photodegrade on exposure to sunlight, although they do so only under dry conditions, as water inhibits photolysis. In a 2014 study using computer models, scientists from the group 5 Gyres, estimated 5.25 trillion pieces of plastic weighing 269,000 tons were dispersed in oceans in similar amount in the Northern and Southern Hemispheres.

=== Persistent industrial marine debris ===
Some materials and activities used in industrial activities that do not readily degrade, that persist in the environment, and tend to accumulate over time. The activities can include fishing, boating, and aquaculture industries that harvest or use resources in the marine environment and may lose or discard gear, materials, machinery or solid wastes from industrial processes into the water or onto shorelines. This can include anything as large as a fishing boat or as small as particle from a Styrofoam lobster float. In 2003, a study was conducted to identify types, amounts, sources, and effects of persistent industrial marine debris in the coastal waters and along the shores of Charlotte County, New Brunswick, and examine any relationship between the amount and types of persistent industrial marine debris, and the types and numbers of industrial operations nearby. Materials like plastic or foam can break down into smaller particles and may look like small sea creatures to wildlife such as birds, cetaceans, and fish, and they may eat these particles. Indigestible material may accumulate in the gut creating blockages or a false sense of fullness and eventually death from lack of appropriate nutrient intake.

=== Ghost nets ===
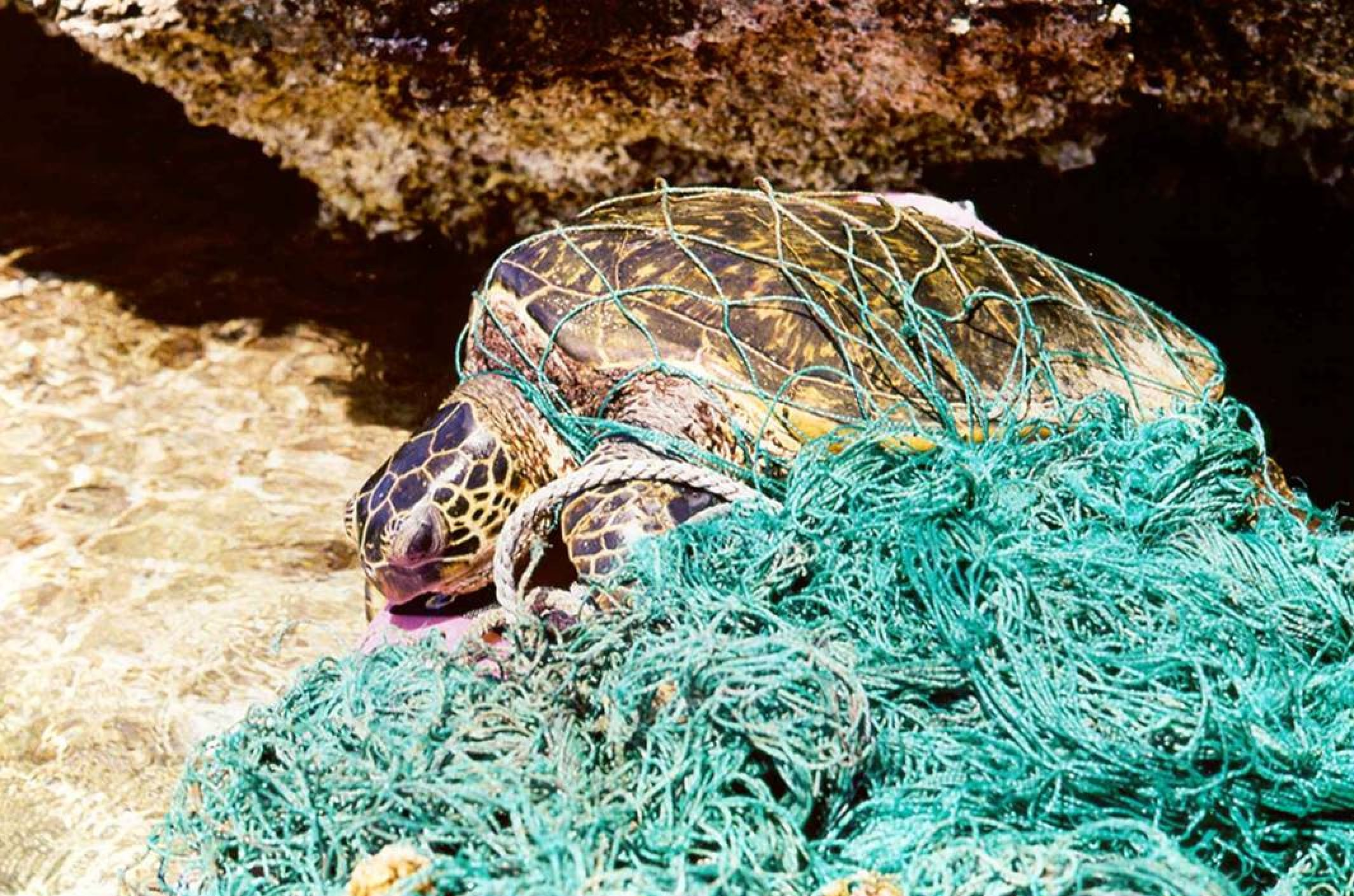
A sea turtle entangled in a ghost net.

Ghost nets are fishing nets that have been abandoned, lost, or otherwise discarded in the ocean, lakes, and rivers. These nets, often nearly invisible in the dim light, can be left tangled on a rocky reef or drifting in the open sea. They can entangle fish, dolphins, sea turtles, sharks, dugongs, crocodiles, seabirds, crabs, and other creatures, including the occasional human diver. Acting as designed, the nets restrict movement, causing starvation, laceration and infection, and suffocation in those that need to return to the surface to breathe. It is estimated that around 48-100 thousand tons of lost fishing gear is generated each year, not including those that were abandoned or discarded and these may linger in the oceans for a considerable time before breaking up.

=== Microplastics ===
A growing concern regarding plastic pollution in the marine ecosystem is the use of microplastics. Microplastics are beads of plastic less than 5 millimeters wide, and they are commonly found in hand soaps, face cleansers, and other exfoliators. When these products are used, the microplastics go through the water filtration system and into the ocean, but because of their small size they are likely to escape capture by the preliminary treatment screens on wastewater plants. These beads are harmful to the organisms in the ocean, especially filter feeders, because they can easily ingest the plastic and become sick. The microplastics are such a concern because it is difficult to clean them up due to their size, so humans can try to avoid using these harmful plastics by purchasing products that use environmentally safe exfoliates.

=== Deep-sea debris ===
Marine debris is found on the floor of the Arctic ocean. Although an increasing number of studies have been focused on plastic debris accumulation on the coasts, in off-shore surface waters, and that ingested by marine organisms that live in the upper levels of the water column, there is limited information on debris in the mesopelagic and deeper layers. Studies that have been done have conducted research through bottom sampling, video observation via remotely operated vehicles (ROVs), and submersibles. They are also mostly limited to one-off projects that do not extend long enough to show significant effects of deep-sea debris over time. Research thus far has shown that debris in the deep-ocean is in fact impacted by anthropogenic activities, and plastic has been frequently observed in the deep-sea, especially in areas off-shore of heavily populated regions, such as the Mediterranean.

Litter, made from diverse materials that are lighter than surface water (such as glasses, metals and some plastics), have been found to spread over the floor of seas and open oceans, where it can become entangled in corals and interfere with other sea-floor life, or even become buried under sediment, making clean-up extremely difficult, especially due to the wide area of its dispersal compared to shipwrecks. Plastics that are usually negatively buoyant can sink with the adherence of phytoplankton and the aggregation of other organic particles. Other oceanic processes that affect circulation, such as coastal storms and offshore convection, play a part in transferring large volumes of particles and debris. Submarine topographic features can also augment downwelling currents, leading to the retention of microplastics at certain locations.

A Deep-sea Debris database by the Global Oceanographic Data Center of the Japan Agency for Marine-Earth Science and Technology (JAMSTEC), showing thirty years of photos and samples of marine debris since 1983, was made public in 2017. From the 5,010 dives in the database, using both ROVs and deep-sea submersibles, 3,425 man-made debris items were counted. The two most significant types of debris were macro-plastic, making up 33% of the debris found – 89% of which was single-use – and metal, making up 26%. Plastic debris was found at the bottom of the Mariana Trench, at a depth of 10,898m, and plastic bags were found entangled in hydrothermal vent and cold seep communities.

=== Garbage patches (gyres) ===
A garbage patch is a gyre of marine debris particles caused by the effects of ocean currents and increasing plastic pollution by human populations. These human-caused collections of plastic and other debris are responsible for ecosystem and environmental problems that affect marine life, contaminate oceans with toxic chemicals, and contribute to greenhouse gas emissions. Once waterborne, marine debris becomes mobile. Flotsam can be blown by the wind, or follow the flow of ocean currents, often ending up in the middle of oceanic gyres where currents are weakest.

== Sources ==
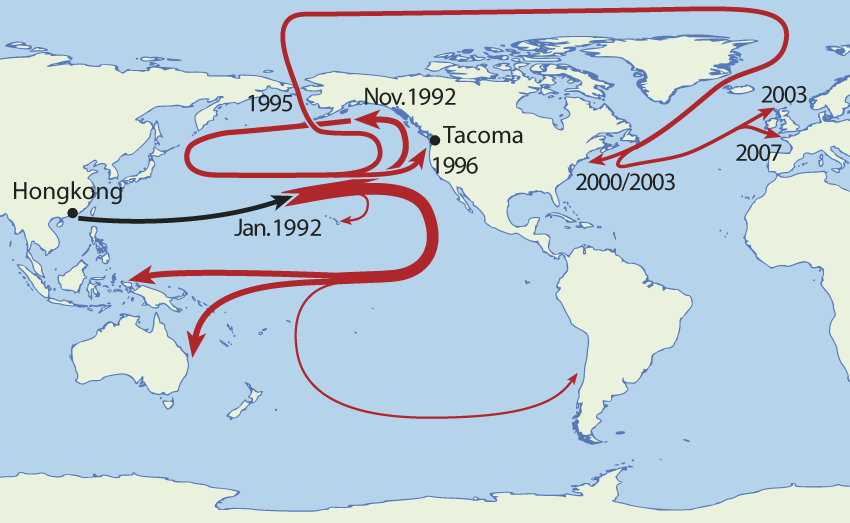
The travel of the Friendly Floatees

The 10 largest emitters of oceanic plastic pollution worldwide are, from the most to the least, China, Indonesia, Philippines, Vietnam, Sri Lanka, Thailand, Egypt, Malaysia, Nigeria, and Bangladesh, largely through the rivers Yangtze, Indus, Yellow, Hai, Nile, Ganges, Pearl, Amur, Niger, and the Mekong, and accounting for "90 percent of all the plastic that reaches the world's oceans."

An estimated 10,000 containers at sea each year are lost by container ships, usually during storms. One spillage occurred in the Pacific Ocean in 1992, when thousands of rubber ducks and other toys (now known as the "Friendly Floatees") went overboard during a storm. The toys have since been found all over the world, providing a better understanding of ocean currents. Similar incidents have happened before, such as when Hansa Carrier dropped 21 containers (with one notably containing buoyant Nike shoes).

In 2007, MSC Napoli beached in the English Channel, dropping hundreds of containers, most of which washed up on the Jurassic Coast, a World Heritage Site. A 2021 study following a 2014 loss of a container carrying printer cartridges calculated that some cartridges had dispersed at an average speed of between 6 cm and 13 cm per second. A 1997 accident of Tokio Express ship off the British coast resulted in loss of cargo container holding 5 million Lego pieces. Some of the pieces became valued among collectors who searched the beaches for Lego dragons. It also provided valuable insight in studying marine plastic degradation.

In Halifax Harbour, Nova Scotia, 52% of items were generated by recreational use of an urban park, 14% from sewage disposal and only 7% from shipping and fishing activities. Around four-fifths of oceanic debris is from rubbish blown onto the water from landfills, and urban runoff.

Some studies show that marine debris may be dominant in particular locations. For example, a 2016 study of Aruba found that debris found the windward side of the island was predominantly marine debris from distant sources. In 2013, debris from six beaches in Korea was collected and analyzed: 56% was found to be "ocean-based" and 44% "land-based".

In the 1987 Syringe Tide, medical waste washed ashore in New Jersey after having been blown from Fresh Kills Landfill. On the remote sub-Antarctic island of South Georgia, fishing-related debris, approximately 80% plastics, are responsible for the entanglement of large numbers of Antarctic fur seals.

Thirteen companies have an individual contribution of 1% or more of the total branded plastic observed in the audit events: The Coca-Cola Company, PepsiCo, Nestlé, Danone, Altria, Bakhresa Group, Wings, Unilever, Mayora Indah, Mondelez International, Mars, Incorporated, Salim Group, and British American Tobacco. All 13 companies produce food, beverage, or tobacco products. The top company, The Coca-Cola Company, was responsible for 11% (CI95% = 10 to 12%), significantly greater than any other company. The top 5 companies were responsible for 24% of the branded plastic; 56 companies were responsible for greater than 50% of the branded plastic; and 19,586 companies were responsible for all of the branded plastic. The contributions of the top companies may be an underestimation because there were brands that were not attributed to a company, and there were many unbranded objects.

== Environmental impacts ==
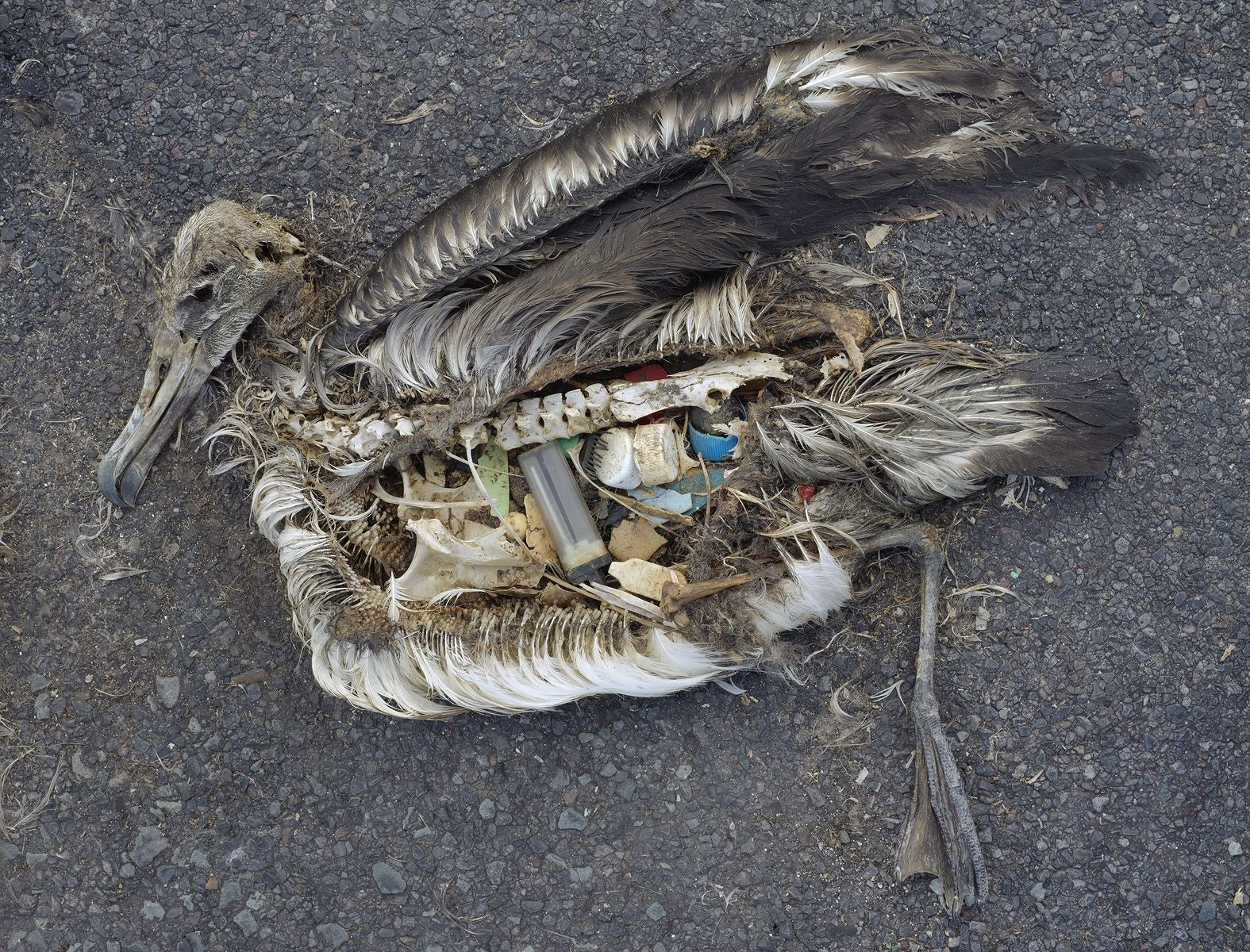
The remains of an albatross containing ingested flotsam.

Not all anthropogenic artifacts placed in the oceans are harmful. Iron and concrete structures typically do little damage to the environment because they generally sink to the bottom and become immobile, and at shallow depths they can even provide scaffolding for artificial reefs. Ships and subway cars have been deliberately sunk for that purpose.

Additionally, hermit crabs have been known to use pieces of beach litter as a shell when they cannot find an actual seashell of the size they need.

=== Impacts from plastic pollution ===
Many animals that live on or in the sea consume flotsam by mistake, as it often looks similar to their natural prey. Overall, 1288 marine species are known to ingest plastic debris, with fish making up the largest fraction. Bulky plastic debris may become permanently lodged in the digestive tracts of these animals, blocking the passage of food and causing death through starvation or infection. Tiny floating plastic particles also resemble zooplankton, which can lead filter feeders to consume them and cause them to enter the ocean food chain. In addition, plastic in the marine environment that contaminates the food chain can have repercussions on the viability of fish and shellfish species.

=== COVID-19 pandemic impacts ===
In Kenya, the COVID-19 pandemic has impacted the amount of marine debris found on beaches with around 55% being a pandemic-related trash items. Although the pandemic-related trash has shown up along the beaches of Kenya, it has not made its way into the water. The reduction of litter in the ocean could be a result of the closing of beaches and lack of movement during the pandemic, so less trash was likely to end up in the ocean. Additional impacts of the COVID-19 pandemic have been seen in Hong Kong, where disposable masks have ended up along the beaches of Soko's islands. This may be attributed to the increased production of medical products (masks and gloves) during the pandemic, leading to a rise in unconventional disposal of these products.

== Removal ==
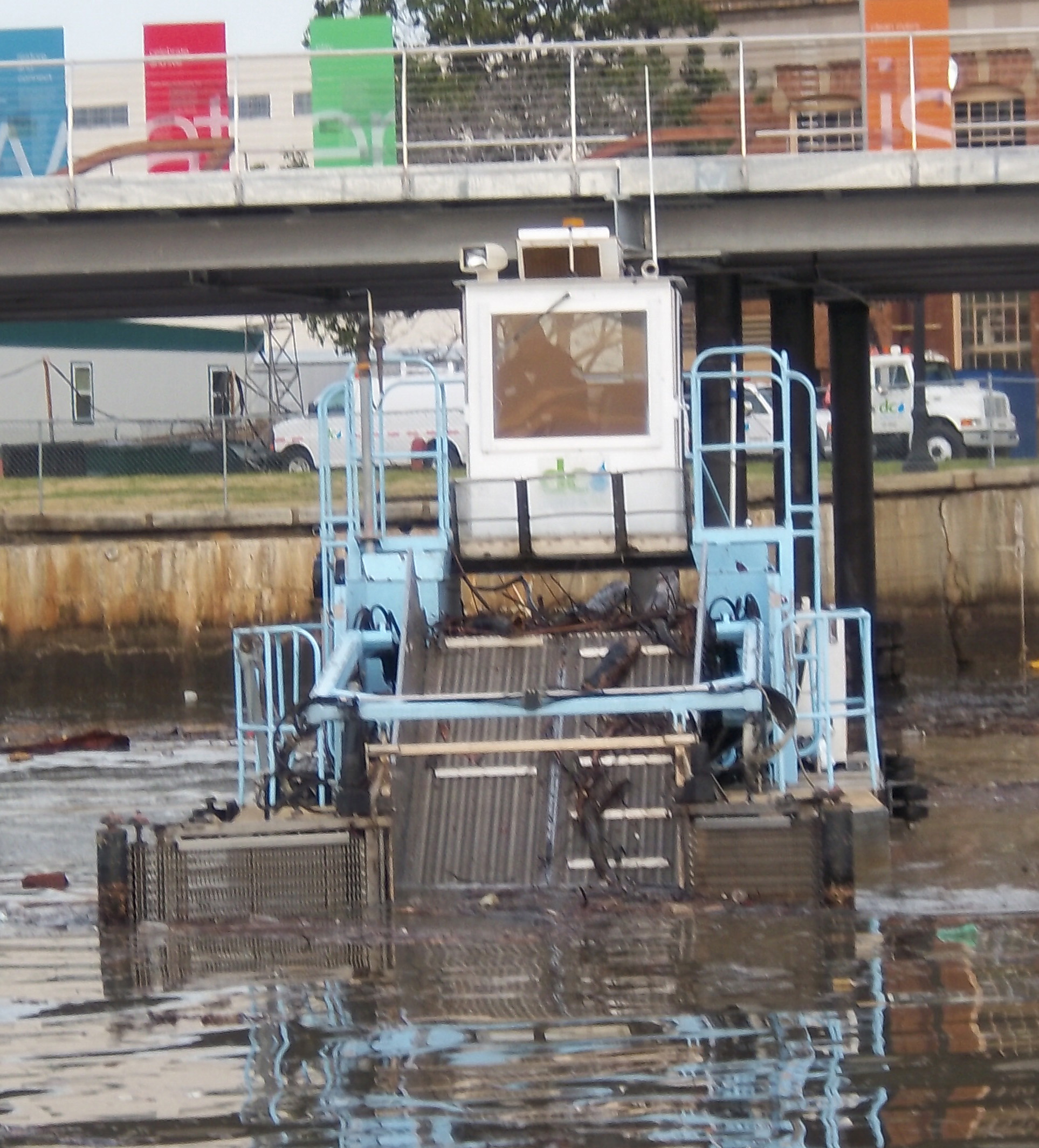
Skimmer boat used to remove floating debris and trash from the Potomac and Anacostia rivers

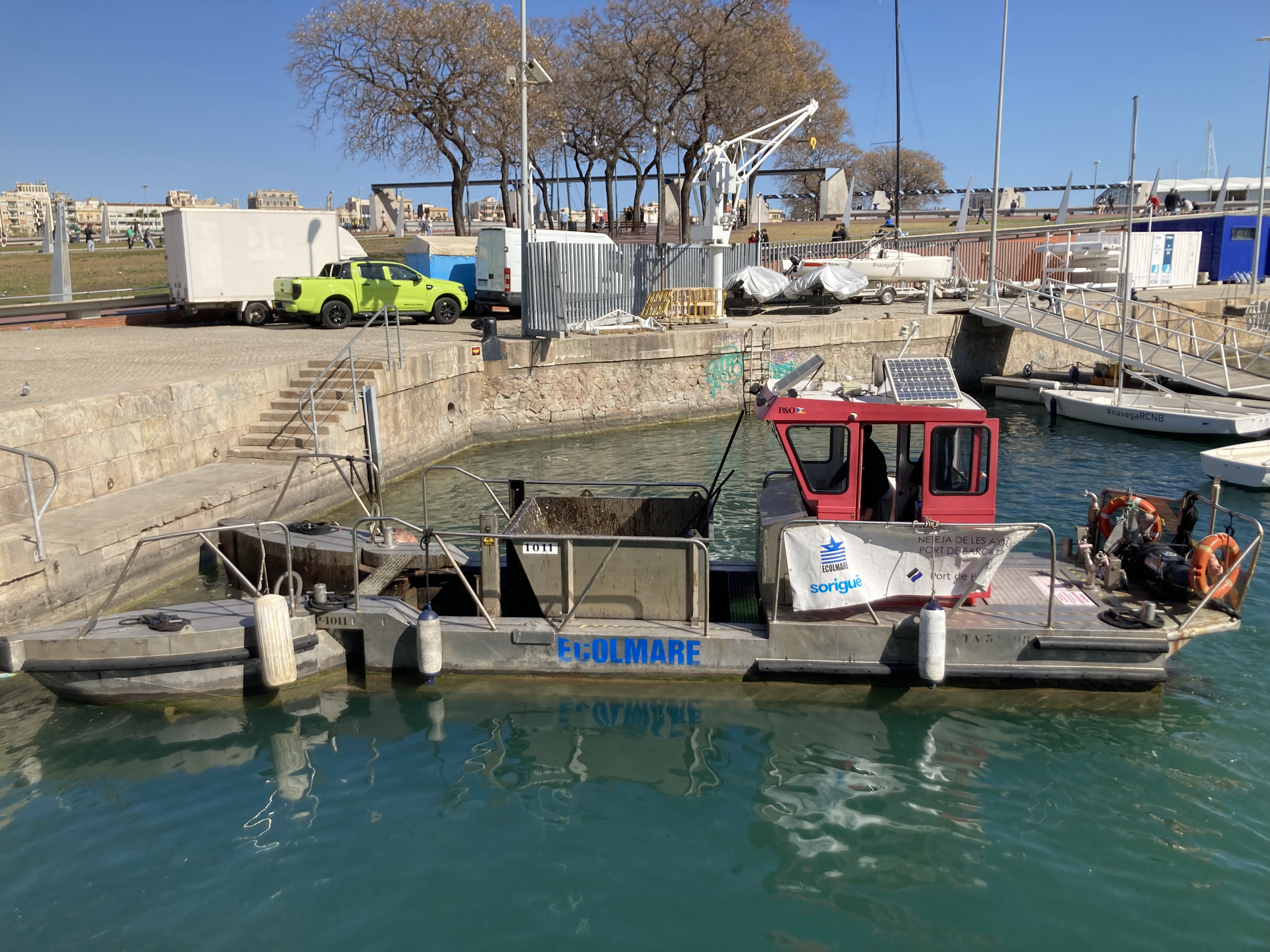
Debris skimmer boat in the Port of Barcelona

=== Coastal and river clean ups ===
Techniques for collecting and removing marine (or riverine) debris include the use of debris skimmer boats (pictured). Devices such as these can be used where floating debris presents a danger to navigation. For example, the US Army Corps of Engineers removes 90 tons of "drifting material" from San Francisco Bay every month. The Corps has been doing this work since 1942, when a seaplane carrying Admiral Chester W. Nimitz collided with a piece of floating debris and sank, costing the life of its pilot. The Ocean cleanup has also created a vessel for cleaning up riverine debris, called Interceptor. Once debris becomes "beach litter", collection by hand and specialized beach-cleaning machines are used to gather the debris.

There are also projects that stimulate fishing boats to remove any litter they accidentally fish up while fishing for fish.

Elsewhere, "trash traps" are installed on small rivers to capture waterborne debris before it reaches the sea. For example, South Australia's Adelaide operates a number of such traps, known as "trash racks" or "gross pollutant traps" on the Torrens River, which flows (during the wet season) into Gulf St Vincent.

In lakes or near the coast, manual removal can also be used. Project AWARE for example promotes the idea of letting dive clubs clean up litter, for example as a diving exercise.

Once a year there is a diving marine debris removal operation in Scapa Flow in Orkney, run by Ghost Fishing UK, funded by World Animal Protection and Fat Face Foundation.

Cleanup of marine debris can be stymied by inadequate collaboration across levels of government, and a patchwork of regulatory authorities (responsibility often differs for the ocean surface, the seabed, and the shore). For example, there are an estimated 1600 abandoned and derelict boats in the waters of British Columbia. In 2019 Canada's federal government passed legislation to make it illegal to abandon a vessel but enforcement is hampered because it is often difficult to determine who owns an abandoned boat since owners are not required to have a license – licensing is a provincial government responsibility. The Victoria-based non-profit Dead Boats Disposal Society notes that lack of enforcement means abandoned boats are often left to sink, which increases the cleanup cost and compounds the environmental hazard (due to seepage of fuel, oil, plastics, and other pollutants).

=== Mid-ocean clean ups ===
On the sea, the removal of artificial debris (i.e. plastics) is still in its infancy. However, some projects have been started which used ships with nets (Ocean Voyages Institute/Kaisei 2009 & 2010 and New Horizon 2009) to catch some plastics, primarily for research purposes. There is also Bluebird Marine System's SeaVax which was solar- and wind-powered and had an onboard shredder and cargo hold. The Sea Cleaners' Manta ship is similar in concept.

Another method to gather artificial litter has been proposed by The Ocean Cleanup's Boyan Slat. He suggested using platforms with arms to gather the debris, situated inside the current of gyres. The SAS Ocean Phoenix ship is somewhat similar in design.

In June 2019, Ocean Voyages Institute, conducted a cleanup utilizing GPS trackers and existing maritime equipment in the North Pacific Subtropical Convergence Zone setting the record for the largest mid-ocean cleanup accomplished in the North Pacific Gyre and removed over 84,000 pounds of polymer nets and consumer plastic trash from the ocean.

In May/June 2020, Ocean Voyages Institute conducted a cleanup expedition in the Gyre and set a new record for the largest mid-ocean cleanup accomplished in the North Pacific Gyre which removed over 170 tons (340,000 pounds) of consumer plastics and ghostnets from the ocean. Utilizing custom designed GPS satellite trackers which are deployed by vessels of opportunity, Ocean Voyages Institute is able to accurately track and send cleanup vessels to remove ghostnets. The GPS Tracker technology is being combined with satellite imagery increasing the ability to locate plastic trash and ghostnets in real time via satellite imagery which will greatly increase cleanup capacity and efficiency.

Another issue is that removing marine debris from the ocean can potentially cause more harm than good. Cleaning up microplastics could also accidentally take out plankton, which are the main lower level food group for the marine food chain and over half of the photosynthesis on earth. One of the most efficient and cost effective ways to help reduce the amount of plastic entering our oceans is to not participate in using single-use plastics, avoid plastic bottled drinks such as water bottles, use reusable shopping bags, and to buy products with reusable packaging.

== Laws and treaties ==
The ocean is a global common, so negative externalities of marine debris are not usually experienced by the producer. In the 1950s, the importance of government intervention with marine pollution protocol was recognized at the First Conference on the Law of the Sea.

Ocean dumping is controlled by international law, including:

- The London Convention (1972) – a United Nations agreement to control ocean dumping This Convention on the Prevention of Marine Pollution by Dumping of Wastes and Other Matter consisted of twenty two articles addressing expectations of contracting parties. The three annexes defined many compounds, substances, and materials that are unacceptable to deposit into the ocean. Examples of such matter include: mercury compounds, lead, cyanides, and radioactive wastes.
- MARPOL 73/78 – a convention designed to minimize pollution of the seas, including dumping, oil and exhaust pollution The original MARPOL convention did not consider dumping from ships, but was revised in 1978 to include restrictions on marine vessels.
- UNCLOS – signed in 1982, but effective in 1994, United Nations Convention on the Law of the Sea emphasized the importance of protecting the entire ocean and not only specified coastal regions. UNCLOS enforced restrictions on pollution, including a stress on land-based sources.

=== Australian law ===
One of the earliest anti-dumping laws was Australia's Beaches, Fishing Grounds and Sea Routes Protection Act 1932, which prohibited the discharge of "garbage, rubbish, ashes or organic refuse" from "any vessel in Australian waters" without prior written permission from the federal government. It also required permission for scuttling. The act was passed in response to large amounts of garbage washing up on the beaches of Sydney and Newcastle from vessels outside the reach of local governments and the New South Wales government. It was repealed and replaced by the Environment Protection (Sea Dumping) Act 1981, which gave effect to the London Convention.

=== European law ===
In 1972 and 1974, conventions were held in Oslo and Paris respectively, and resulted in the passing of the OSPAR Convention, an international treaty controlling marine pollution in the north-east Atlantic Ocean. The Barcelona Convention protects the Mediterranean Sea. The Water Framework Directive of 2000 is a European Union directive committing EU member states to free inland and coastal waters from human influence. In the United Kingdom, the Marine and Coastal Access Act 2009 is designed to "ensure clean healthy, safe, productive and biologically diverse oceans and seas, by putting in place better systems for delivering sustainable development of marine and coastal environment". In 2019, the EU parliament voted for an EU-wide ban on single-use plastic products such as plastic straws, cutlery, plates, and drink containers, polystyrene food and drink containers, plastic drink stirrers and plastic carrier bags and cotton buds. The law will take effect in 2021.

=== United States law ===
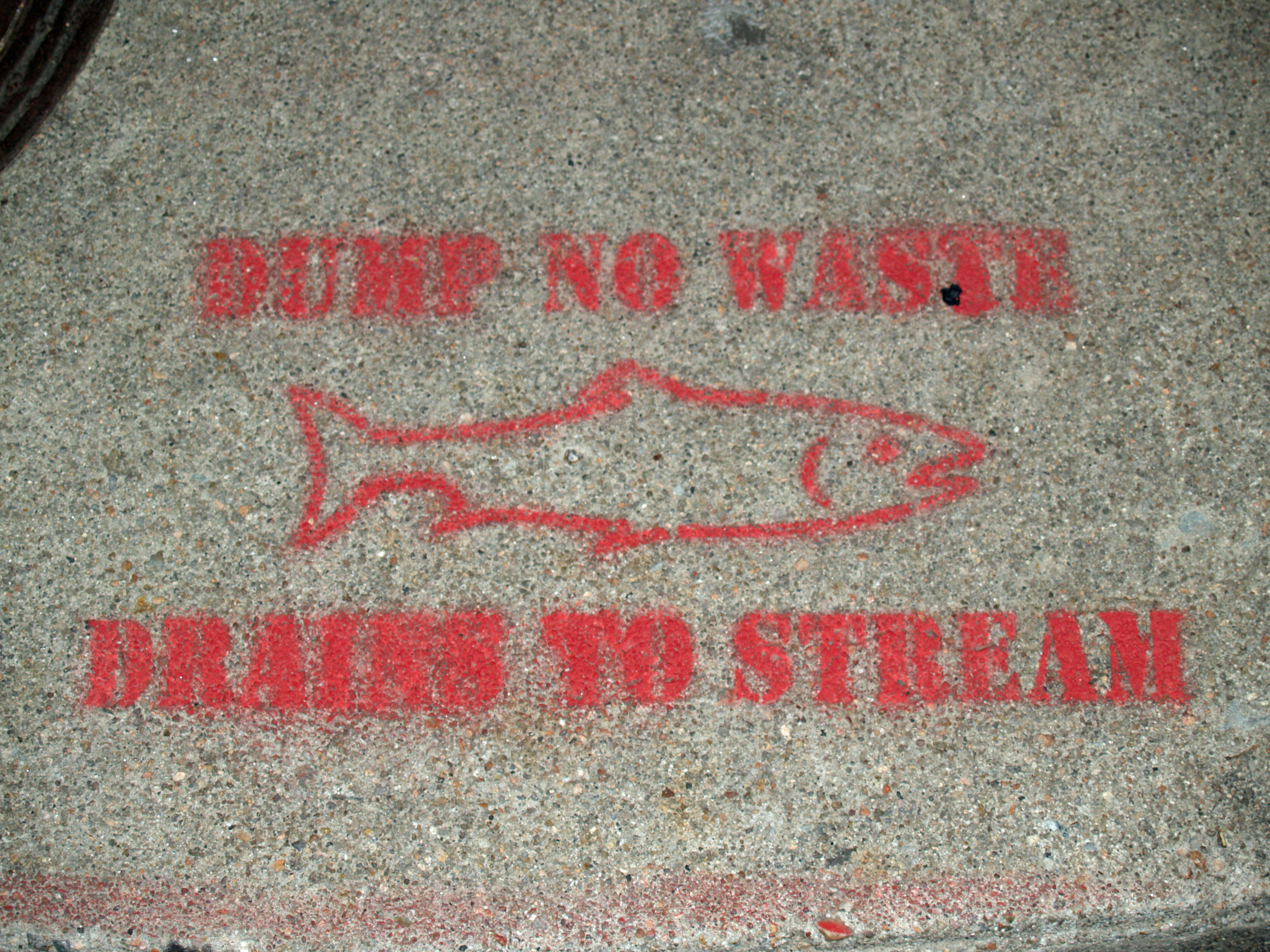
A sign above a storm drain in Colorado Springs warning people to not pollute the local stream by dumping. Eighty percent of marine debris reaches the sea via rivers.

In the waters of the United States, there have been many observed consequences of pollution including: hypoxic zones, harmful agal blooms, and threatened species. In 1972, the United States Congress passed the Ocean Dumping Act, giving the Environmental Protection Agency power to monitor and regulate the dumping of sewage sludge, industrial waste, radioactive waste and biohazardous materials into the nation's territorial waters. The Act was amended sixteen years later to include medical wastes. It is illegal to dispose of any plastic in US waters.

=== Ownership ===
Property law, admiralty law and the law of the sea may be of relevance when lost, mislaid, and abandoned property is found at sea. Salvage law rewards salvors for risking life and property to rescue the property of another from peril. On land the distinction between deliberate and accidental loss led to the concept of a "treasure trove". In the United Kingdom, shipwrecked goods should be reported to a Receiver of Wreck, and if identifiable, they should be returned to their rightful owner.

== Activism ==
A large number of groups and individuals are active in preventing or educating about marine debris. For example, 5 Gyres is an organization aimed at reducing plastics pollution in the oceans, and was one of two organizations that recently researched the Great Pacific Garbage Patch. Heal the Bay is another organization, focusing on protecting California's Santa Monica Bay, by sponsoring beach cleanup programs along with other activities. Marina DeBris is an artist focusing most of her recent work on educating people about beach trash. Interactive sites like Adrift demonstrate where marine plastic is carried, over time, on the worlds ocean currents.

On 11 April 2013 in order to create awareness, artist Maria Cristina Finucci founded the Garbage Patch State at UNESCO –Paris in front of Director General Irina Bokova. First of a series of events under the patronage of UNESCO and of Italian Ministry of the Environment.

Forty-eight plastics manufacturers from 25 countries, are members of the Global Plastic Associations for solutions on Marine Litter, have made the pledge to help prevent marine debris and to encourage recycling.

=== Mitigation ===
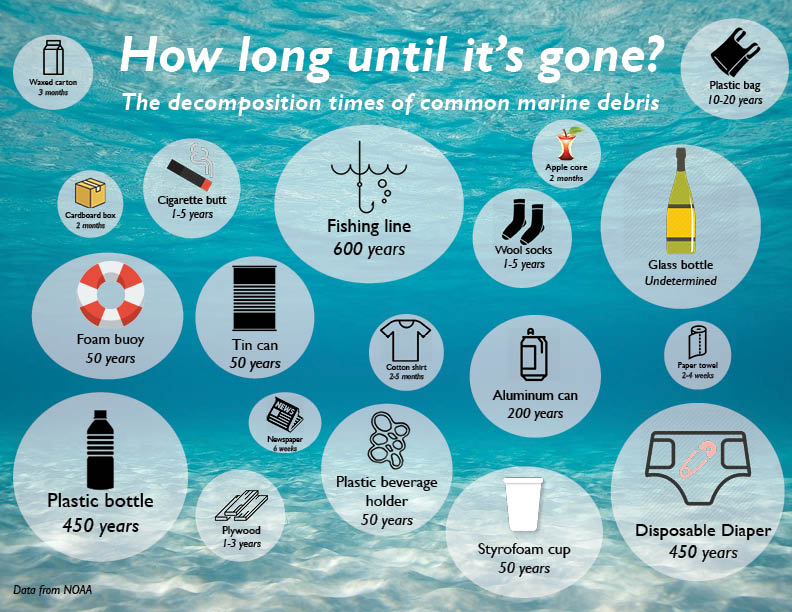
The decomposition times of marine debris

Marine debris is a widespread problem, not only the result of activities in coastal regions.

Plastic debris from inland states come from two main sources: ordinary litter and materials from open dumps and landfills that blow or wash away to inland waterways and wastewater outflows. The refuse finds its way from inland waterways, rivers, streams and lakes to the ocean. Though ocean and coastal area cleanups are important, it is crucial to address plastic waste that originates from inland and landlocked states.

At the systems level, there are various ways to reduce the amount of debris entering our waterways:

- Improve waste transportation to and from sites by utilizing closed container storage and shipping
- Restrict open waste facilities near waterways
- Promote the use of refuse-derived fuels. Used plastic with low residual value often does not get recycled and is more likely to leak into the ocean. However, turning these unwanted plastics that would otherwise stay in landfills into refuse-derived fuels allows for further use; they can be used as supplement fuels at power plants
- Improve recovery rates for plastic (in 2012, the United States generated 11.46 million tons of plastic waste, of which only 6.7% was recovered
- Adapt Extended Producer Responsibility strategies to make producers responsible for product management when products and their packaging become waste; encourage reusable product design to minimize negative impacts on the environment.
- Ban the use of cigarette filters and establish a deposit-system for e-cigarettes (similar to the one used for propane canisters)

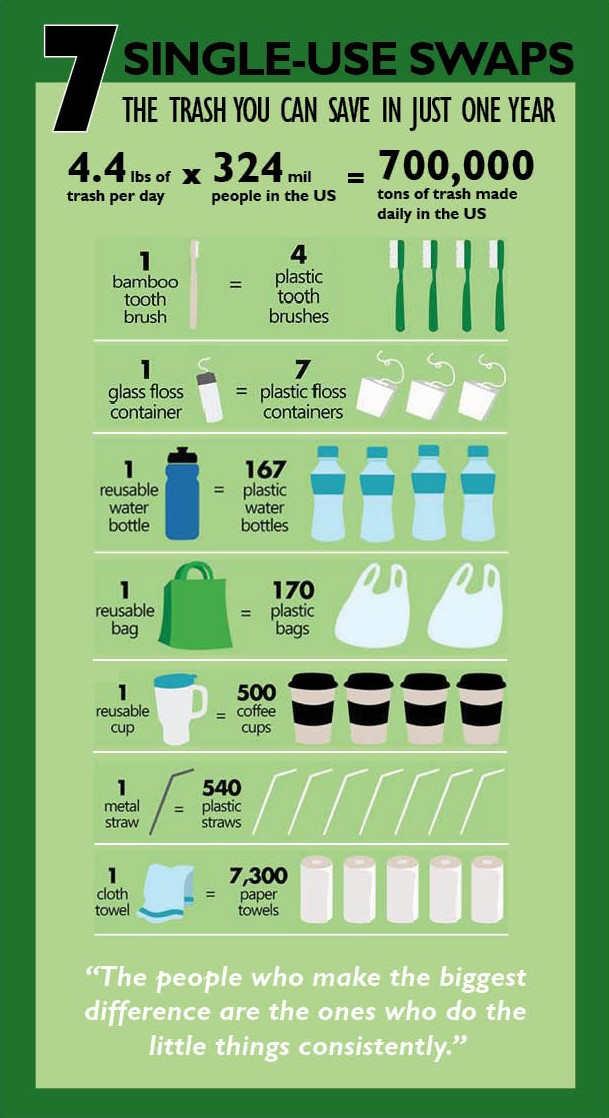
Seven simple single-use swaps people can make to save trash

Consumers can help to reduce the amount of plastic entering waterways by reducing usage of single-use plastics, avoiding microbeads, participate in a river or lake beach cleanup.

== See also ==
- Citizen Science
- Flotsam and jetsam
- Kamilo Beach
- Marina DeBris – Pseudonymous Australian artist who works with trash from oceans and beaches
- Marine pollution
- National Cleanup Day
- Plastic pollution
- Plastic-eating organisms
- Plastitar
- Prevented Ocean Plastic
- Project Kaisei
- Waste management
- World Cleanup Day
