= SUPER HI-CAT =

Research cruise in the Pacific Ocean

C-MORE: SUPER HI-CAT (Center for Microbial Oceanography- Research and Education: Survey of Underwater Plastic Ecosystem Response Hawaii to California Transit)

The SUPER HI-CAT research cruise was the first effort to study the microbial communities and the biogeochemistry associated with the Great Pacific Garbage Patch.[1] The study was conducted aboard the RV Kilo Moana (T-AGOR-26) between August 25, 2008 and September 5, 2008 by researchers from University of Hawaiʻi at Mānoa, Oregon State University, and the Algalita Marine Research Foundation.

Previous research on the Plastic Patch had mostly focused on the effects of the plastic pieces on jellyfish, fish, sea turtles, and seabirds. Relatively little was known about how this type of marine debris would affect the microbial communities that make up 98% of the biomass in the ocean and control oceanic biogeochemistry. During this cruise, 30 sites were sampled. At 15 of these sites, a modified surface net called a manta trawl was used to collect plastic pieces, while water samples were collected from the upper 200 meters of the ocean. At the other 15 stations, only the surface waters were sampled. This study will allow researchers to begin to determine whether biofilms are forming on the plastic particles, whether the microbes living on the particles are different from the free-living planktonic organisms, and what effect these communities might have on the oceanic carbon cycle and nitrogen cycle.

== See also ==
- Project Kaisei
