= Ocean Recovery Alliance =

- Abbreviation: ORA
- Formation: 2010
- Purpose: Marine conservation
- Headquarters: Hong Kong
- Location: Hong Kong, California
- Managing Director: Douglas Woodring
- Board of Directors: Ashley Day, Dr. Ali Beba, Dr. Calum McKinlay, Dr. James Leichter
- Website: www.oceanrecov.org

Ocean Recovery Alliance (ORA) is a 501c3 registered non-profit organization in California, and a registered charitable organization in Hong Kong, with the aim to use new technologies, innovations, creativity and collaborations to solve issues that face the health of the ocean today.

== Foundation ==
Ocean Recovery Alliance was founded by Douglas Woodring and Ashley Day in 2010. Doug, currently Managing Director of Ocean Recovery Alliance, also co-founded Project Kaisei in 2009, which led a science expedition to the North Pacific Gyre with Scripps Institution of Oceanography.

The United Nations Environment Programme (UNEP) listed plastic pollution in the ocean as the first of three main focal points in their 2011 UNEP Yearbook, indicating the necessity of addressing how we use and dispose of plastics. One of the causes of plastic pollution is that so many of our disposable, single-use products, are made with a permanent material - plastic. With the growth of our "disposable" lifestyles has come a growing burden on communities and governments whose waste management and recycling infrastructures have not been able to keep pace with our consumption patterns and waste generation. Ocean Recovery Alliance is working on ways to combat this issue through the following projects:

== Projects ==
The group is an umbrella organization which operates and organizes a variety of sub-projects related to the reduction of plastic pollution, ocean conservation, and general awareness about the value of our waters. Two of the projects within the group were announced at the Clinton Global Initiative (CGI) in 2010, and are focused on innovative prevention programs for plastic waste reduction. This includes the Plastic Disclosure Project, and the Global Alert platform. Ocean Recovery Alliance is also a founding member of the Ocean Conservancy’s “Trash Free Seas Alliance” which was announced at the Clinton Global Initiative in 2011.

On June 21, 2012, Ocean Recovery Alliance hosted a side event Plasticity Forum Rio, at the RIO+20 Earth Summit.

The Tsunami Debris Tracking Project was the first project to place satellite tracking buoys to follow some of the debris flow in the south west part of the plume that was generated from the 2011 Tohoku earthquake and tsunami.

Together with Wallem Group and Anglo Eastern, Ocean Recovery Alliance installed acoustic equipment to bring awareness and enhanced science observations for the endangered Chinese white dolphin.

Ocean Recovery Alliance, in association with Flynn Consulting, published a bilingual book titled Water Margin: Hong Kong's Link to the Sea. This book, which features images and stories from Hong Kong's unique aquatic environment, will be distributed free to over 700 local schools in Hong Kong.

In April 2012, Ocean Recovery Alliance organized Asia's first ocean film festival, in association with the San Francisco Ocean Film Festival HK-SF Ocean Film Festival.

In September 2012, Ocean Recovery Alliance organized Kids Ocean Day HK.

To celebrate World Oceans Day each June 8, Ocean Recovery Alliance encourages surfers, sailors, swimmers, divers and paddlers to organize ocean cleanups to give back to the environment they use for recreation.

Ocean Recovery Alliance offers educational Junk Trips for companies or schools. Groups will have hands-on experience trawling for plastic debris on the west side of Hong Kong and learn about what plastic pollution means to Hong Kong and what we can do to make a difference.

In response to an unusual inundation of marine trash in 2016, ORA organized a human art piece and protest "Trashzilla" in November 2016.

Grate Art project: As part of an educational awareness campaign about the link between drains and the ocean, artistic ceramic tiles with environmental messages have been installed near sewage grates.

== Publications ==
Flynn, Matthew and Ocean Recovery Alliance (2012) Water Margin: Hong Kong's Link to the Sea, Hong Kong SAR.

== Related ==
Co-founder Ashley Day is currently CEO and founder of Vor-Tek Recovery Solutions, a company based in Southern California that is focused on new technology development and recovery methods for marine based applications suited for oil spill and marine plastics recovery. His oil spill recovery technology was selected as one of the top 10 finalists out of over 350 applicants in the Wendy Schmidt Oil Cleanup X CHALLENGE.
