= Kaisei (ship) =

Japanese brigantine built in 1990

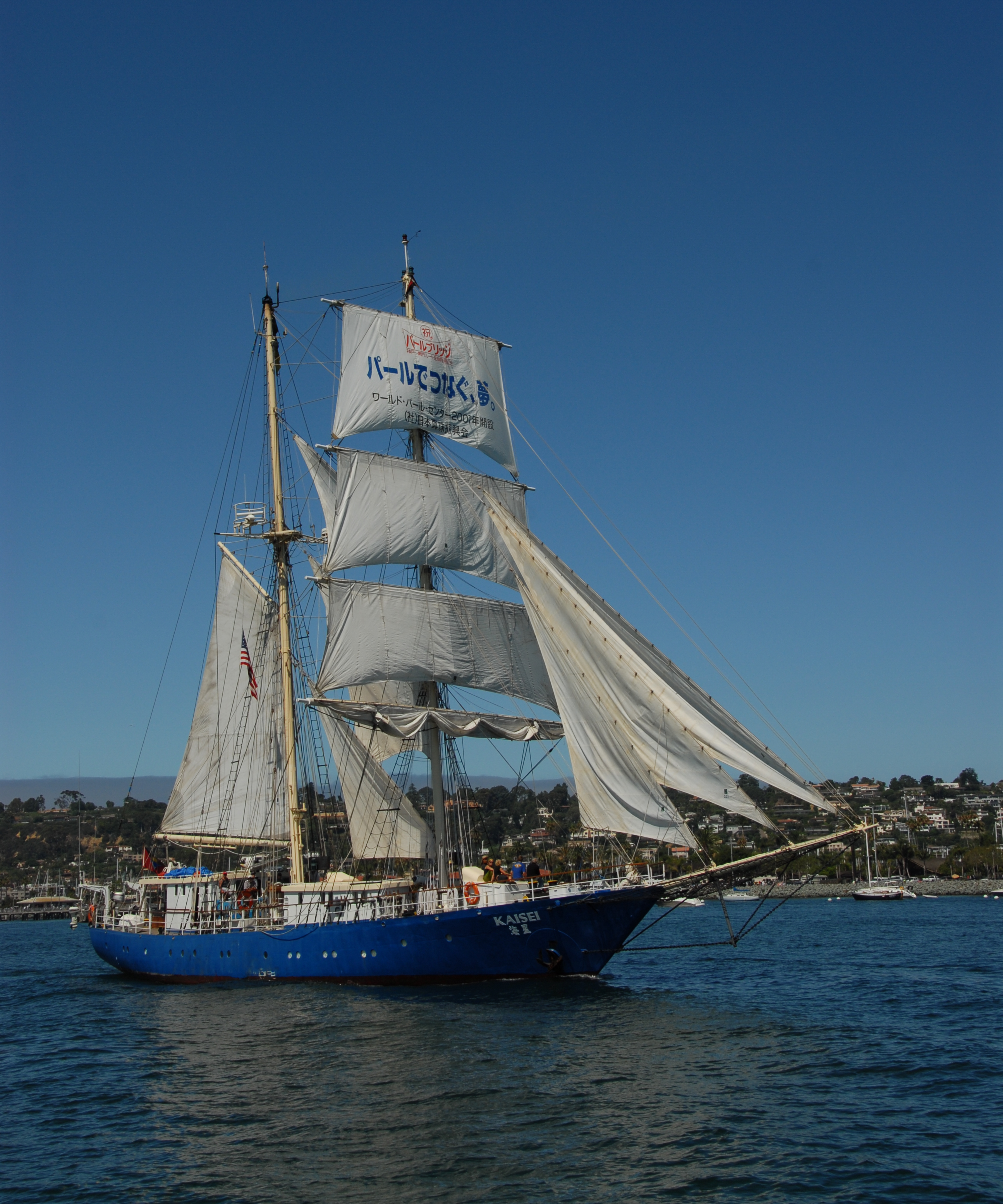
- Kaisei at the Festival of Sail 2008, San Diego, California

History
- Name: Kaisei
- Port of registry: St. John's, Antigua
- Builder: Interster Elbląg Shipyard, Elbląg, Poland
- Launched: 1987
- Homeport: Alameda, California since 2020
- Identification: IMO number: 8859366
- Status: Sunk

General characteristics
- Type: Brigantine
- Displacement: 180 long tons (183 t)
- Length: 151 ft (46 m) sparred
- Beam: 25 ft (7.6 m)
- Draft: 13 ft (4.0 m)
- Sail plan: 8,500 sq ft (790 m^{2}) of sails

STS Kaisei (海星), meaning “Sea Star” in the Japanese language, is a steel-hulled brigantine designed by Polish naval architect Ryszard Langer. It was built as a schooner in Elbląg, Poland in 1987. After re-rigging it is now a two-masted vessel, square rigged on the foremast, with fore-and-aft sails on the mainmast.

== History ==
Originally commissioned by the Polish Yachting Association as the Zew, she was acquired by the Sail Training Association of Japan (STAJ) and delivered to Japan via the Panama Canal in 1993 following a 16-month maiden voyage under the United Nations flag in which she saw 100-knot (190 km/h; 120 mph) winds off the coast of Scotland and participated in the American Tall Ship Celebration in 1992.

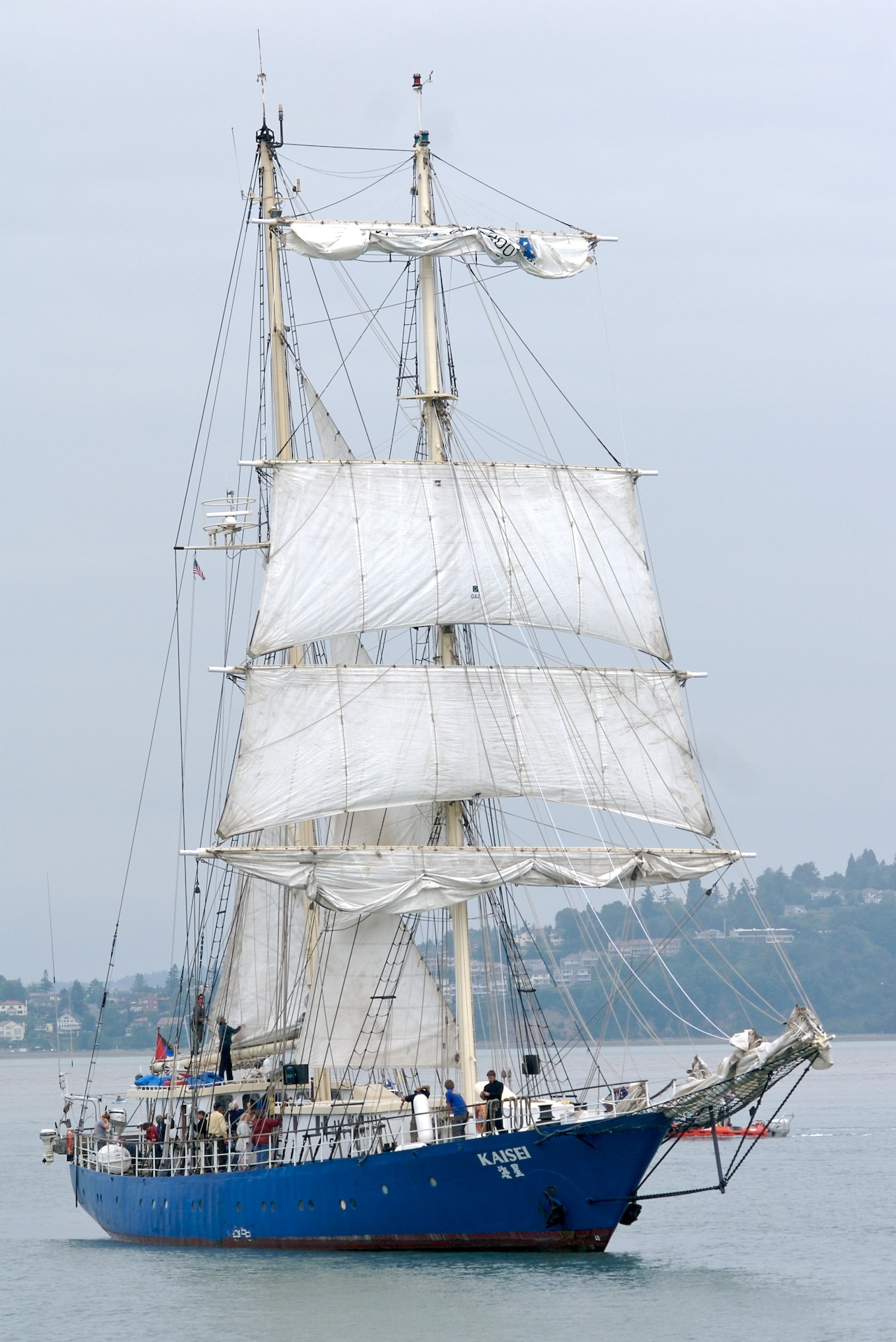
Kaisei stowing her sails in preparation for docking.

=== Trips ===
Under the Japanese flag, she visited 15 countries and traveled extensively throughout the Pacific in her mission to promote the global community and bring countries and cultures together through the international language of the sea. She has covered roughly 40,000 nautical miles (around 80,000 km).

In 1992 she sailed with the Columbus fleet, flying the UN flag. Kaisei's maiden voyage lasted 16 months throughout Europe, East Coast US, Caribbean, Panama Canal, West Coast US and Pacific Islands covering 57,000 km. During this time period, the vessel flew the United Nations flag. Under Japanese flag she traveled throughout the Pacific and Asia and carried over 10,000 trainees during the 14-year period.

=== Ocean Voyages Institute ===
Ocean Voyages Institute, a California 501(c) 3 organization, currently operates the vessel. She serves as the figurehead and expedition ship of "Project Kaisei," which is an international program dedicated to implementing solutions to the problem of marine debris.

In August 2009, Kaisei embarked from San Francisco on a month-long voyage for the Ocean Voyages Institute as part of "Project Kaisei". This voyage was to study the Great Pacific Garbage Patch. She returned again in 2010 to the North Pacific Gyre and also took part in a variety of educational and awareness events.

On May 25, 2025, she sank at her dock at the Alameda Harbor in Alameda, California. The cause is under investigation.
