= Center for Microbial Oceanography: Research and Education =

Research and education organization

The Center for Microbial Oceanography (C-MORE) is a research and education organization established in 2006 as a National Science Foundation funded Science and Technology Center.

== Objectives ==
It has been said that more is known about the surface of the Moon than about the Earth's oceans. C-MORE was designed to explore the largely unknown world of microorganisms in the sea and to educate the public and other scientists about these organisms. The motto of the center is "From genomes to biomes", meaning that the researchers want to look at how the diversity of microbes in the ocean influences the structure and function of the world's largest biome, the ocean.

== Background ==
The center was initially proposed, and is now directed by Professor David Karl, of the University of Hawaiʻi at Mānoa. C-MORE has affiliated researchers working at the Massachusetts Institute of Technology, the Monterey Bay Aquarium Research Institute, Oregon State University, the University of California, Santa Cruz, the Woods Hole Oceanographic Institution, and the University of Hawaiʻi at Mānoa. C-MORE is the only one of NSF’s 17 Science and Technology Centers that focuses on microbial oceanography.

== Research ==
C-MORE scientists want to understand biological processes that begin at microscopic scales and are expressed in vitally significant issues such as climate change. Areas of research range from genomic surveys, to studies of the genetic basis of marine microbial biogeochemistry to building ecosystem models. One of the strengths of the Center is its seagoing capability, as well as the long term studies that have been conducted by the Hawaii Ocean Time-series (HOT) Program in the North Pacific Subtropical Gyre. In addition to extensive laboratory experimentation, C-MORE also stages cruises to examine marine microbes in their environment. One example was the SUPER HI-CAT cruise, which was the first effort to study the microbiology associated with the plastic particles in the Great Pacific Garbage Patch.

== Education ==
C-MORE is active in increasing scientific literacy about microbial oceanography among the general population, as well as training microbial oceanographers. C-MORE has undergraduate internships as well as a summer graduate training course (the Agouron Course). C-MORE also provides resources for K-12 educators, such as training workshops, science kits, and a teacher at sea program.
