= Project Kaisei =

Project to study and clean up the Great Pacific Garbage Patch

- Project Kaisei logo
- Formation: 19 March 2009
- Type: NGO
- Purpose: Environmental
- Co-Founders: Doug Woodring, Mary Crowley, George Orbelian
- Parent organization: Ocean Voyages Institute
- Website: http://www.projectkaisei.org/

Project Kaisei (from 海星, kaisei, "ocean planet" in Japanese) is a scientific and commercial mission to study and clean up the Great Pacific Garbage Patch, a large body of floating plastic and marine debris trapped in the Pacific Ocean by the currents of the North Pacific Gyre. Discovered by NOAA, and publicized by Captain Charles Moore, the patch is estimated to contain 20 times the density of floating debris compared to the global average. The project aims to study the types, extent, and nature of the debris with a view to identifying the scope of the problem and its effects on the ocean biome as well as ways of capturing, detoxifying, and recycling the material. It was organized by the Ocean Voyages Institute, a California-based 501c3 non-profit organisation dealing with marine preservation. The project is based in San Francisco and Hong Kong.

== History ==
Project Kaisei was started in late 2008 by Mary Crowley, owner of Ocean Voyages, Inc., a for-profit yacht brokerage, Doug Woodring, and George Orbelian, from the San Francisco Bay Area, all with many years of experience in ocean stewardship and activities. As ocean lovers, Mary being a long time sailor, George being a surfer, expert on surfboard design, Author of Essential Surfing, and carries on the work of Project Kaisei by sitting on the boards of the Walter Munk Foundation For The Oceans and the Buckminster Fuller Institute as well as connections to the Gump Research Station For Coral Reefs – Moorea, Tahiti. Doug Woodring has backgrounds in business, finance, innovative technology and media maintains his passion for open water swimming and paddling racing. Each had different contacts, networks and abilities to contribute to the group. With Doug living in Hong Kong, the group set up two points of operation on either side of the Pacific (San Francisco and Hong Kong) to bring global attention and relevant stakeholders together to stem the flow of plastic and marine debris into our ocean. Doug carries on the work with the strategic planning developed for Project Kaisei by James Gollub: The Ocean Recovery Alliance and The Plastics Disclosure Project.

== Project goals ==
The project launched on 19 March 2009, with plans for an initial phase of scientific study of plastic marine debris in the North Pacific Gyre and various feasibility studies of the effects to life, size, location, depths, approaches to potential recovery and recycling technologies. The goal is to bring about a global collaboration of science, technology, and solutions, to help remove the waste and restore the health of the ocean biome. New catch methods for the debris are being studied, which would have low energy input and low marine life loss. Technologies for remediation or recycling are being evaluated, to potentially create secondary products from the waste, which in turn could help subsidize a larger scale cleanup. The project has completed two expeditions, one in the summer of 2009, and one in 2010. New data on the issue has been collected, and more research and planning needs to be done in order to understand the metrics, effectiveness and costs associated with a larger scale cleanup effort. Planning is now taking place for future research and expeditions which would allow the testing of new capture technologies and equipment, as well as the demonstration of remediation or recycling technologies.

== Initial voyage ==
In August 2009, the initial study and feasibility voyage phase of Project Kaisei began, conducted by two vessels, the 53-metre (174-foot) diesel-powered research vessel R/V New Horizon, and the project flagship, the 46 m (150 ft) tall ship Kaisei. The New Horizon, owned by the Scripps Institution of Oceanography, left San Diego on 2 August 2009 on the Scripps Environmental Accumulation of Plastic Expedition (SEAPLEX), set to last until 21 August. The SEAPLEX expedition is funded by the University of California, San Diego, the National Science Foundation with supplemental funding from Project Kaisei. Two days later the Kaisei departed San Francisco on 4 August, and was expected to undertake a 30-day voyage. The Kaisei was to investigate the size and concentration of the debris field, and explore retrieval methods, while the New Horizon would join her and study the effect of the debris field on marine life. Both vessels carried Apple iPhones outfitted with Voyage Tracker apps built by Ojingo Labs that allowed researchers to share videos and photos from the expedition in real time, an innovation that brought the world along with the researchers and resulted in Google Earth Hero recognition of the project.

=== Intensive sampling ===
On reaching the patch, 1,900 kilometres (1,000 nautical miles) from the Californian coast, New Horizon began intensive sampling on 9 August. The crew took samples every few hours around the clock, using nets of various sizes and collecting samples at various depths. New Horizon returned on Friday 21, August 2009. SEAPLEX reported their initial findings on Thursday 27, August 2009, declaring that the patch stretched across at least 3,100 km (1,700 nmi). Plastic was found in every one of the 100 consecutive surface samples gathered. Miriam Goldstein, chief scientist of the SEAPLEX expedition described the findings as "shocking". Speaking about the patch, Goldstein added, "There’s no island, there’s no eighth continent, it doesn’t look like a garbage dump. It looks like beautiful ocean. But then when you put the nets in the water, you see all the little pieces".

=== Return ===
Kaisei returned to San Francisco on the morning of Monday 31 August. OVI founder and Project Kaisei co-founder Mary Crowley stated immediately following the Kaisei expeditions that the pollution was "what we expected to see, or a little worse." Andrea Neal, principal investigator on the Kaisei speaking on Tuesday 1 September stated that "Marine debris is the new man-made epidemic. It's that serious". Kaisei and New Horizon together had conducted tests over 6,500 km (3,500 nmi) of the ocean.

Initial findings from the voyages confirmed that the vast majority of the debris is small. The tiny portions of the debris field was said to be pervasive, and was found both at the surface and at numerous depths. It was also described as a "nearly inconceivable amount of tiny, confettilike pieces of broken plastic", increasing in density the further they sampled into the patch. Findings suggested that the presence of small debris, of a similar size to the existent marine life, could prove an obstacle to cleanup efforts. The research efforts also uncovered evidence of marine life consuming the microplastics.

Larger debris found consisted of mainly plastic bottles, but also included shoe soles, plastic buckets, patio chairs, Styrofoam pieces, old toys and fishing vessel buoys. A significant collection of floating debris became entangled in fishing nets creating dense patches of pollution. Various types of marine life were found on, around, and within the tangled bundles of debris. Some of the garbage collected was put on display at the Bay Model Visitor Center in Sausalito, California.

=== Goal ===
The initial feasibility mission aimed to collect 40 tons of debris, using special nets designed not to catch fish, in two passes through the field. The project would later test methods of recycling the collected garbage into new plastic, or commercial products such as diesel fuel or clothing. If the initial mission proved the collection and processing technologies to be viable, it was expected that the Kaisei would lead a full scale commercial cleanup voyage with other vessels, becoming operational within 18 months.

== Fundraising and recognition ==
Ocean Voyages Institute raised $500,000 for the Project Kaisei initial voyages. The SEAPLEX expedition cost $387,000, funded with $190,000 from UC Ship Funds, $140,000 from Project Kaisei and $57,000 from the National Science Foundation. Project Kaisei is also partnered with the California Department of Toxic Substances Control.

The group has since been recognized by the United Nations Environment Programme (UNEP) in 2009 as a Climate Hero, by Google as a Google Earth Hero for its work with a video blogging voyage tracking system, and it was recently part of the Clinton Global Initiative in September 2010.

== See also ==
- Earth Day
- Junk raft
- Kamilo Beach
- Marine conservation
- Marine debris
- National Cleanup Day
- Ocean Conservancy
- Plastic recycling
- Plastiki
- SUPER HI-CAT
- The Ocean Cleanup
- World Cleanup Day
- https://www.youtube.com/watch?v=mzX1N7qseC4
