= Kids Ocean Day HK =

Event in Hong Kong

- Date: 2012
- Location: Hong Kong
- Target: Waste minimisation, education
- Organised by: Ocean Recovery Alliance

Kids Ocean Day HK was organised by Ocean Recovery Alliance to celebrate Kids Ocean Day in Hong Kong.

== Foundation ==
The Malibu Foundation, a California-based non-profit organisation, started Kids Ocean Day to connect children to the ocean and beaches, and to foster understanding of the environmental issues they face. The first Kids Ocean Day Hong Kong was celebrated 9 November 2012. Over 800 students, teachers and volunteers met at Repulse Bay and helped create a piece of aerial artwork featuring a Chinese white dolphin, organised by aerial artist John Quigley of Spectral Q. The design was based on 9-year-old Leung Man-Hin's artwork which won the drawing competition for the event.

== Goal ==
To raise awareness, understanding and appreciation among Hong Kong youth about the state of the ocean and the health of its ecosystem.

== Events ==
- Picture Drawing Competition
- Hong Kong Kids Ocean Film Festival
- Ocean Education Program for Schools
- Beach Education Class
- Human Aerial Art Project
