= Dead Boats Disposal Society =

Canadian non-profit society

- Formation: 2017
- Founder: John Roe
- Purpose: To remove abandoned boats and marine debris from beaches, oceans and inlets around the BC coast
- Location: British Columbia, Canada
- Website: deadboatsdisposalsociety.ca

The Dead Boats Disposal Society (DBDS) is a non-profit group dedicated to the removal and disposal of abandoned boats and marine debris from shorelines in British Columbia, Canada.

The Victoria-based Society hauled 124 boats out of the water between 2017 and 2021, most from bays and inlets in the Capital Regional District from Sooke to the Gulf Islands. In 2024, the Society's activity area included the waterways of the Fraser Valley.

== Issue ==
The problem of derelict boats is widespread along the British Columbia coast since, before July 2019 when the Wrecked, Abandoned or Hazardous Vessels Act came into effect, it was not illegal to abandon a boat along Canada's coastline. With the Act, the government of Canada gained enforcement powers to impose penalties on individuals of up to $50,000, and to remove problem vessels if they are a hazard to safety or a threat to the marine environment. In the four years after the Act came into effect, only two fines had been levied. The Saanich Inlet Protection Society says "It seems the only time they act is after the boats have sunk."

A boat may be an environmental and navigation hazard for years before it sinks, and John Roe of the DBDS notes that delaying action increases the cost of removal. While local municipalities are left to deal with derelict boats that come ashore, the problem is complicated from a jurisdictional standpoint because the seabed is a provincial responsibility, activities on the surface are under the purview of the Coast Guard, and the water in between is subject to Fisheries and Oceans Canada authority.

== Process ==
Typically, when the Society is notified by the public about a problem boat, it conducts a survey to determine if the vessel is truly abandoned. Once a boat is removed with a barge and crane, it is tested for contaminants, dismantled, and disposed of at appropriate landfills. The cost to remove and dispose of a small craft ranges from $5,000 to $75,000.

The DBDS pulled 124 abandoned vessels from British Columbia waterways between 2017 and 2021, including an estimated 89 vessels in 2020. By February 2020, the group had removed 89,300 metric tonnes of marine debris. In 2024, the DBDS worked with Transport Canada and a local group to remove approximately a dozen wrecked boats and debris from about a mile and a half of the Alouette River in the city of Pitt Meadows, in the Fraser Valley.

Transport Canada estimates there are close to 1,600 abandoned and derelict boats in the waters of British Columbia, but the DBDS's John Roe believes the number is closer to 4,000 to 6,000. Roe says that to end the proliferation of abandoned vessels, governments should track boat ownership, and penalize owners who "dump and flee".

== Funding ==
The Dead Boats Disposal Society has received grants and resources from "a long list of partners" including the Capital Regional District, and Transport Canada's short-term Abandoned Boats Program. The DBDS's plan to remove eight to ten derelict vessels and debris from the Alouette River in the Fraser Valley where salmon spawn, was hampered in 2023 by a lack of provincial government funding, but the project eventually went ahead with support from Transport Canada.

The DBDS has said it would commit to a project like McBarge, the sunken former floating McDonald's restaurant on the Fraser River in Maple Ridge, if funds were available. The federal government's Abandoned Boats Program (which launched in 2017 with an initial investment of $6.4 million and disposed of 223 vessels) was not renewed in 2026. The province of B.C. said in 2026 that there was no funding allocated for its Clean Coast, Clean Waters initiative, which has funded the removal of 65 vessels in Tofino, Ucluelet, Opitsaht, Tla-o-qui-aht, and Ahousaht.

== Recognition ==
The Dead Boats Disposal Society's operations director and founder, John Roe, has been cleaning up derelict boats from British Columbia waters for more than 25 years. Roe received an award from Saanich Mayor Fred Haynes on February 25, 2019, for the DBDS's work removing problem boats from Cadboro Bay and the Gorge Waterway.
