= Donovan Hohn =

American author, essayist, and editor (born 1972)

- Born: May 29, 1972 (age 54) San Francisco, California, U.S.
- Occupation: Author; essayist; editor
- Education: Oberlin College; Boston University (MA); University of Michigan (MFA)
- Notable awards: Whiting Award (2008) Guggenheim Fellowship (2026)

Donovan Hohn (born May 29, 1972 San Francisco) is an American author, essayist, and editor. On April 14, 2026, Hohn was named a Guggenheim Fellow.

== Life ==
Donovan Hohn is the author of Moby-Duck: The True Story of 28,800 Bath Toys Lost at Sea and of the Beachcombers, Oceanographers, Environmentalists, and Fools, Including the Author, Who Went in Search of Them, the tale of the Friendly Floatees. He was raised in San Francisco. He graduated from Oberlin College, from Boston University with an MA, and from University of Michigan, with an MFA.

A former English teacher and a former senior editor of Harper's Magazine, he was also the features editor of GQ. His work has appeared in Harper’s Magazine, The New York Times Magazine, Outside, and The Best Creative Nonfiction, Vol. 2.

== Awards ==
- 2026 Guggenheim Fellowship
- 2013 Knight-Wallace Fellowship in Journalism
- 2013 PEN/John Kenneth Galbraith Award (runner-up) in General nonfiction
- 2010 National Endowment for the Arts Creative Writing Fellowship
- 2008 Whiting Award
- 2004 Hopwood Award for Essay
- 2003 Hopwood Award for Poetry

== Works ==
=== Books ===
- Moby-Duck: The True Story of 28,800 Bath Toys Lost at Sea and of the Beachcombers, Oceanographers, Environmentalists, and Fools, Including the Author, Who Went in Search of Them (2011)

=== Essays ===
- "A Romance of Rust", Harper's (January 2005)
- "Moby-Duck", Harper's (January 2007)
- "Falling", Harper's (April 2008)
- Hohn, Donovan (June 22, 2008). "Sea of Trash". The New York Times.
- "Monsterwellen", Outside Magazine (Jan. 2009)
