= Maria Cristina Finucci =

Italian architect, artist and designer (born 1956)

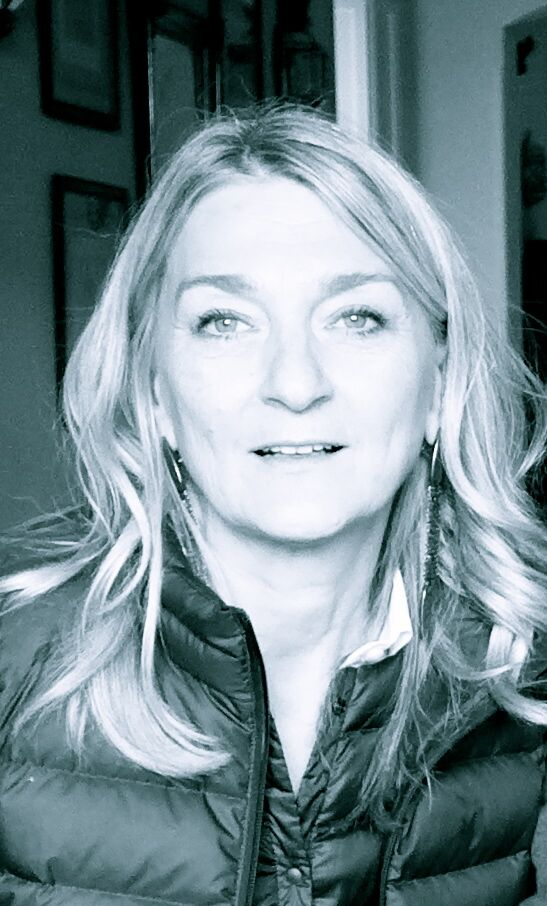
- Born: Lucca, Italy
- Education: University of Florence
- Occupations: Artist; Architect; Designer
- Notable work: Garbage Patch State
- Website: garbagepatchstate.org; mariacristinafinucci.com; studiofinucci.com

Maria Cristina Finucci (Italian pronunciation: [maˈriːa kriˈstiːna fiˈnuttʃi]; born 1956) is an artist, architect and designer based in Rome. She is the founder of the Garbage Patch State.

== Biography ==
Maria Cristina Finucci is an Italian architect and artist, born in 1956. She earned her degree in architecture in 1981 from the University of Florence, where she completed her thesis on Charles Rennie Mackintosh. Renowned for founding the Garbage Patch State in 2013, Finucci's architectural works in various countries have been featured in magazines and books. She has also contributed international correspondences to the magazine Controspazio.

Finucci has lived and worked in Moscow, New York, Paris, Brussels, Madrid, and currently resides in Rome.

Her furniture designs have been showcased at the Salone del Mobile Milano. Her artistic exploration has included a transmedial art form manifested in the series Wasteland.

== Architect ==
After obtaining her degree and professional qualification, Maria Cristina Finucci left Italy to accompany her husband, due to his diplomatic career. During her years abroad, she collaborated with various professionals and worked on a series of residential and commercial projects in New York. Additionally, she contributed to the design of the Convention Center square in Yokohama, Japan, and a school in Brooklyn. Finucci curated an exhibition on Ogden Codman for the inauguration of La Scuola d’Italia Guglielmo Marconi in New York and initiated collaborations with the magazine "Controspazio," providing correspondences from abroad.

In Paris, she focused on residential renovations, many of which were featured in books and magazines. Upon returning to Rome in 2001, Finucci reopened her architecture studio, concentrating on residential construction projects, including both new builds and the restoration of ancient villas in Tuscany. She also served as a consultant for the Italian section of the UIA (Union Internationale des Architectes) and worked on numerous apartment renovation projects, both domestically and internationally, including in London and Paris.

Throughout her career, Finucci has signed significant projects, including those for the new services at Fiumicino Airport, Aeroporti di Roma Group, ADR S.p.a. In 2008, she presented her office furniture line "Aer" at the Salone del Mobile in Milan. In 2009, her architectural works were exhibited at the Carousel du Louvre in Paris during the Salon Prestige, alongside the works of architect Stefania Stera.

== Artist ==
=== The Garbage Patch State project ===
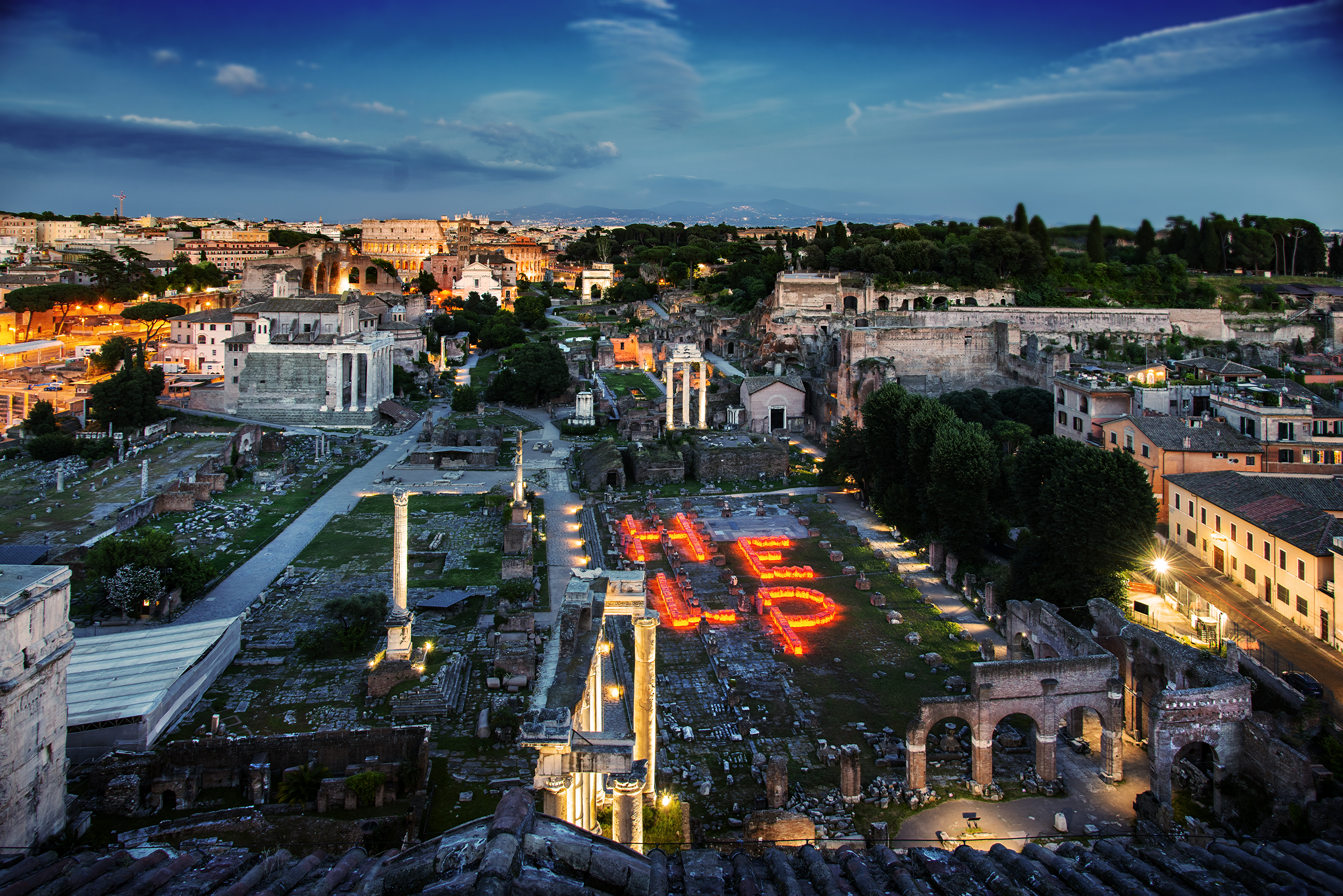
HELP the Ocean, Roman Forum, Rome, 2018

In 2012, Finucci initiated a monumental contemporary art project called "Wasteland", a transmedial artistic endeavor addressing the issue of vast expanses of plastic waste scattered in the oceans, commonly known as the Pacific Trash Vortex. The foundational idea was to conceptualize these "territories" as a federal state, giving rise to the Garbage Patch State Project.

At UNESCO in Paris, Finucci declared the "Garbage Patch State" a sovereign state by planting the flag of the new state and delivering the inaugural speech on its installation.

She created the national pavilion of the Garbage Patch State in the courtyard of Ca' Foscari University during the Venice Biennale.

The Garbage Patch State made its appearance in Madrid during ARCO, with a public installation above Gran Via.

It appeared at the United Nations Glass Palace with an installation including a serpent made of plastic caps stretching across the building's façade to the main atrium.

In the MAXXI Museum square, the installation "Onda," 30 meters long, was presented in 2015, composed of plastic flakes, allowing people to emerge or enter to discover a world of colorful and ironic plastic.

Also in 2015, the work 'Vortex,' standing at 9 meters, was located in the spaces of the historic industrial area of Bracco in Milan. This installation symbolizes the energy and destructive potential of plastic.

During the 2015 Bluemed Conference at the Aquae Venice Pavilion, a mysterious creature called Bluemedsaurus came to life. This enigmatic being, formed from scattered marine plastic, moved along the walls of the High-Level Conference Bluemed room.

After the Bluemed event in Venice, "Climatesaurus" emerged as a mysterious figure. It crossed a staircase in the Hotel Potocki in Paris during the COP 21 climate conference and was commissioned by the New York Times International.

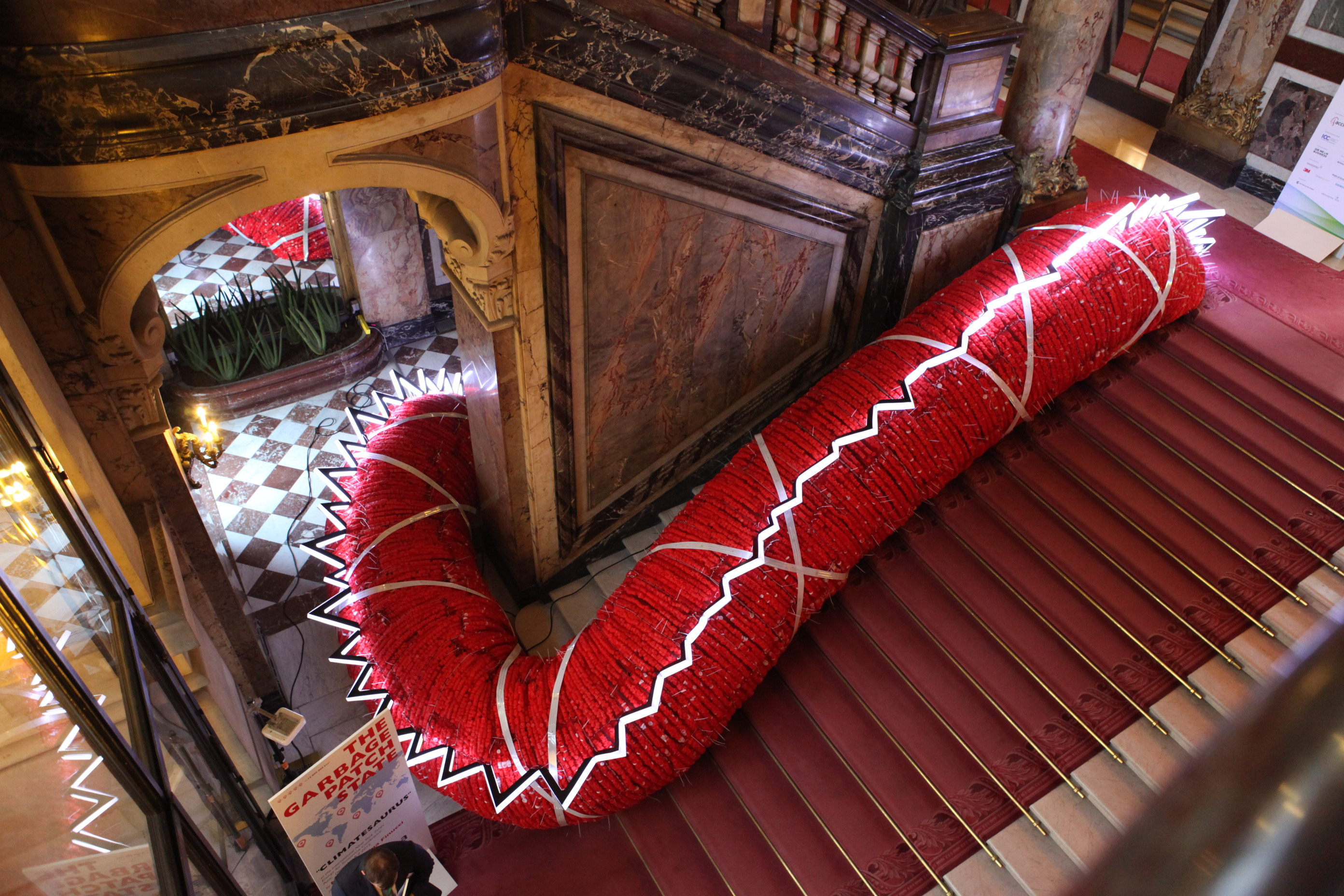
Climatesaurus, COP21, Paris, 2015

In 2016 the luminous work 'Help, The Plastic Age' was exhibited on the island of Mozia (Trapani), rich in Phoenician history. This installation formed the word 'HELP' with large three-dimensional letters in a square area in the archaeological area of the island.

In 2018 another monumental installation 'Help' in the Roman Forum was promoted by the Colosseum Archaeological Park. This work, located on the nets of the Basilica Julia in the heart of the Roman Forum, projected its light at night, creating a suggestive 'HELP' against the backdrop of the ruins of the Basilica Julia, in the heart of this ancient site.

The installation "HELP" returned to the courtyard of the University of Milan during Milan Design Week - FuoriSalone 2019, as part of the exhibition of the magazine INTERNI. In the university's courtyard, the inscription "HELP" had a luminous effect that made it appear incandescent like lava.

The fluorescent installation "What about the 8%?", created for the Italian Cultural Institute of Los Angeles, raises the question of detergent pollution in the oceans. Designed for the courtyard of the Italian Cultural Institute of Los Angeles, this work simulates the water's surface, where dissolved detergents are vividly transformed by chemical reagents, creating an unnatural fluorescent effect. In darkness, the detergent film of the ocean calls for help through the graffiti inscription "HELP."

During FuoriSalone 2023, the artist presented the installation "H2o Help", consisting of soft water tanks connected by tubes as if they were blood vessels, all connected to a "breathing machine." The work extended for over 70 meters in front of the Unipol building on Via De Castilla, which, on the occasion, displayed the H2o inscription on the façade through a complex lighting system. This new work addresses the water emergency and was part of the exhibition "design re-evolution" by the magazine INTERNI.

== Permanent collections ==
Some works are part of permanent collections:

The installation "Vortex" is part of the permanent collection of the Bracco Foundation and symbolizes the energy and destructive potential of plastic.

Finucci participated in the curatorial project "Quirinale Contemporaneo" with the work "Help the Oceans." "Quirinale Contemporaneo" at the Quirinale Palace, the official residence of the President of the Italian Republic.

The module of the installation "Help the Oceans" is presented in the project Contemporaries at Palazzo Borromeo (Borromeo Palace).

== Publications ==
=== Books ===
- The Garbage Patch State : The "Away" State. Crocetta del Montello: Terra Ferma. 2013. ISBN 9788863222050. OCLC 888745500.
- The Garbage Patch State: HELP The Age of Plastic. Italy: Terra Firma. 2016. ISBN 978-88-6322-289-0.

=== Articles ===
- [2003] "Fra architettura e scenografia. Allestimenti di Massimo Quendolo", Controspazio, n. 106;
- [2001] "Poesie e virtuosismo", Controspazio, n. 2, pp. 70–75
- [2000] "Xenia Pompeiana. Intervista a Luciano Cupelloni e Stefano De Caro", Controspazio, n. 4;
- [2000] "Nel cuore del tempo. Intervista a Giancarlo Barbato", Controspazio, n. 1;
- [1998] "Chiarezza e semplicita: lo studio Pagnamenta e Torriani a New York", Controspazio, n.1;
- [1997] "Renzo Piano per l'Atelier Brancusi", Controspazio, n.2;
- [1995] "Negozio Banana Republic", Controspazio, n. 4;
- [1994] "A colloquio con Giovanni Pasanella", Controspazio, n. 6;

== Awards and honors ==
- Marisa Bellisario Prize - Lifetime Achievement Award "Golden Apple" [Premio Speciale Alla Carriera]
- International Civiltà dell’Acqua "Renzo Franzin" Award
- Award "R.O.S.A. Canova Club" XIV Edition 2018 "for results obtained without external help".
- Special prize "Anima per il sociale" 2018
- Award from "Club UNESCO Lucca" 2018 to education to sustainable development education.
- Innovation experience award "Angi" 2018
- On February 15, 2019, Finucci received an honor from the Italian Republic for her commitment in her artistic work dedicated to the environment.

== Notable architectural projects ==
- Duplex with views, Paris
- Apartment Rue Jacob, Paris
