= Plastic Disclosure Project =

- Formation: 2010
- Purpose: Marine conservation
- Founders: Douglas Woodring, Erik Floyd
- Director: Andrew Russell
- Project Manager: Emily Utter
- Parent organization: Ocean Recovery Alliance
- Website: www.plasticdisclosure.org

The Plastic Disclosure Project (PDP) is an organization founded to reduce the environmental impact caused by the rising use of plastics in products and packaging. It is listed as an entity of the Ocean Recovery Alliance, a 501(c)(3) organization in the United States.

Similar to the Carbon Disclosure Project, the PDP encourages the measurement, disclosure, and management of plastics, as well as holding companies and individuals accountable for their use of plastics.

== Foundation ==
The PDP was announced at the opening plenary session of the Clinton Global Initiative in 2010 as a preventive project that aims to address the issue of global plastic waste.

== Main goals ==
The PDP specifies the following four main goals:

- Create a world where plastic can be used, but where there is no environmental impact as a result
- Use annual reporting and measurement of production or waste creation to bring about better management
- Encourage sustainable business practices around plastic use
- Inspire improved design and innovative solutions for plastic products and packaging

== Working process ==
The PDP tells businesses to measure, manage, reduce, and benefit from plastic waste to create a world where plastic benefits consumers and businesses without negatively impacting the environment. It is based on the principle that to effectively manage and improve efficiency in plastic use, reuse, and recycling, businesses must first quantify their use of plastics. Annual disclosure requests are sent to companies that use plastic for goods and/or services on behalf of socially conscious investors and community stakeholders.

It aims to connect solution providers with prospective companies to facilitate design and innovation. All types of organizations are invited to participate in PDP and commit to reducing their plastic footprint.

== Company disclosures ==
The Plastic Disclosure Project (PDP) is an initiative that aims to track and reduce plastic waste generated by companies and institutions. Lush was the first participant to disclose its plastic waste data in 2011, followed by UC Berkeley in 2012, which was the first university to join the initiative. The project is managed by Campus Recycling and Refuse Services, along with the Office of Sustainability, with plans to assign interns to monitor plastic waste leaving the campus. Interest in this project has been expressed by companies from various countries.

During the Plasticity Forum Rio '12, an alliance was formed between the Plastic Pollution Coalition and the PDP to collaborate on reducing plastic waste on university campuses worldwide.
