= Journal of Oceanography =

Scientific journal

- Discipline: Oceanography
- Language: English
- Edited by: Hiroaki Saito

Publication details
- Former name: Journal of the Oceanographical Society of Japan (1942—1991)
- History: 1942—present
- Publisher: Springer
- Frequency: Bimonthly
- Impact factor: 1.6 (2024)

Standard abbreviations
- ISO 4: J. Oceanogr.

Indexing
- CODEN: JOOCE7
- ISSN: 0916-8370 (print); 1573-868X (web)

Links
- Journal homepage; Online access; Online archive

Journal of Oceanography is a peer-reviewed scientific journal published bimonthly by Springer Science+Business Media on behalf of the Oceanographic Society of Japan. It was established under the title Journal of the Oceanographical Society of Japan in 1942 and published articles both in English and Japanese; it was renamed to its current title in 1991. The journal covers developments in oceanography and its sub-disciplines, including physical oceanography, marine chemistry, biological oceanography, marine geology and paleoceanography. Its current editor-in-chief is Hiroaki Saito (University of Tokyo).

== Abstracting and indexing ==
The journal is abstracted and indexed in:

- Current Contents/Agriculture, Biology & Environmental Sciences
- Current Contents/Physical, Chemical & Earth Sciences
- EBSCO databases
- GEOBASE
- Inspec
- ProQuest databases
- Science Citation Index Expanded
- Scopus
- Zoological Record

According to the Journal Citation Reports, the journal has a 2024 impact factor of 1.6.
