= Flotsam, jetsam, lagan and derelict =

Specific kinds of property lost or abandoned at sea

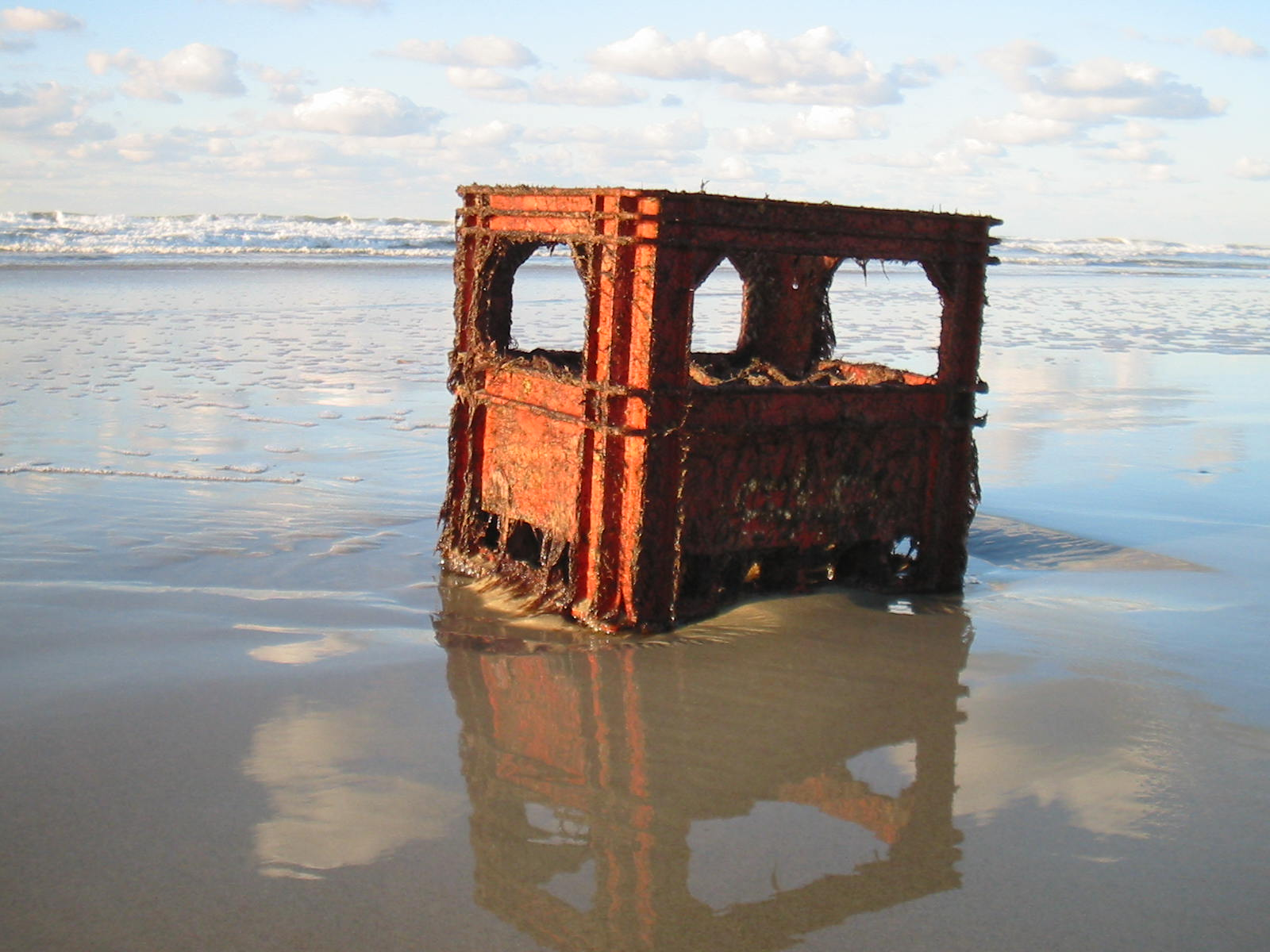
Flotsam on a beach at Terschelling, Wadden Sea

In maritime law, flotsam, jetsam, lagan, and derelict are terms for various types of property lost or abandoned at sea. The words have specific nautical meanings, with legal consequences in the law of admiralty and marine salvage. A shipwreck is defined as the remains of a ship that has been wrecked, whether it has sunk or is floating on the surface of the water.

== Overview ==
A wreck is categorized as property belonging to no apparent owner that either sinks to the seabed or floats on the surface of the water, whether it be intentionally cast overboard or as the result of an accident. The term encompasses the hull of the vessel and its fixtures as well as any other form of object on board, such as cargo and stores, and personal effects of the crew and passengers. This also encompasses the narrower definition of salvage, that is, property that has been recovered from a wreckage, or the recovery of the ship itself.

There are a number of factors that contribute to the formation of a shipwreck, which can be divided into physical and cultural processes. A site can be affected by physical processes, that is, naturally occurring processes, such as the corrosion caused by salinity and ocean currents, or the growth of native and foreign marine organisms. It can also be affected by cultural processes, that is, by human interactions, such as adding or removing materials from the site of the wreck. Any archaeological activity, such as excavation, may also be considered invasive and tampering.

In maritime law, different meanings are attributed to the terms, based on jurisdiction as well as context. For example, a distinction is made between goods that wash ashore and those that are for some reason not salvageable and/or lost at sea.

== Law of salvage ==
Ownership of a wreck is a highly controversial issue, as there are no clear lines within which it is defined. It may be acquired through various means that range from succession to confiscation. There is also a distinction to be made between the ownership of the hull itself and the cargo it contains, as the hull may be abandoned intentionally, whereas the cargo may be out of necessity (in the case of an emergency or the need to shed weight from the vessel). In these parameters, abandonment of the ship by its passengers constitutes a loss of possession, but to abandon the claim on the title itself, intention to relinquish it is required. This affects wrecks by limiting that which is considered "abandoned". Generally, a ship is defined as "abandoned" if there is no hope of recovery, known legally as sine spe recuperandi (which is the Latin phrase for "without hope of recovery"), and this fact must be clearly proven by the salvaging party. It must also occur on navigable waters.

The term "salvage" is used to indicate a salvage operation, as well as the subsequent awarded compensation. It is considered a voluntary service rendered in cases such as danger to the wreck, or the surrounding navigable waters. In terms of compensation, it is seen as being awarded to anyone who voluntarily assisted in the recuperation of the wreck, whether it be saved from upcoming danger, or from loss.

The law of salvage has its origins in the Roman practice of negotiorum gestio, which dictated that one who preserved or improved upon the property of another was owed compensation from the owner, even if the service was not requested by the latter. The law did not apply to maritime regulations, but were the basis for following ordinances, such as the Marine Ordinance of Trani, which stated that a "finder" was to be rewarded, whether the owner claimed the goods or not. The laws have evolved since negotiorum gestio, and today, in the United States, a salvor who voluntarily brings the goods back into port may legally lay claim to them, or deliver them to a marshal, in return for a reward.

== Flotsam ==
Flotsam (/ˈflɒt.səm/; also known as "flotsan") refers to goods from a sunken vessel that have floated to the surface of the sea, or any floating cargo that is cast overboard.

In maritime law, flotsam pertains to goods that are floating on the surface of the water as the result of a wreck or accident. One who discovers flotsam is allowed to claim it unless someone else establishes their ownership of it. Even when the source is known, items may be considered flotsam claimable by the finder. This occurred with up to 110 cargo containers lost by MSC Zoe in heavy seas in January 2019 off the German shore of Borkum; the lost goods found on the Dutch coast were considered flotsam.

== Jetsam ==
Jetsam (/ˈdʒɛt.səm/) designates any cargo that is intentionally discarded from a ship or wreckage. Legally jetsam also floats, although floating is not part of the etymological meaning. Generally, "jettisoning" connotes the action of throwing goods overboard to lighten the load of a ship in danger of sinking.

Per maritime law, one who discovers these artifacts is not required to return them to their rightful owner except in the case where the latter makes a proper claim.

However, according to the U.S. National Oceanic and Atmospheric Administration "flotsam may be claimed by the original owner, whereas jetsam may be claimed as property of whoever discovers it".

== Lagan ==
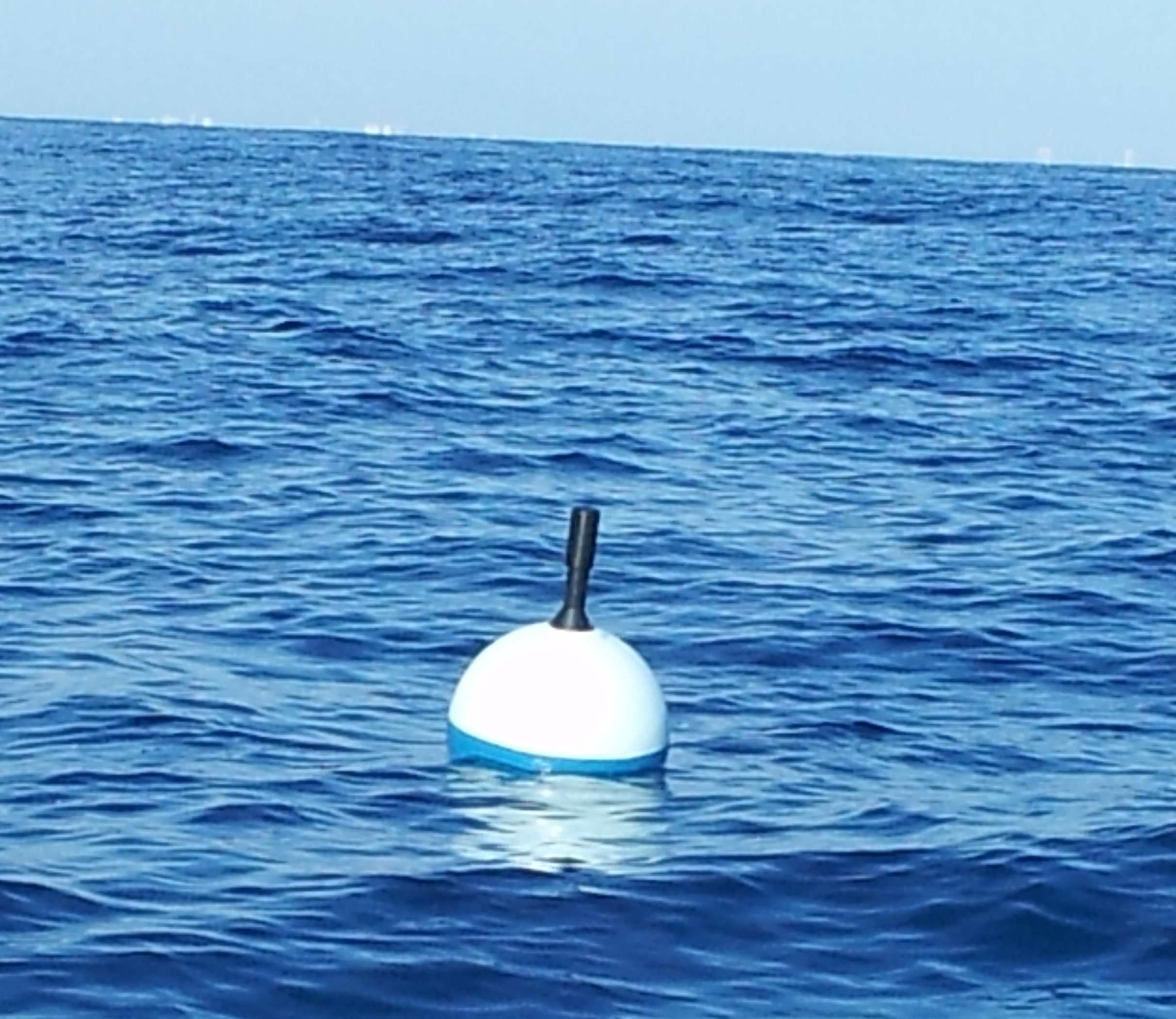
A buoy is sufficient to retain claim to an attached artifact

Lagan (/ˈlæɡ.ən/; also called "ligan") are goods cast overboard and heavy enough to sink to the ocean floor, but linked to a floating marker, such as a buoy or cork, so that they can be found again by the person who marked the item. Lagan can also be large objects trapped within the sinking vessel.

According to maritime law, a buoy or other floating object constitutes sufficient grounds for laying claim to an artifact. Lagan must be returned to the rightful owner.

== Derelict ==
Derelict (/ˈdɛr.ə.lɪkt/) can refer to goods that have sunk to the ocean floor, relinquished willingly or forcefully by its owner, and thus abandoned, but which no one has any hope of reclaiming.

In terms of maritime law, derelict is considered property abandoned on navigable waters which has no hope of being recovered, or sine spe recuperandi, and no expectation of it being returned to its owner, or sine animo revertendi.

== See also ==
- Curtis Ebbesmeyer – American oceanographer (born 1943)
- Driftwood – Wood that has washed ashore
- Ghost ship – Ship with no living people on board
- Great Pacific Garbage Patch – Gyre of debris in the North Pacific
- Marine debris – Human-created solid waste in the sea or ocean
- Receiver of Wreck – Official who administers law dealing with maritime wrecks and salvage
- Ship graveyard – Location where scrapped ships are left
- Treasure trove – Hidden store of valuables – the legal ramifications of the notion include the distinction between deliberate and accidental loss
