= Curtis Ebbesmeyer =

American oceanographer (born 1943)

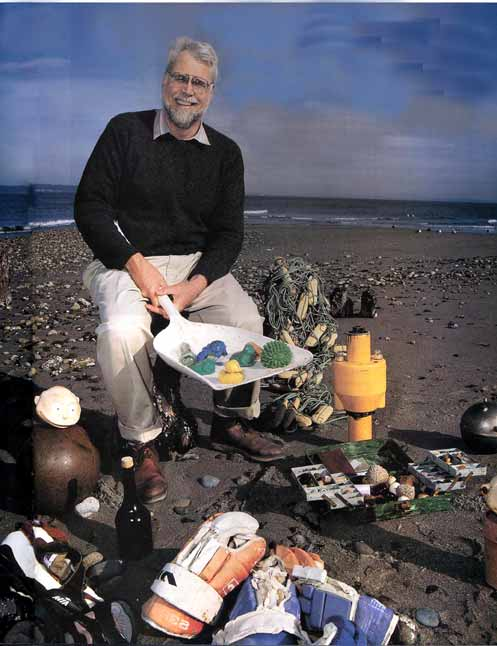
Ebbesmeyer with flotsam he uses to monitor ocean currents

Curtis Charles Ebbesmeyer (born April 24, 1943) is an American oceanographer based in Seattle, Washington. In retirement, he has studied the movement of flotsam to track ocean currents.

He gained public attention by his reporting of studies of the movement and distribution of a consignment of rubber bath toys, which were washed from a ship into the Pacific Ocean in 1992, and continued to be collected from Northwest beaches for more than twelve years. He has established a network among beachcombers to track and report such materials, and in 1996 founded the nonprofit Beachcombers' and Oceanographers' International Association. He also writes and publishes its magazine Beachcombers' Alert.

== Life and career ==
Ebbesmeyer was born April 24, 1943, in Los Angeles, California. Educated at the University of Washington––where he earned a Ph.D. in oceanography in 1973––Ebbesmeyer monitored ocean currents by tracking buoys and markers dropped at sea.

Stories vary as to the origin of Ebbesmeyer's use of flotsam as markers. In May 1990 some 80,000 Nike sneakers were released from a container washed off the ship Hansa Carrier. According to one account, when Ebbesmeyer's mother heard about those shoes floating in the currents, she said: "Well isn't that what you do?" He has said that he saw the opportunity to monitor ocean currents from the distribution of the shoes washing up on the coasts of Oregon and Washington. However, in a 1999 article, Ebbesmeyer credits inspiration for his work to the discovery by Richard Strickland, a colleague at the University of Washington School of Oceanography, of a message in a bottle calling for the release of the Chinese dissident Wei Jingsheng. Strickland had opened it in 1991 having found it in June the previous year. Ebbesmeyer and his team calculated that the bottle had been released on the other side of the Pacific in 1980.

Ebbesmeyer established links with beachcombers and formed a network of people reporting the landfall of the contents of this and other spills. Using OSCURS (Ocean Surface Currents Simulation), a computer simulator developed by Seattle oceanographer Jim Ingraham, Ebbesmeyer tracked the oceanic movement of all kinds of flotsam, including 34,000 ice hockey gloves washed off the Hyundai Seattle in 1994. Prior to this, he had specialized in forecasting the movement of oil spills and sewage.

Ebbesmeyer founded the nonprofit Beachcombers' and Oceanographers' International Association in 1996. He writes and publishes its magazine Beachcombers' Alert.

In retirement, Ebbesmeyer has continued to work with Evans-Hamilton, Inc., a Seattle-based oceanography company. It offers consulting in physical oceanography services, meteorological conditions studies, and application of marine and freshwater instrumentation.

Ebbesmeyer has worked with marine scientist Charles Moore, who, in 1999, published findings that the ratio of plastic to zooplankton (in the North Pacific Subtropical Gyre) is about six to one. This produces harm to ocean life from the very start of the food chain.

== Bibliography ==
- Okubo, Akira, Ebbesmeyer, Curtis C., Helseth, Jonathan M. 1976. "Determination of Lagrangian deformations from analysis of current followers". Journal of Physical Oceanography, 6, 524-527.
- McWilliams, J.C., Brown, E.D., Bryden, H.L., Ebbesmeyer, C.C., Elliot, B.A., Heinmiller, R.H., Lien Hua, B., Leaman, K.D., Lindstrom, E.J., Luyten, J.R., McDowell, SE., Owens, W.Brechner, Perkins, H., Price, J.F., Regier, L, Riser, S.C., Rossby, H.T., Sanford, T.B., Shen, C.Y., Taft, B.A., Van Leer, J.C., 1983. The local dynamics of eddies in the Western North Atlantic. pp 92–113 in Eddies in Marine Science. Allan R. Robinson, Editor. Springer-Verlag, Berlin, Heidelberg.
- Okubo, Akira, Ebbesmeyer, C.C., Sanderson, B.G., 1983. Lagrangian diffusion equation and its application to oceanic dispersion. Journal of the Oceanographical Society of Japan, 39, 259-266.
- Riser, S.C., Owens, W.B., Rossby, H.T., Ebbesmeyer, C.C., 1986. The structure, dynamics, and origin of a small-scale lens of water in the western North Atlantic thermocline. Journal of Physical Oceanography, 16(3), 572-590.
- Ebbesmyer, C. C., R. J. Stewart, and S. Albertson. 1998. Circulation in Southern Puget Sound's Finger Inlets: Hammersley, Totten, Budd, Eld, and Case Inlets. Proceedings of Puget Sound Research 1998 Conference, March 12–13, 1998, p. 239-258. Puget Sound Water Quality Action Team, Olympia, WA.
- Ebbesmeyer, C. C., C. A. Coomes, G. A. Cannon, and D. E. Bretschneider. 1989. Linkage of ocean and fjord dynamics at decadal period. In: D. H. Peterson [ed.] Climate Variability on the eastern Pacific and western North America, Geophys. Monogr. 55, Am. Geophys. Union, pp. 399–417.
- Ebbesmeyer, C. C., D. R. Cayan, D. R. Milan, F. H. Nichols, D. H. Peterson and K. T. Redmond. 1991. 1976 step in the Pacific climate: forty environmental changes between 1968-1975 and 1977-1984. Proceedings of the Seventh Annual Climate (PACLIM) Workshop, April 1990 (California Department of Water Resources, 1991).
- Ebbesmeyer, C., and R. Strickland. 1995. Oyster condition and climate: Evidence from Willapa Bay. NOAA Sea Grant Program Grant, grant #NA36RG0071. 11pp.
- Scigliano, Eric; Curtis Ebbesmeyer (2009). Flotsametrics and the Floating World: How One Man's Obsession with Runaway Sneakers and Rubber Ducks Revolutionized Ocean Science. London: Collins. ISBN 978-0-06-155841-2.
