= Hansa Carrier =

Container ship that spilled its cargo in 1990

History
- Name: Hansa Carrier (1990, 1992-1999); Oriental Mutiara (2009); Ocean Hope (2002); Benin Star (2002); MSC Bahia (1999); California Carrier (1990)
- Builder: Bremer Vulkan, Bremen-Vegesack, Germany
- Yard number: 1083
- Launched: 17 December 1988
- Identification: IMO number: 8717518
- Fate: Scrapped 18 April 2019

General characteristics
- Class & type: BV 1800
- Type: Container ship
- Tonnage: 18,037 GT; 26,366 DWT
- Length: 176.5 m (579 ft 1 in)
- Beam: 27.5 m (90 ft 3 in)
- Draught: 10.5 m (34 ft 5 in)
- Propulsion: Burmeister & Wain 7L60MC engine, 12,180 kW (16,330 hp)
- Speed: 18 knots (33 km/h; 21 mph)
- Capacity: 1,799 TEU

Hansa Carrier was a container ship. On 27 May 1990, en route from Korea to the United States, the ship encountered a storm which caused the loss of 21 40-foot cargo containers south of the Alaska Peninsula. Five of these cargo containers contained a total of 61,000 Nike shoes, each of which carried a unique serial number which later made it possible to clearly identify them as part of the spilled cargo. The "Great Shoe Spill of 1990" was one of the several occasions when shipping accidents have contributed to the knowledge of ocean currents and aided scientists and amateur researchers in their endeavours.

== Importance to oceanography ==
After hearing of the accident, oceanic scientist Curtis Ebbesmeyer seized the opportunity: He established links with beachcombers and formed a network of people reporting the landfall of the contents of this and other spills. Using OSCURS (Ocean Surface Currents Simulation), a computer simulator developed by oceanographer Jim Ingraham, Ebbesmeyer tracked the oceanic movement of the Hansa Carrier spill and other flotsam, including 34,000 ice hockey gloves washed off the Hyundai Seattle in 1994. In the case of the Hansa Carrier spill, reports from beachcombers revealed that the first 200 shoes started arriving at the northern Washington coast around Thanksgiving 1990, about 6 months after the spill. Beachcomber finds in January–February 1991 off Vancouver Island and in March 1991 in Queen Charlotte Sound showed that the aggregate mass of shoes next floated northward with the winter Davidson Current. The normal spring wind transition from southerly winds of winter to northerly winds of summer off the Pacific northwest coast must have occurred at the end of March 1991, because the next batch of recoveries was reported to the south off Oregon in April and May, indicating that a sharp reversal of currents had moved the flotilla to the south.

== See also ==
- The North Pacific Gyre is the part of the Pacific Ocean where the spill took place
