= Southern Ocean =

Ocean around Antarctica

The Antarctic Ocean, as delineated by the draft 4th edition of the International Hydrographic Organization's Limits of Oceans and Seas (2002)

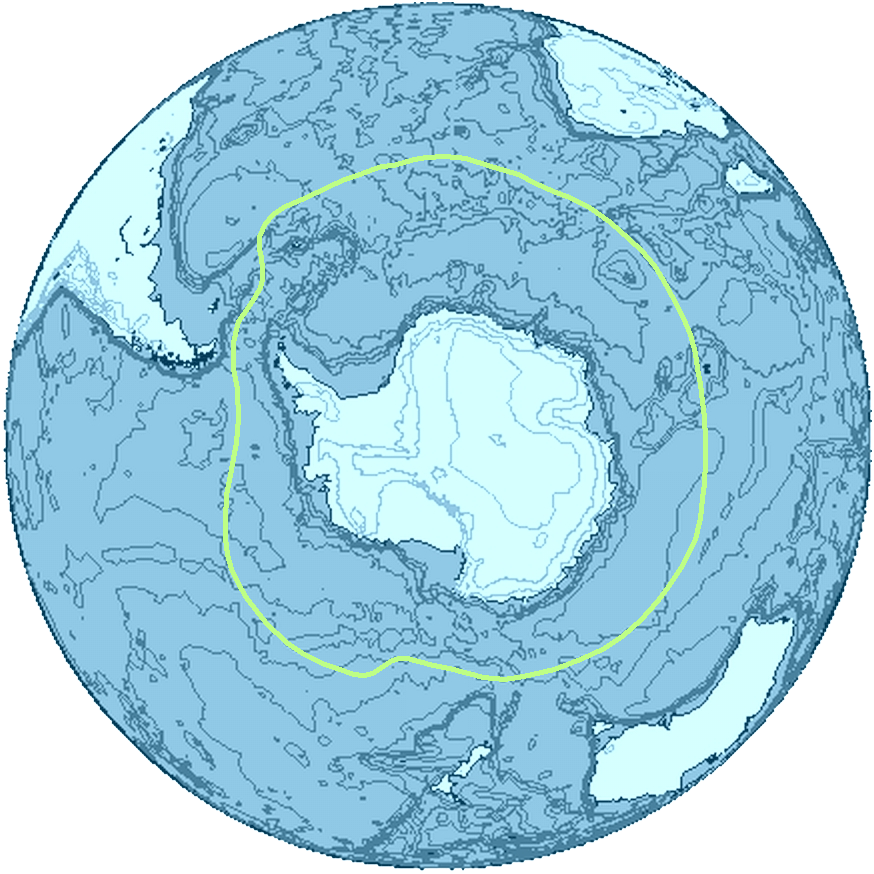
A general delineation of the Antarctic Convergence, sometimes used by scientists as the demarcation of the Southern Ocean

The Southern Ocean, also known as the Antarctic Ocean, (Note: Historic names include the "South Sea", the "Great Southern Ocean", (Note: Also a translation of its former French name (Grand Océan Austral) in reference to its position below the Pacific, the "Grand Océan".) the "South Polar Ocean" or "South-Polar Ocean", (Note: Used by Dr. Hooker in his accounts of his Antarctic voyages. Also a translation of the ocean's Japanese name Nankyoku Kai (南極海).) and the "Southern Icy Ocean". (Note: Also a translation of the ocean's Chinese name Nánbīng Yáng (南冰洋).)) comprises the southernmost waters of the World Ocean, generally taken to be south of 60° S latitude and encircling Antarctica. With a size of 21,960,000 km^{2} (8,480,000 mi^{2}), it is the second-smallest of the five principal oceanic divisions, smaller than the Pacific, Atlantic and Indian oceans, and larger than the Arctic Ocean.

The maximum depth of the Southern Ocean, using the definition that it lies south of 60th parallel, was surveyed by the Five Deeps Expedition in early February 2019. The expedition's multibeam sonar team identified the deepest point at 60° 28' 46"S, 025° 32' 32"W, with a depth of 7,434 metres (24,390 ft). The expedition leader and chief submersible pilot, Victor Vescovo, has proposed naming this deepest point the "Factorian Deep", based on the name of the crewed submersible DSV Limiting Factor, in which he successfully visited the bottom for the first time on 3 February 2019.

By way of his voyages in the 1770s, James Cook proved that waters encompassed the southern latitudes of the globe. Yet, geographers have often disagreed on whether the Southern Ocean should be defined as a body of water bound by the seasonally fluctuating Antarctic Convergence — an oceanic zone where cold, northward flowing waters from the Antarctic mix with warmer Subantarctic waters — or not defined at all, with its waters instead treated as the southern limits of the Pacific, Atlantic, and Indian oceans. In 2000, the International Hydrographic Organization (IHO) finally settled the debate after the full importance of Southern Ocean overturning circulation had been ascertained, and the term Southern Ocean now defines the body of water which lies south of the northern limit of that circulation.

The Southern Ocean overturning circulation is important because it makes up the second half of the global thermohaline circulation, after the better known Atlantic meridional overturning circulation (AMOC). Much like AMOC, it has also been substantially affected by climate change, in ways that have increased ocean stratification, and which may also result in the circulation substantially slowing or even passing a tipping point and collapsing outright. The latter would have adverse impacts on global weather and the function of marine ecosystems here, unfolding over centuries. The ongoing warming is already changing marine ecosystems here.

== Definition and term use ==
The International Hydrographic Organization's delineation of the "Southern Ocean" has moved steadily southward since the original 1928 edition of its Limits of Oceans and Seas.

Borders and names for oceans and seas were internationally agreed when the International Hydrographic Bureau, the precursor to the IHO, convened the First International Conference on 24 July 1919. The IHO then published these in its Limits of Oceans and Seas, the first edition being 1928. Since the first edition, the limits of the Southern Ocean have moved progressively southward; since 1953, it has been omitted from the official publication and left to local hydrographic offices to determine their own limits.

The IHO included the ocean and its definition as the waters south of the 60th parallel south in its 2000 revisions, but this has not been formally adopted, due to continuing impasses about some of the content, such as the naming dispute over the Sea of Japan. The 2000 IHO definition was circulated as a draft edition in 2002, and is used by some within the IHO and other organizations, such as the CIA World Factbook and Merriam-Webster.

The Australian Government regards the Southern Ocean as lying immediately south of Australia (see).

The National Geographic Society recognized the ocean officially in June 2021. Prior to this, it depicted it in a typeface different from the other world oceans; instead, it showed the Pacific, Atlantic, and Indian Oceans extending to Antarctica on both its print and online maps. Map publishers using the term Southern Ocean on their maps include Hema Maps and GeoNova.

=== Pre-20th century ===
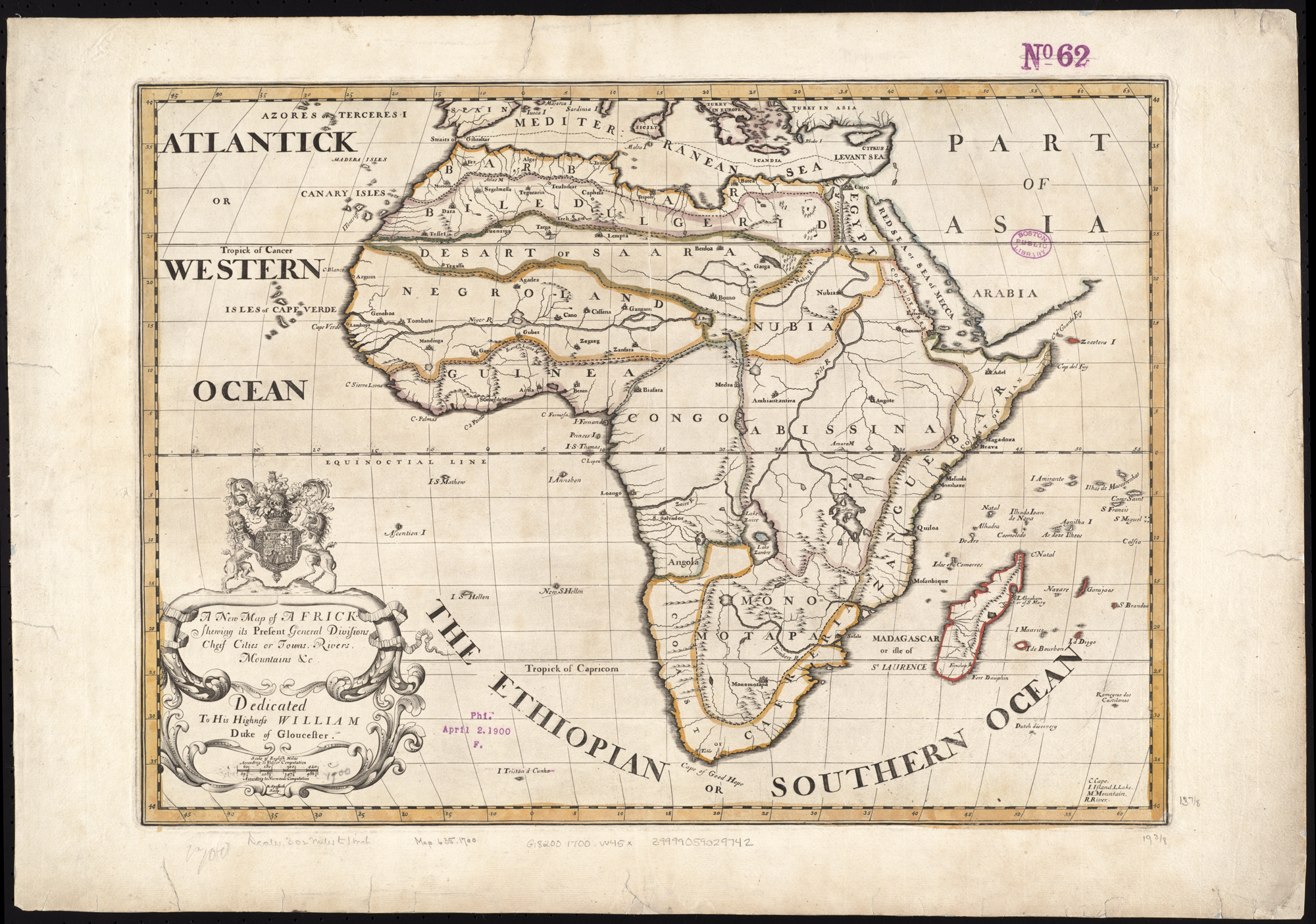
"Southern Ocean" as alternative to the Aethiopian Ocean, 18th century

"Southern Ocean" is an obsolete name for the Pacific Ocean or South Pacific, coined by the Spanish explorer Vasco Núñez de Balboa, the first European to discover the Pacific, who approached it from the north in Panama. The "South Seas" is a less archaic synonym. A 1745 British Act of Parliament established a prize for discovering a Northwest Passage to "the Western and Southern Ocean of America".

Authors using "Southern Ocean" to name the waters encircling the unknown southern polar regions used varying limits. James Cook's account of his second voyage implies New Caledonia borders it. Peacock's 1795 Geographical Dictionary said it lay "to the southward of America and Africa"; John Payne in 1796 used 40 degrees as the northern limit; the 1827 Edinburgh Gazetteer used 50 degrees. The Family Magazine in 1835 divided the "Great Southern Ocean" into the "Southern Ocean" and the "Antarctick [sic] Ocean" along the Antarctic Circle, with the northern limit of the Southern Ocean being lines joining Cape Horn, the Cape of Good Hope, Van Diemen's Land and the south of New Zealand.

The United Kingdom's South Australia Act 1834 described the waters forming the southern limit of the new province of South Australia as "the Southern Ocean". The Colony of Victoria's Legislative Council Act 1881 delimited part of the division of Bairnsdale as "along the New South Wales boundary to the Southern ocean".

=== 1928 delineation ===
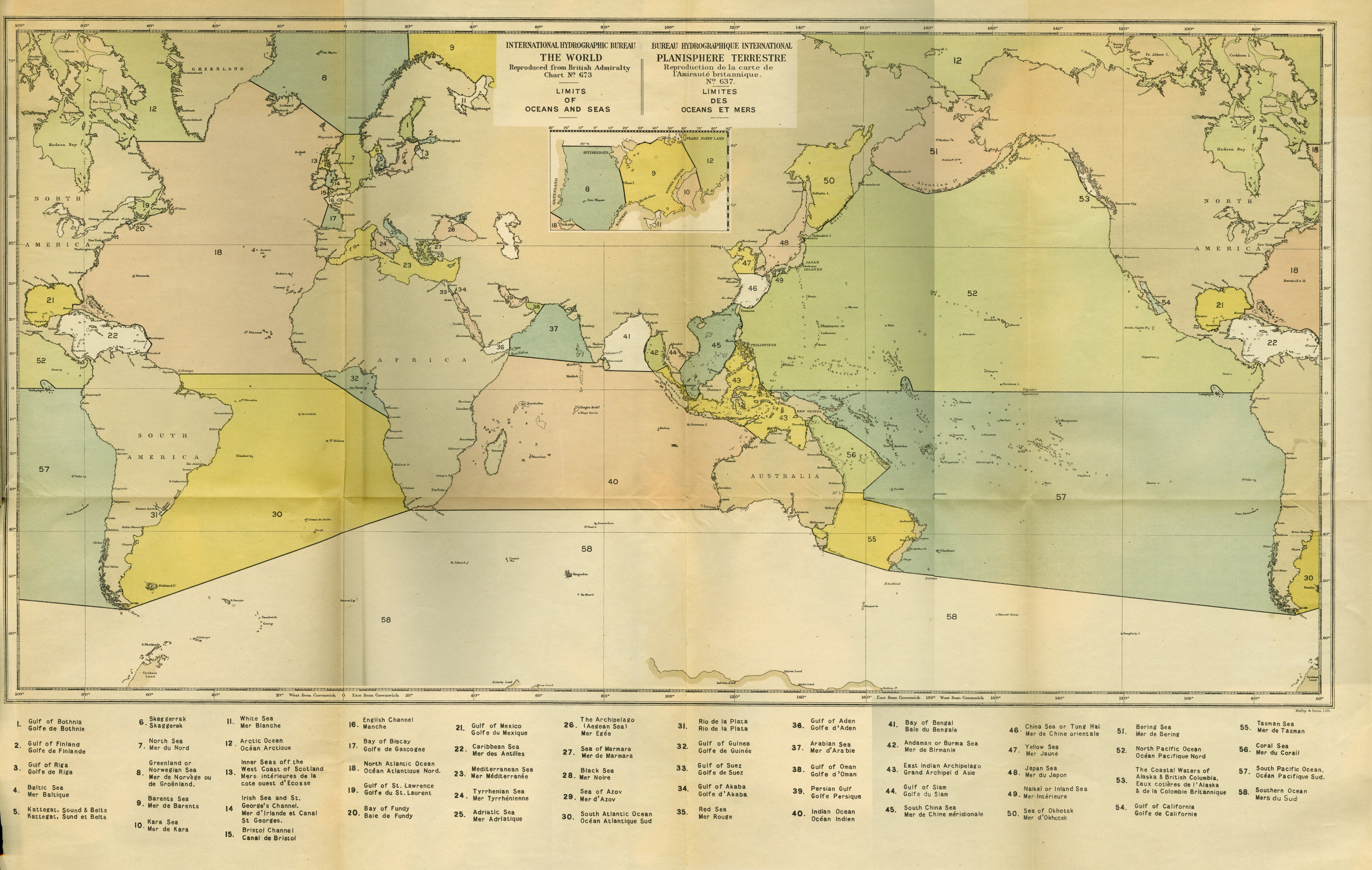
1928 delineation

In the 1928 first edition of Limits of Oceans and Seas, the Southern Ocean was delineated by land-based limits: Antarctica to the south, and South America, Africa, Australia, and Broughton Island, New Zealand to the north.

The detailed land-limits used were from Cape Horn in Chile eastward to Cape Agulhas in Africa, then further eastward to the southern coast of mainland Australia to Cape Leeuwin, Western Australia. From Cape Leeuwin, the limit then followed eastward along the coast of mainland Australia to Cape Otway, Victoria, then southward across Bass Strait to Cape Wickham, King Island, along the west coast of King Island, then the remainder of the way south across Bass Strait to Cape Grim, Tasmania.

The limit then followed the west coast of Tasmania southward to the South East Cape and then went eastward to Broughton Island, New Zealand, before returning to Cape Horn.

=== 1937 delineation ===
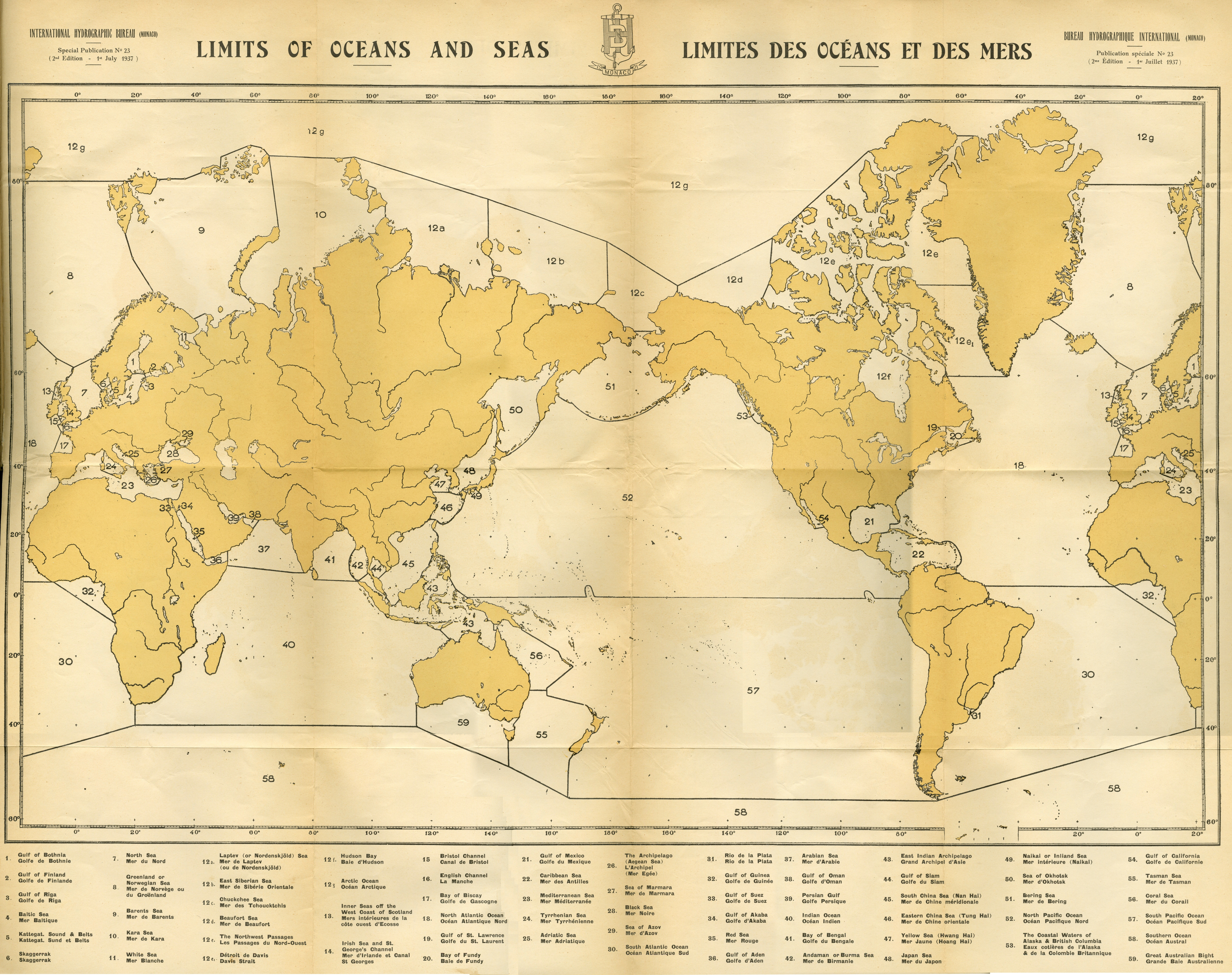
1937 delineation

The northern limits of the Southern Ocean were moved southward in the IHO's 1937 second edition of the Limits of Oceans and Seas. From this edition, much of the ocean's northern limit ceased to abut land masses.

In the second edition, the Southern Ocean then extended from Antarctica northward to latitude 40°S between Cape Agulhas in Africa (long. 20°E) and Cape Leeuwin in Western Australia (long. 115°E), and extended to latitude 55°S between Auckland Island of New Zealand (165 or 166°E east) and Cape Horn in South America (67°W).

As is discussed in more detail below, prior to the 2002 edition the limits of oceans explicitly excluded the seas lying within each of them. The Great Australian Bight was unnamed in the 1928 edition, and delineated as shown in the figure above in the 1937 edition. It therefore encompassed former Southern Ocean waters—as designated in 1928—but was technically not inside any of the three adjacent oceans by 1937.

In the 2002 draft edition, the IHO have designated "seas" as subdivisions within "oceans", so the Bight would have still been within the Southern Ocean in 1937 if the 2002 convention were in place then. To perform direct comparisons of current and former limits of oceans it is necessary to consider, or at least be aware of, how the 2002 change in IHO terminology for "seas" can affect the comparison.

=== 1953 delineation ===
The Southern Ocean did not appear in the 1953 third edition of Limits of Oceans and Seas. A note in the publication read:

The Antarctic or Southern Ocean has been omitted from this publication as the majority of opinions received since the issue of the 2nd Edition in 1937 are to the effect that there exists no real justification for applying the term Ocean to this body of water, the northern limits of which are difficult to lay down owing to their seasonal change. The limits of the Atlantic, Pacific and Indian Oceans have therefore been extended South to the Antarctic Continent.
Hydrographic Offices who issue separate publications dealing with this area are therefore left to decide their own northern limits (Great Britain uses Latitude of 55 South.)

Instead, in the IHO 1953 publication, the Atlantic, Indian and Pacific Oceans were extended southward, the Indian and Pacific Oceans (which had not previously touched pre 1953, as per the first and second editions) now abutted at the meridian of South East Cape, and the southern limits of the Great Australian Bight and the Tasman Sea were moved northward.

=== 2002 draft delineation ===
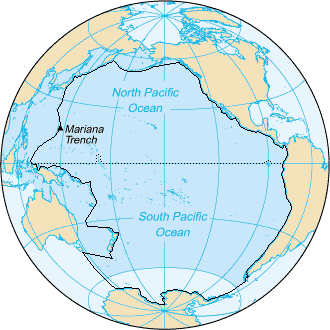
Area inside the black line indicates the area constituting the Pacific Ocean prior to 2002; darker blue areas are its informal current borders following the recreation of the Southern Ocean and the reinclusion of marginal seas.

The IHO readdressed the question of the Southern Ocean in a survey in 2000. Of its 68 member nations, 28 responded, and all responding members except Argentina agreed to redefine the ocean, reflecting the importance placed by oceanographers on ocean currents. The proposal for the name Southern Ocean won 18 votes, beating the alternative Antarctic Ocean. Half of the votes supported a definition of the ocean's northern limit at the 60th parallel south—with no land interruptions at this latitude—with the other 14 votes cast for other definitions, mostly the 50th parallel south, but a few for as far north as the 35th parallel south. Notably, the Southern Ocean Observing System collates data from latitudes higher than 40 degrees south.

A draft fourth edition of Limits of Oceans and Seas was circulated to IHO member states in August 2002 (sometimes referred to as the "2000 edition" as it summarized the progress to 2000). It has yet to be published due to 'areas of concern' by several countries relating to various naming issues around the world – primarily the Sea of Japan naming dispute – and there have been various changes: 60 seas were given new names, and even the name of the publication was changed. A reservation had also been lodged by Australia regarding the Southern Ocean limits. Effectively, the third edition—which did not delineate the Southern Ocean leaving delineation to local hydrographic offices—has yet to be superseded.

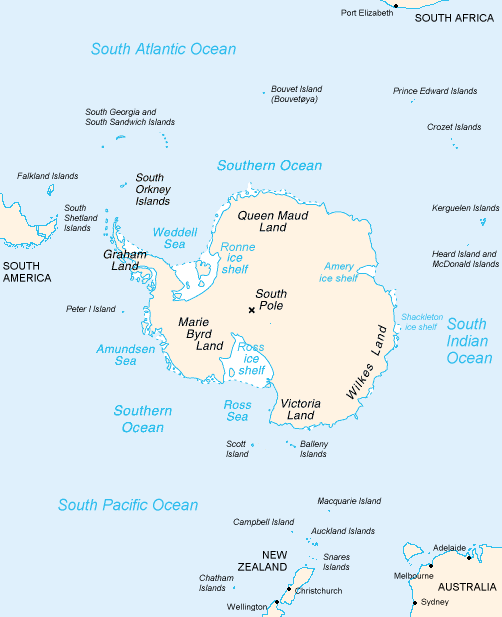
Continents and islands of the Southern Ocean

Despite this, the fourth edition definition has partial de facto usage by many nations, scientists, and organisations such as the U.S. (the CIA World Factbook uses "Southern Ocean", but none of the other new sea names within the "Southern Ocean", such as the "Cosmonauts Sea") and Merriam-Webster, scientists and nations – and even by some within the IHO. Some nations' hydrographic offices have defined their own boundaries; the United Kingdom used the 55th parallel south for example. Other organisations favour more northerly limits for the Southern Ocean. For example, Encyclopædia Britannica describes the Southern Ocean as extending as far north as South America, and confers great significance on the Antarctic Convergence, yet its description of the Indian Ocean contradicts this, describing the Indian Ocean as extending south to Antarctica.

Other sources, such as the National Geographic Society, show the Atlantic, Pacific, and Indian oceans as extending to Antarctica on its maps, although articles on the National Geographic web site have begun to reference the Southern Ocean.

A radical shift from past IHO practices (1928–1953) was also seen in the 2002 draft edition when the IHO delineated "seas" as subdivisions within the boundaries of "oceans". While the IHO are often considered the authority for such conventions, the shift brought them into line with the practices of other publications (e.g. the CIA World Fact Book) which already adopted the principle that seas are contained within oceans. This difference in practice is markedly seen for the Pacific Ocean in the adjacent figure. Thus, for example, previously the Tasman Sea between Australia and New Zealand was not regarded by the IHO as part of the Pacific, but as of the 2002 draft edition it is.

The new delineation of seas as subdivisions of oceans has avoided the need to interrupt the northern boundary of the Southern Ocean where intersected by Drake Passage which includes all of the waters from South America to the Antarctic coast, nor interrupt it for the Scotia Sea, which also extends below the 60th parallel south. The new delineation of seas has also meant that the long-time named seas around Antarctica, excluded from the 1953 edition (the 1953 map did not even extend that far south), are automatically part of the Southern Ocean.

=== Australian standpoint ===
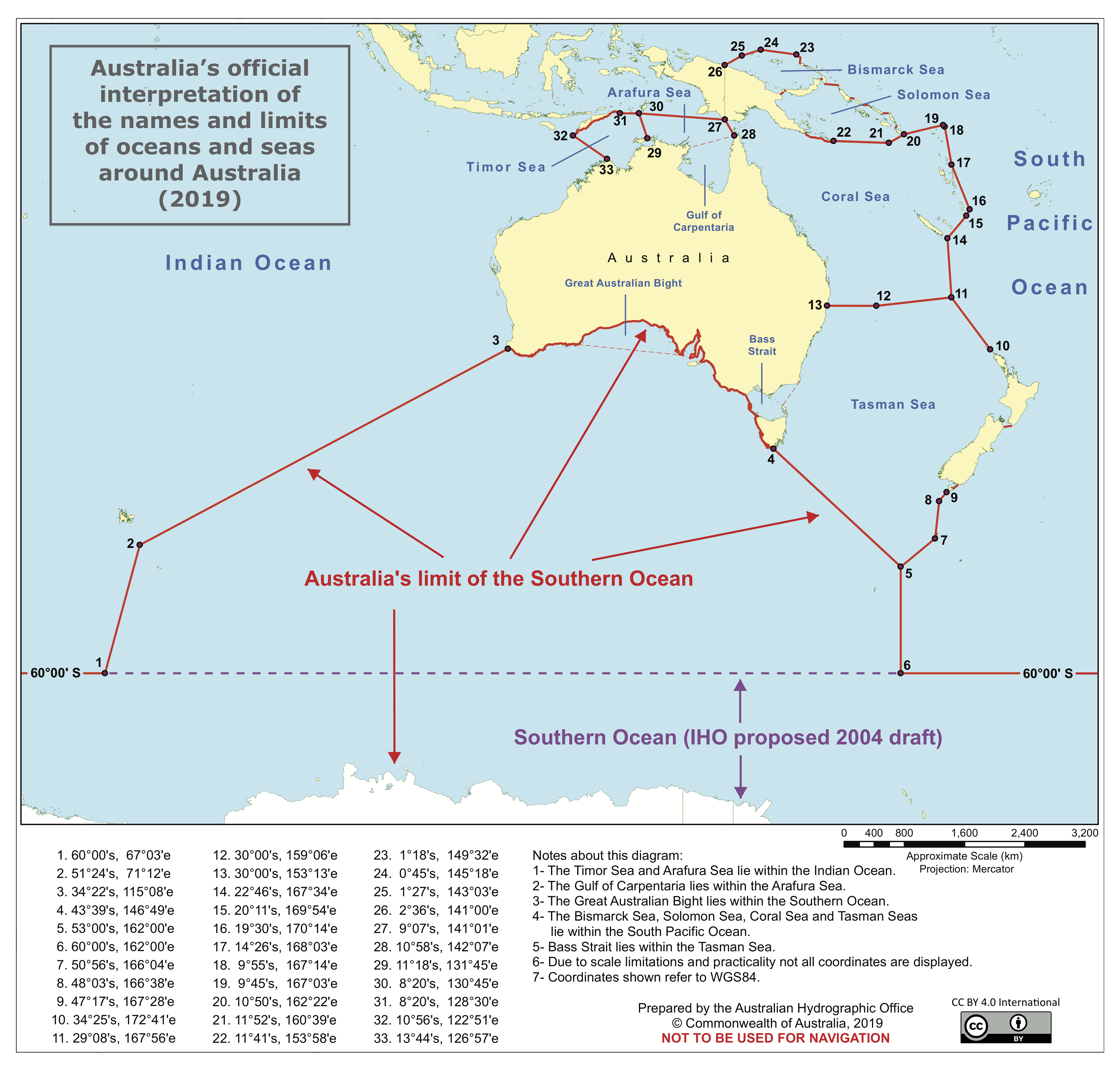
A map of Australia's official interpretation of the names and limits of oceans and seas around Australia

In Australia, cartographical authorities define the Southern Ocean as including the entire body of water between Antarctica and the south coasts of Australia and New Zealand, and up to 60°S elsewhere. Coastal maps of Tasmania and South Australia label the sea areas as Southern Ocean and Cape Leeuwin in Western Australia is described as the point where the Indian and Southern Oceans meet.

== History of exploration ==
=== Unknown southern land ===
The 1564 Typus Orbis Terrarum, a map by Abraham Ortelius, showed the imagined link between the proposed continent of Antarctica and South America.

Exploration of the Southern Ocean was inspired by a belief in the existence of a Terra Australis – a vast continent in the far south of the globe to "balance" the northern lands of Eurasia and North Africa – which had existed since the times of Ptolemy. The rounding of the Cape of Good Hope in 1487 by Bartolomeu Dias first brought explorers within touch of the Antarctic cold, and proved that there was an ocean separating Africa from any Antarctic land that might exist. Ferdinand Magellan, who passed through the Strait of Magellan in 1520, assumed that the islands of Tierra del Fuego to the south were an extension of this unknown southern land. In 1564, Abraham Ortelius published his first map, Typus Orbis Terrarum, an eight-leaved wall map of the world, on which he identified the Regio Patalis with Locach as a northward extension of the Terra Australis, reaching as far as New Guinea.

European geographers continued to connect the coast of Tierra del Fuego with the coast of New Guinea on their globes, and allowing their imaginations to run riot in the vast unknown spaces of the south Atlantic, south Indian and Pacific oceans they sketched the outlines of the Terra Australis Incognita ("Unknown Southern Land"), a vast continent stretching in parts into the tropics. The search for this great south land was a leading motive of explorers in the 16th and the early part of the 17th centuries.

In 1606, Pedro Fernández de Quirós took possession for the king of Spain all of the lands he had discovered in Australia del Espiritu Santo (the New Hebrides) and those he would discover "even to the Pole".

Francis Drake, like Spanish explorers before him, had speculated that there might be an open channel south of Tierra del Fuego. When Willem Schouten and Jacob Le Maire discovered the southern extremity of Tierra del Fuego and named it Cape Horn in 1615, they proved that the Tierra del Fuego archipelago was of small extent and not connected to the southern land, as previously thought. Subsequently, in 1642, Abel Tasman showed that even New Holland (Australia) was separated by sea from any continuous southern continent.

=== South of the Antarctic Convergence ===
Portrait of Edmund Halley by Godfrey Kneller (before 1721)

The visit to South Georgia by Anthony de la Roché in 1675 was the first-ever discovery of land south of the Antarctic Convergence, i.e. in the Southern Ocean/Antarctic. Soon after the voyage cartographers started to depict "Roché Island", honouring the discoverer. James Cook was aware of la Roché's discovery when surveying and mapping the island in 1775.

Edmond Halley's voyage in HMS Paramour for magnetic investigations in the South Atlantic met the pack ice in 52° S in January 1700, but that latitude (he reached 140 mi [230 km] off the north coast of South Georgia) was his farthest south. A determined effort on the part of the French naval officer Jean-Baptiste Charles Bouvet de Lozier to discover the "South Land" – described by a half legendary "sieur de Gonneyville" – resulted in the discovery of Bouvet Island in 54°10′ S, and in the navigation of 48° of longitude of ice-cumbered sea nearly in 55° S in 1730.

In 1771, Yves Joseph Kerguelen sailed from France with instructions to proceed south from Mauritius in search of "a very large continent". He lighted upon a land in 50° S which he called South France, and believed to be the central mass of the southern continent. He was sent out again to complete the exploration of the new land, and found it to be only an inhospitable island which he renamed the Isle of Desolation, but which was ultimately named after him.

=== South of the Antarctic Circle ===
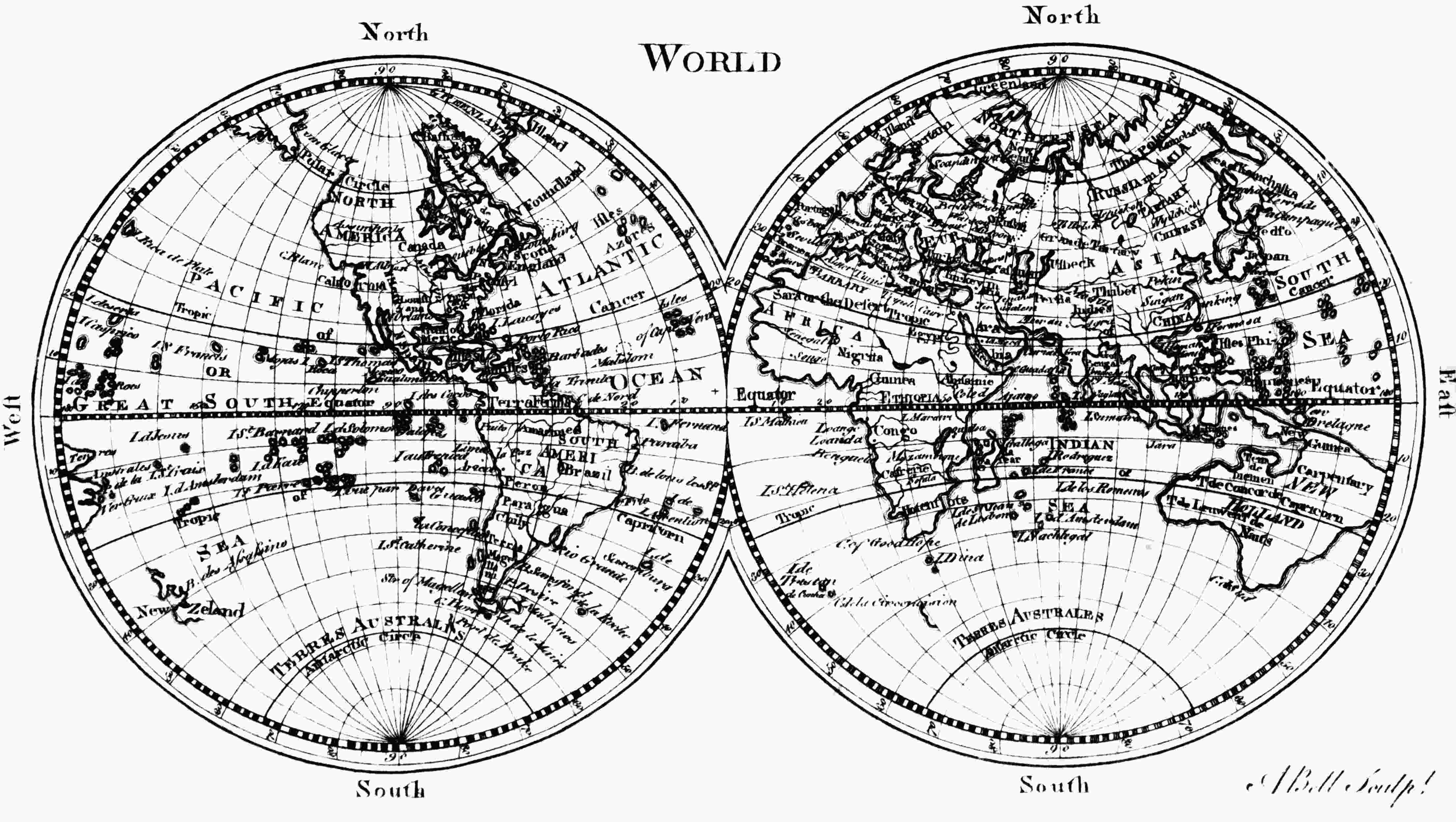
"Terres Australes" [sic] label without any charted landmass

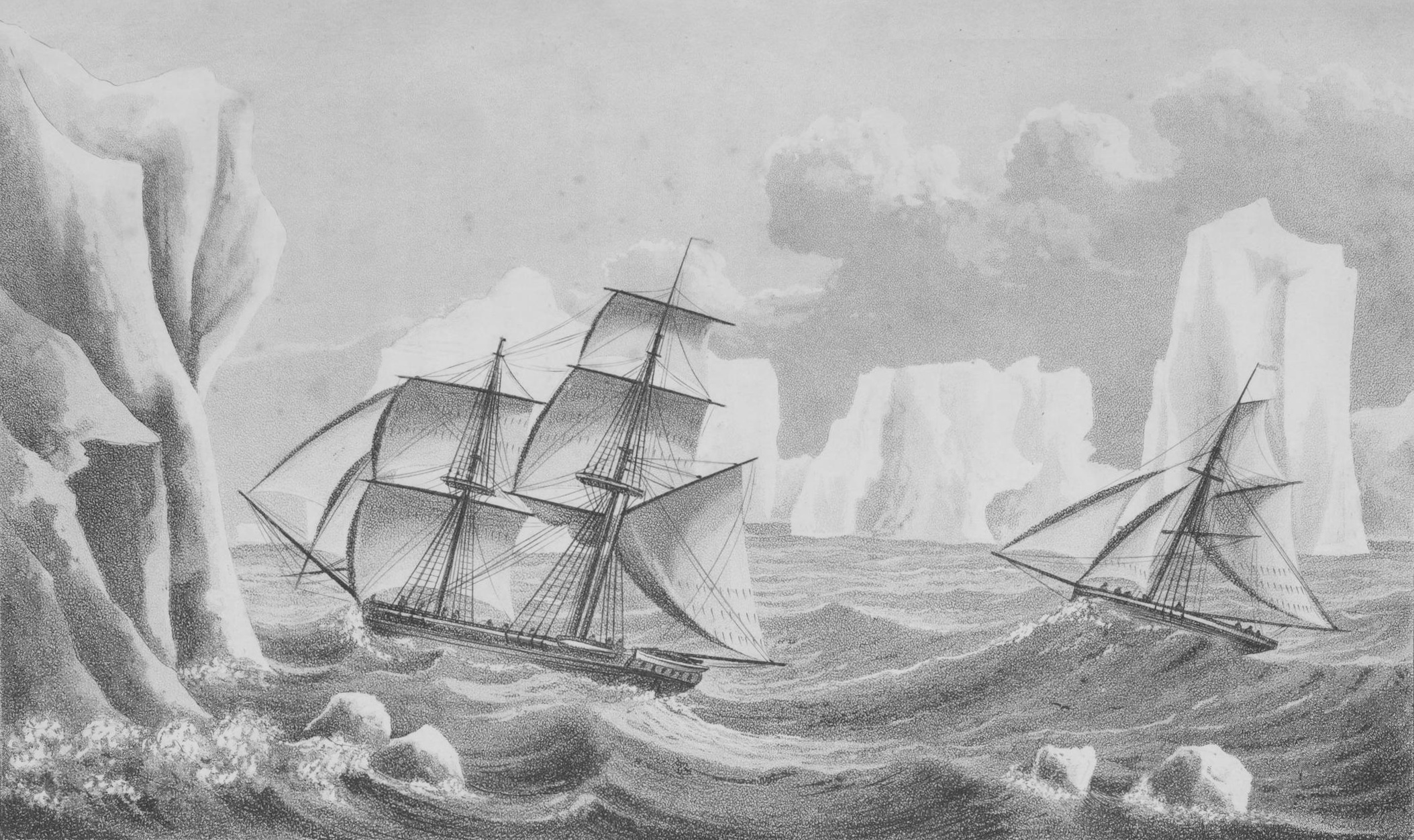
James Weddell's second expedition in 1823, depicting the brig Jane and the cutter Beaufroy

The obsession of the undiscovered continent culminated in the brain of Alexander Dalrymple, the brilliant and erratic hydrographer who was nominated by the Royal Society to command the Transit of Venus expedition to Tahiti in 1769. The command of the expedition was given by the admiralty to Captain James Cook. Sailing in 1772 with Resolution, a vessel of 462 tons under his own command and Adventure of 336 tons under Captain Tobias Furneaux, Cook first searched in vain for Bouvet Island, then sailed for 20 degrees of longitude to the westward in latitude 58° S, and then 30° eastward for the most part south of 60° S, a lower southern latitude than had ever been voluntarily entered before by any vessel. On 17 January 1773 the Antarctic Circle was crossed for the first time in history and the two ships reached 67° 15' S by 39° 35' E, where their course was stopped by ice.

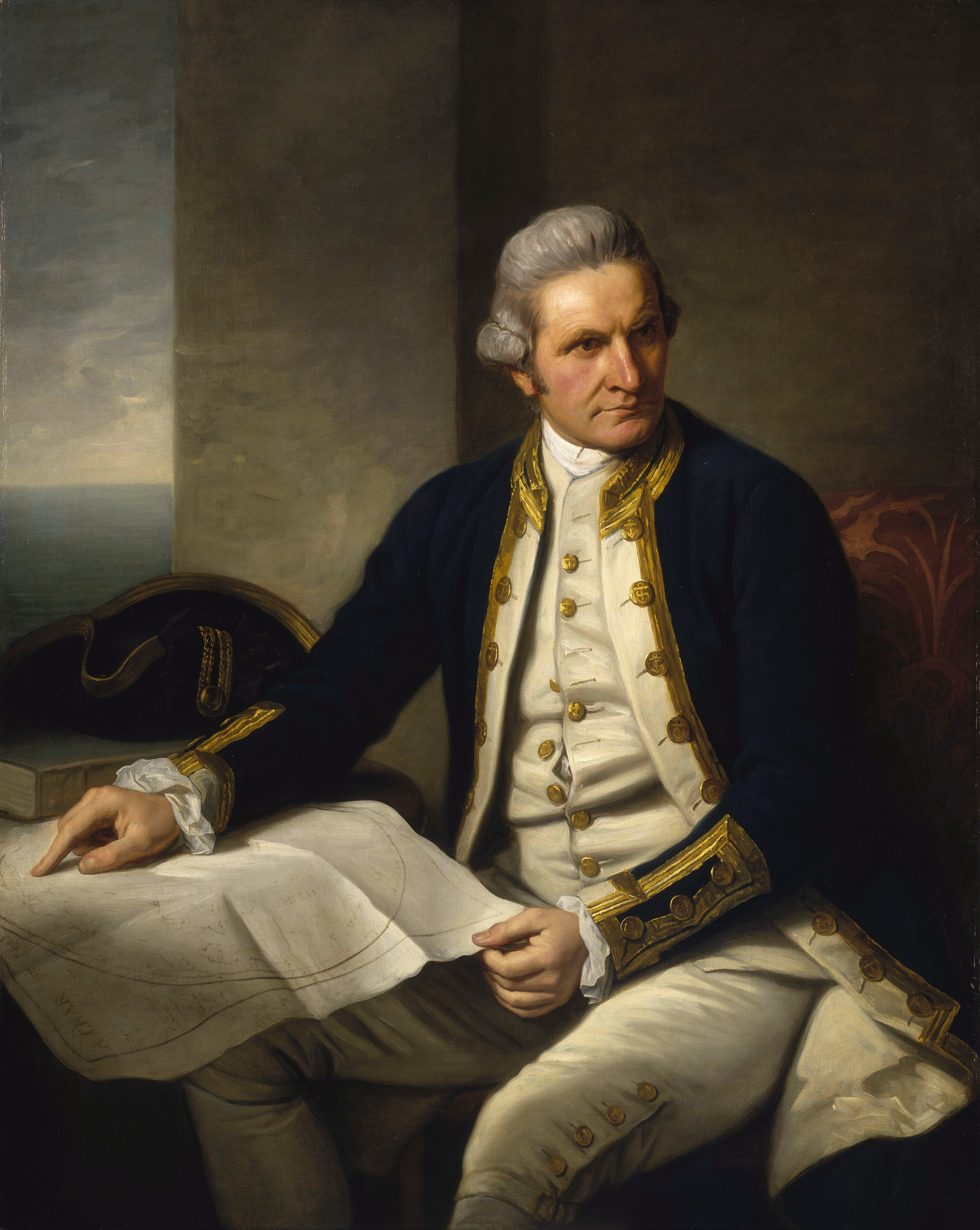
Famous official portrait of Captain James Cook who proved that waters encompassed the southern latitudes of the globe. "He holds his own chart of the Southern Ocean on the table and his right hand points to the east coast of Australia on it."

Cook then turned northward to look for French Southern and Antarctic Lands, of the discovery of which he had received news at Cape Town, but from the rough determination of his longitude by Kerguelen, Cook reached the assigned latitude 10° too far east and did not see it. He turned south again and was stopped by ice in 61° 52′ S by 95° E and continued eastward nearly on the parallel of 60° S to 147° E. On 16 March, the approaching winter drove him northward for rest to New Zealand and the tropical islands of the Pacific. In November 1773, Cook left New Zealand, having parted company with the Adventure, and reached 60° S by 177° W, whence he sailed eastward keeping as far south as the floating ice allowed. The Antarctic Circle was crossed on 20 December and Cook remained south of it for three days, compelled after reaching 67° 31′ S to stand north again in 135° W.

A long detour to 47° 50′ S served to show that there was no land connection between New Zealand and Tierra del Fuego. Turning south again, Cook crossed the Antarctic Circle for the third time at 109° 30′ W before his progress was once again blocked by ice four days later at 71° 10′ S by 106° 54′ W. This point, reached on 30 January 1774, was the farthest south attained in the 18th century. With a great detour to the east, almost to the coast of South America, the expedition regained Tahiti for refreshment. In November 1774, Cook started from New Zealand and crossed the South Pacific without sighting land between 53° and 57° S to Tierra del Fuego; then, passing Cape Horn on 29 December, he rediscovered Roché Island renaming it Isle of Georgia, and discovered the South Sandwich Islands (named Sandwich Land by him), the only ice-clad land he had seen, before crossing the South Atlantic to the Cape of Good Hope between 55° and 60°. He thereby laid open the way for future Antarctic exploration by exploding the myth of a habitable southern continent. Cook's most southerly discovery of land lay on the temperate side of the 60th parallel, and he convinced himself that if land lay farther south it was practically inaccessible and without economic value.

Voyagers rounding Cape Horn frequently met with contrary winds and were driven southward into snowy skies and ice-encumbered seas; but so far as can be ascertained none of them before 1770 reached the Antarctic Circle, or knew it, if they did.

In a voyage from 1822 to 1824, James Weddell commanded the 160-ton brig Jane, accompanied by his second ship Beaufoy captained by Matthew Brisbane. Together they sailed to the South Orkneys where sealing proved disappointing. They turned south in the hope of finding a better sealing ground. The season was unusually mild and tranquil, and on 20 February 1823 the two ships reached latitude 74°15' S and longitude 34°16'45″ W the southernmost position any ship had ever reached up to that time. A few icebergs were sighted but there was still no sight of land, leading Weddell to theorize that the sea continued as far as the South Pole. Another two days' sailing would have brought him to Coat's Land (to the east of the Weddell Sea) but Weddell decided to turn back.

=== First sighting of land ===
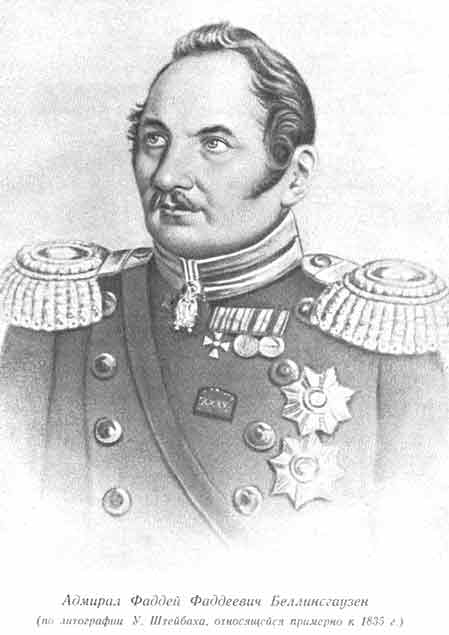
Admiral von Bellingshausen

The first land south of the parallel 60° south latitude was discovered by the Englishman William Smith, who sighted Livingston Island on 19 February 1819. A few months later Smith returned to explore the other islands of the South Shetlands archipelago, landed on King George Island, and claimed the new territories for Britain.

In the meantime, the Spanish Navy ship San Telmo sank in September 1819 when trying to cross Cape Horn. Parts of her wreckage were found months later by sealers on the north coast of Livingston Island (South Shetlands). It is unknown if some survivor managed to be the first to set foot on these Antarctic islands.

The first confirmed sighting of mainland Antarctica cannot be accurately attributed to one single person. It can be narrowed down to three individuals. According to various sources, three men all sighted the ice shelf or the continent within days or months of each other: Fabian Gottlieb von Bellingshausen, a captain in the Russian Imperial Navy; Edward Bransfield, a captain in the Royal Navy; and Nathaniel Palmer, an American sailor out of Stonington, Connecticut. It is certain that the expedition, led by von Bellingshausen and Lazarev on the ships Vostok and Mirny, reached a point within 32 km (20 mi) from Princess Martha Coast and recorded the sight of an ice shelf at 69°21′28″S 2°14′50″W that became known as the Fimbul Ice Shelf. On 30 January 1820, Bransfield sighted Trinity Peninsula, the northernmost point of the Antarctic mainland, while Palmer sighted the mainland in the area south of Trinity Peninsula in November 1820. Von Bellingshausen's expedition also discovered Peter I Island and Alexander I Island, the first islands to be discovered south of the circle.

Historical maps showing a southern ocean between Antarctica and the continents of South America, Africa and Australia
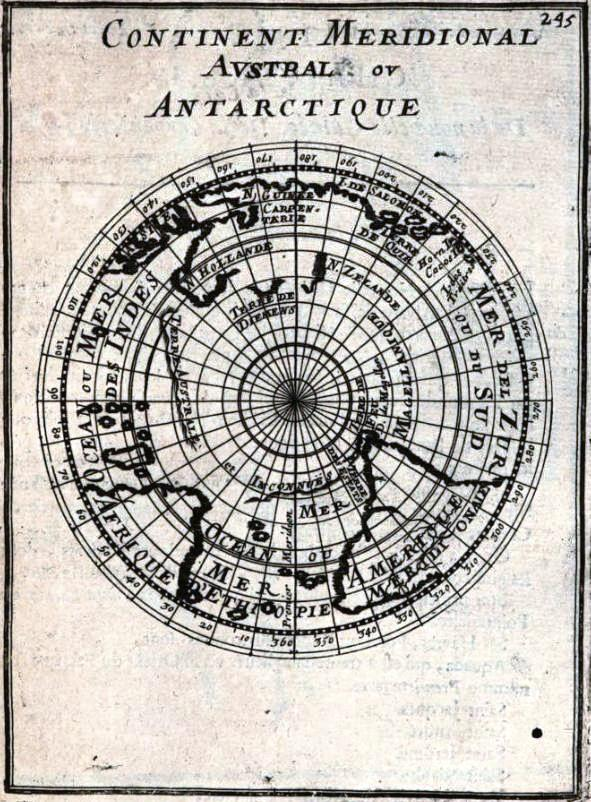
1683 map by French cartographer Alain Manesson Mallet from his publication Description de L'Univers. Shows a sea below both the Atlantic and Pacific oceans at a time when Tierra del Fuego was believed joined to Antarctica. Sea is named Mer Magellanique after Ferdinand Magellan.

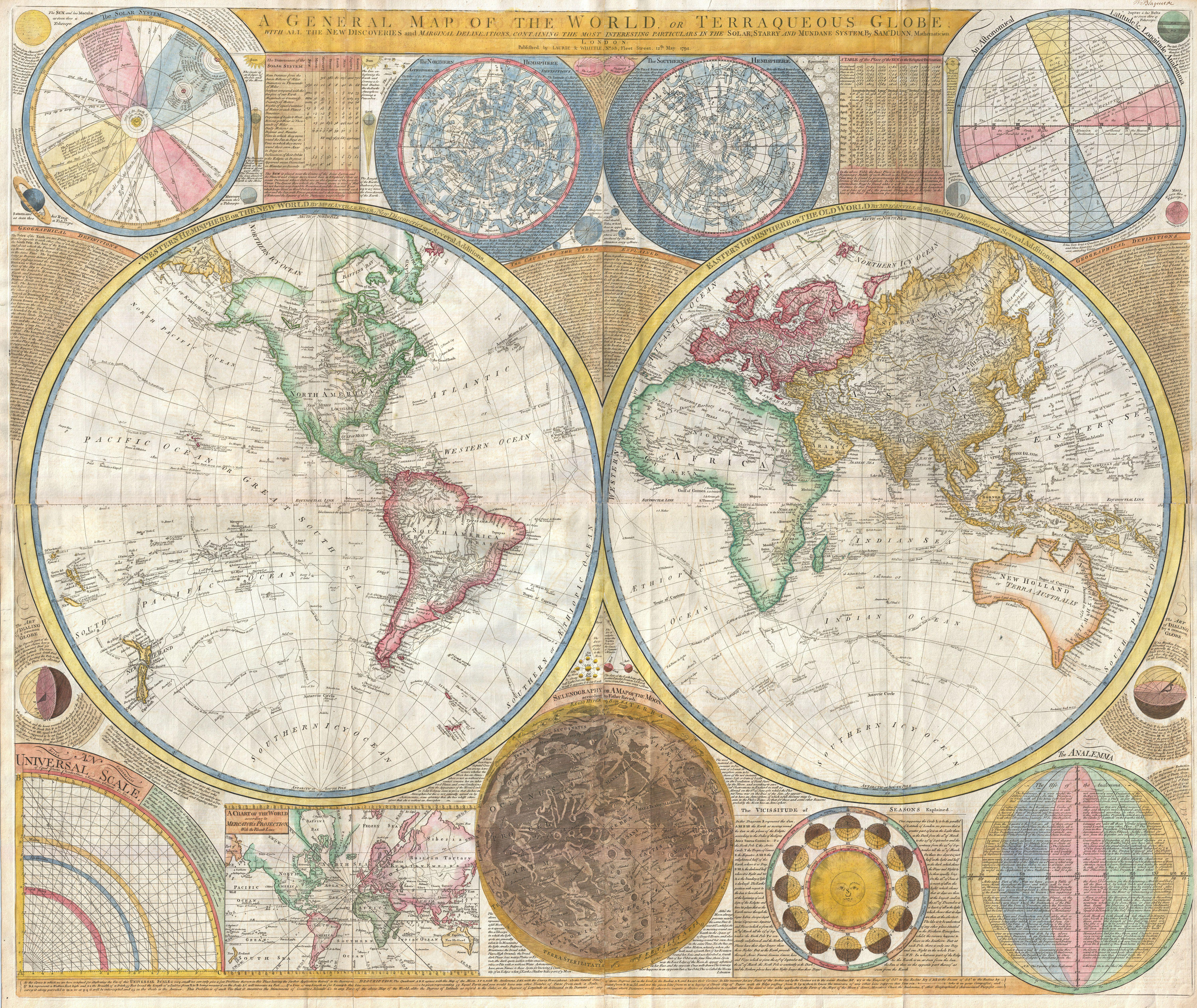
Samuel Dunn's 1794 General Map of the World or Terraqueous Globe shows a Southern Ocean (but meaning what is today named the South Atlantic) and a Southern Icy Ocean.

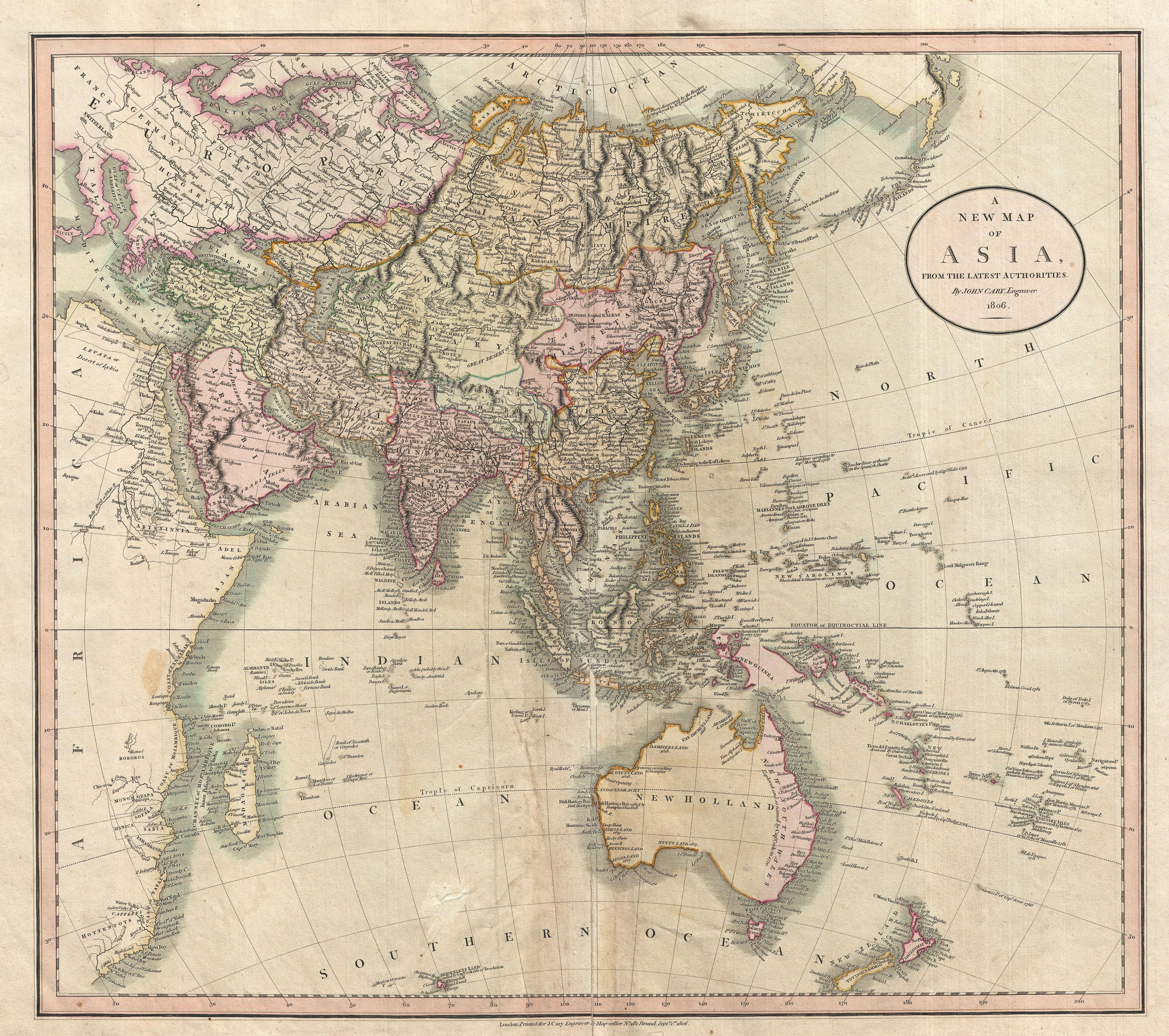
A New Map of Asia, from the Latest Authorities, by John Cary, Engraver, 1806, shows the Southern Ocean lying to the south of both the Indian Ocean and Australia.

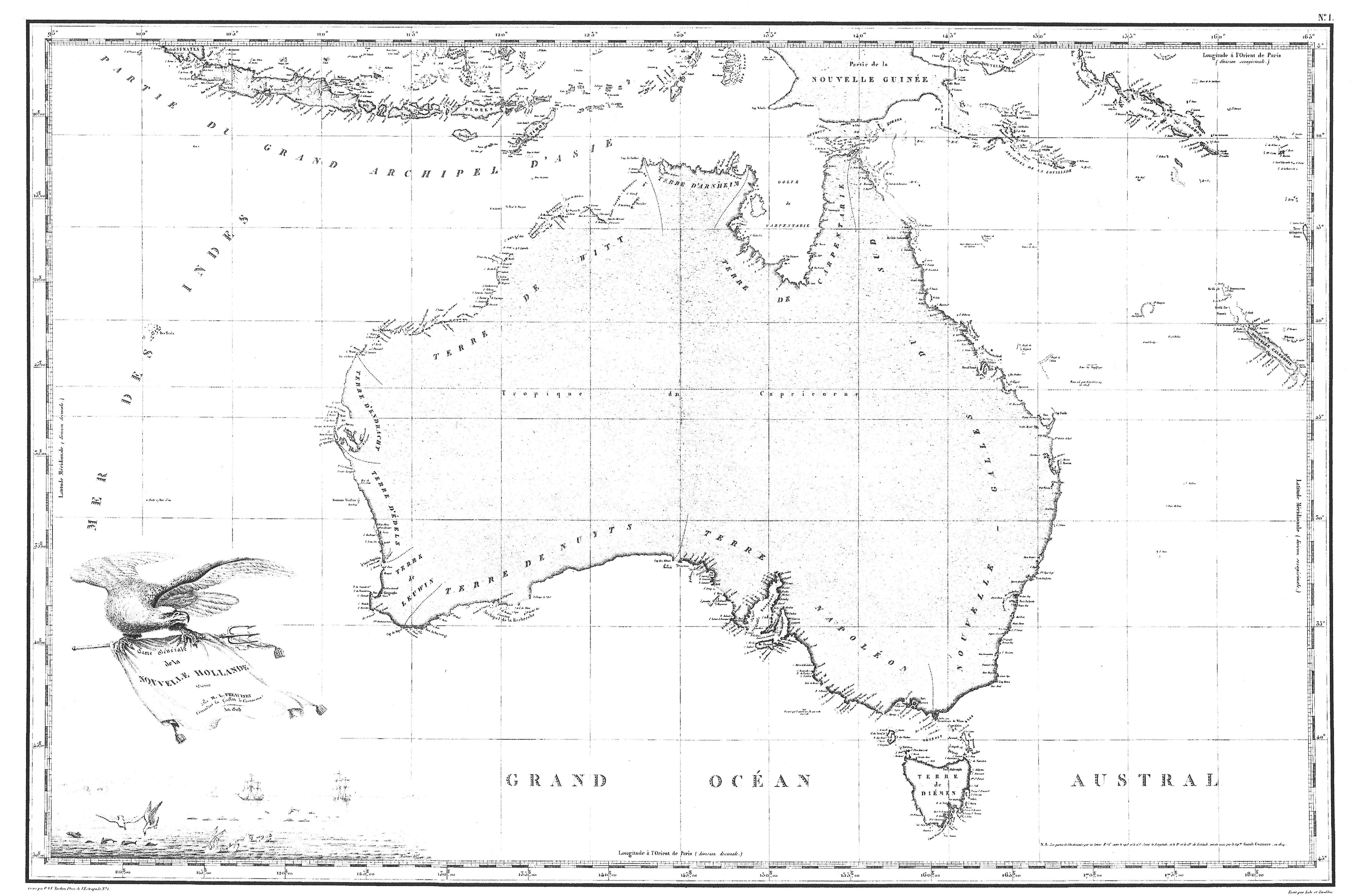
Freycinet Map of 1811 – resulted from the 1800–1803 French Baudin expedition to Australia and was the first full map of Australia ever to be published. In French, the map named the ocean immediately below Australia as the Grand Océan Austral ('Great Southern Ocean').

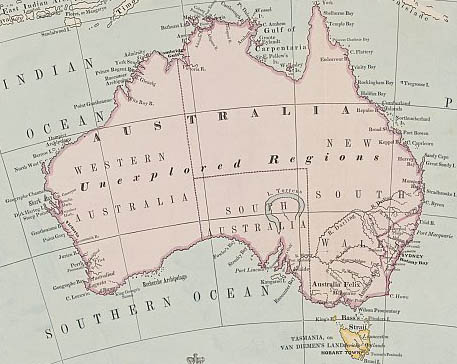
1863 map of Australia shows the Southern Ocean lying immediately to the south of Australia.

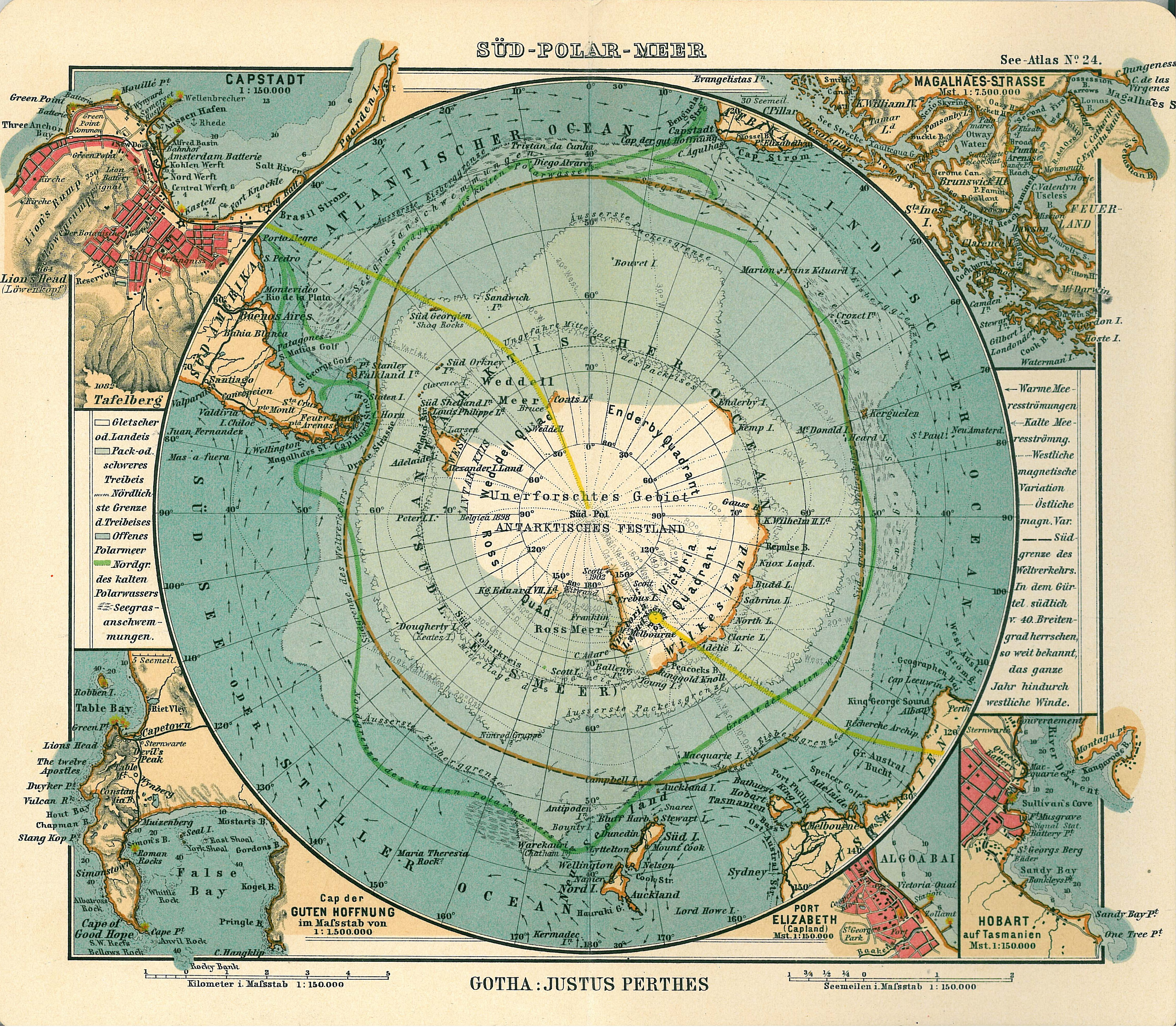
1906 map by German publisher Justus Perthes showing Antarctica encompassed by an Antarktischer (Sudl. Eismeer) Ocean – the 'Antarctic (South Arctic) Ocean'.

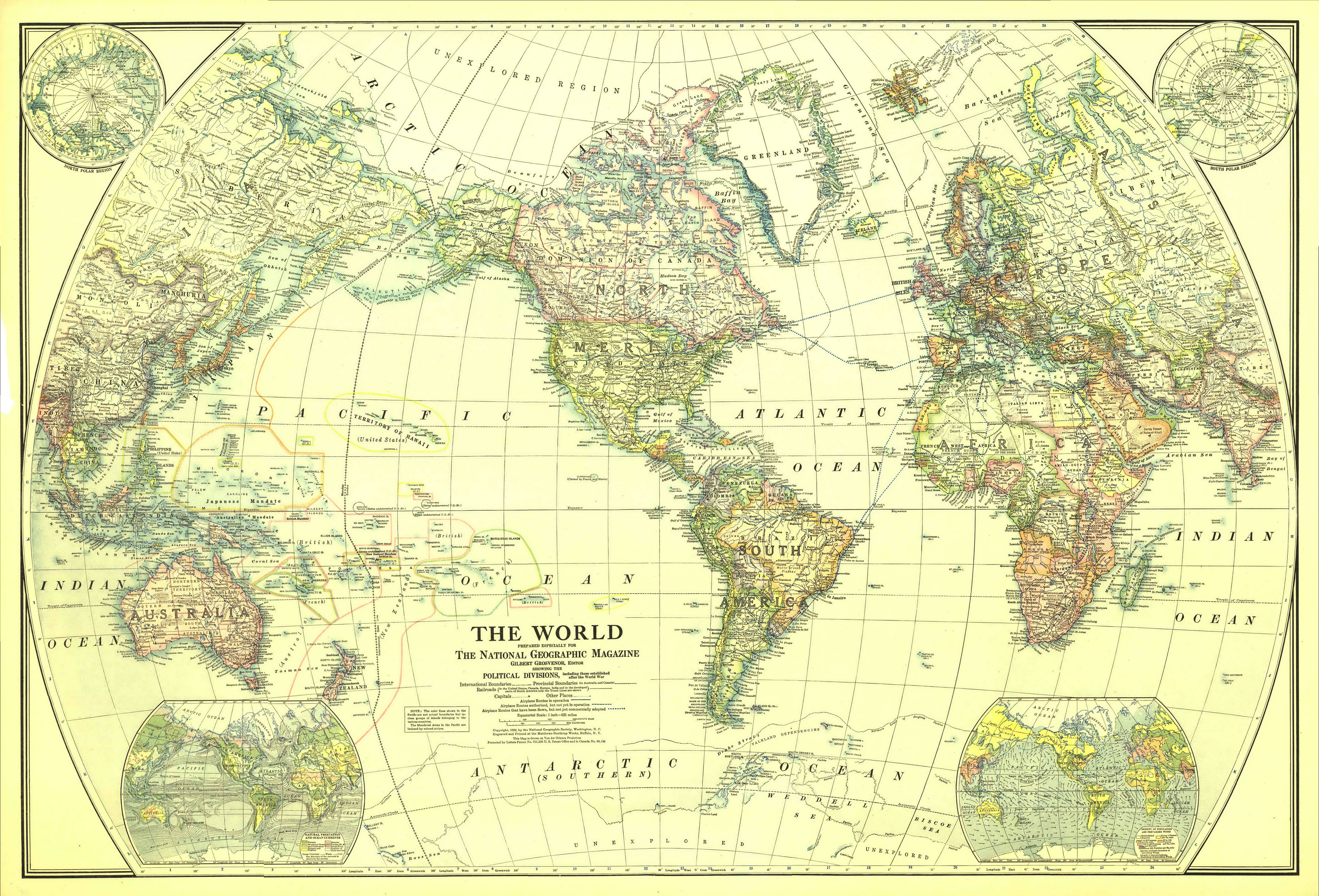
Map of The World in 1922 by the National Geographic Society showing the Antarctic (Southern) Ocean.

=== Antarctic expeditions ===
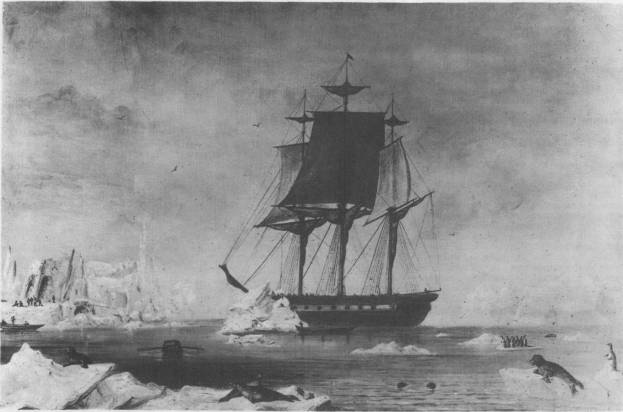
USS Vincennes at Disappointment Bay, Antarctica in early 1840

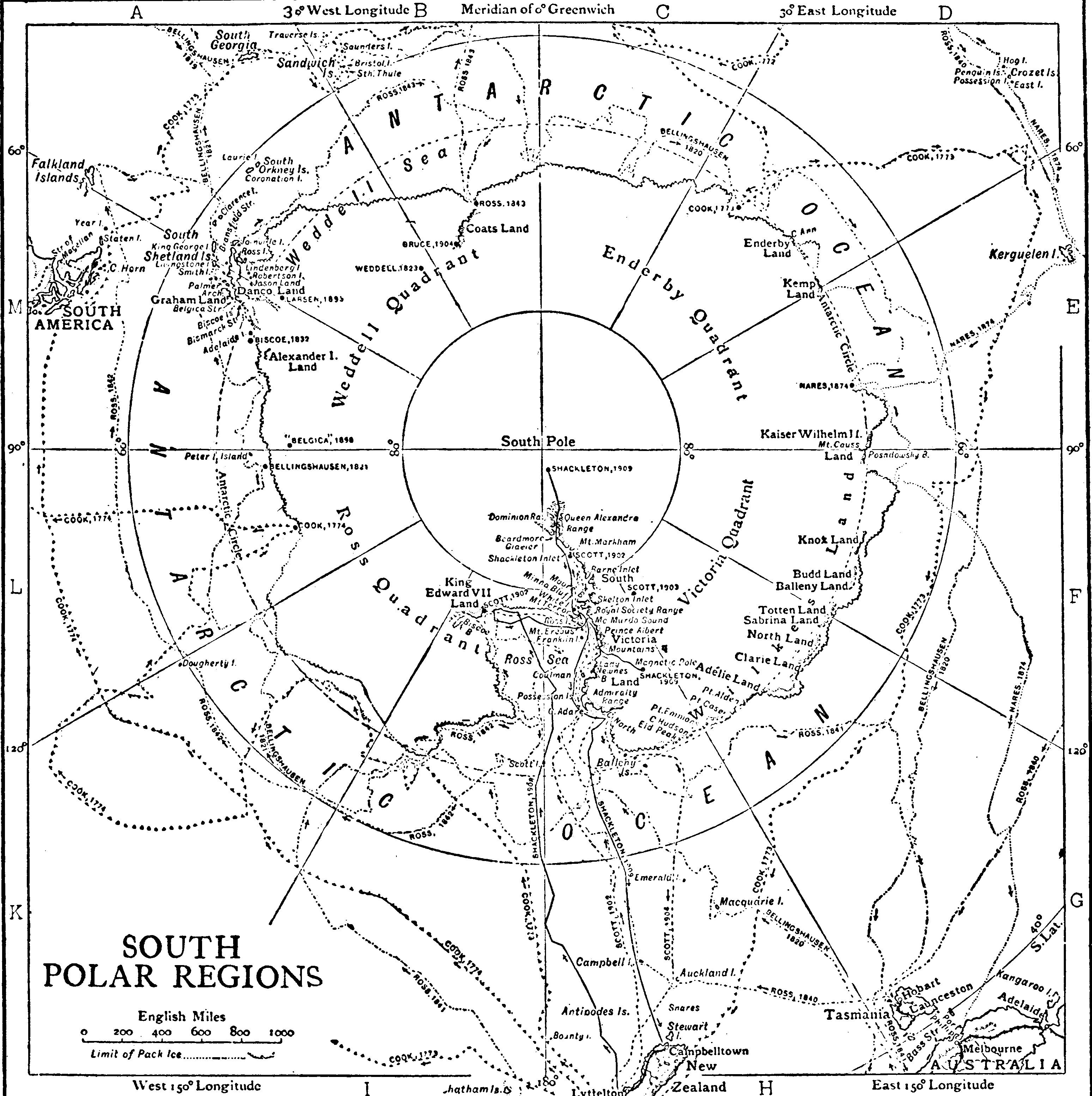
1911 South Polar Regions exploration map

In December 1839, as part of the United States Exploring Expedition of 1838–42 conducted by the United States Navy (sometimes called "the Wilkes Expedition"), an expedition sailed from Sydney, Australia, on the sloops-of-war USS Vincennes and USS Peacock, the brig USS Porpoise, the full-rigged ship Relief, and two schooners Sea Gull and USS Flying Fish. They sailed into the Antarctic Ocean, as it was then known, and reported the discovery "of an Antarctic continent west of the Balleny Islands" on 25 January 1840. That part of Antarctica was later named "Wilkes Land", a name it maintains to this day.

Explorer James Clark Ross passed through what is now known as the Ross Sea and discovered Ross Island (both of which were named for him) in 1841. He sailed along a huge wall of ice that was later named the Ross Ice Shelf. Mount Erebus and Mount Terror are named after two ships from his expedition: HMS Erebus and HMS Terror.

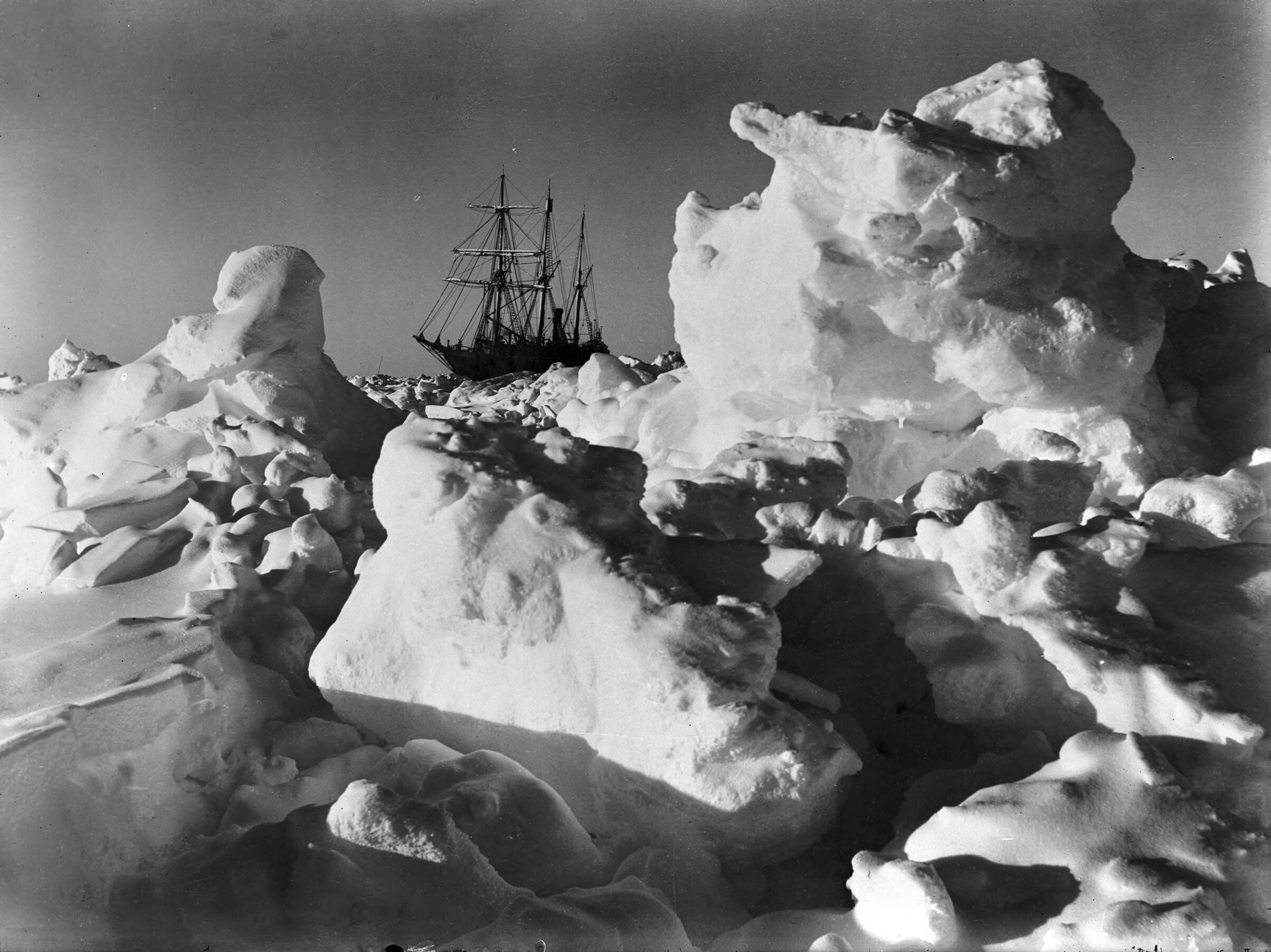
Frank Hurley: As time wore on it became more and more evident that the ship was doomed (Endurance trapped in pack ice), National Library of Australia.

The Imperial Trans-Antarctic Expedition of 1914, led by Ernest Shackleton, set out to cross the continent via the pole, but their ship, Endurance, was trapped and crushed by pack ice before they even landed. The expedition members survived after an epic journey on sledges over pack ice to Elephant Island. Then Shackleton and five others crossed the Southern Ocean, in an open boat called James Caird, and then trekked over South Georgia to raise the alarm at the whaling station Grytviken.

In 1946, US Navy Rear Admiral Richard E. Byrd and more than 4,700 military personnel visited the Antarctic in an expedition called Operation Highjump. Reported to the public as a scientific mission, the details were kept secret and it may have actually been a training or testing mission for the military. The expedition was, in both military and scientific planning terms, put together very quickly. The group contained an unusually high amount of military equipment, including an aircraft carrier, submarines, military support ships, assault troops and military vehicles. The expedition was planned to last for eight months but was unexpectedly terminated after only two months. With the exception of some eccentric entries in Admiral Byrd's diaries, no real explanation for the early termination has ever been officially given.

Captain Finn Ronne, Byrd's executive officer, returned to Antarctica with his own expedition in 1947–1948, with Navy support, three planes, and dogs. He disproved the notion that the continent was divided in two and established that East and West Antarctica was one single continent, i.e. that the Weddell Sea and the Ross Sea are not connected. The expedition explored and mapped large parts of Palmer Land and the Weddell Sea coastline, and identified the Ronne Ice Shelf, named by him for his wife Jackie Ronne. He covered 3,600 miles (5,790 km) by ski and dog sled – more than any other explorer in history. The Ronne Antarctic Research Expedition discovered and mapped the last unknown coastline in the world and was the first Antarctic expedition to ever include women.

=== Post-Antarctic Treaty ===
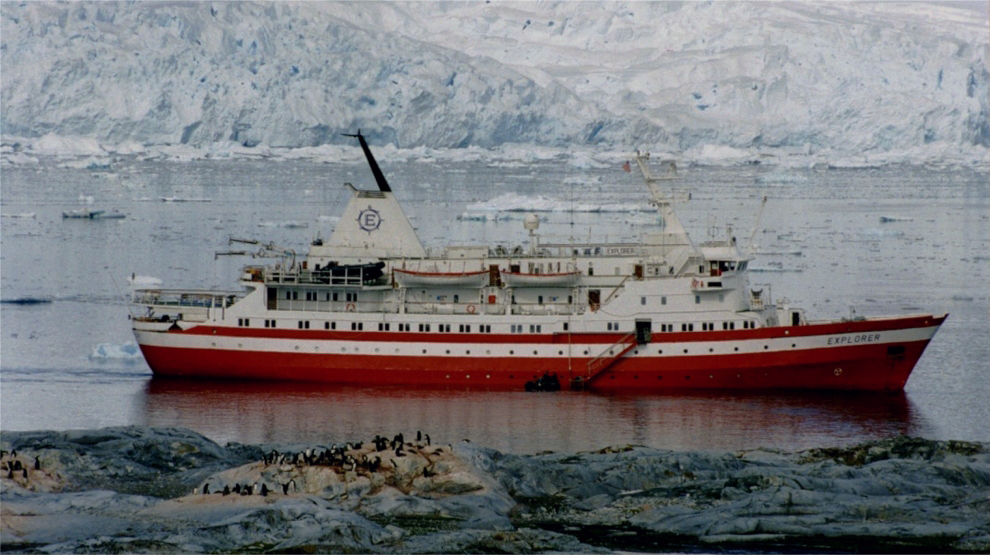
MS Explorer in Antarctica in January 1999. She sank on 23 November 2007 after hitting an iceberg.

The Antarctic Treaty was signed on 1 December 1959 and came into force on 23 June 1961. Among other provisions, this treaty limits military activity in the Antarctic to the support of scientific research.

The first person to sail single-handed to Antarctica was the New Zealander David Henry Lewis, in 1972, in a 10-metre (30 ft) steel sloop Ice Bird.

A baby, named Emilio Marcos de Palma, was born near Hope Bay on 7 January 1978, becoming the first baby born on the continent. He also was born further south than anyone in history.

The MV Explorer was a cruise ship operated by the Swedish explorer Lars-Eric Lindblad. Observers point to Explorer's 1969 expeditionary cruise to Antarctica as the frontrunner for today's sea-based tourism in that region. Explorer was the first cruise ship used specifically to sail the icy waters of the Antarctic Ocean and the first to sink there when she struck an unidentified submerged object on 23 November 2007, reported to be ice, which caused a 10 by 4 inches (25 by 10 cm) gash in the hull. Explorer was abandoned in the early hours of 23 November 2007 after taking on water near the South Shetland Islands in the Southern Ocean, an area which is usually stormy but was calm at the time. Explorer was confirmed by the Chilean Navy to have sunk at approximately position: 62° 24′ South, 57° 16′ West, in roughly 600 m of water.

British engineer Richard Jenkins designed an unmanned saildrone that completed the first autonomous circumnavigation of the Southern Ocean on 3 August 2019 after 196 days at sea.

The first completely human-powered expedition on the Southern Ocean was accomplished on 25 December 2019 by a team of rowers comprising captain Fiann Paul (Iceland), first mate Colin O'Brady (US), Andrew Towne (US), Cameron Bellamy (South Africa), Jamie Douglas-Hamilton (UK) and John Petersen (US).

== Geography ==
The Southern Ocean, geologically the youngest of the oceans, was formed when Antarctica and South America moved apart, opening the Drake Passage, roughly 30 million years ago. The separation of the continents allowed the formation of the Antarctic Circumpolar Current.

With a northern limit at 60°S, the Southern Ocean differs from the other oceans in that its largest boundary, the northern boundary, does not abut a landmass (as it did with the first edition of Limits of Oceans and Seas). Instead, the northern limit is with the Atlantic, Indian and Pacific Oceans.

One reason for considering it as a separate ocean stems from the fact that much of the water of the Southern Ocean differs from the water in the other oceans. Water gets transported around the Southern Ocean fairly rapidly because of the Antarctic Circumpolar Current which circulates around Antarctica. Water in the Southern Ocean south of, for example, New Zealand, resembles the water in the Southern Ocean south of South America more closely than it resembles the water in the Pacific Ocean.

The Southern Ocean has typical depths of between 4,000 and 5,000 m (13,000 and 16,000 ft) over most of its extent with only limited areas of shallow water. The Southern Ocean's greatest depth of 7,236 m (23,740 ft) occurs at the southern end of the South Sandwich Trench, at 60°00'S, 024°W. The Antarctic continental shelf appears generally narrow and unusually deep, its edge lying at depths up to 800 m (2,600 ft), compared to a global mean of 133 m (436 ft).

Equinox to equinox in line with the sun's seasonal influence, the Antarctic ice pack fluctuates from an average minimum of 2.6 million square kilometres (1.0×10^{6} sq mi) in March to about 18.8 million square kilometres (7.3×10^{6} sq mi) in September, more than a sevenfold increase in area.

=== Subdivisions ===
Seas that are parts of the Southern Ocean

Subdivisions of oceans are geographical features such as "seas", "straits", "bays", "channels", and "gulfs". There are many sudivisions of the Southern Ocean defined in the never-approved 2002 draft fourth edition of the IHO publication Limits of Oceans and Seas. In clockwise order these include (with sector):

- Weddell Sea (57°18'W – 12°16'E)
- King Haakon VII Sea (Note: Reservation by Norway: Norway recognizes the name Kong Håkon VII Hav, which covers the sea area adjacent to Dronning Maud Land and stretching from 20°W to 45°E.) (20°W – 45°E)
- Lazarev Sea (0° – 14°E)
- Riiser-Larsen Sea (14° – 30°E)
- Cosmonauts Sea (30° – 50°E)
- Cooperation Sea (59°34' – 85°E)
- Davis Sea (82° – 96°E)
- Mawson Sea (95°45' – 113°E)
- Dumont D'Urville Sea (140°E)
- Somov Sea (150° – 170°E)
- Ross Sea (166°E – 155°W)
- Amundsen Sea (102°20′ – 126°W)
- Bellingshausen Sea (57°18' – 102°20'W)
- Part of the Drake Passage (Note: The Drake Passage is situated between the southern and eastern extremities of South America and the South Shetland Islands, lying north of the Antarctic Peninsula.) (54° – 68°W)
- Bransfield Strait (54° – 62°W)
- Part of the Scotia Sea (Note: The Scotia Sea is an area defined by the southeastern extremity of South America and the South Shetland Islands on the west and by South Georgia and the South Sandwich Islands to the north and east. As they extend north of 60°S, Drake Passage and the Scotia Sea are also described as forming part of the South Atlantic Ocean.) (26°30' – 65°W)

A number of these such as the 2002 Russian-proposed "Cosmonauts Sea", "Cooperation Sea", and "Somov (mid-1950s Russian polar explorer) Sea" are not included in the 1953 IHO document which remains currently in force, because they received their names largely originated from 1962 onward. Leading geographic authorities and atlases do not use these latter three names, including the 2014 10th edition World Atlas from the United States' National Geographic Society and the 2014 12th edition of the British Times Atlas of the World, but Soviet and Russian-issued maps do.

=== Biggest seas ===
Top large seas:

1. Weddell Sea – 2,800,000 km^{2} (1,100,000 sq mi)
2. Somov Sea – 1,150,000 km^{2} (440,000 sq mi)
3. Riiser-Larsen Sea – 1,138,000 km^{2} (439,000 sq mi)
4. Lazarev Sea – 929,000 km^{2} (359,000 sq mi)
5. Scotia Sea – 900,000 km^{2} (350,000 sq mi)
6. Cosmonauts Sea – 699,000 km^{2} (270,000 sq mi)
7. Ross Sea – 637,000 km^{2} (246,000 sq mi)
8. Bellingshausen Sea – 487,000 km^{2} (188,000 sq mi)
9. Mawson Sea – 333,000 km^{2} (129,000 sq mi)
10. Cooperation Sea – 258,000 km^{2} (100,000 sq mi)
11. Amundsen Sea – 98,000 km^{2} (38,000 sq mi)
12. Davis Sea – 21,000 km^{2} (8,100 sq mi)
13. D'Urville Sea
14. King Haakon VII Sea

=== Natural resources ===
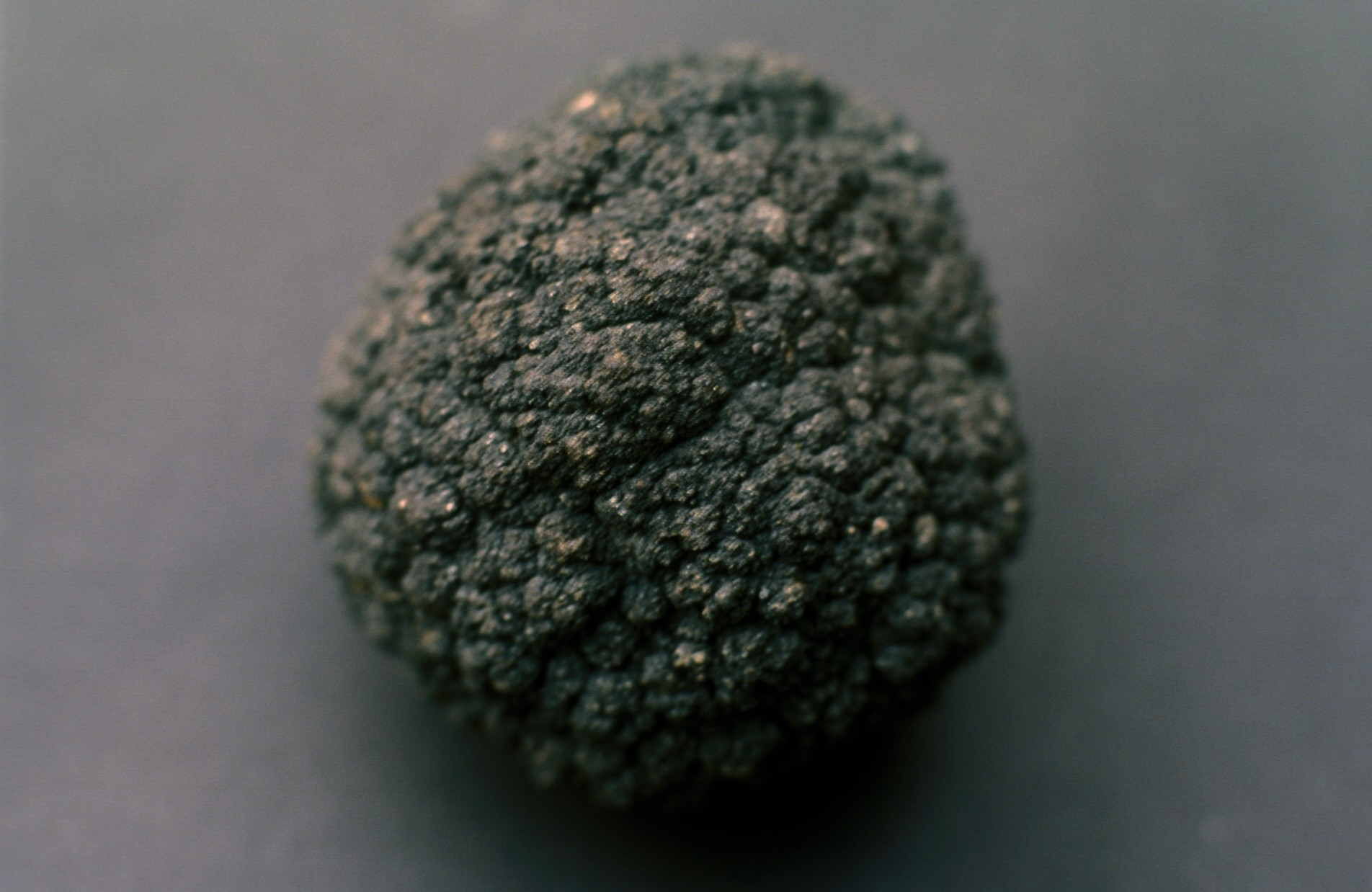
Manganese nodule

The Southern Ocean probably contains large, and possibly giant, oil and gas fields on the continental margin. Placer deposits, accumulation of valuable minerals such as gold, formed by gravity separation during sedimentary processes are also expected to exist in the Southern Ocean.

Manganese nodules are expected to exist in the Southern Ocean. Manganese nodules are rock concretions on the sea bottom formed of concentric layers of iron and manganese hydroxides around a core. The core may be microscopically small and is sometimes completely transformed into manganese minerals by crystallization. Interest in the potential exploitation of polymetallic nodules generated a great deal of activity among prospective mining consortia in the 1960s and 1970s.

The icebergs that form each year around in the Southern Ocean hold enough fresh water to meet the needs of every person on Earth for several months. For several decades there have been proposals, none yet to be feasible or successful, to tow Southern Ocean icebergs to more arid northern regions (such as Australia) where they can be harvested.

=== Natural hazards ===
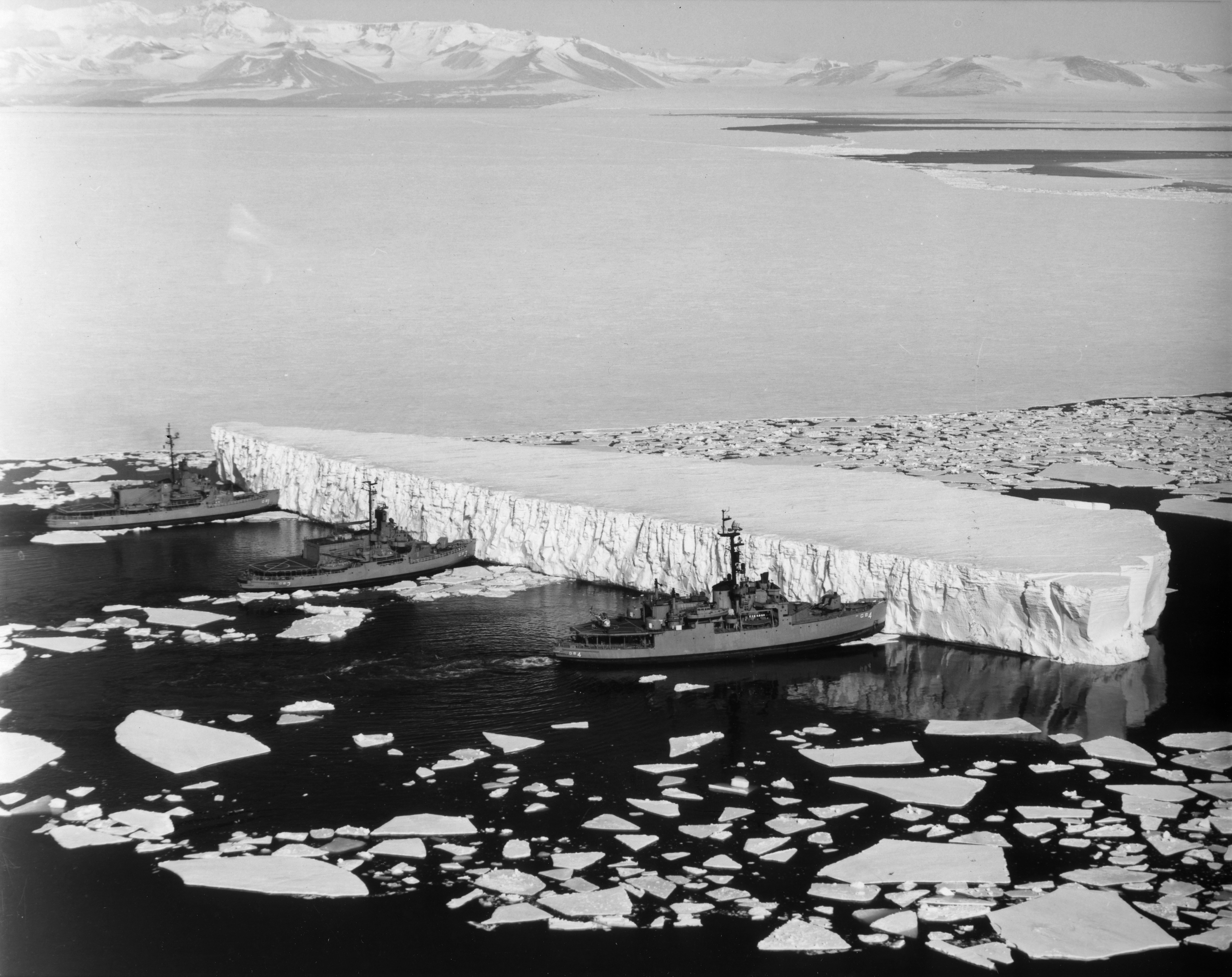
An iceberg being pushed out of a shipping lane by (L to R) USS Burton Island, USS Atka, and USS Glacier near McMurdo Station, Antarctica, 1965

Icebergs can occur at any time of year throughout the ocean. Some may have drafts up to several hundred meters; smaller icebergs, iceberg fragments and sea-ice (generally 0.5 to 1 m thick) also pose problems for ships. The deep continental shelf has a floor of glacial deposits varying widely over short distances.

Sailors know latitudes from 40 to 70 degrees south as the "Roaring Forties", "Furious Fifties" and "Shrieking Sixties" due to high winds and large waves that form as winds blow around the entire globe unimpeded by any land-mass. Icebergs, especially in May to October, make the area even more dangerous. The remoteness of the region makes sources of search and rescue scarce.

== Physical oceanography ==
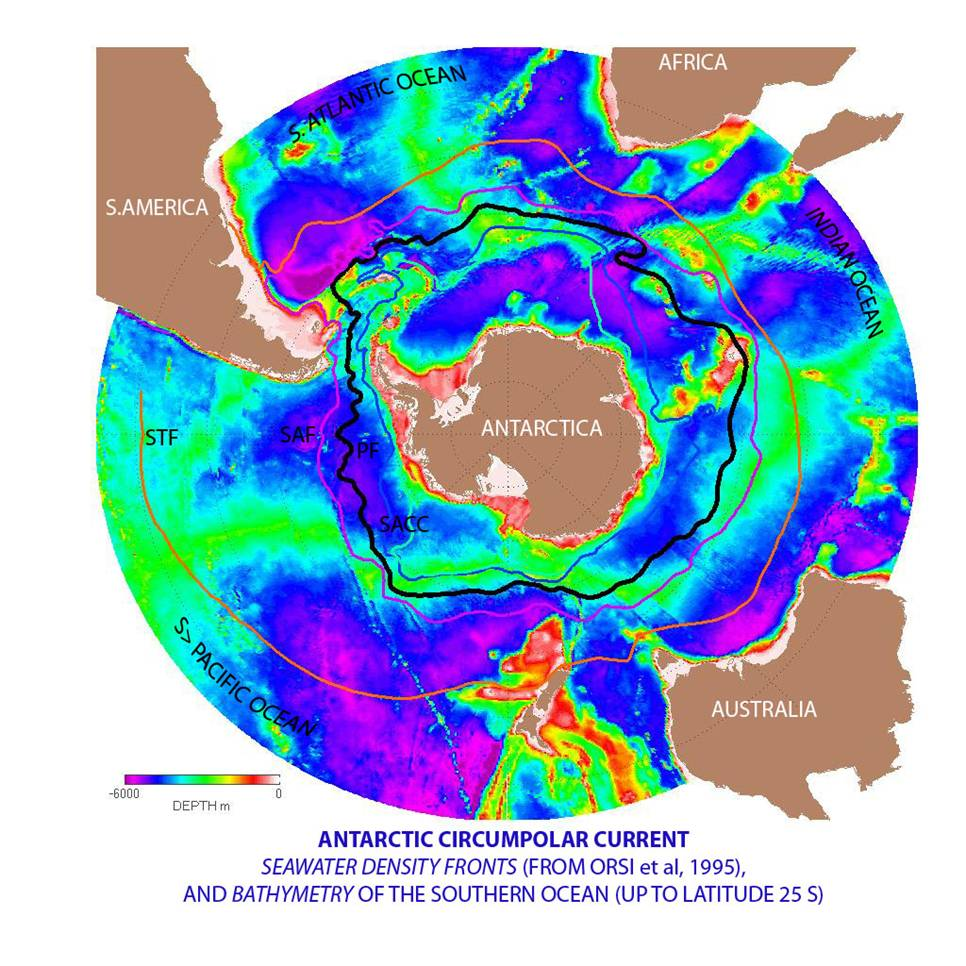
The Antarctic Circumpolar Current (ACC) is the strongest current system in the world oceans, linking the Atlantic, Indian and Pacific basins.

=== Antarctic Circumpolar Current and Antarctic Convergence ===
While the Southern is the second smallest ocean it contains the highly energetic Antarctic Circumpolar Current which moves perpetually eastward, chasing and joining itself. At 21,000 km (13,000 mi) in length, it comprises the world's longest ocean current, transporting 130 million cubic metres per second (4.6×10^{9} cu ft/s) of water – 100 times the flow of all the world's rivers.

Several processes operate along the coast of Antarctica to produce, in the Southern Ocean, types of water masses not produced elsewhere in the oceans of the Southern Hemisphere. One of these is the Antarctic Bottom Water, a very cold, highly saline, dense water that forms under sea ice. Another is Circumpolar Deep Water, a mixture of Antarctic Bottom Water and North Atlantic Deep Water.

Associated with the Circumpolar Current is the Antarctic Convergence encircling Antarctica, where cold northward-flowing Antarctic waters meet the relatively warmer waters of the subantarctic, Antarctic waters predominantly sink beneath subantarctic waters, while associated zones of mixing and upwelling create a zone very high in nutrients. These nurture high levels of phytoplankton with associated copepods and Antarctic krill, and resultant foodchains supporting fish, whales, seals, penguins, albatrosses and a wealth of other species.

The Antarctic Convergence is considered to be the best natural definition of the northern extent of the Southern Ocean.

Upwelling in the Southern Ocean

=== Upwelling ===
Large-scale upwelling is found in the Southern Ocean. Strong westerly (eastward) winds blow around Antarctica, driving a significant flow of water northward. This is actually a type of coastal upwelling. Since there are no continents in a band of open latitudes between South America and the tip of the Antarctic Peninsula, some of this water is drawn up from great depths. In many numerical models and observational syntheses, the Southern Ocean upwelling represents the primary means by which deep dense water is brought to the surface. Shallower, wind-driven upwelling is also found off the west coasts of North and South America, northwest and southwest Africa, and southwest and southeast Australia, all associated with oceanic subtropical high pressure circulations.

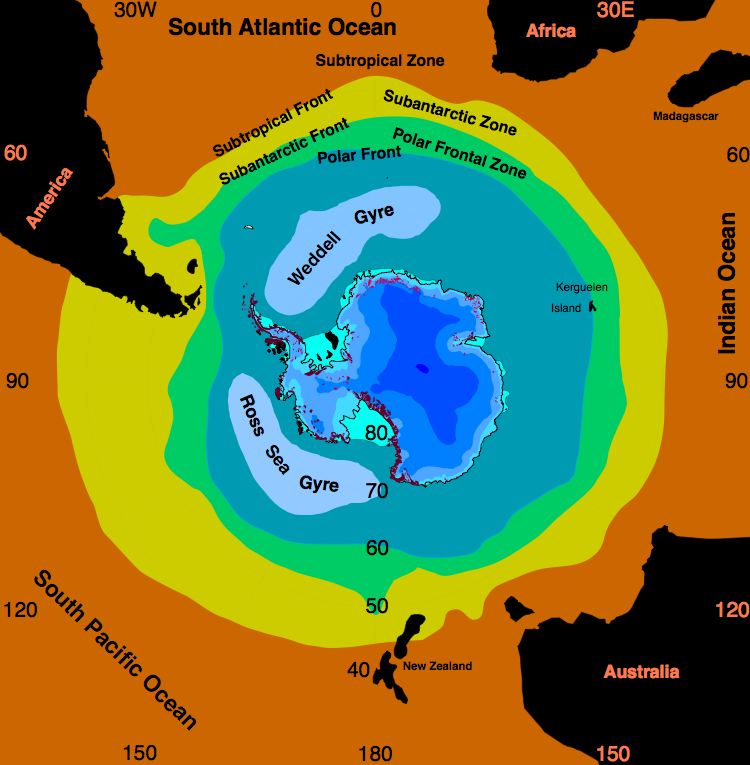
Location of the Southern Ocean gyres

=== Ross and Weddell gyres ===
The Ross Gyre and Weddell Gyre are two gyres that exist within the Southern Ocean. The gyres are located in the Ross Sea and Weddell Sea respectively, and both rotate clockwise. The gyres are formed by interactions between the Antarctic Circumpolar Current and the Antarctic Continental Shelf.

Sea ice has been noted to persist in the central area of the Ross Gyre. There is some evidence that global warming has resulted in some decrease of the salinity of the waters of the Ross Gyre since the 1950s.

Due to the Coriolis effect acting to the left in the Southern Hemisphere and the resulting Ekman transport away from the centres of the Weddell Gyre, these regions are very productive due to upwelling of cold, nutrient rich water.

=== Observation ===
Observation of the Southern Ocean is coordinated through the Southern Ocean Observing System (SOOS). This provides access to meta data for a significant proportion of the data collected in the regions over the past decades including hydrographic measurements and ocean currents. The data provision is set up to emphasize records that are related to Essential Ocean Variables (EOVs) for the ocean region south of 40°S.

== Climate ==
Sea temperatures vary from about −2 to 10 °C (28 to 50 °F). Cyclonic storms travel eastward around the continent and frequently become intense because of the temperature contrast between ice and open ocean. The ocean from about latitude 40 south to the Antarctic Circle has the strongest average winds found anywhere on Earth. In winter the ocean freezes outward to 65 degrees south latitude in the Pacific sector and 55 degrees south latitude in the Atlantic sector, lowering surface temperatures well below 0 degrees Celsius. At some coastal points, persistent intense drainage winds from the interior keep the shoreline ice-free throughout the winter.

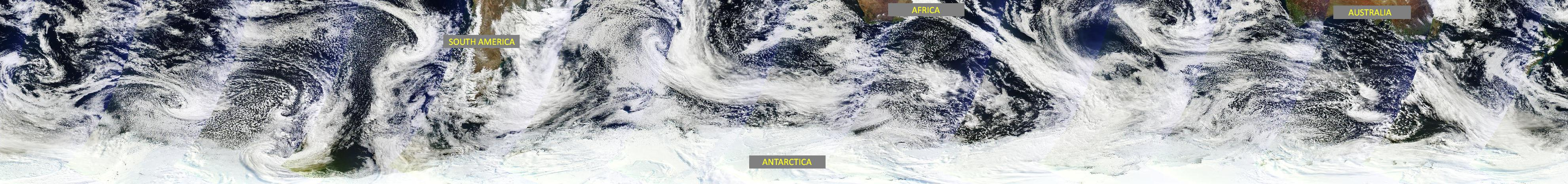
Clouds over the Southern Ocean, with continent labels

=== Change ===
Southern Ocean overturning circulation (sometimes referred to as the Southern Meridional overturning circulation (SMOC) or Antarctic overturning circulation) is the southern half of a global thermohaline circulation, which connects different water basins across the global ocean. Its better-known northern counterpart is the Atlantic meridional overturning circulation (AMOC). This circulation operates when certain currents send warm, oxygenated, nutrient-poor water into the deep ocean (downwelling), while the cold, oxygen-limited, nutrient-rich water travels upwards (or upwells) at specific points. Thermohaline circulation transports not only massive volumes of warm and cold water across the planet, but also dissolved oxygen, dissolved organic carbon and other nutrients such as iron. Thus, both halves of the circulation have a great effect on Earth's energy budget and oceanic carbon cycle, and so play an essential role in the Earth's climate system.

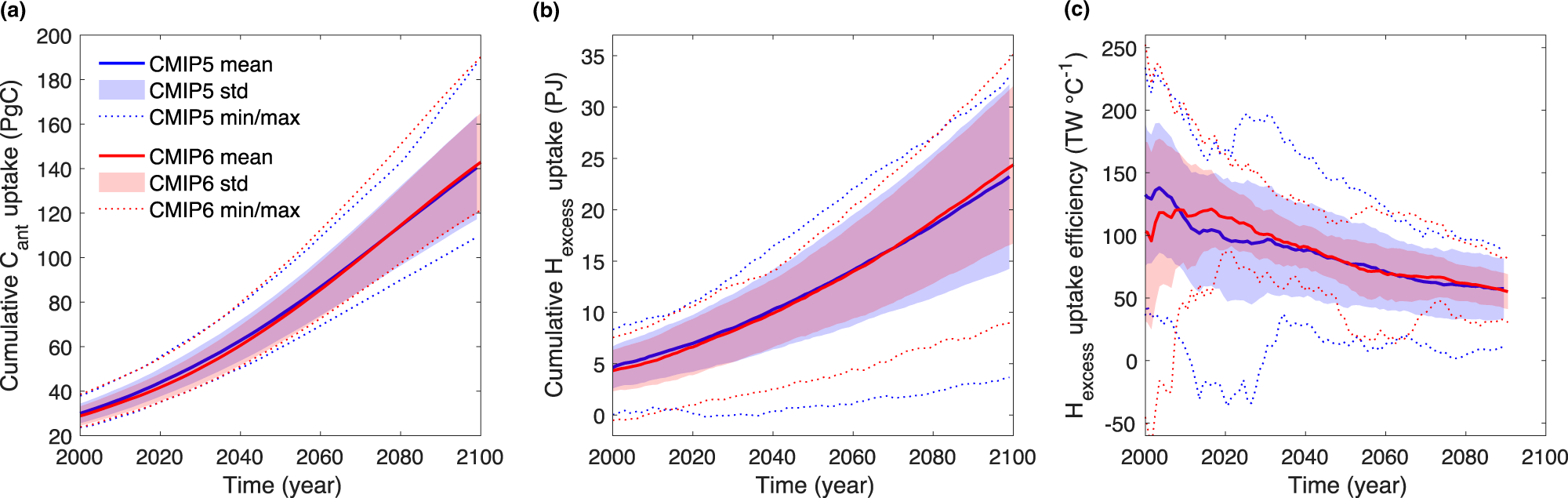
Even under the most intense climate change scenario, which is currently considered unlikely, the Southern Ocean would continue to function as a strong sink in the 21st century, and take up an increasing amount of carbon dioxide (left) and heat (middle). However, it would take up a smaller fraction of heat per every additional degree of warming than it does now (right), as well as a smaller fraction of emissions.

As human-caused greenhouse gas emissions cause increased warming, one of the most notable effects of climate change on oceans is the increase in ocean heat content, which accounted for over 90% of the total global heating since 1971. Much of this increase has occurred in the extratropical Southern Hemisphere ocean south of 30°S. In West Antarctica, the temperature in the upper layer of the ocean has warmed 1 °C (1.8 °F) since 1955, and the Antarctic Circumpolar Current (ACC) is also warming faster than the global average. This warming directly affects the flow of warm and cold water masses which make up the overturning circulation, and it also reduces the cover of sea ice (which is highly reflective and so elevates the albedo of Earth's surface) in the Southern Hemisphere, as well as mass balance of Antarctica's ice shelves and peripheral glaciers. For these reasons, climate models consistently show that the year when global warming will reach 2 °C (3.6 °F) (inevitable in all climate change scenarios where greenhouse gas emissions have not been strongly lowered) depends on the status of the circulation more than any other factor besides the emissions themselves.

Greater warming of this ocean water increases ice loss from Antarctica, and also generates more fresh meltwater, at a rate of 1100–1500 billion tons (GT) per year. This meltwater from the Antarctic ice sheet then mixes back into the Southern Ocean, making its water fresher. This freshening of the Southern Ocean causes increased stratification and stabilization of its layers, and this has the single largest impact on the long-term properties of Southern Ocean circulation. These changes in the Southern Ocean cause the upper cell circulation to speed up, accelerating the flow of major currents, while the lower cell circulation slows down, as it is dependent on the highly saline Antarctic bottom water, which already appears to have been observably weakened by the freshening, in spite of the limited recovery during 2010s. Since the 1970s, the upper cell has strengthened by 3–4 sverdrup (Sv; represents a flow of 1 million cubic meters per second), or 50–60% of its flow, while the lower cell has weakened by a similar amount, but because of its larger volume, these changes represent a 10–20% weakening. However, they were not fully caused by climate change, as the natural cycle of Interdecadal Pacific Oscillation had also played an important role.

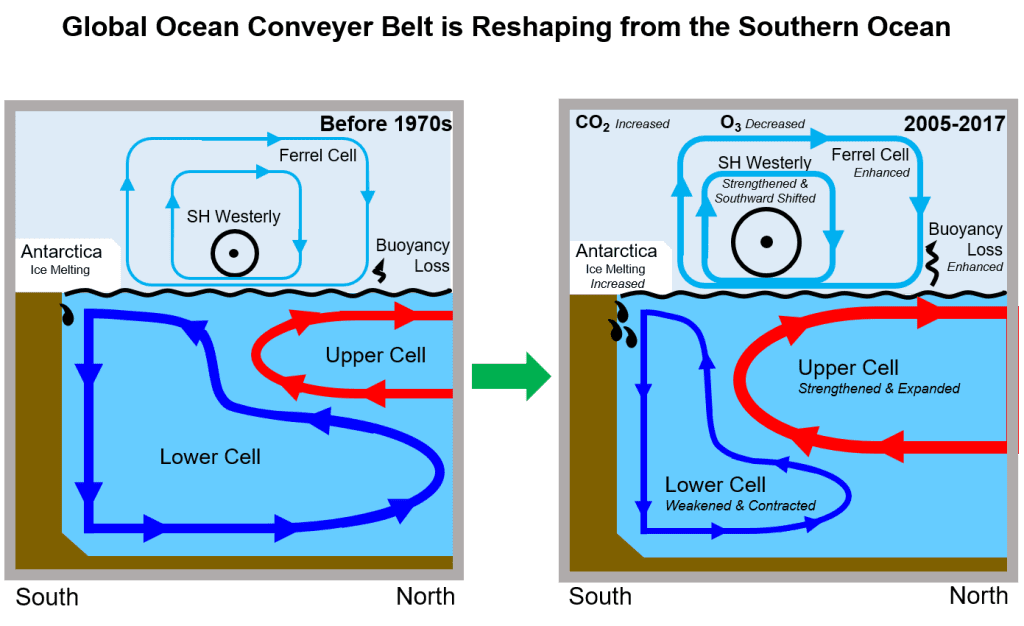
Since the 1970s, the upper cell of the circulation has strengthened, while the lower cell weakened.

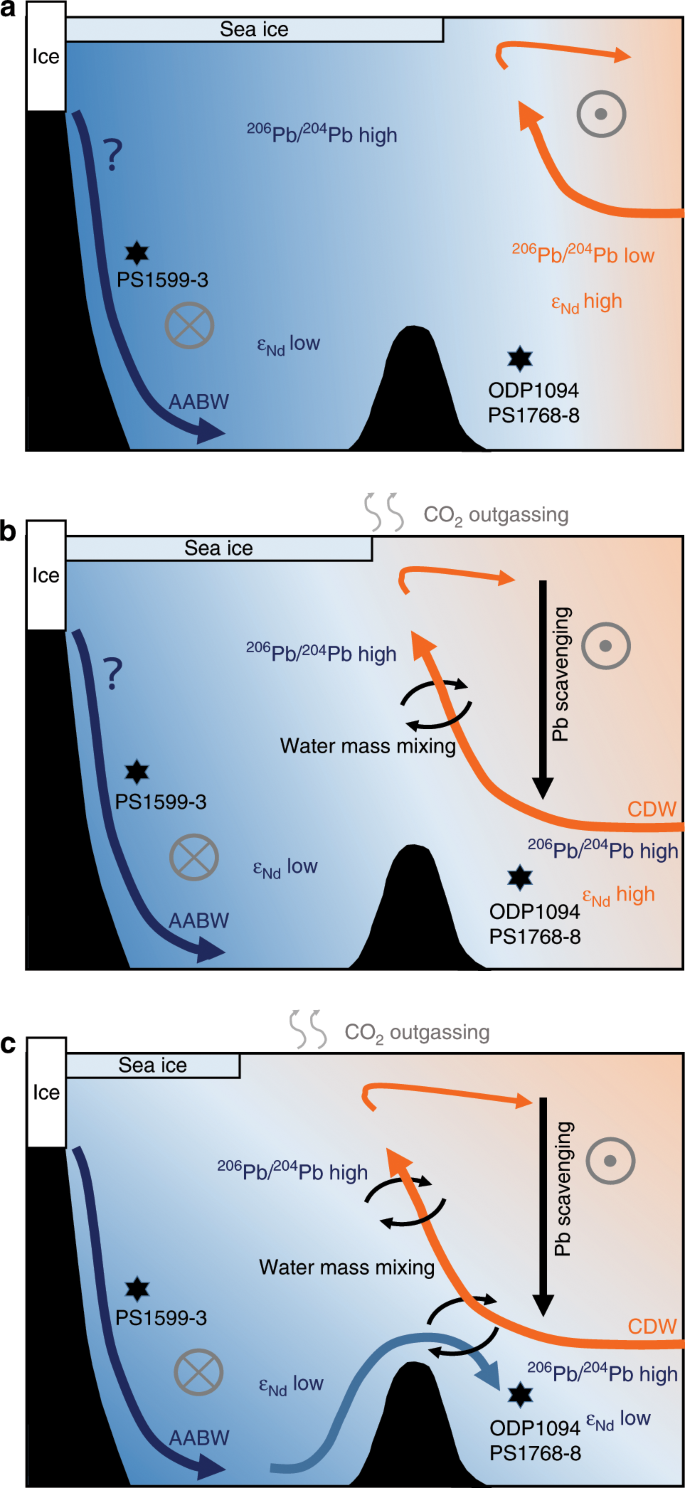
Evidence suggests that the Antarctic bottom water requires a temperature range close to current conditions to be at full strength. During the Last Glacial Maximum (a cold period), it was too weak to flow out of the Weddell Sea and the overturning circulation was much weaker than now. It was also weaker during the periods warmer than now.

Similar processes are taking place with Atlantic meridional overturning circulation (AMOC), which is also affected by the ocean warming and by meltwater flows from the declining Greenland ice sheet. It is possible that both circulations may not simply continue to weaken in response to increased warming and freshening, but eventually collapse to a much weaker state outright, in a way which would be difficult to reverse and constitute an example of tipping points in the climate system. There is paleoclimate evidence for the overturning circulation being substantially weaker than now during past periods that were both warmer and colder than now. However, Southern Hemisphere is only inhabited by 10% of the world's population, and the Southern Ocean overturning circulation has historically received much less attention than the AMOC. Consequently, while multiple studies have set out to estimate the exact level of global warming which could result in AMOC collapsing, the timeframe over which such collapse may occur, and the regional impacts it would cause, much less equivalent research exists for the Southern Ocean overturning circulation as of the early 2020s. There has been a suggestion that its collapse may occur between 1.7 °C (3.1 °F) and 3 °C (5.4 °F), but this estimate is much less certain than for many other tipping points.

The impacts of Southern Ocean overturning circulation collapse have also been less closely studied, though scientists expect them to unfold over multiple centuries. A notable example is the loss of nutrients from Antarctic bottom water diminishing ocean productivity and ultimately the state of Southern Ocean fisheries, potentially leading to the extinction of some species of fish, and the collapse of some marine ecosystems. Reduced marine productivity would also mean that the ocean absorbs less carbon (though not within the 21st century), which could increase the ultimate long-term warming in response to anthropogenic emissions (thus raising the overall climate sensitivity) and/or prolong the time warming persists before it starts declining on the geological timescales. There is also expected to be a decline in precipitation in the Southern Hemisphere countries like Australia, with a corresponding increase in the Northern Hemisphere. However, the decline or an outright collapse of the AMOC would have similar but opposite impacts, and the two would counteract each other up to a point. Both impacts would also occur alongside the other effects of climate change on the water cycle and effects of climate change on fisheries.

== Biodiversity ==
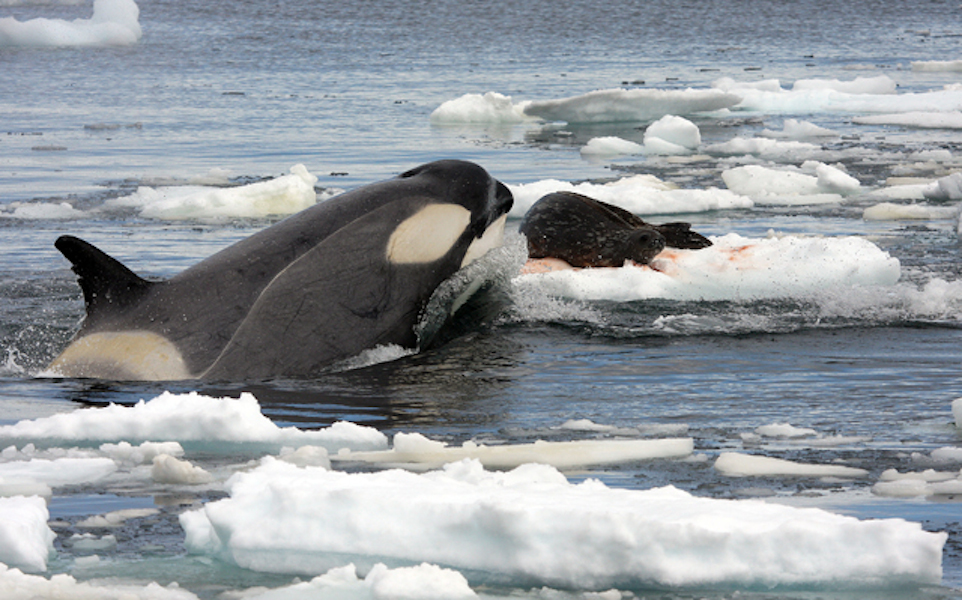
Orca (Orcinus orca) hunting a Weddell seal in the Southern Ocean

=== Animals ===
A variety of marine animals exist and rely, directly or indirectly, on the phytoplankton in the Southern Ocean. Antarctic sea life includes penguins, blue whales, orcas, colossal squids and fur seals. The emperor penguin is the only penguin that breeds during the winter in Antarctica, while the Adélie penguin breeds farther south than any other penguin. The rockhopper penguin has distinctive feathers around the eyes, giving the appearance of elaborate eyelashes. King penguins, chinstrap penguins, and gentoo penguins also breed in the Antarctic.

The Antarctic fur seal was very heavily hunted in the 18th and 19th centuries for its pelt by sealers from the United States and the United Kingdom. The Weddell seal, a "true seal", is named after Sir James Weddell, commander of British sealing expeditions in the Weddell Sea. Antarctic krill, which congregates in large schools, is the keystone species of the ecosystem of the Southern Ocean, and is an important food organism for whales, seals, leopard seals, fur seals, squid, icefish, penguins, albatrosses and many other birds.

The benthic communities of the seafloor are diverse and dense, with up to 155,000 animals found in 1 square metre (10.8 ft^{2}). As the seafloor environment is very similar all around the Antarctic, hundreds of species can be found all the way around the mainland, which is a uniquely wide distribution for such a large community. Deep-sea gigantism is common among these animals.

A census of sea life carried out during the International Polar Year and which involved some 500 researchers was released in 2010. The research is part of the global Census of Marine Life (CoML) and has disclosed some remarkable findings. More than 235 marine organisms live in both polar regions, having bridged the gap of 12,000 km (7,500 mi). Large animals such as some cetaceans and birds make the round trip annually. More surprising are small forms of life such as mudworms, sea cucumbers and free-swimming snails found in both polar oceans. Various factors may aid in their distribution – fairly uniform temperatures of the deep ocean at the poles and the equator which differ by no more than 5 °C (9.0 °F), and the major current systems or marine conveyor belt which transport egg and larva stages. Among smaller marine animals generally assumed to be the same in the Antarctica and the Arctic, more detailed studies of each population have often—but not always—revealed differences, showing that they are closely related cryptic species rather than a single bipolar species.

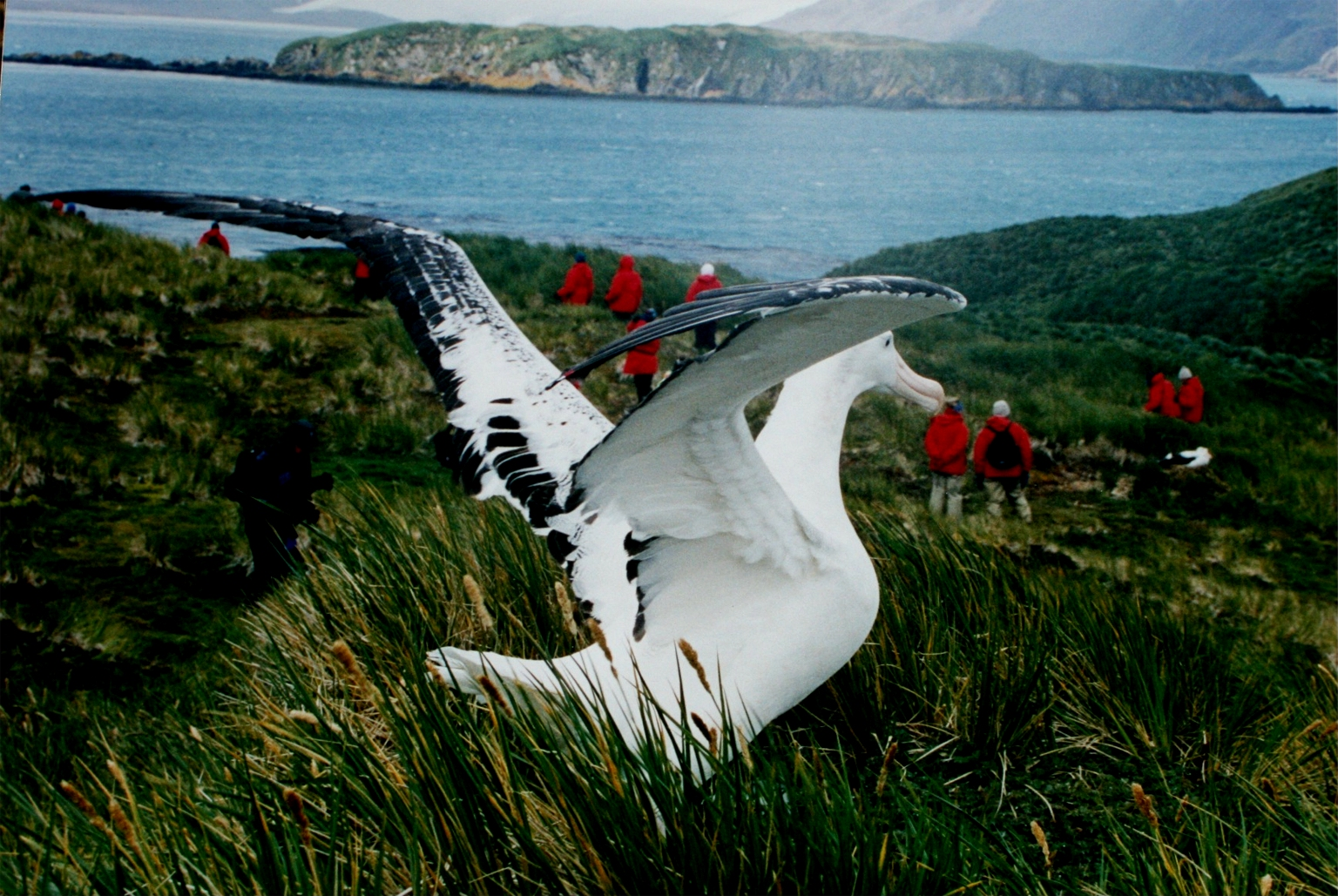
A wandering albatross (Diomedea exulans) on South Georgia

=== Birds ===
The rocky shores of mainland Antarctica and its offshore islands provide nesting space for over 100 million birds every spring. These nesters include species of albatrosses, petrels, skuas, gulls and terns. The insectivorous South Georgia pipit is endemic to South Georgia and some smaller surrounding islands. Freshwater ducks inhabit South Georgia and the Kerguelen Islands.

The flightless penguins are all located in the Southern Hemisphere, with the greatest concentration located on and around Antarctica. Four of the 18 penguin species live and breed on the mainland and its close offshore islands. Another four species live on the subantarctic islands. Emperor penguins have four overlapping layers of feathers, keeping them warm. They are the only Antarctic animal to breed during the winter.

=== Fish ===
There are relatively few fish species in few families in the Southern Ocean. The most species-rich family are the snailfish (Liparidae), followed by the cod icefish (Nototheniidae) and eelpout (Zoarcidae). Together the snailfish, eelpouts and notothenioids (which includes cod icefish and several other families) account for almost 9/10 of the more than 320 described fish species of the Southern Ocean (tens of undescribed species also occur in the region, especially among the snailfish). Southern Ocean snailfish are generally found in deep waters, while the icefish also occur in shallower waters.

==== Icefish ====
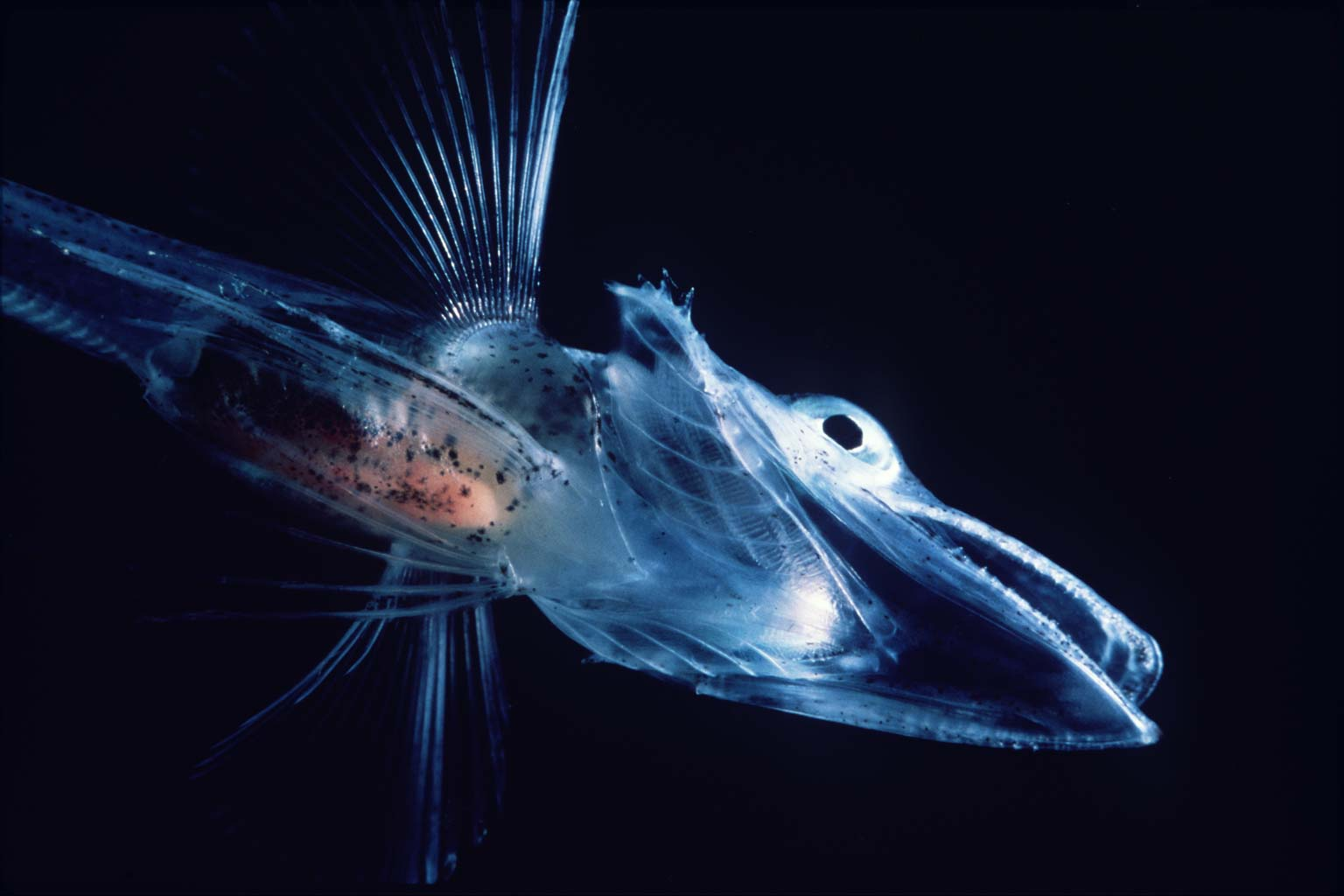
Fish of the Notothenioidei suborder, such as this young icefish, are mostly restricted to the Antarctic and Subantarctic.

Cod icefish (Nototheniidae), as well as several other families, are part of the Notothenioidei suborder, collectively sometimes referred to as icefish. The suborder contains many species with antifreeze proteins in their blood and tissue, allowing them to live in water that is around or slightly below 0 °C (32 °F). Antifreeze proteins are also known from Southern Ocean snailfish.

The crocodile icefish (family Channichthyidae), also known as white-blooded fish, are only found in the Southern Ocean. They lack hemoglobin in their blood, resulting in their blood being colourless. One Channichthyidae species, the mackerel icefish (Champsocephalus gunnari), was once the most common fish in coastal waters less than 400 metres (1,312 ft) deep, but was overfished in the 1970s and 1980s. Schools of icefish spend the day at the seafloor and the night higher in the water column eating plankton and smaller fish.

There are two species from the genus Dissostichus, the Antarctic toothfish (Dissostichus mawsoni) and the Patagonian toothfish (Dissostichus eleginoides). These two species live on the seafloor 100–3,000 metres (328–9,843 ft) deep, and can grow to around 2 metres (7 ft) long weighing up to 100 kilograms (220 lb), living up to 45 years. The Antarctic toothfish lives close to the Antarctic mainland, whereas the Patagonian toothfish lives in the relatively warmer subantarctic waters. Toothfish are commercially fished, and overfishing has reduced toothfish populations.

Another abundant fish group is the genus Notothenia, which like the Antarctic toothfish have antifreeze in their bodies.

An unusual species of icefish is the Antarctic silverfish (Pleuragramma antarcticum), which is the only truly pelagic fish in the waters near Antarctica.

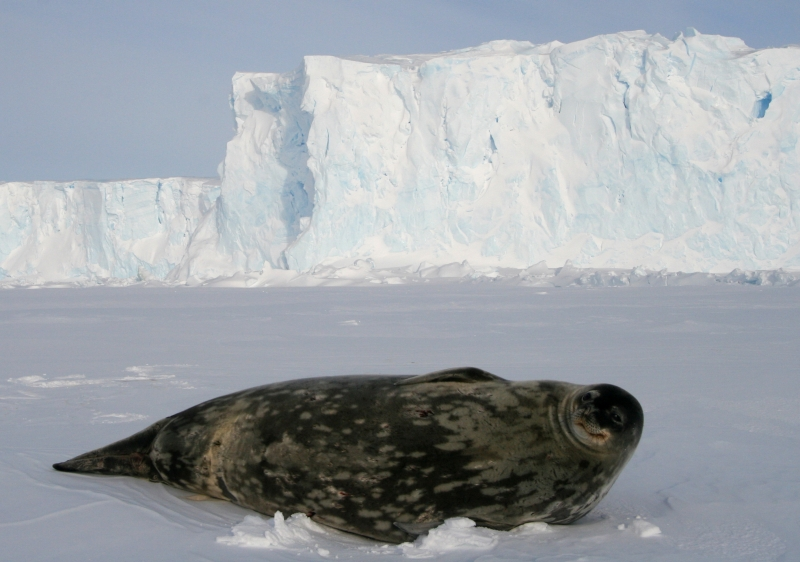
Weddell seals (Leptonychotes weddellii) are the most southerly of Antarctic mammals.

=== Mammals ===
Six pinniped species inhabit Antarctica. The largest, the elephant seal (Mirounga leonina), can reach up to 4,000 kilograms (8,818 lb), while females of the smallest, the Antarctic fur seal (Arctophoca gazella), reach only 150 kilograms (331 lb). These two species live north of the sea ice, and breed in harems on beaches. The other four species can live on the sea ice. Crabeater seals (Lobodon carcinophagus) and Weddell seals (Leptonychotes weddellii) form breeding colonies, whereas leopard seals (Hydrurga leptonyx) and Ross seals (Ommatophoca rossii) live solitary lives. Although these species hunt underwater, they breed on land or ice and spend a great deal of time there, as they have no terrestrial predators.

The four species that inhabit sea ice are thought to make up 50% of the total biomass of the world's seals. Crabeater seals have a population of around 15 million, making them one of the most numerous large animals on the planet. The New Zealand sea lion (Phocarctos hookeri), one of the rarest and most localised pinnipeds, breeds almost exclusively on the subantarctic Auckland Islands, although historically it had a wider range. Out of all permanent mammalian residents, the Weddell seals live the furthest south.

There are 10 cetacean species found in the Southern Ocean: six baleen whales, and four toothed whales. The largest of these, the blue whale (Balaenoptera musculus), grows to 24 metres (79 ft) long weighing 84 tonnes. Many of these species are migratory, and travel to tropical waters during the Antarctic winter.

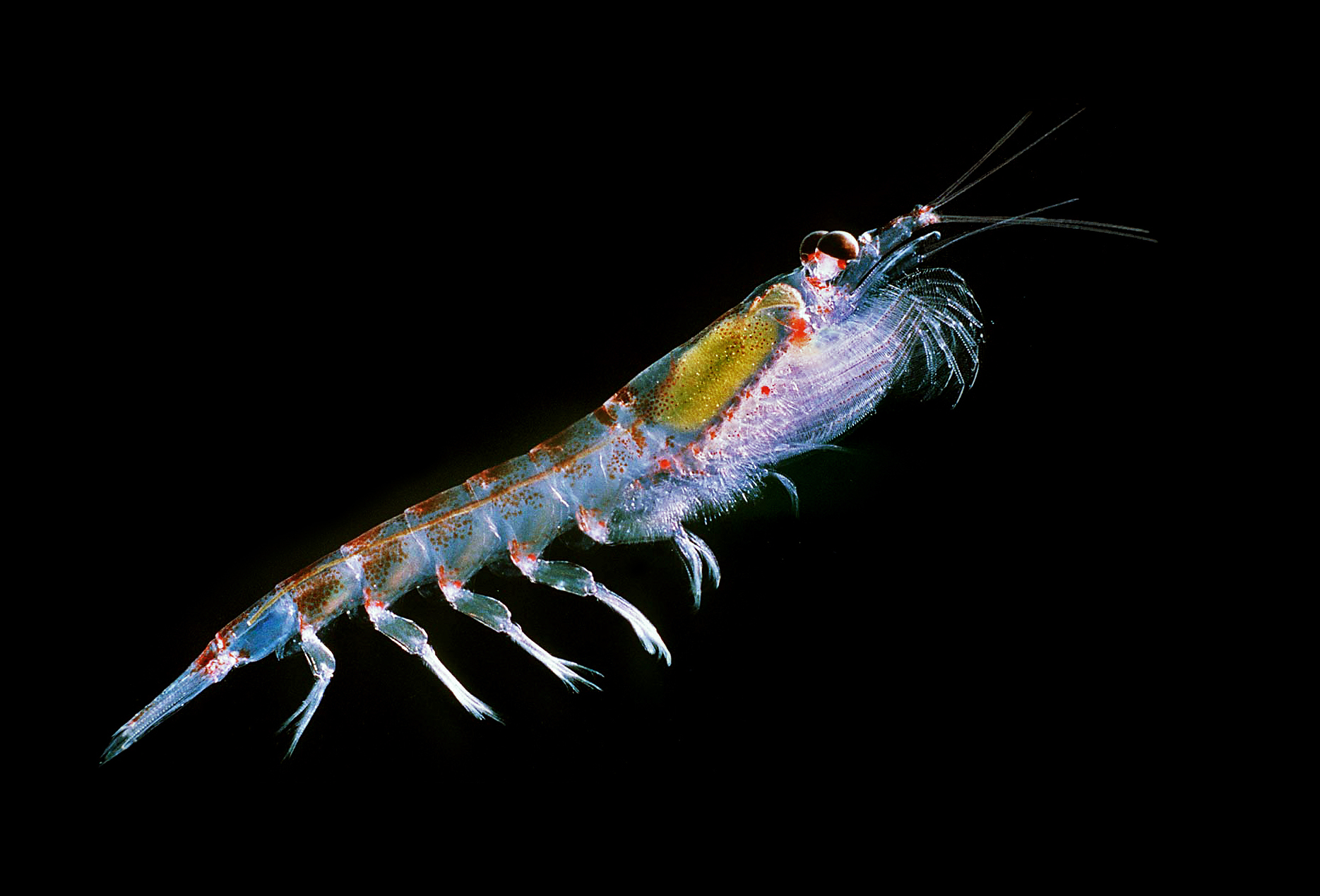
Antarctic krill (Euphausia superba) are a keystone species of the food web.

=== Invertebrates ===
==== Arthropods ====
Five species of krill, small free-swimming crustaceans, have been found in the Southern Ocean. The Antarctic krill (Euphausia superba) is one of the most abundant animal species on earth, with a biomass of around 500 million tonnes. Each individual is 6 centimetres (2.4 in) long and weighs over 1 gram (0.035 oz). The swarms that form can stretch for kilometres, with up to 30,000 individuals per 1 cubic metre (35 ft^{3}), turning the water red. Swarms usually remain in deep water during the day, ascending during the night to feed on plankton. Many larger animals depend on krill for their own survival. During the winter when food is scarce, adult Antarctic krill can revert to a smaller juvenile stage, using their own body as nutrition.

Many benthic crustaceans have a non-seasonal breeding cycle, and some raise their young in a brood pouch. Glyptonotus antarcticus is an unusually large benthic isopod, reaching 20 centimetres (8 in) in length weighing 70 grams (2.47 oz). Amphipods are abundant in soft sediments, eating a range of items, from algae to other animals. The amphipods are highly diverse with more than 600 recognized species found south of the Antarctic Convergence and there are indications that many undescribed species remain. Among these are several "giants", such as the iconic epimeriids that are up to 8 cm (3.1 in) long.

Slow moving sea spiders are common, sometimes growing as large as a human hand. They feed on the corals, sponges, and bryozoans that litter the seabed.

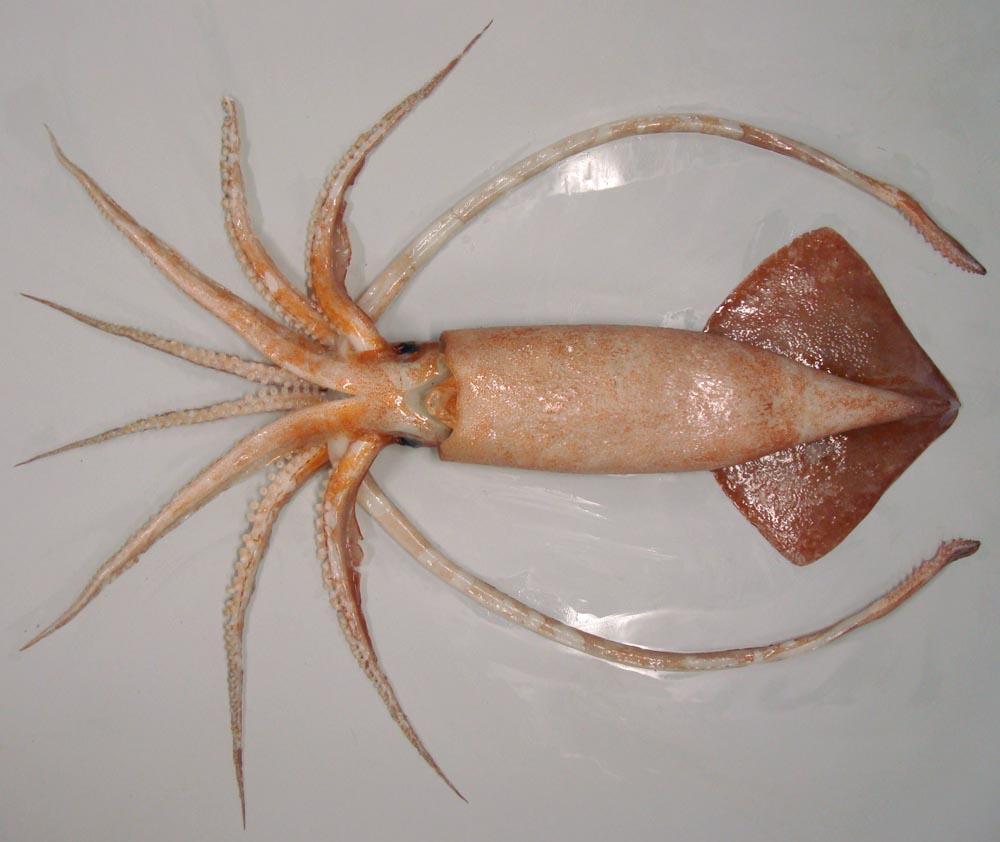
A female warty squid (Moroteuthis ingens)

==== Molluscs, urchins, squid and sponges ====
Many aquatic molluscs are present in Antarctica. Bivalves such as Adamussium colbecki move around on the seafloor, while others such as Laternula elliptica live in burrows filtering the water above.

There are around 70 cephalopod species in the Southern Ocean, the largest of which is the colossal squid (Mesonychoteuthis hamiltoni), which at up to 14 metres (46 ft) is among the largest invertebrate in the world. Squid makes up most of the diet of some animals, such as grey-headed albatrosses and sperm whales, and the warty squid (Moroteuthis ingens) is one of the subantarctic's most preyed upon species by vertebrates.

The sea urchin genus Abatus burrow through the sediment eating the nutrients they find in it. Two species of salps are common in Antarctic waters: Salpa thompsoni and Ihlea racovitzai. Salpa thompsoni is found in ice-free areas, whereas Ihlea racovitzai is found in the high-latitude areas near ice. Due to their low nutritional value, they are normally only eaten by fish, with larger animals such as birds and marine mammals only eating them when other food is scarce.

Antarctic sponges are long-lived and sensitive to environmental changes due to the specificity of the symbiotic microbial communities within them. As a result, they function as indicators of environmental health.

== Environment ==
Increased solar ultraviolet radiation resulting from the Antarctic ozone hole has reduced marine primary productivity (phytoplankton) by as much as 15% and has started damaging the DNA of some fish. Illegal, unreported and unregulated fishing, especially the landing of an estimated five to six times more Patagonian toothfish than the regulated fishery, likely affects the sustainability of the stock. Long-line fishing for toothfish causes a high incidence of seabird mortality.

=== International agreements ===
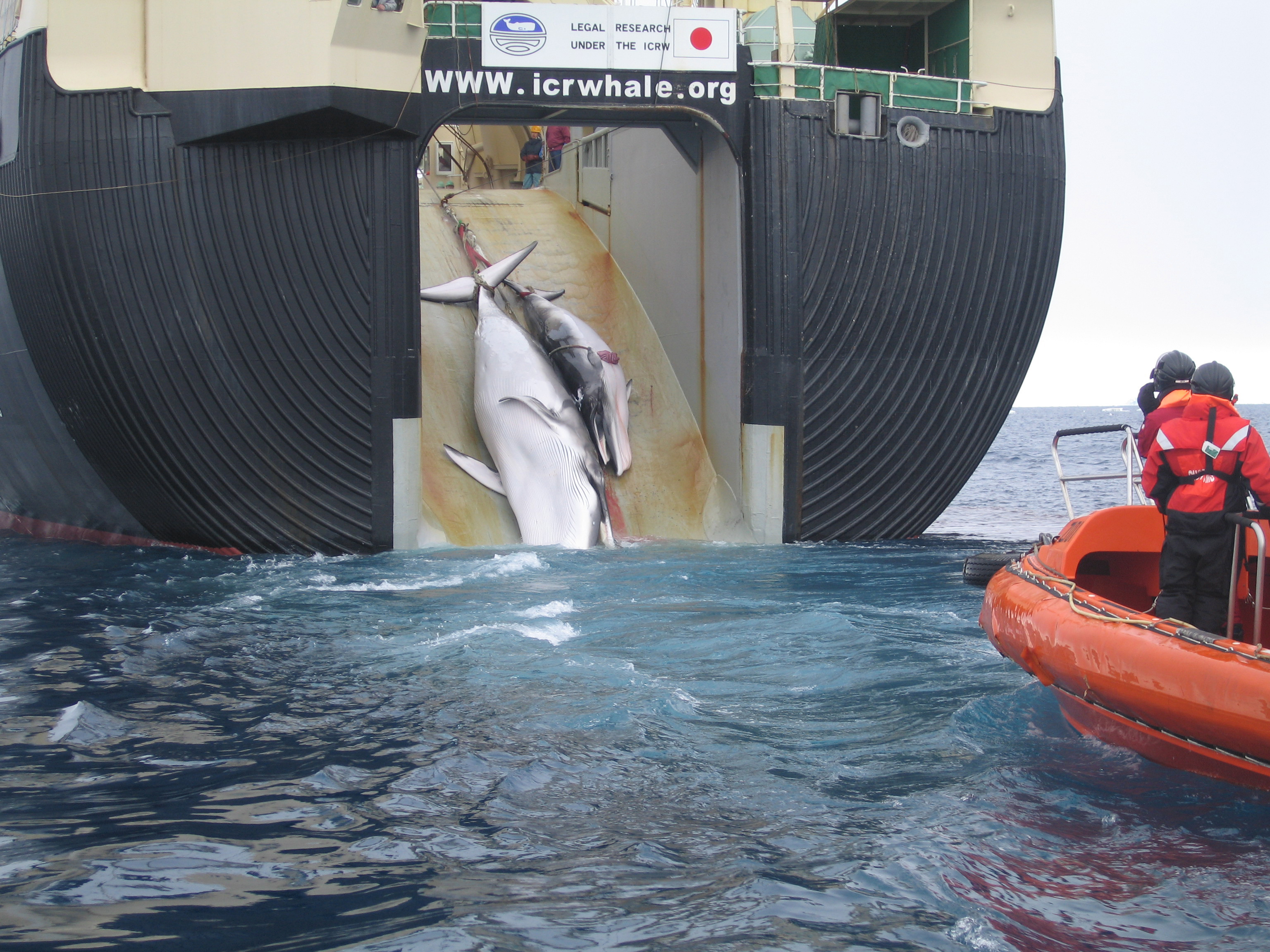
An adult and sub-adult Minke whale are dragged aboard the Japanese whaling vessel Nisshin Maru.

All international agreements regarding the world's oceans apply to the Southern Ocean. It is also subject to several regional agreements:

The Southern Ocean Whale Sanctuary of the International Whaling Commission (IWC) prohibits commercial whaling south of 40 degrees south (south of 60 degrees south between 50 degrees and 130 degrees west). Japan regularly does not recognize this provision, because the sanctuary violates IWC charter. Since the scope of the sanctuary is limited to commercial whaling, in regard to its whaling permit and whaling for scientific research, a Japanese fleet carried out an annual whale-hunt in the region. On 31 March 2014, the International Court of Justice ruled that Japan's whaling program, which Japan has long claimed is for scientific purposes, was a cloak for commercial whaling, and no further permits would be granted.

The Convention for the Conservation of Antarctic Seals is part of the Antarctic Treaty System. It was signed at the conclusion of a multilateral conference in London on 11 February 1972.

The Convention for the Conservation of Antarctic Marine Living Resources is part of the Antarctic Treaty System. It entered into force on 7 April 1982 with a goal to preserve marine life and environmental integrity in and near Antarctica. It was established largely due to concerns that an increase in krill catches in the Southern Ocean could seriously impact populations of other marine life which are dependent upon krill for food.

Many nations prohibit the exploration for and the exploitation of mineral resources south of the fluctuating Antarctic Convergence, which lies in the middle of the Antarctic Circumpolar Current and serves as the dividing line between the very cold polar surface waters to the south and the warmer waters to the north. The Antarctic Treaty covers the portion of the globe south of 60 degrees south; it prohibits new claims to Antarctica.

The Convention for the Conservation of Antarctic Marine Living Resources applies to the area south of 60° South latitude as well as the areas further north up to the limit of the Antarctic Convergence.

== Economy ==
Between 1 July 1998 and 30 June 1999, fisheries landed 119,898 tonnes (118,004 long tons; 132,165 short tons), of which 85% consisted of krill and 14% of Patagonian toothfish. International agreements came into force in late 1999 to reduce illegal, unreported, and unregulated fishing, which in the 1998–99 season landed five to six times more Patagonian toothfish than the regulated fishery.

== Ports and harbors ==
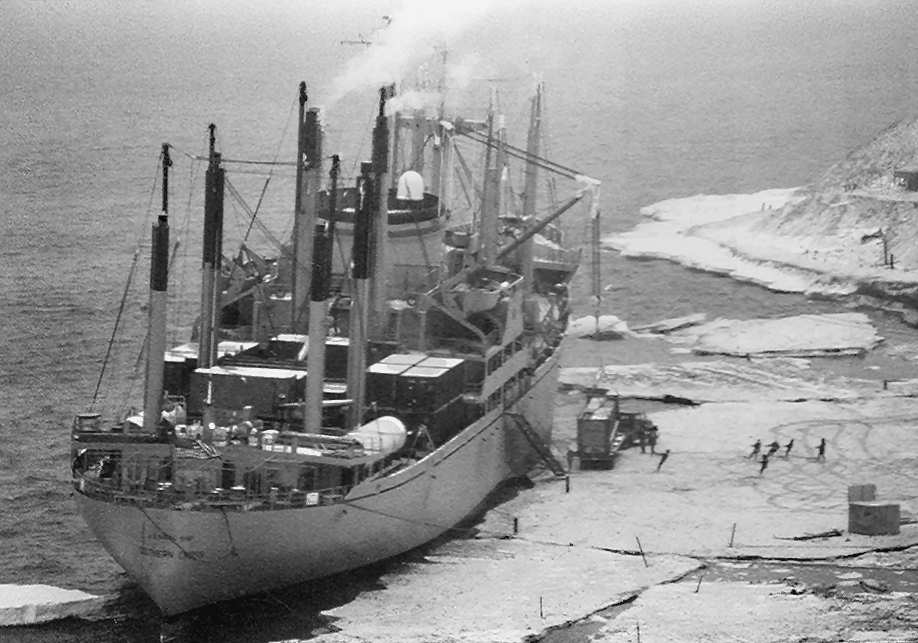
Severe cracks in an ice pier in use for four seasons at McMurdo Station slowed cargo operations in 1983 and proved a safety hazard.

Major operational ports include: Rothera Station, Palmer Station, Villa Las Estrellas, Esperanza Base, Mawson Station, McMurdo Station, and offshore anchorages in Antarctica.

Few ports or harbors exist on the southern (Antarctic) coast of the Southern Ocean, since ice conditions limit use of most shores to short periods in midsummer; even then some require icebreaker escort for access. Most Antarctic ports are operated by government research stations and, except in an emergency, remain closed to commercial or private vessels; vessels in any port south of 60 degrees south are subject to inspection by Antarctic Treaty observers.

The Southern Ocean's southernmost port operates at McMurdo Station at 77°50′S 166°40′E. Winter Quarters Bay forms a small harbor, on the southern tip of Ross Island where a floating ice pier makes port operations possible in summer. Operation Deep Freeze personnel constructed the first ice pier at McMurdo in 1973.

Based on the original 1928 IHO delineation of the Southern Ocean (and the 1937 delineation if the Great Australian Bight is considered integral), Australian ports and harbors between Cape Leeuwin and Cape Otway on the Australian mainland and along the west coast of Tasmania would also be identified as ports and harbors existing in the Southern Ocean. These would include the larger ports and harbors of Albany, Thevenard, Port Lincoln, Whyalla, Port Augusta, Port Adelaide, Portland, Warrnambool, and Macquarie Harbour.

Even though organizers of several yacht races define their routes as involving the Southern Ocean, the actual routes don't enter the actual geographical boundaries of the Southern Ocean. The routes involve instead South Atlantic, South Pacific and Indian Ocean.

== See also ==
- Borders of the oceans
- List of Antarctic and subantarctic islands
- List of seamounts in the Southern Ocean
- Seven Seas
- International Bathymetric Chart of the Southern Ocean
