= American Mediterranean Sea =

Mediterranean dilution basin covering the Caribbean Sea and the Gulf of Mexico

Coordinates: 18°N 80°W

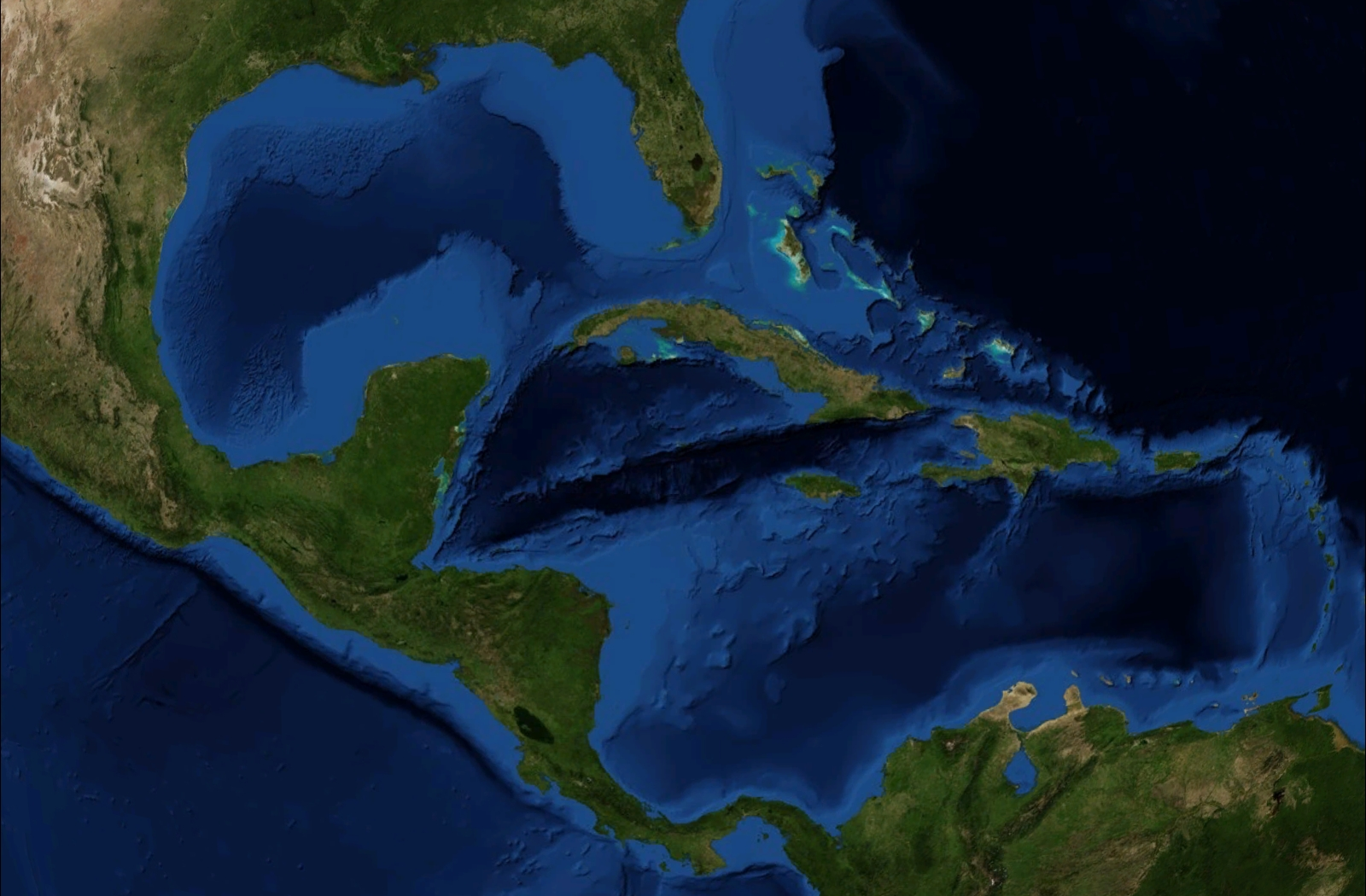
- Composite June 2008 satellite image of the American Mediterranean Sea

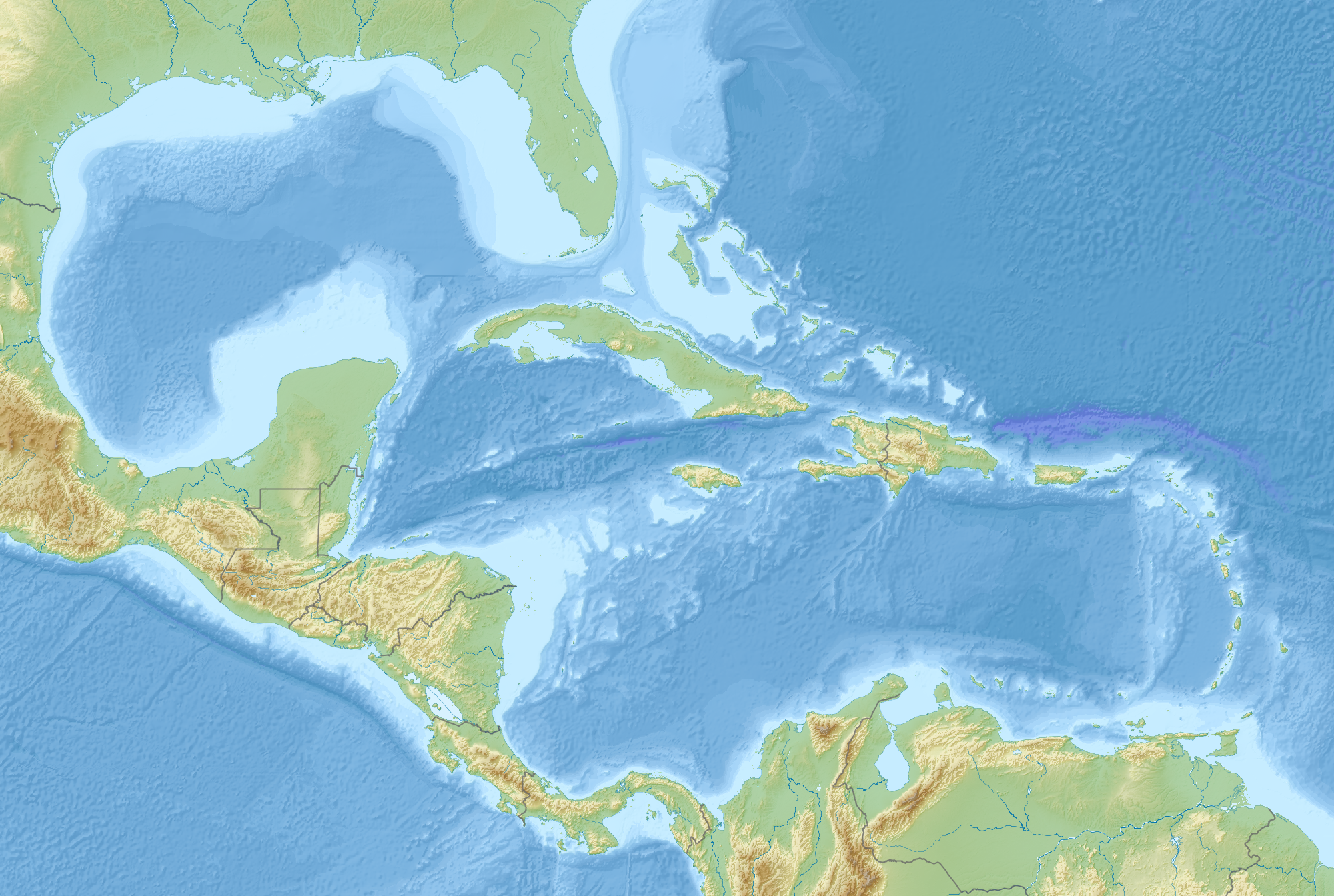
- Location within Middle America
- Location: The Americas
- Type: Sea
- Basin countries: List: Anguilla Antigua and Barbuda Aruba Bahamas Barbados Belize British Virgin Islands Caribbean Netherlands Cayman Islands Colombia Costa Rica Cuba Curaçao Dominica Dominican Republic Grenada Guadeloupe Guatemala Haiti Honduras Jamaica Martinique Mexico Montserrat Nicaragua Panama Puerto Rico Saint Barthélemy Saint Kitts and Nevis Saint Lucia Saint Martin Saint Vincent and the Grenadines Sint Maarten Trinidad and Tobago Turks and Caicos Islands United States United States Virgin Islands Venezuela
- Surface area: 4,319,000 km^{2} (1,668,000 sq mi)
- Average depth: 2,216 m (7,270 ft)
- Max. depth: 7,686 m (25,217 ft)
- Islands: 1,100+
- Settlements: List: Barranquilla Barcelona Beaumont Cancun Cartagena Colón Corpus Christi Cumaná Havana Houston Maracaibo Miami Mobile New Orleans Porlamar San Juan Santa Marta Santo Domingo Tampa Veracruz

The American Mediterranean Sea is a scientific name for the mediterranean dilution basin that includes the Caribbean Sea and the Gulf of Mexico. The name, which has been employed particularly by German oceanographers, is not recognized by the International Hydrographic Organization, the United States Geological Survey or other international hydrological bodies.

The American Mediterranean has a surface area of 4,319,000 km^{2} and an average depth of 2,216 metres (7,270 ft).

Its basins include the Mexico Basin, the Cayman Trough, the Yucatan Basin, the Columbian Basin, the Venezuelan Basin and the Grenada Basin.

The American Mediterranean Sea is considered a semi-enclosed sea. In addition to numerous large and small groups of islands, small islands, and islets, it includes the large islands of Cuba, bordering the Caribbean Sea and the Gulf of Mexico, Hispaniola, Jamaica, and Puerto Rico. All of these islands are among the West Indian islands that separate the American Mediterranean Sea from the Atlantic Ocean.

Between these islands, the American Mediterranean Sea contains the following straits: the Florida Straits, the Windward Passage (Paso de los Vientos), the Mona Passage (Canal de la Mona), the Anegada Passage to Guadeloupe Passage, and the Dominica Passage to Martinique Passage. Within the Mediterranean, the Straits of Yucatán connect the Gulf of Mexico with the Caribbean, and since the inauguration of the Panama Canal in August 1914, it has been connected to the Pacific.

== Watershed ==
The American Mediterranean Sea drains approximately 6,200,000 km^{2} (2,400,000 sq mi) in North America and Caribbean South America; it is the 2nd largest sea watershed. The watershed depends on South American water bodies such as the Magdalena River with 257,440 km^{2} (99,397 sq mi), as well as the Guajira Peninsula and the Gulf of Venezuela. Central American drainages include those of/to the Belize River, Gulf of Honduras, Caratasca Lagoon, Nicaraguan Caribbean Lowlands, and the Colorado River in Costa Rica. In North America, the sea mostly drains the Mississippi River basin of 3,202,230 km^{2} (1,236,388 sq mi), to the east of the Continental Divide of the Americas, while it drains approximately 610,000 km^{2} (235,000 sq mi) from the Rio Grande and 198,000 km^{2} (76,300 sq mi) from the Yucatan Peninsula.

== See also ==
- Arctic Ocean
- Australasian Mediterranean Sea
- Mediterranean Sea
