= Largest rivers =

See one of the following:

- List of river systems by length
- List of rivers by discharge
- List of drainage basins by area
