= Grenada Basin =

Sedimentary Basin in Caribbean Sea

The Grenada Basin is an 11–15 km thick back-arc sedimentary basin located in the southeastern region of the Caribbean Sea. It is bordered by the Lesser Antilles in the north, south, and east, and the Aves Ridge in the west.

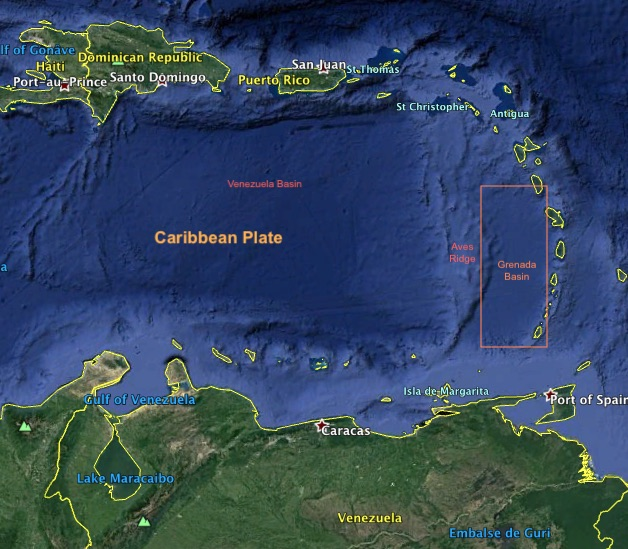
The Grenada Basin is located in the southeast corner of the Caribbean Plate and is bordered by the Aves Ridge, an extinct volcanic island arc, and the Lesser Antilles, an active volcanic island arc.

== Geologic setting ==
The Grenada Basin has no active spreading center. The basin geology is influence by the interactions between the Caribbean Plate and the North and South American Plates. The eastern edge of the Caribbean plate is marked by subduction zones, with the North American plate and South American plate subducting beneath the Caribbean plate. The Caribbean plate is currently migrating eastward at 20mm/yr relative to the North and South American plates. The morphology of the basin floor is divided into 2 regions, the northern and southern. The northern regions is described as "rugged, with a system of spurs and valleys running down from the Lesser Antilles arc" and the southern region is characterized by smooth, near horizontal surfaces. The morphology of the north is due to its proximity to the North American-Caribbean subduction zone. The basin itself is tectonically stable with earthquakes occurring outside the basin. Most earthquakes are concentrated north of the basin, near Martinique and Dominica, and occur at depths between 5–150 km.

== Tectonic history ==
The Caribbean plate is a large igneous providence (LIP) composed of flood basalt that is believed to have come from the eastern Pacific oceanic plateau. The Caribbean LIP eventually separated from the Pacific plate and wandered eastward to its current position between 100-70 million years ago. The basins of the region, which include the Venezuelan, Grenada, and Tobago Trough, may have been one continuous basin, but the creation of the Avez Ridge, a now extinct volcanic arc, divided the region, creating the Venezuelan Basin and the Grenada Basin. Another volcanic arc, the Lesser Antilles, later separated the Grenada Basin from the Tobago Basin.

It is also proposed that the basin was formed during the early Cenozoic. Some models suggest basin formation by north-south extension or east-west extension.

=== East-west extension ===
This extension model is described by an eastward shift of the North American-Caribbean subduction zone, followed by a westward shift of the Aves Ridge.

=== North-south extension ===
This extension model is described by an oblique convergence of the South American plate and the Caribbean plate, causing the basin to be formed by right lateral shear.

== Depositional history ==
Basin structure can only be inferred though seismic surveys as the basin has yet to be drilled. Aiken proposes that the basin is divided into 3 megasequences. Sediment grouped in Megasequence 1 was deposited in the Paleogene and was primarily sourced from South America and the Aves Ridge Sediment grouped in Megasequence 2 was deposited in the early to mid-Miocene and was also sourced from South America. Sediment from Megasequence 3 was deposited during the and was sourced from the Lesser Antilles and pelagic sediment.
