= Australasian Mediterranean Sea =

Sea located in the area between Australasia and Southeast Asia

Coordinates: 6.5°S 123.9°E

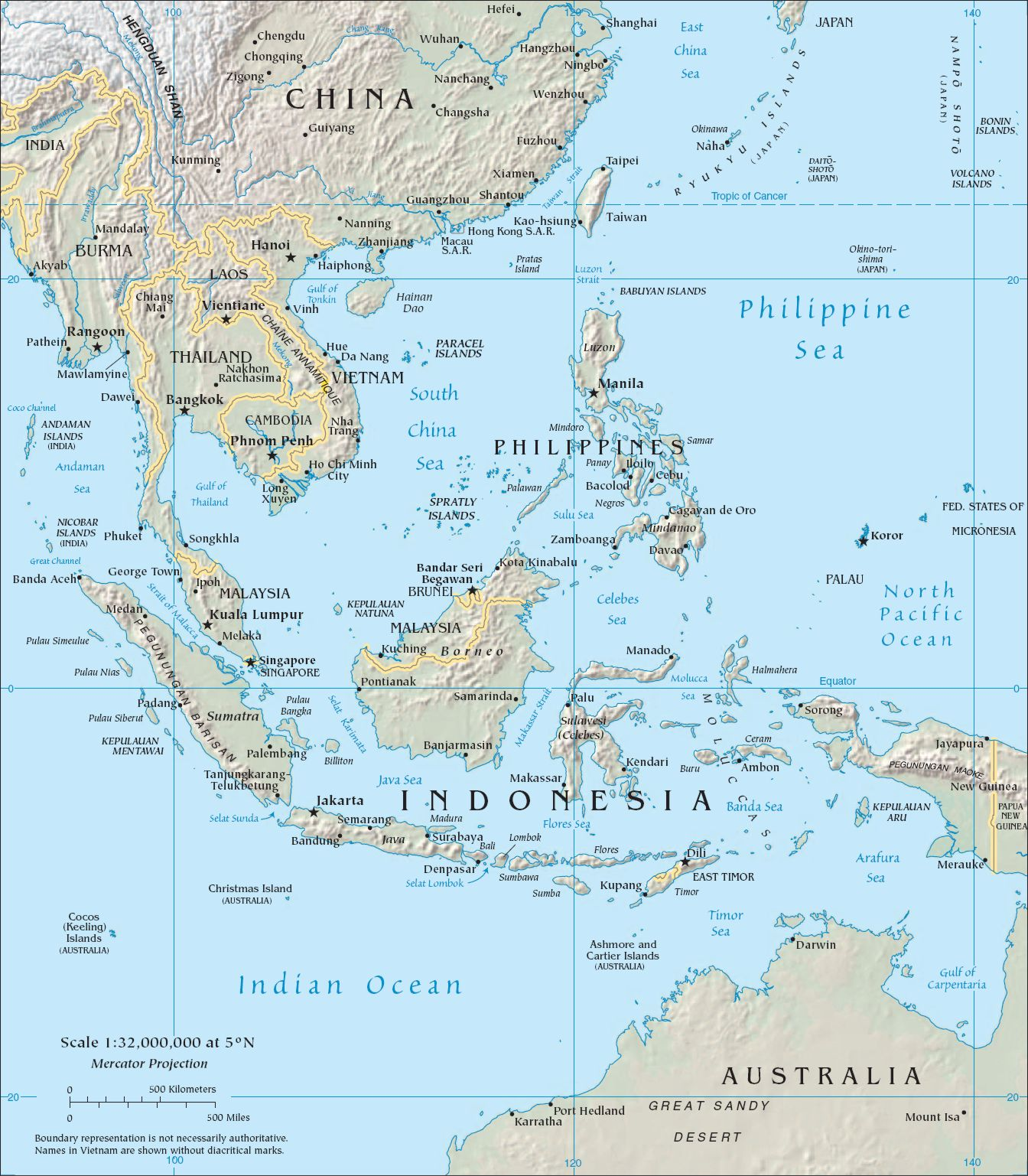

- Location within Indian Ocean
- Type: Sea
- Basin countries: List: Australia Brunei Cambodia China Indonesia Malaysia Papua New Guinea Philippines Singapore Taiwan Thailand Timor-Leste Vietnam
- Surface area: 9,080,000 km^{2} (3,510,000 sq mi)
- Max. depth: 7,440 m (24,410 ft)

The Australasian Mediterranean Sea is a mediterranean sea located in the area between Australasia and Southeast Asia. It connects the Indian Ocean and the Pacific Ocean. It has a maximum depth of 7,440 metres and a surface area of 9,080,000 km^{2}.

== Geography ==
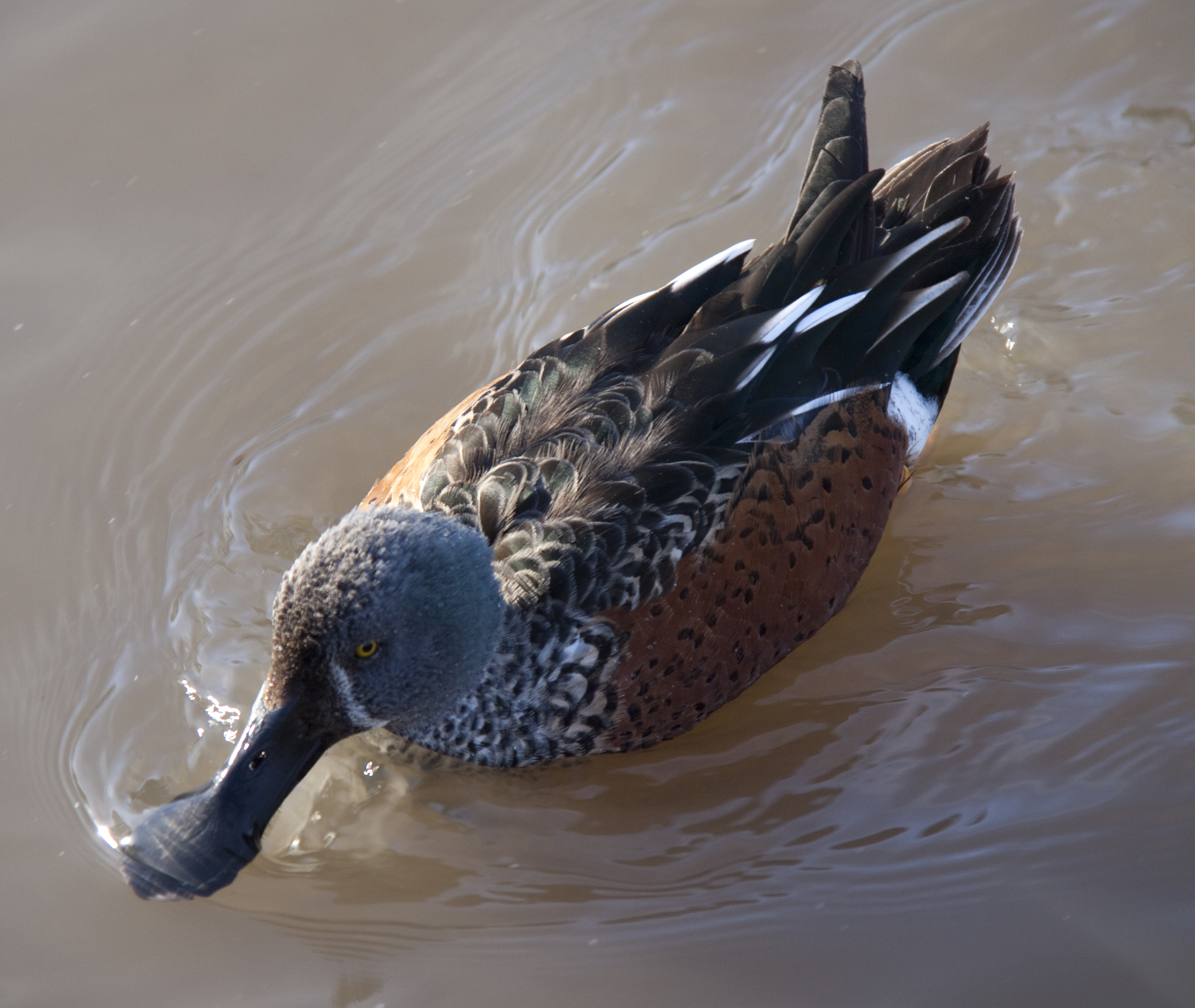
Australasian shoveler swimming

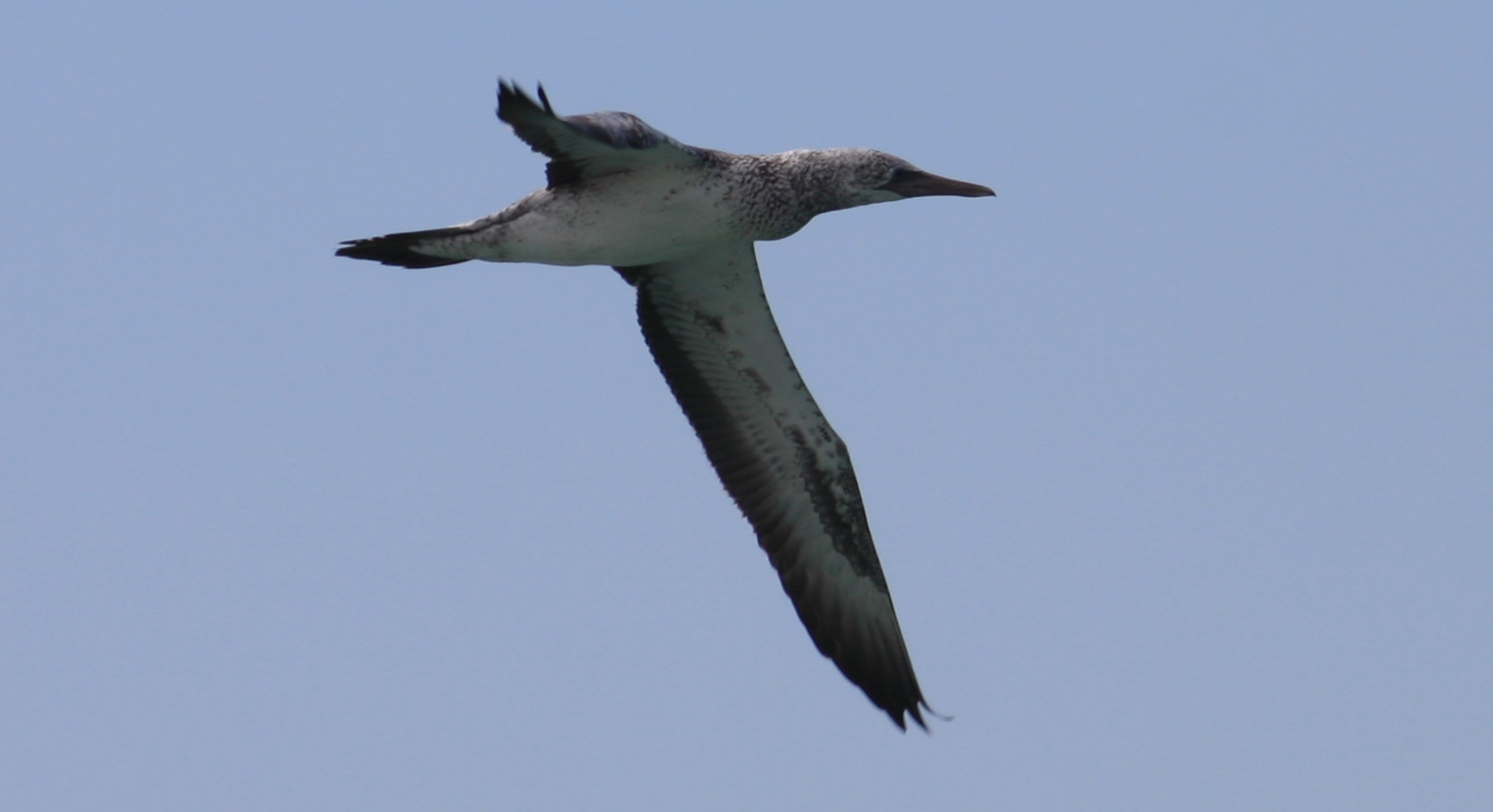
Australasian Gannet flying over sea

In contrast to the American Mediterranean Sea and the Eurafrican Mediterranean Sea, it is not surrounded by continents, only by islands and peninsulas. It includes the following seas:

1. South China Sea - 3,500,000 km^{2}
2. Banda Sea - 695,000 km^{2}
3. Arafura Sea - 650,000 km^{2}
4. Timor Sea - 610,000 km^{2}
5. Celebes Sea - 472,000 km^{2}
6. Java Sea - 320,000 km^{2}
7. Gulf of Thailand - 320,000 km^{2}
8. Gulf of Carpentaria - 300,000 km^{2}
9. Sulu Sea - 260,000 km^{2}
10. Molucca Sea - 200,000 km^{2}
11. Natuna Sea
12. Gulf of Tonkin - 126,250 km^{2}
13. Flores Sea - 121,000 km^{2}
14. Savu Sea - 105,000 km^{2}
15. Halmahera Sea - 95,000 km^{2}
16. Bali Sea - 45,000 km^{2}
17. Joseph Bonaparte Gulf - 26,780 km^{2}
18. Van Diemen Gulf - 12,035 km^{2}
19. Seram Sea - 12,000 km^{2}
20. Sibuyan Sea
21. Clarence Strait
22. Straits of Johor
23. Karimata Strait
24. Lombok Strait
25. Luzon Strait
26. Makassar Strait
27. Strait of Malacca
28. Ombai Strait
29. Qiongzhou Strait
30. Riau Strait
31. Singapore Strait
32. Sunda Strait
33. Taiwan Strait
34. Torres Strait
35. Gaspar Strait
36. Wetar Strait

Countries and territories with a coast on the Australasian Mediterranean Sea are: Australia, Brunei, Cambodia, China, Hong Kong, Indonesia, Macao, Malaysia, Papua New Guinea, the Philippines, Singapore, Taiwan, Thailand, Timor-Leste, and Vietnam. It includes the straits of Luzon, Malacca, and Singapore, and adjoins the peninsulas of Indochina and Malay.

The following islands are located within it:

- Bathurst Island, Groote Eylandt, Hainan Dao, Phú Quốc, Ko Chang, Samui archipelago, Nang Yuan, Ko Phangan, Ko Samui, Ko Tao, Tioman, Melville Island, Maluku Islands, New Guinea, Paracel Islands, Pratas Island, Philippines, Riau Islands, Sangir Archipelago, Spratly Islands, Greater Sunda Islands (Borneo, Sumatra, Java, Sulawesi), Lesser Sunda Islands (Bali, Flores, Komodo Islands, Lombok, Sumba, Sumbawa, Timor), Taiwan, and Talaud Islands.

== See also ==
- East Indian Archipelago
- Maritime Southeast Asia
