= List of drainage basins by area =

Major continental divides, showing drainage into the major oceans and seas of the world--Drainage basins of the principal oceans and seas of the world. Grey areas are endorheic basins that do not drain to the ocean.

The list of drainage basins by area identifies basins (also known as "catchments" or, in North American usage, "watersheds"), sorted by area, which drain to oceans, mediterranean seas, rivers, lakes and other water bodies. All basins larger than 400,000 km^{2} (150,000 sq mi) are included as well as selected smaller basins. It includes drainage basins which do not flow to the ocean (endorheic basins). It includes oceanic sea drainage basins which have hydrologically coherent areas (oceanic seas are set by IHO convention).

The oceans drain approximately 83% of the land in the world. The other 17% – an area larger than the basin of the Arctic Ocean – drains to internal endorheic basins. There are also substantial areas of the world that do not "drain" in the commonly understood sense. In polar deserts, much of the snowfall sublimates directly into the air and does not melt into flowing water, while in tropical deserts precipitation may evaporate before joining any substantial water course. These areas can still be included in topographically defined basins if the hypothetical flow of water (or ice) over the surface of the ground (or ice sheet) is considered. For example, the Antarctic ice sheet can be divided into basins, and most of Libya is included in the Mediterranean Sea basin even though almost no water from the interior actually reaches the sea.

== Basins ==
Continent color key
Africa	Asia	Asia/Europe	Europe	North America	Australia	South America	Antarctica

Basin	Type	Continent	Drains to	Basin area		Notes
Basin	Type	Continent	Drains to	km^{2}	mi^{2}	Notes
Atlantic Ocean	Ocean	Multiple	n/a	69,800,000	26,900,000	(Note: This is an approximate value based on geospatial data from the USGS. Approximate values for the area of Greenland and Antarctica were added to this data.)
Arctic Ocean	Ocean	Multiple	n/a	23,100,000	8,900,000	
Pacific Ocean	Ocean	Multiple	n/a	20,300,000	7,800,000	
Indian Ocean	Ocean	Multiple	n/a	19,400,000	7,500,000	
Southern Ocean	Ocean	Antarctica	n/a	14,000,000	5,400,000	(Note: The value listed here assumes that the entire continent drains to the ocean, such as through the many ice streams, outlet glaciers, and seasonal glacial streams along the coast. However, there are many small endorheic lakes, for example in the McMurdo Dry Valleys.)
Mediterranean-Black Sea system	Mediterranean sea	Multiple	Atlantic Ocean (Note: Note that the connection between a mediterranean sea (or a large estuary) and its parent ocean usually involves simultaneous inflow and outflow in the lower and upper water layers of the connecting channel. Depending on the salinity of the sea, the upper layer may either flow into or out from the ocean; the bottom layer will flow the opposite direction.)	7,770,000	3,000,000	
Amazon River	Primary river	South America	Atlantic Ocean	6,200,000	2,400,000	
Gulf of Mexico and Caribbean Sea	Mediterranean sea	Multiple	Atlantic Ocean	6,200,000	2,400,000	
Mediterranean Sea	Mediterranean sea	Multiple	Atlantic Ocean	5,880,000	2,270,000	2,060,000
Hudson Bay drainage basin	Mediterranean sea	North America	Arctic Ocean	3,861,400	1,490,900	
Congo River	Primary river	Africa	Atlantic Ocean	3,730,881	1,440,501	
Caspian Sea	Lake	Asia/Europe	n/a (endorheic basin)	3,626,000	1,400,000	
Nile River	Primary river	Africa	Mediterranean Sea	3,254,853	1,256,706	
Mississippi-Missouri River	Primary river	North America	Gulf of Mexico	3,202,185	1,236,371	
Bay of Bengal	Bay	Asia	Indian Ocean	3,200,000	1,200,000	
Río de la Plata	Estuary	South America	Atlantic Ocean	3,170,000	1,220,000	
Ob River	Primary river	Asia	Arctic Ocean	2,982,493	1,151,547	
Paraná River	Tributary river	South America	Río de la Plata	2,582,704	997,188	
Yenisei River	Primary river	Asia	Arctic Ocean	2,554,388	986,255	
Chad Basin	Endorheic basin	Africa	n/a (endorheic basin)	2,497,738	964,382	
Lena River	Primary river	Asia	Arctic Ocean	2,306,743	890,638	
Black Sea	Mediterranean sea	Asia/Europe	Mediterranean Sea	2,430,000	940,000	
Niger River	Primary river	Africa	Atlantic Ocean	2,261,741	873,263	
Ganges–Brahmaputra	Primary river	Asia	Bay of Bengal	1,999,000	772,000	
Amur River	Primary river	Asia	Pacific Ocean	1,929,955	745,160	
Mackenzie River	Primary river	North America	Beaufort Sea	1,805,200	697,000	
Yangtze River (Chang Jiang)	Primary river	Asia	Pacific Ocean	1,722,193	664,942	
Baltic Sea	Mediterranean sea	Europe	Atlantic Ocean	1,700,000	660,000	
Irtysh River	Tributary river	Asia	Ob River	1,673,470	646,130	
Aral Sea	Lake	Asia	n/a (endorheic basin)	1,618,750	625,000	
Madeira River	Tributary river	South America	Amazon River	1,485,218	573,446	
Volga River	Primary river	Europe	Caspian Sea	1,410,951	544,771	
Persian Gulf	Mediterranean sea	Asia	Indian Ocean	1,400,000	540,000	
St. Lawrence Estuary	Estuary	North America	Gulf of Saint Lawrence	1,344,200	519,000	
Zambezi River	Primary river	Africa	Indian Ocean	1,332,574	514,510	
Missouri River	Tributary river	North America	Mississippi River	1,331,810	514,210	
Lake Eyre Basin	Lake	Australia	n/a (endorheic basin)	1,210,000	470,000	
Ganges River	Primary river	Asia	Bay of Bengal	1,200,000	463,322	
Paraguay River	Tributary river	South America	Paraná River	1,095,000	423,000	
Indus River	Primary river	Asia	Arabian Sea	1,081,718	417,654	
Nelson River	Primary river	North America	Hudson Bay	1,072,300	414,000	
Murray-Darling basin	Primary river	Australia	Southern Ocean	1,050,116	405,452	
St. Lawrence River	Primary river	North America	Atlantic Ocean	1,049,636	405,267	
Angara River	Tributary river	Asia	Yenisei River	1,039,000	401,000	
Lake Chad (New Conventional Basin)	Lake	Africa	n/a (endorheic basin)	1,035,000	400,000	
Lake Winnipeg	Lake	North America	Nelson River	982,900	379,500	
Great Slave Lake	Lake	North America	Mackenzie River	976,200	376,900	
Orinoco River	Primary river	South America	Atlantic Ocean	953,675	368,216	
Orange River	Primary river	Africa	Atlantic Ocean	941,351	363,458	
Kasai River	Tributary river	Africa	Congo River	925,172	357,211	
Shatt al-Arab (Tigris, Euphrates & Karun)	Primary river	Asia	Persian Gulf	916,200	353,700	
Tarim Basin	Endorheic basin	Asia	n/a (endorheic basin)	906,500	350,000	
North Sea	Mediterranean sea	Europe	Atlantic Ocean	850,000	330,000	
Yukon River	Primary river	North America	Bering Sea	839,200	324,000	
Yellow River	Primary river	Asia	Pacific Ocean	832,238	321,329	(Note: Estimates for the Yellow River basin range from ca. 752,000 km2 (Chinese, English, French, German etc. wikipedia articles, none sourced) to 944,970 km2.)
Mekong River	Primary river	Asia	Pacific Ocean	805,604	311,045	
Jubba-Shebelle basin	Primary river	Africa	Indian Ocean	805,100	310,900	
Great Lakes	Lake	North America	St. Lawrence River	800,114	308,926	
Danube River	Primary river	Europe	Black Sea	795,656	307,204	
Syr Darya	Primary river	Asia	Aral Sea	782,617	302,170	
Tocantins River	Primary river	South America	Atlantic Ocean	764,213	295,064	
Ubangi River	Tributary river	Africa	Congo River	754,830	291,440	
Aldan River	Tributary river	Asia	Lena River	729,000	281,000	
Kalahari Basin/Okavango Basin	Endorheic basin	Africa	n/a (endorheic basin)	721,258	278,479	
Rio Negro	Tributary river	South America	Amazon River	720,114	278,038	
Kolyma River	Primary river	Asia	Arctic Ocean	679,934	262,524	
Columbia River	Primary river	North America	Pacific Ocean	671,300	259,200	
Brahmaputra River	Tributary river	Asia	Ganges River	651,335	251,482	
Colorado River	Primary river	North America	Gulf of California	637,137	246,000	
Mamoré River	Tributary river	South America	Madeira River	630,835	243,567	
Red Sea	Mediterranean sea	Africa/Asia	Indian Ocean	620,000	240,000	
São Francisco River	Primary river	South America	Atlantic Ocean	617,812	238,539	
Slave River	Tributary river	North America	Great Slave Lake	616,400	238,000	
Rio Grande	Primary river	North America	Gulf of Mexico	607,934	234,725	
Lake Baikal	Lake	Asia	Angara River	571,000	220,000	
Songhua River	Tributary river	Asia	Amur River	554,575	214,123	
Chari River	Primary river	Africa	Lake Chad	548,747	211,872	
Amu Darya	Primary river	Asia	Aral Sea	534,739	206,464	
Euphrates	Tributary river	Asia	Shatt al-Arab	532,300	205,500	
Xingu River	Tributary river	South America	Amazon River	520,292	200,886	
Bahr el Ghazal River	Tributary river	Africa	Nile	520,000	200,000	
Lake Balkhash	Lake	Asia	n/a (endorheic basin)	512,015	197,690	
Dnieper River	Primary river	Europe	Black Sea	511,650	197,550	(Note: Estimates for the Dnieper basin range from 504,000 km2 (most wikipedia pages) to 533,966 km2)
Kama River	Tributary river	Europe	Volga River	507,000	196,000	
Jubba River	Primary river	Africa	Indian Ocean	497,626	192,134	(Note: Excluding the Shebelle tributary river basin.)
Great Basin	Endorheic basin	North America	n/a (endorheic basin)	492,000	190,000	(Note: The Great Basin is a set of endorheic drainage basins, the largest being the 35,910 km^{2} (13,860 sq mi) basin that drains into the Great Salt Lake.)
Ohio River	Tributary river	North America	Mississippi River	490,603	189,423	
Lower Tunguska River	Tributary river	Asia	Yenisei river	473,000	183,000	
Vilyuy River	Tributary river	Asia	Lena River	454,000	175,000	
Pearl River	Primary river	Asia	Pacific Ocean	453,700	175,200	
Tapajós River	Tributary river	South America	Amazon River	453,510	175,100	
Selenga River	Tributary river	Asia	Lake Baikal	445,245	171,910	
Don River	Primary river	Europe	Black Sea	443,729	171,325	(Note: Official estimates for the Don basin range from 422,000 km2 to 458,694 km2.)
Arkansas River	Tributary river	North America	Mississippi River	435,122	168,002	
Tobol River	Tributary river	Asia	Irtysh River	426,000	164,000	
Limpopo River	Primary river	Africa	Indian Ocean	421,123	162,596	
Senegal River	Primary river	Africa	Atlantic Ocean	419,575	161,999	
Irrawaddy River	Primary river	Asia	Indian Ocean	413,710	159,730	
Volta River	Primary river	Africa	Atlantic Ocean	407,093	157,179	
Colorado River (Argentina)	Primary river	South America	Atlantic Ocean	373,863	144,349	(Note: Estimates for the Colorado basin range from 294,076 km2 to 403,005 km2.)
Sistan Basin	Endorheic basin	Asia	n/a (endorheic basin)	370,000	140,000	
Molopo River	Tributary river	Africa	Orange River	367,201	141,777	
Yamuna	Tributary river	Asia	Ganges	366,223	141,399	
Uruguay River	Primary river	South America	Río de la Plata	365,000	141,000	(Note: 365,000 km2 is almost always quoted, though the area is only ca 351,000 km2 according to River Networks. Estimates as low as 297,211 km2 may perhaps exclude the Rio Negro tributary basin.)
Khatanga River	Primary river	Asia	Arctic Ocean	364,000	141,000	
Marañón River	Tributary river	South America	Amazon River	363,286	140,266	
Guaporé River	Tributary river	South America	Mamoré River	360,534	139,203	
Indigirka River	Primary river	Asia	Arctic Ocean	360,400	139,200	
Araguaia River	Tributary river	South America	Tocantins River	358,125	138,273	
Northern Dvina	Primary river	Europe	White Sea	357,075	137,867	
Xi River	Tributary river	Asia	Pearl River	353,100	136,300	
Purus River	Tributary river	South America	Amazon River	352,085	135,941	
Ucayali River	Tributary river	South America	Amazon River	337,519	130,317	
Shebelle River	Tributary river	Africa	Jubba River	336,627	129,972	
Saskatchewan River	Tributary river	North America	Lake Winnipeg	335,900	129,700	
Benue River	Tributary river	Africa	Niger River	335,035	129,358	
Parnaíba River	Primary river	South America	Atlantic Ocean	331,643	128,048	(Note: Estimates range from 322,887 km2, and 331,565 km2 to 344,112 km2)
Blue Nile	Tributary river	Africa	Nile	325,000	125,000	
Pechora River	Primary river	Europe	Arctic Ocean	322,000	124,000	
Hai River	Primary river	Asia	Pacific Ocean	318,200	122,900	
Godavari River	Primary river	Asia	Indian Ocean	314,829	121,556	
Peace River	Tributary river	North America	Slave River	306,000	118,000	
Panjnad River (Chenab & Sutlej)	Tributary river	Asia	Indus River	300,000	120,000	
Baker Lake/Chesterfield Inlet	Lake / estuary	North America	Hudson Bay	299,000	115,000	
Red River of the North	Tributary river	North America	Lake Winnipeg	287,500	111,000	
Churchill River (Hudson Bay)	Primary river	North America	Hudson Bay	281,300	108,600	
Neva River	Primary river	Europe	Baltic Sea	281,000	108,000	
Taz Estuary	Estuary	Asia	Arctic Ocean	262,000	101,000	
Snake River	Tributary river	North America	Columbia River	278,450	107,510	
Liard River	Tributary river	North America	Mackenzie River	277,100	107,000	
Lake Athabasca-Rivière des Rochers	Lake	North America	Slave River	274,540	106,000	
Salween River	Primary river	Asia	Indian Ocean	271,888	104,977	(Note: Rivers Network calculated an area of 266,354 km2. Often-mentioned areas of ca 324,000 km2 are clearly too high.)
Lukuga River	Tributary river	Africa	Congo River	270,900	104,600	
Luvua River	Tributary river	Africa	Congo River	265,300	102,400	
Kwango River	Tributary river	Africa	Kasai River	263,400	101,700	
Desaguadero River	Tributary river	South America	Colorado River	260,000	100,000	
Mapimí-Salado basin	Endorheic basin	North America	n/a (endorheic basin)	260,000	100,000	
Krishna River	Primary river	Asia	Indian Ocean	258,948	99,980	
Magdalena River	Primary river	South America	Atlantic Ocean	257,438	99,397	
Dongting Lake	Lake	Asia	Yangtze River	257,000	99,000	
Japurá/Caquetá River	Tributary river	South America	Amazon River	255,700	98,700	
Nen River	Tributary river	Asia	Songhua River	252,100	97,300	
Oka River	Tributary river	Europe	Volga	245,000	95,000	
Rhine–Meuse–Scheldt delta	Primary river	Europe	North Sea	240,000	93,000	
Stony Tunguska River	Tributary river	Asia	Yenisei river	240,000	93,000	
Beni River	Tributary river	South America	Madeira River	239,825	92,597	
Lake Victoria	Lake	Africa	Nile River	238,900	92,200	
Yana River	Primary river	Asia	Arctic Ocean	238,000	92,000	
Lake Tanganyika	Lake	Africa	Lukuga River	236,300	91,200	
Sangha River	Tributary river	Africa	Congo River	233,740	90,250	
Fraser River	Primary river	North America	Pacific Ocean	233,100	90,000	
Zeya River	Tributary river	Asia	Amur River	233,000	90,000	
Liao River	Primary river	Asia	Pacific Ocean	232,200	89,700	
Ural River	Primary river	Asia/Europe	Caspian Sea	231,000	89,000	
Juruá River	Tributary river	South America	Amazon River	225,828	87,193	
Sobat River	Tributary river	Africa	Nile River	225,000	87,000	
Vitim River	Tributary river	Asia	Lena River	225,000	87,000	
Ogooué River	Primary river	Africa	Atlantic Ocean	223,856	86,431	
Tigris River	Tributary river	Asia	Shatt al-Arab	221,400	85,500	
Platte River	Tributary river	North America	Missouri River	219,916	84,910	
Olenyok River	Primary river	Asia	Arctic Ocean	219,000	85,000	
Olyokma River	Tributary river	Asia	Lena River	210,000	81,000	
Shilka River	Tributary river	Asia	Amur River	206,000	80,000	
Rufiji River	Primary river	Africa	Indian Ocean	204,450	78,940	
Kura River	Primary river	Asia	Caspian Sea	198,300	76,600	
Vaal River	Tributary river	Africa	Orange River	196,438	75,845	
Vistula	Primary river	Europe	Baltic Sea	194,424	75,068	
Ussuri River	Tributary river	Asia	Amur River	193,000	75,000	
Juruena River	Tributary river	South America	Tapajos River	191,030	73,760	
Anadyr River	Primary river	Asia	Bering Sea	191,000	74,000	
Branco River	Tributary river	South America	Rio Negro	189,925	73,330	
Ishim River	Tributary river	Asia	Irtysh River	189,000	73,000	
Rhine	Primary river	Europe	North Sea	185,300	71,500	
Komadugu-Yobe River	Primary river	Africa	Lake Chad	183,009	70,660	
Assiniboine River	Tributary river	North America	Red River	182,000	70,000	
Pyasina River	Primary river	Asia	Pyasina Gulf	182,000	70,000	
Yellowstone River	Tributary river	North America	Missouri River	181,000	70,000	
Uyandina River	Tributary river	Asia	Indigirka River	176,000	68,000	
Kotuy River	Tributary river	Asia	Khatanga River	176,000	68,000	
Chenab River	Tributary river	Asia	Panjnad River	176,000	68,000	
Han River	Tributary river	Asia	Yangtze River	174,300	67,300	
Huai River	Tributary river	Asia	Yangtze River	174,000	67,000	
Tshuapa/Ruki River	Tributary river	Africa	Congo River	173,800	67,100	
Maya River	Tributary river	Asia	Aldan River	171,000	66,000	
Salado River (Buenos Aires)	Primary river	South America	Atlantic Ocean	170,000	66,000	
Red River of the South	Tributary river	North America	Mississippi River	169,890	65,590	
Red River	Primary river	Asia	Gulf of Tonkin	169,000	65,000	
Cuvelai River-Etosha Basin	Endorheic basin	Africa	n/a (endorheic basin)	166,649	64,344	
Chesapeake Bay	Estuary	North America	Atlantic Ocean	166,534	64,299	
Helmand River	Primary river	Asia	Sistan Basin	166,000	64,000	
Argun / Hailar River	Tributary river	Asia	Amur River	164,000	63,000	
Chao Phraya River	Primary river	Asia	Gulf of Thailand	160,400	61,900	
Hulun Lake	Lake	Asia	Amur River / endorheic	160,335	61,906	(Note: Combined drainage area of Kherlen River (103709 km2) & Orxon Rivers (56626 km2) . "In years with high precipitation, the normally exit−less endorheic lake may overflow at its northern shore.")
Jialing River	Tributary river	Asia	Yangtze River	160,000	62,000	
Luangwa River	Tributary river	Africa	Zambezi River	159,615	61,628	
Tisza River	Tributary river	Europe	Danube	157,186	60,690	
Torgay/Turgai River	Primary river	Asia	n/a (endorheic basin)	157,000	61,000	
Mbomou River	Tributary river	Africa	Ubangi River	156,950	60,600	
Great Bear River	Tributary river	North America	Mackenzie River	156,500	60,400	
Kafue River	Tributary river	Africa	Zambezi River	155,805	60,157	
Kansas River	Tributary river	North America	Missouri River	155,695	60,114	
Ruvuma River	Primary river	Africa	Indian Ocean	155,500	60,000	
Essequibo River	Primary river	South America	Atlantic Ocean	154,186	59,532	
Sacramento–San Joaquin River Delta	Primary river	North America	San Francisco Bay	153,000	59,000	
Ruo Shui	Primary river	Asia	Endorheic basin	152,606	58,922	
Sankuru River	Tributary river	Africa	Kasai River	151,112	58,345	
Atbarah River	Tributary river	Africa	Nile	150,000	58,000	(Note: Very rough estimate. Upper river's drainage area, including the Tekezé river is 120,430 km2 , lower drainage area is probably not as much as 69,572 km2 , as that includes much surrounding dessert.)
Taz River	Primary river	Asia	Taz Estuary	150,000	58,000	
Tietê River	Tributary river	South America	Paraná River	150,000	58,000	
Cuanza River	Primary river	Africa	Atlantic Ocean	149,688	57,795	
Shire River (Lake Malawi)	Tributary river	Africa	Zambezi River	149,159	57,591	
Elbe	Primary river	Europe	North Sea	148,268	57,247	
Putumayo River	Tributary river	South America	Amazon River	148,000	57,000	
Bani River	Tributary river	Africa	Niger River	146,570	56,590	
Ottawa River	Tributary river	North America	St. Lawrence River	146,300	56,500	
South Saskatchewan River	Tributary river	North America	Saskatchewan River	146,100	56,400	
Lake Titicaca-Desaguadero River-Lake Poopó System	Endorheic basin	South America	n/a (endorheic basin)	144,590	55,830	
Chambal River	Tributary river	Asia	Yamuna River	143,219	55,297	
Rio Grande (Paraná River)	Tributary river	South America	Paraná River	143,000	55,000	
Fitzroy River (Queensland)	Primary river	Australia	Pacific Ocean	142,665	55,083	
Thelon River	Primary river	North America	Baker Lake	142,400	55,000	
Belaya River	Tributary river	Europe	Kama River	142,000	55,000	
Iriri River	Tributary river	South America	Xingu River	141,745	54,728	
Teles Pires River	Tributary river	South America	Tapajos River	141,620	54,680	
Mahanadi River	Primary river	Asia	Indian Ocean	141,600	54,700	
Ili River	Primary river	Asia	Lake Balkhash	140,000	54,000	
Sanaga River	Primary river	Africa	Atlantic Ocean	140,000	54,000	
Min River (Sichuan)	Tributary river	Asia	Yangtze River	140,000	54,000	
Guaviare River	Tributary river	South America	Orinoco River	138,447	53,455	
Pibor River	Tributary river	Africa	Sobat River	137,130	52,950	
Santiago-Lerma basin	Primary river	North America	Pacific Ocean	136,628	52,752	
Apure River	Tributary river	South America	Orinoco River	136,152	52,569	
Winnipeg River	Tributary river	North America	Lake Winnipeg	135,800	52,400	
Albany River	Primary river	North America	Hudson Bay	135,200	52,200	
Wei River	Tributary river	Asia	Yellow River	135,000	52,000	
Grijalva-Usumacinta basin	Primary river	North America	Gulf of Mexico	134,400	51,900	
Chulym River	Tributary river	Asia	Ob River	134,000	52,000	
Lukenie River	Tributary river	Africa	Congo River	133,432	51,518	
Koksoak River	Primary river	North America	Ungava Bay	133,400	51,500	
Orkhon River	Tributary river	Asia	Selenga River	132,835	51,288	
Uele River	Tributary river	Africa	Ubangi River	131,856	50,910	
Tambo-Ene-Apurímac River	Tributary river	South America	Ucayali River	131,460	50,760	
Lake Turkana	Lake	Africa	n/a (endorheic basin)	130,860	50,530	
Aripuanã River	Tributary river	South America	Madeira River	130,340	50,320	
Malagarasi River	Tributary river	Africa	Lake Tanganyika	130,000	50,000	
Mar Chiquita	Endorheic basin	South America	n/a (endorheic basin)	129,715	50,083	
Burdekin River	Primary river	Australia	Pacific Ocean	129,700	50,100	
Vyatka River	Tributary river	Europe	Kama River	129,000	50,000	
Yalong River	Tributary river	Asia	Yangtze River	128,444	49,593	
Taseyeva River	Tributary river	Asia	Angara River	128,000	49,000	
Ghaghara / Karnali River	Tributary river	Asia	Ganges River	127,950	49,400	
Trombetas River	Tributary river	South America	Amazon River	127,643	49,283	
Tana River (Kenya)	Primary river	Africa	Indian Ocean	126,026	48,659	
Madre de Dios River	Tributary river	South America	Beni River	125,287	48,374	
Green River	Tributary river	North America	Colorado River	124,578	48,100	
Kuskokwim River	Primary river	North America	Bering Sea	124,319	48,000	
Salado River (Argentina)	Tributary river	South America	Paraná River	124,199	47,954	
Taymyr River	Primary river	Asia	Kara Sea	124,000	48,000	
Canadian River	Tributary river	North America	Arkansas River	123,221	47,576	
Aruwimi River	Tributary river	Africa	Congo River	122,853	47,434	
North Saskatchewan River	Tributary river	North America	Saskatchewan River	122,800	47,400	
Prypiat River	Tributary river	Europe	Dnieper	121,840	47,040	
Vychegda River	Tributary river	Europe	Northern Dvina	121,000	47,000	
Mun River	Tributary river	Asia	Mekong River	119,180	46,020	
Oder	Primary river	Europe	Baltic Sea	118,861	45,892	
Porcupine River	Tributary river	North America	Yukon River	117,900	45,500	
Loire	Primary river	Europe	Atlantic Ocean	117,000	45,000	
Lomami River	Tributary river	Africa	Congo River	116,209	44,869	
Brazos River	Primary river	North America	Gulf of Mexico	116,000	45,000	
Mobile River	Primary river	North America	Gulf of Mexico	115,000	44,000	
Pecos River	Tributary river	North America	Rio Grande	115,000	44,000	
Pilcomayo River	Tributary river	South America	Paraguay River	114,402	44,171	
Sutlej River	Tributary river	Asia	Indus River	114,343	44,148	
Panj River	Tributary river	Asia	Amu Darya River	114,000	44,000	
Tanana River	Tributary river	North America	Yukon River	114,000	44,000	
Kwando/Chobe River	Tributary river	Africa	Zambezi River	113,393	43,781	
Omolon River	Tributary river	Asia	Kolyma River	113,000	44,000	
Uchur River	Tributary river	Asia	Aldan River	113,000	44,000	
Balsas River	Primary river	North America	Pacific Ocean	112,320	43,370	
Pur River	Primary river	Asia	Taz Estuary	112,000	43,000	
Pranhita River	Tributary river	Asia	Godavari River	109,078	42,115	
Flinders River	Primary river	Australia	Gulf of Carpentaria	109,000	42,000	
Moose River (Ontario)	Primary river	North America	Hudson Bay	108,500	41,900	
Hayes River	Primary river	North America	Hudson Bay	108,000	42,000	
Anyuy River (Sakha)	Tributary river	Asia	Kolyma River	107,000	41,000	
Bermejo River	Tributary river	South America	Paraguay River	106,924	41,284	
Cunene River	Primary river	Africa	Atlantic Ocean	106,560	41,140	
Back River	Primary river	North America	Arctic Ocean	106,500	41,100	
Save River	Primary river	Africa	Indian Ocean	106,420	41,090	
Tennessee River	Tributary river	North America	Ohio River	105,868	40,876	
Aras River	Tributary river	Asia	Kura River	104,785	40,458	
Bahr Aouk River	Tributary river	Africa	Chari River	103,577	39,991	
Wabash River	Tributary river	North America	Ohio River	103,500	40,000	
Colorado River (Texas)	Primary river	North America	Gulf of Mexico	103,300	39,900	
Severn River (northern Ontario)	Primary river	North America	Hudson Bay	102,800	39,700	
Chindwin River	Tributary river	Asia	Irrawaddy River	102,783	39,685	
Napo River	Tributary river	South America	Amazon River	102,190	39,460	
Río Negro (Argentina)	Primary river	South America	Atlantic Ocean	102,000	39,000	
Logone River	Tributary river	Africa	Chari River	101,481	39,182	
Anabar River	Primary river	Asia	Arctic Ocean	100,000	39,000	
Barito River (Borneo)	Primary river	Asia	Java Sea	100,000	39,000	
Kheta River	Tributary river	Asia	Khatanga River	100,000	39,000	
Markha River	Tributary river	Asia	Vilyuy River	99,900	38,600	
Donets	Tributary river	Europe	Don River	98,900	38,200	
Narmada River	Primary river	Asia	Arabian Sea	98,800	38,100	
Kapuas River (Borneo)	Primary river	Asia	South China Sea	98,749	38,127	
Rhône	Primary river	Europe	Mediterranean Sea	98,556	38,053	
Bandama River	Primary river	Africa	Atlantic Ocean	98,500	38,000	
Northern Sosva River	Tributary river	Asia	Ob River	98,300	38,000	
Neman River	Primary river	Europe	Baltic Sea	97,864	37,786	
La Grande River	Primary river	North America	James Bay	97,600	37,700	
Douro / Duero	Primary river	Europe	Atlantic Ocean	97,502	37,646	
Xiang River	Tributary river	Asia	Lake Dongting	96,400	37,200	
Onon River	Tributary river	Asia	Shilka River	96,200	37,100	
Sava River	Tributary river	Europe	Danube	95,419	36,841	
Athabasca River	Tributary river	North America	Lake Athabasca	95,300	36,800	

== See also ==
- List of rivers by discharge
- List of rivers by dissolved load
- List of rivers by length
- Triple divide
