= Mediterranean seas =

Enclosed sea with limited water exchange

In oceanography, a mediterranean sea (/ˌmɛdɪtəˈreɪniən/ MED-ih-tə-RAY-nee-ən) is a mostly enclosed sea that has limited exchange of water with outer oceans and whose water circulation is dominated by salinity and temperature differences rather than by winds or tides. The eponymous Mediterranean Sea, for example, is almost completely enclosed by Africa, Asia, and Europe.

== List of mediterranean seas by ocean ==
=== Atlantic Ocean ===
- The Arctic Ocean (a.k.a. the Arctic Mediterranean Sea)
- The American Mediterranean Sea (the combination of the Caribbean Sea and the Gulf of Mexico)
- Baffin Bay
- The Baltic Sea
- The namesake Mediterranean Sea (including the Adriatic Sea, the Aegean Sea (including the Sea of Crete and the Thracian Sea), the Alboran Sea, the Balearic Sea, the Sardinian Sea, the Black Sea, the Ionian Sea, the Ligurian Sea, the Sea of Azov, the Sea of Marmara, and the Tyrrhenian Sea)

=== Indian Ocean ===
- The Persian Gulf
- The Red Sea

=== Pacific Ocean ===
- The Australasian Mediterranean Sea (including the Banda Sea, the Java Sea, the Sulawesi Sea, and the Sulu Sea)

== List of mediterranean seas by type ==
There are two types of mediterranean sea.

=== Concentration basin ===
A concentration basin has a higher salinity than the outer ocean due to evaporation, and its water exchange consists of inflow of the fresher oceanic water in the upper layer and outflow of the saltier mediterranean water in the lower layer of the connecting channel.

- The Eurafrican Mediterranean Sea (a concentration basin as a whole, but the Adriatic Sea and the Black Sea are dilution basins (see below) owing to the Po River, and the Danube, Dnieper, and Don rivers respectively)
- The Persian Gulf
- The Red Sea

=== Dilution basin ===
A dilution basin has a lower salinity due to freshwater gains such as rainfall and rivers, and its water exchange consists of outflow of the fresher mediterranean water in the upper layer and inflow of the saltier oceanic water in the lower layer of the channel. Renewal of deep water may not be sufficient to supply oxygen to the bottom.

- The Adriatic Sea
- The American Mediterranean Sea
- The Arctic Ocean (a.k.a. the Arctic Mediterranean Sea)
- The Australasian Mediterranean Sea
- Baffin Bay
- The Baltic Sea
- The Black Sea

== Exceptions ==
- Hudson Bay is so shallow it functions like a huge estuary.
- Having shallow channels and deep basins, the Sea of Japan could form a mediterranean sea, but the strong currents from the Pacific prevent it from having an independent water circulation.

== See also ==
- Inland sea
- Marginal sea
