= European contact =

European contact may refer to:

== Exploration ==
- European exploration of Australia, encompasses several waves of seafarers and land explorers
- European exploration of Africa, began with Ancient Greeks and Romans, who explored and established settlements in North Africa

== Colonization ==
- Colonialism, the establishment, exploitation, maintenance, acquisition and expansion of colonies in one territory by people from another territory
- Colonization of Africa
- European colonization of the Americas, typically dated to 1492, when a Spanish expedition headed by Christopher Columbus sailed for India to open trade but inadvertently landed in the Americas

== See also ==
- Population history of American indigenous peoples
- Columbian Exchange, a dramatically widespread exchange of animals, plants, culture, human populations (including slaves), communicable disease, and ideas between the American and Afro-Eurasian Hemispheres following the voyage to the Americas by Christopher Columbus in 1492.:163 The term was coined in 1972 by Alfred W
- Kirishitan, from Portuguese cristão, referred to Roman Catholic Christians in Japanese and is used in Japanese texts as a historiographic term for Roman Catholics in Japan in the 16th and 17th centuries
