= Caribbean Sea =

Sea of the Atlantic Ocean bounded by North, Central, and South America

- Satellite imagery of the Caribbean Sea
- Interactive map of Caribbean Sea
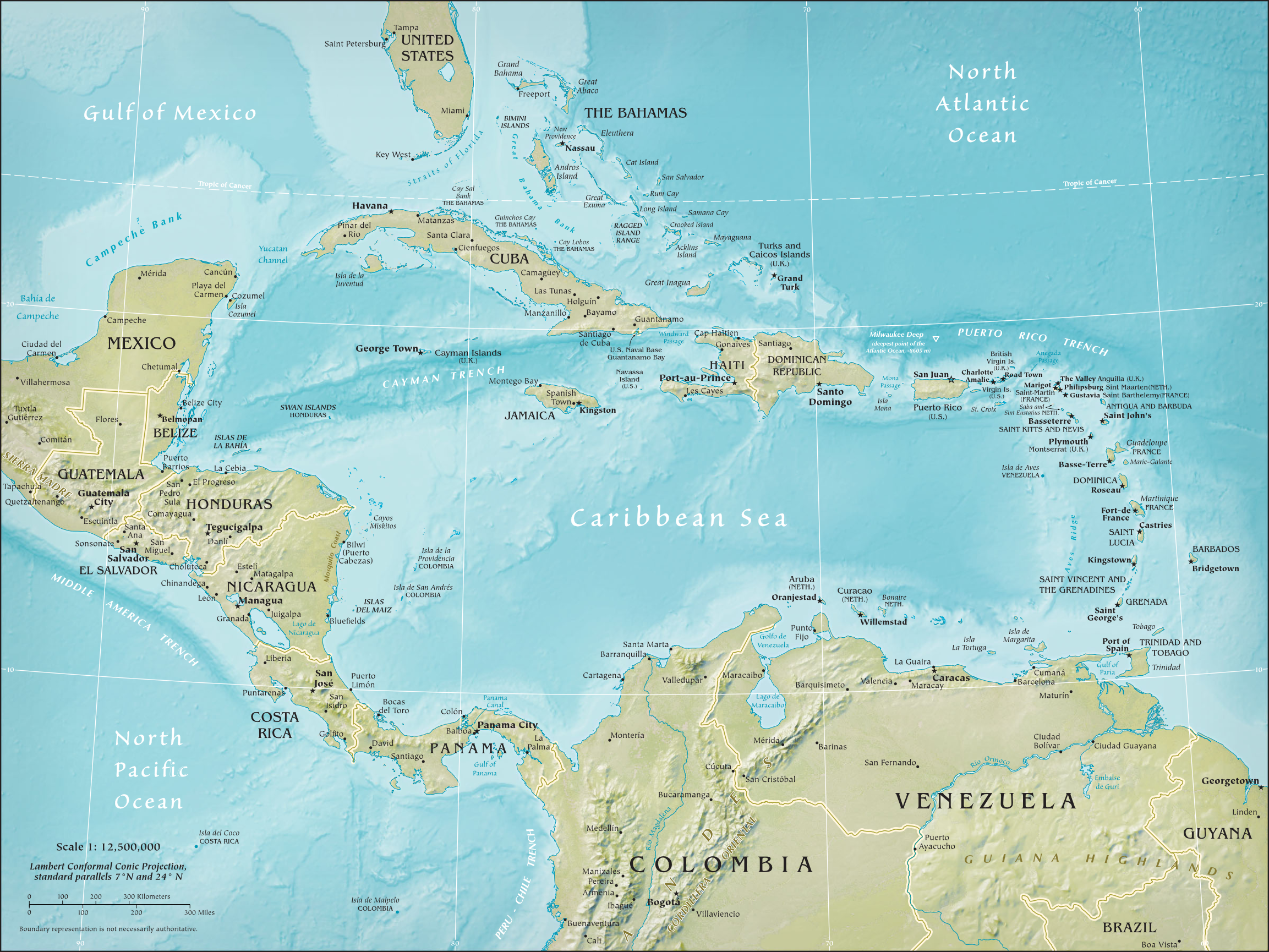
- Map of the Caribbean Sea
- Location: American Mediterranean Sea
- Coordinates: 15°N 75°W
- Type: Sea
- Part of: Atlantic Ocean
- River sources: Magdalena; Atrato; Chagres; San Juan; Coco; Motagua
- Basin countries: List: Anguilla Antigua and Barbuda Aruba Belize British Virgin Islands Caribbean Netherlands Cayman Islands Colombia Costa Rica Cuba Curaçao Dominica Dominican Republic Grenada Guadeloupe Guatemala Haiti Honduras Jamaica Mexico Montserrat Martinique Nicaragua Panama Puerto Rico Saint Kitts and Nevis Saint Martin Saint Vincent and the Grenadines Saint Lucia Trinidad and Tobago United States Virgin Islands Venezuela
- Surface area: 2,754,000 km^{2} (1,063,000 sq mi)
- Max. depth: 7,686 m (25,217 ft)
- Islands: West Indies (Greater Antilles and Lesser Antilles)
- Trenches: Cayman Trench and Puerto Rico Trench
- Settlements: Major cities: (Venezuela) Barcelona (Colombia) Barranquilla (Guadeloupe) Basse-Terre Belize City (Nicaragua) Bluefields (Montserrat) Brades Caimanera (Mexico) Cancún (Colombia) Cartagena (Saint Lucia) Castries (Venezuela) Catia La Mar (Trinidad and Tobago) Chaguanas (United States Virgin Islands) Charlotte Amalie (Mexico) Chetumal (Panama) Colón (Trinidad and Tobago) Couva (Venezuela) Cumaná Guantánamo Havana (Jamaica) Kingston (Saint Vincent and the Grenadines) Kingstown (Bonaire) Kralendijk (Honduras) La Ceiba (Venezuela) La Guaira (Costa Rica) Limón (Montserrat) Little Bay (Venezuela) Maiquetía (Venezuela) Maracaibo (Venezuela) Maracay (Puerto Rico) Mayagüez (Jamaica) Montego Bay (Aruba) Oranjestad (Puerto Rico) Ponce (Venezuela) Porlamar (Haiti) Port-au-Prince (Trinidad and Tobago) Port of Spain (Guatemala) Puerto Barrios (Venezuela) Puerto Cabello (Honduras) Puerto Cortes Puerto Padre (Venezuela) Puerto la Cruz (Venezuela) Punto Fijo (Colombia) Riohacha (Dominica) Roseau (Colombia) San Andrés (Puerto Rico) San Juan (Trinidad and Tobago) San Fernando (Colombia) Santa Marta Santiago de Cuba (Dominican Republic) Santiago de los Caballeros (Dominican Republic) Santo Domingo (Trinidad and Tobago) Scarborough (Grenada) St. George's (Antigua and Barbuda) St. John's (Colombia) Turbo (Curaçao) Willemstad

The Caribbean Sea is a sea of the North Atlantic Ocean in the tropics of the Western Hemisphere, located south of the Gulf of Mexico and southwest of the Sargasso Sea. It is bounded by the Greater Antilles to the north from Cuba to Puerto Rico, the Lesser Antilles to the east from the Virgin Islands to Trinidad and Tobago, South America to the south from the Venezuelan coastline to the Colombian coastline, and Central America and the Yucatán Peninsula to the west from Panama to Mexico. The geopolitical region around the Caribbean Sea, including the numerous islands of the West Indies and adjacent coastal areas in the mainland of the Americas, is known as the Caribbean.

The Caribbean Sea is one of the largest seas on Earth, with an area of about 2,754,000 km^{2} (1,063,000 sq mi). The sea's deepest point is the Cayman Trough, between the Cayman Islands and Jamaica, at 7,686 m (25,217 ft) below sea level. The Caribbean coastline has many gulfs and bays: the Gulf of Gonâve, the Gulf of Venezuela, the Gulf of Darién, Golfo de los Mosquitos, the Gulf of Paria and the Gulf of Honduras.

The Caribbean Sea has the world's second-largest barrier reef, the Mesoamerican Barrier Reef. It runs 1,000 km (620 mi) along the Mexico, Belize, Guatemala, and Honduras coasts.

== History ==
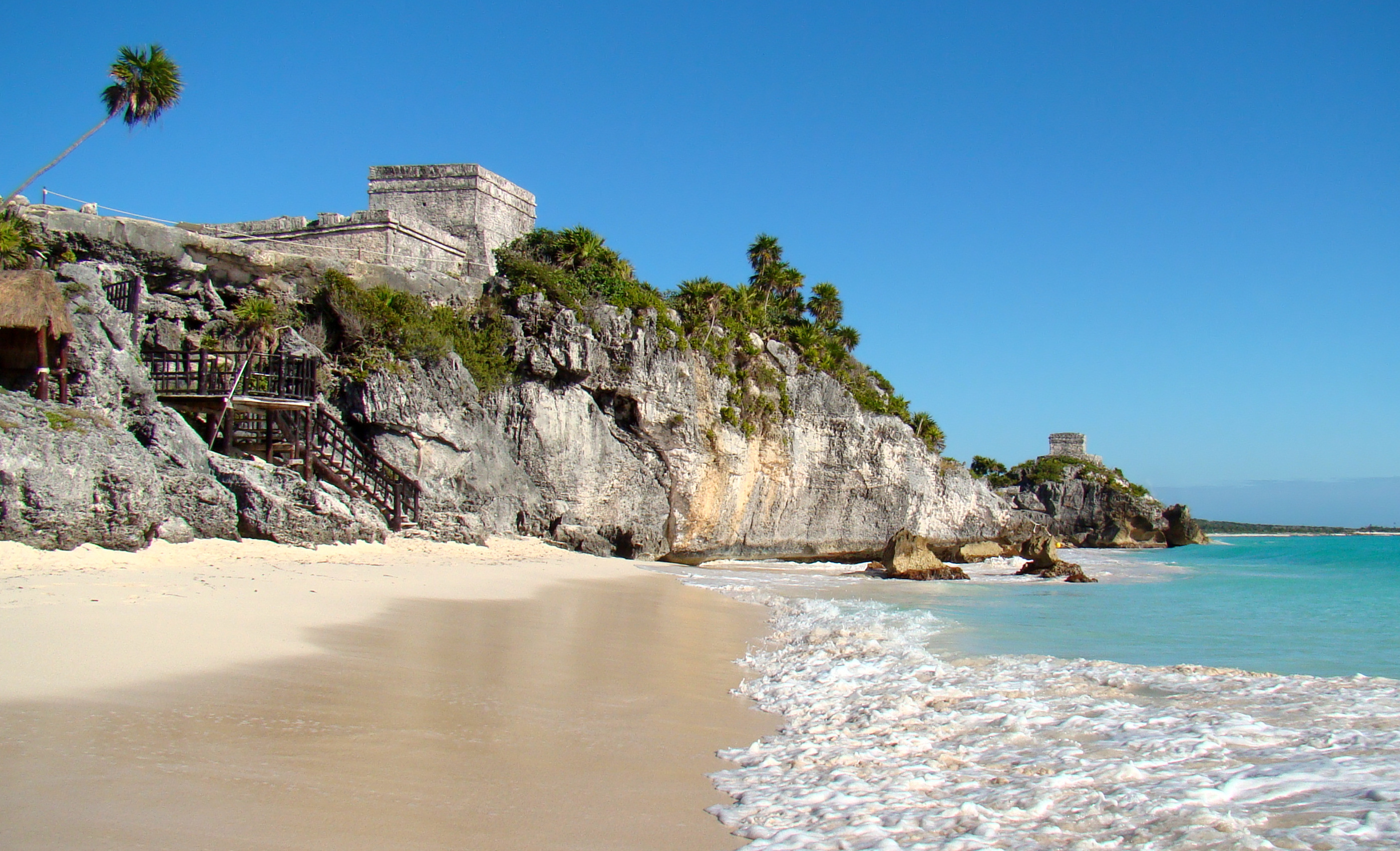
Tulum, a Mayan city on the coast of the Caribbean in the state of Quintana Roo, Mexico

The name Caribbean derives from the Caribs, one of the region's dominant native people at the time of European contact during the late 15th century. After Christopher Columbus landed in The Bahamas in 1492 and later discovered some of the islands in the Caribbean, the Spanish term Antillas applied to the lands; stemming from this, the Sea of the Antilles became a common alternative name for the "Caribbean Sea" in various European languages. Spanish dominance in the region remained undisputed during the first century of European colonization.

From the 16th century, Europeans visiting the Caribbean region distinguished the "South Sea" (the Pacific Ocean south of the isthmus of Panama) from the "North Sea" (the Caribbean Sea north of the same isthmus).

The Caribbean Sea was unknown to the populations of Eurasia until after 1492, when Christopher Columbus sailed into Caribbean waters in search of a sea route to Asia. At that time, the Americas were generally unknown to most Europeans, although they had been visited in the 10th century by the Vikings. After Columbus discovered the islands, the area was quickly colonized by several Western cultures (initially Spain, then later England, the Dutch Republic, France, Courland and Denmark). After the colonization of the Caribbean islands, the Caribbean Sea became a busy area for European-based maritime trade and transport. The commerce eventually attracted pirates such as Samuel Bellamy and Blackbeard. As of 2015, the area is home to 22 island territories and borders 12 continental countries.

== Extent ==
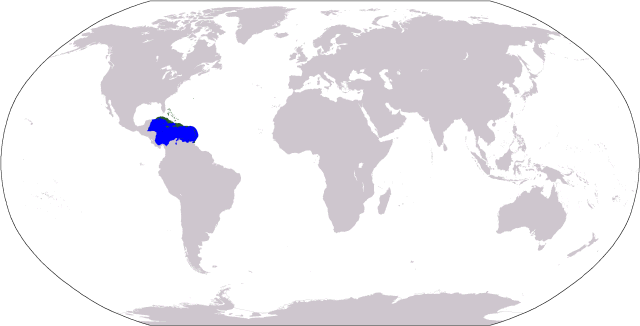
The Caribbean Sea, southeast of the Gulf of Mexico

The International Hydrographic Organization defines the limits of the Caribbean Sea as follows:

On the North: In the Windward Channel – a line joining Caleta Point (74°15′W) in Cuba and Pearl Point (19°40′N) in Haiti. In the Mona Passage – a line joining Cape Engaño and the extreme of Agujereada (18°31′N 67°08′W) in Puerto Rico.

Eastern limits: From Point San Diego (Puerto Rico) northward along the meridian thereof (65°39′W) to the 100-fathom line, thence eastward and southward, in such a manner that all islands, shoals, and narrow waters of the Lesser Antilles are included in the Caribbean Sea as far as Galera Point ((north)eastern tip of the island of Trinidad). From Galera Point through Trinidad to Galeota Point (southeastern tip) and from there to Baja Point (9°32′N 61°0′W) in Venezuela.

== Geology ==
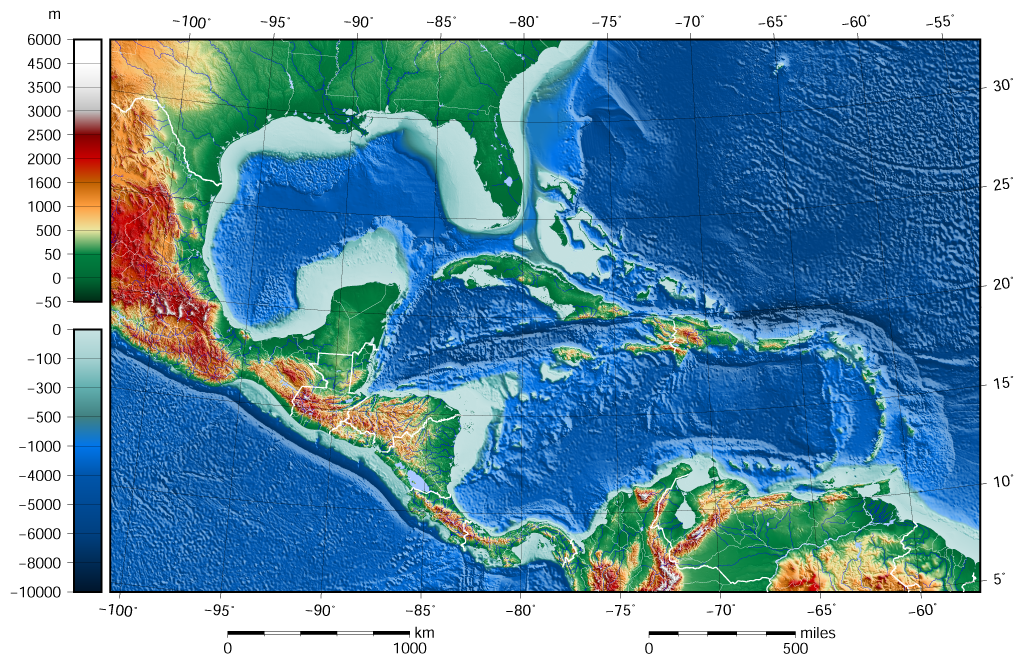
The shaded relief map of the Caribbean Sea and the Gulf of Mexico area

The Caribbean Sea is an oceanic sea on the Caribbean Plate. The Caribbean Sea is separated from the ocean by several island arcs of various ages. The youngest stretches from the Lesser Antilles to the Virgin Islands to north of Trinidad and Tobago, which is in the Atlantic. This arc was formed by a collision of the South American Plate with the Caribbean Plate. It included active and extinct volcanoes such as Mount Pelee, the Quill on Sint Eustatius in the Caribbean Netherlands, La Soufrière in Saint Vincent and the Grenadines and Morne Trois Pitons on Dominica. The larger islands in the northern part of the sea, Cuba, Hispaniola, Jamaica, and Puerto Rico lie on an older island arc.

The Caribbean Sea is estimated to be 160 million to 180 million years old and formed when a horizontal fracture in Pangaea split the supercontinent during the Mesozoic Era. It is assumed the proto-Caribbean basin existed in the Devonian period and, in the early Carboniferous movement of Gondwana to the north and its convergence with the Euramerica basin, decreased in size. The next stage in the formation of the Caribbean Sea began in the Triassic. Powerful rifting led to the formation of narrow troughs stretching from modern Newfoundland to the Gulf of Mexico's west coast, which deposited siliciclastic sedimentary rocks. In the early Jurassic, due to a powerful marine transgression, water broke into the current area of the Gulf of Mexico, creating a vast shallow pool. Deep basins emerged in the Caribbean during the Middle Jurassic rifting. The emergence of the basins marked the beginning of the Atlantic Ocean and contributed to the destruction of Pangaea at the end of the late Jurassic. During the Cretaceous, the Caribbean acquired a shape close to today's. In the early Paleogene, due to marine regression, the Caribbean became separated from the Gulf of Mexico and the Atlantic Ocean by the lands of Cuba and Haiti. The Caribbean remained like this for most of the Cenozoic until the Holocene, when rising ocean levels restored communication with the Atlantic Ocean. The Caribbean's floor is composed of suboceanic sediments of deep red clay in the deep basins and troughs. On continental slopes and ridges, calcareous silts are found. Clay minerals have likely been deposited by the mainland river Orinoco and the Magdalena River. Deposits on the bottom of the Caribbean Sea and the Gulf of Mexico have thicknesses of about 1 km (0.62 mi). Upper sedimentary layers date to the Mesozoic to Cenozoic (250 million years ago), and the lower layers to the Paleozoic to Mesozoic.

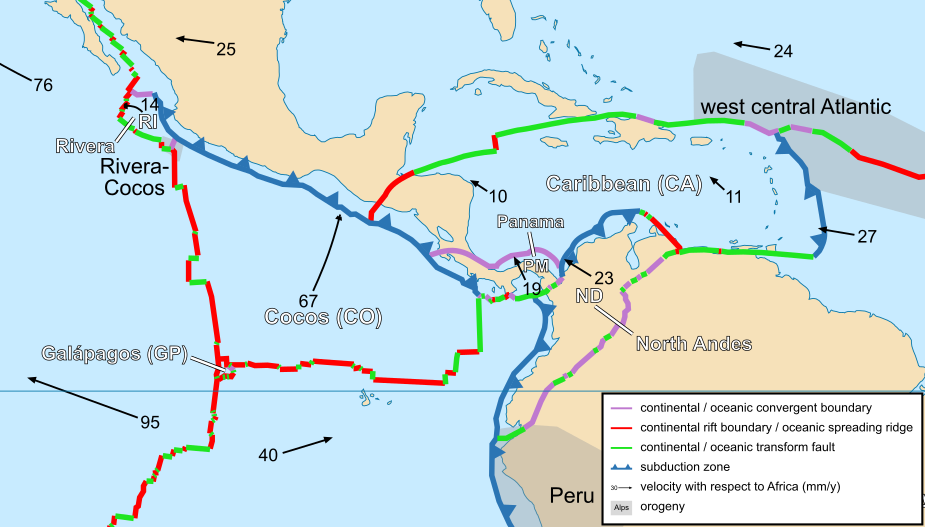
Caribbean plate tectonics

The Caribbean seafloor is divided into five basins (the Yucatan, Cayman, Colombian, Venezuelan, and Grenada Basins) separated from one another by underwater ridges and mountain ranges (the Cayman Ridge, the Nicaraguan Rise, the Beata Ridge, and the Aves Ridge). Atlantic Ocean water enters the Caribbean through the Anegada Passage between the Lesser Antilles and the Virgin Islands and the Windward Passage between Cuba and Haiti.

The Yucatán Channel between Mexico and Cuba links the Gulf of Mexico with the Caribbean. The deepest points of the sea lie in Cayman Trough, with depths reaching approximately 7,686 m (25,220 ft). Despite that, the Caribbean Sea is considered relatively shallow compared to other bodies of water. The pressure of the South American Plate to the east of the Caribbean causes the Lesser Antilles to have high volcanic activity, and a severe eruption of Mount Pelée in 1902 resulted in many casualties.

The Caribbean seafloor is also the home of two oceanic trenches: the Cayman Trench and the Puerto Rico Trench, which put the area at a high risk of earthquakes. Underwater earthquakes pose a threat of generating tsunamis, which could have devastating effects on the Caribbean islands. Scientific data reveal that over the past 500 years, the area has experienced a dozen earthquakes of magnitude 7.5 or higher. Most recently, a 7.1-magnitude earthquake struck Haiti, on January 12, 2010.

- List of islands in the Caribbean

== Oceanography ==
The North Equatorial Current and the Gulf Stream

The hydrology of the sea is highly homogeneous. Annual variations in monthly average water temperatures at the surface do not exceed 3 °C (5.4 °F). In the past 50 years, the Caribbean has gone through three stages: cooling until 1974, a cold phase with peaks during 1974–1976 and 1984–1986, and, finally, a warming phase with an increase in temperature of 0.6 °C (1.1 °F) per year. Virtually all temperature extremes were associated with the phenomena of El Niño and La Niña. The salinity of the seawater is about 3.6%, and its density is 1,023.5–1,024.0 kg/m^{3} (63.90–63.93 lb/cu ft). The surface water color is blue-green to green.

The Caribbean's depth in its wider basins and deepwater temperatures are similar to those of the Atlantic Ocean. Atlantic deepwater is thought to spill into the Caribbean and contribute to the general deepwater of the Caribbean Sea. The surface water (30 m; 100 ft) acts as an extension of the northern Atlantic as the Guiana Current and part of the North Equatorial Current enter the sea on the east. On the western side of the sea, the trade winds influence a northerly current, which causes an upwelling and a rich fishery near Yucatán.

== Ecology ==
The Caribbean is the home of about 9% of the world's coral reefs, covering about 50,000 km^{2} (19,000 sq mi), most of which are located off the Caribbean islands and the Central American coast. Among them, the Belize Barrier Reef stands out, with an area of 963 km^{2} (372 sq mi), which was declared a World Heritage Site in 1996. It forms part of the Great Mayan Reef (also known as the MBRS) and, being more than 1,000 km (600 mi) in length, is the world's second longest. It runs along the Caribbean coasts of Mexico, Belize, Guatemala and Honduras.

Since 2005, unusually warm Caribbean waters have been increasingly threatening the coral reefs. Coral reefs support some of the most diverse marine habitats in the world, but they are fragile ecosystems. When tropical waters become unusually warm for extended periods of time, microscopic plants called zooxanthellae, which are symbiotic partners living within the coral polyp tissues, die off. These plants provide food for the corals and give them their color. The death and dispersal of these tiny plants is called coral bleaching and can devastate large areas of reef. More than 42% of corals are completely bleached, and 95% are experiencing some whitening. Historically, the Caribbean is thought to contain 14% of the world's coral reefs.

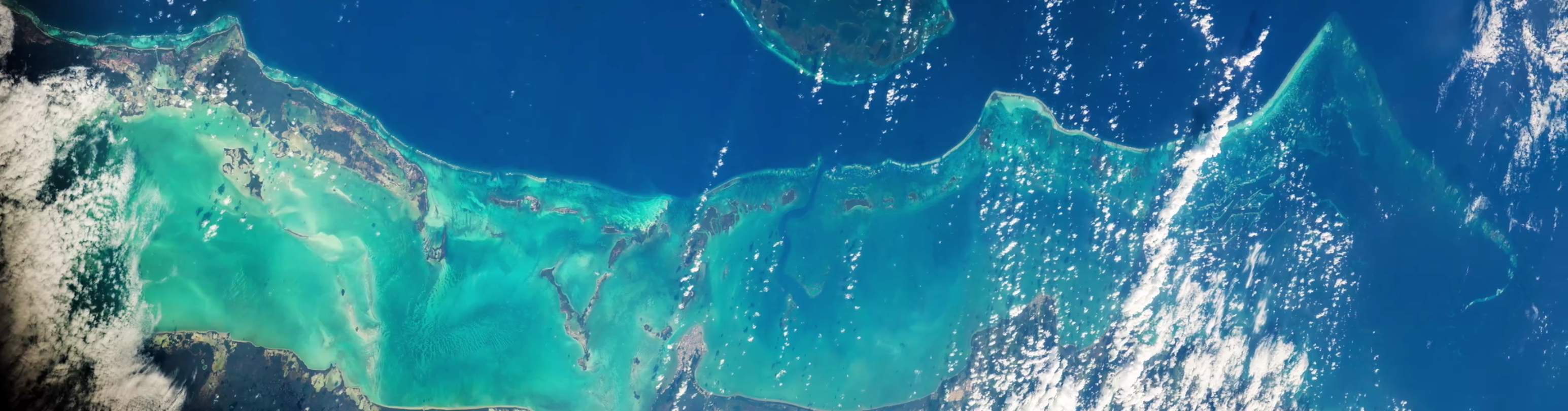
The Belize Barrier Reef viewed from the International Space Station in 2016

The habitats supported by the reefs are critical to activities such as fishing and scuba diving, and they provide an annual economic value to Caribbean nations of US$3.1–4.6 billion. Continued reef destruction could severely damage the region's economy. The Convention for the Protection and Development of the Marine Environment of the Wider Caribbean Region came into effect in 1986 to protect the various endangered marine life of the Caribbean by forbidding human activities that would advance the continued destruction of such marine life in various areas. Currently, the convention has been ratified by 15 countries. Several charitable organizations have formed to preserve Caribbean marine life, such as Sea Turtle Conservancy, which seeks to study and protect sea turtles while educating about them.

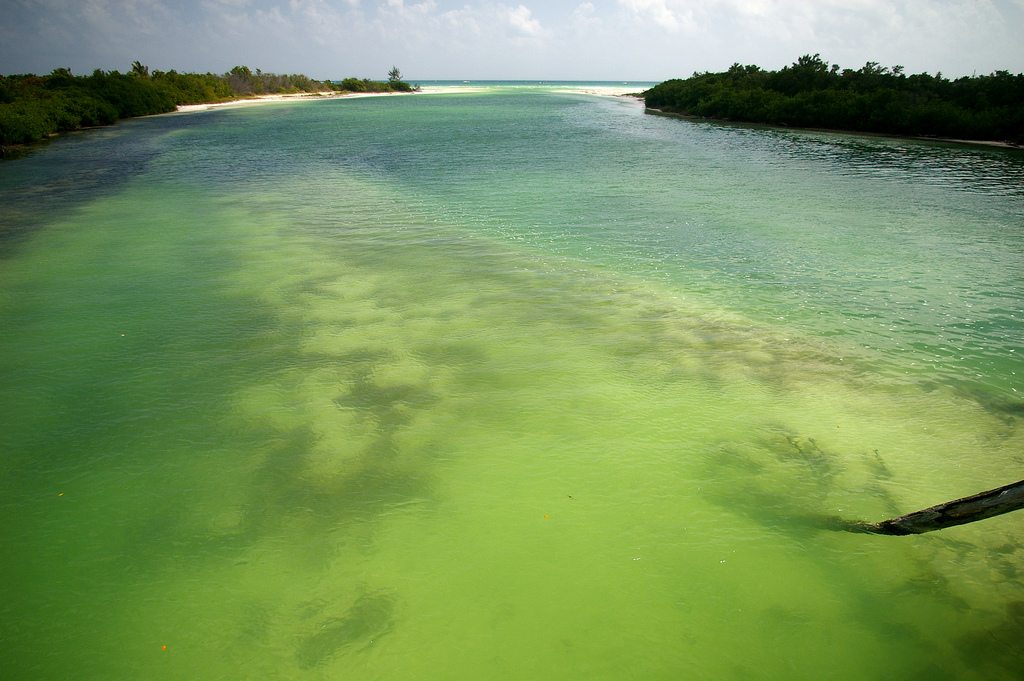
The Sian Ka'an Biosphere Reserve, Mexico

In 2012, the Institute of Marine Sciences and Limnology of the National Autonomous University of Mexico conducted a regional study funded by the Department of Technical Cooperation of the International Atomic Energy Agency, in which specialists from 11 Latin American countries (Colombia, Costa Rica, Cuba, the Dominican Republic, Guatemala, Haiti, Honduras, Mexico, Nicaragua, Panama, and Venezuela) plus Jamaica participated. The study's findings indicate that heavy metals, including mercury, arsenic, and lead, have been detected in the coastal zone of the Caribbean Sea. Analysis of toxic metals and hydrocarbons is based on the investigation of coastal sediments that have accumulated to depths of less than 50 meters over the past 150 years. Project results were presented in Vienna at the forum "Water Matters" and the 2011 General Conference of that multilateral organization.

After the Mediterranean Sea, the Caribbean Sea is the second-most-polluted sea. Pollution in the form of up to 300,000 tonnes of solid garbage dumped into the Caribbean Sea each year is progressively endangering marine ecosystems, wiping out species, and harming the livelihoods of local people, who rely primarily on tourism and fishing.

== Climate ==
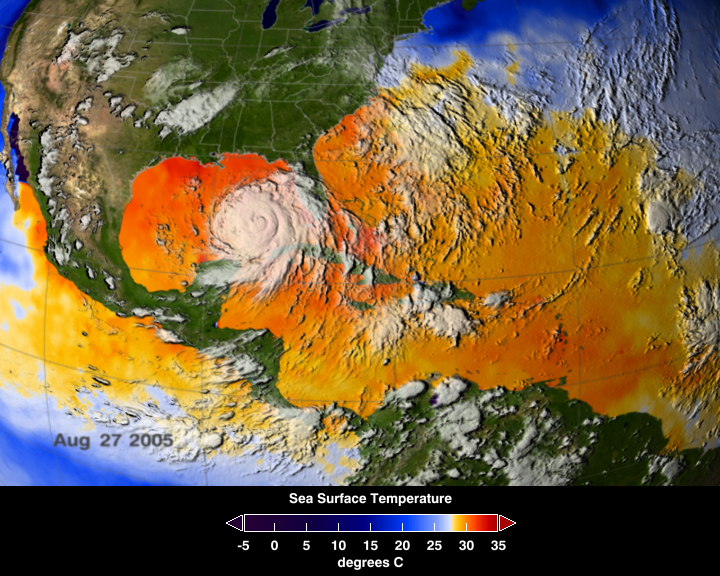
The average sea surface temperatures for the Caribbean Atlantic Ocean, 25–27 August 2005. Hurricane Katrina is seen just above Cuba.

The Caribbean's climate is driven by its low latitude and tropical ocean currents. The principal ocean current is the North Equatorial Current, which enters the region from the tropical Atlantic. The climate of the area is tropical, varying from tropical rainforest in some regions to tropical savanna in others. There are also some locations with arid climates and considerable drought in some years.

Rainfall varies with elevation, size, and water currents. Cool upwelling keeps the ABC islands arid. Warm, moist trade winds blow consistently from the east, creating both rainforest and semi-arid climates across the region. Tropical rainforest climates include lowland areas near the Caribbean Sea from Costa Rica north to Belize, as well as the Dominican Republic and Puerto Rico.

More seasonal dry tropical savanna climates are found in Cuba, northern Venezuela and Colombia, and southern Yucatán, Mexico. Arid climates are found along the extreme northern coast of Venezuela (e.g., Paraguaná Peninsula) and Colombia (e.g., Guajira Peninsula), extending to the islands, including Aruba and Curaçao, and to the northern tip of Yucatán.

Tropical cyclones are a threat to the nations that rim the Caribbean Sea. While landfalls are infrequent, the resulting loss of life and property damage makes them a significant hazard to life in the Caribbean. Tropical cyclones that impact the Caribbean often develop off the West coast of Africa and make their way west across the Atlantic Ocean toward the Caribbean, while other storms develop in the Caribbean itself. The Caribbean hurricane season runs from June to November, with most hurricanes occurring in August and September. On average, about nine tropical storms form each year, with five reaching hurricane strength. According to the National Hurricane Center, 385 hurricanes occurred in the Caribbean between 1494 and 1900.

== Flora and fauna ==
The region has a high level of biodiversity, and many species are endemic to the Caribbean.

=== Vegetation ===
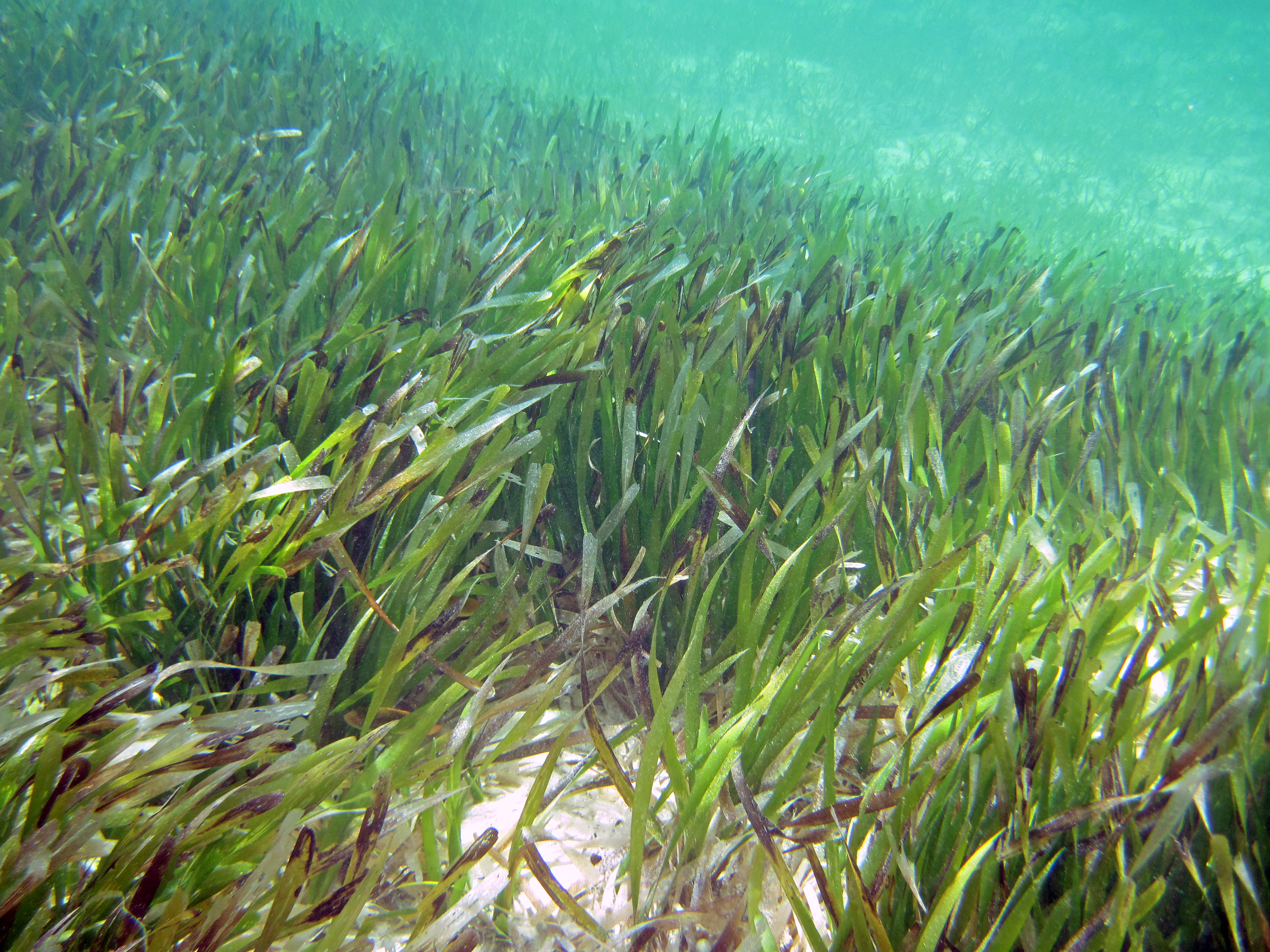
Turtle grass (Thalassia testudinum) meadow in San Salvador Island

The vegetation of the region is mostly tropical, but differences in topography, soil, and climatic conditions increase species diversity. Where porous limestone terraced islands occur, they are generally poor in nutrients. It is estimated that 13,000 species of plants grow in the Caribbean, of which 6,500 are endemic. For example, guaiac wood (Guaiacum officinale), the flower of which is the national flower of Jamaica and the Bayahibe rose (Pereskia quisqueyana) which is the national flower of the Dominican Republic and the ceiba which is the national tree of both Puerto Rico and Guatemala. The mahogany is the national tree of the Dominican Republic and Belize. The caimito (Chrysophyllum cainito) grows throughout the Caribbean. In coastal zones, coconut palms are found, and in lagoons and estuaries are found thick areas of black mangrove and red mangrove (Rhizophora mangle).

In shallow water, flora and fauna are concentrated around coral reefs where there is little variation in water temperature, purity, and salinity. Leeward sides of lagoons provide areas of growth for sea grasses. Turtle grass (Thalassia testudinum) is common in the Caribbean, as is manatee grass (Syringodium filiforme), which can grow together as well as in fields of single species at depths up to 20 m (66 ft). Another type of shoal grass (Halodule wrightii) grows on sand and mud surfaces at depths of up to 5 m (16 ft).

In brackish water of harbours and estuaries at depths less than 2.5 m (8 ft 2 in) widgeongrass (Ruppia maritima) grows. Representatives of three species belonging to the genus Halophila, (Halophila baillonii, Halophila engelmannii and Halophila decipiens) are found at depths of up to 30 m (98 ft) except for Halophila engelmani which does not grow below 5 m (16 ft) and is confined to the Bahamas, Florida, the Greater Antilles and the western part of the Caribbean. Halophila baillonii has been found only in the Lesser Antilles.

=== Fauna ===
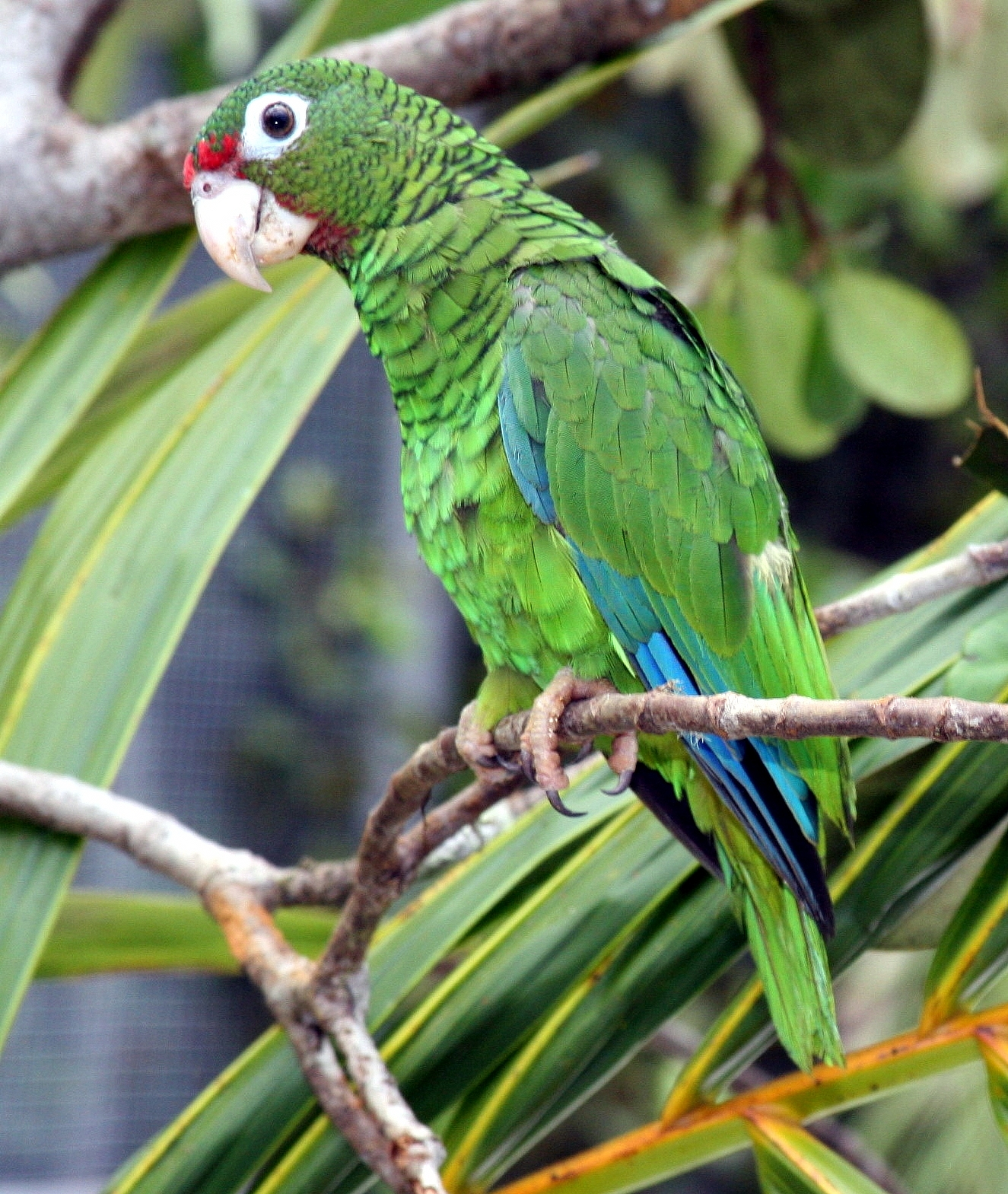
Puerto Rican parrot

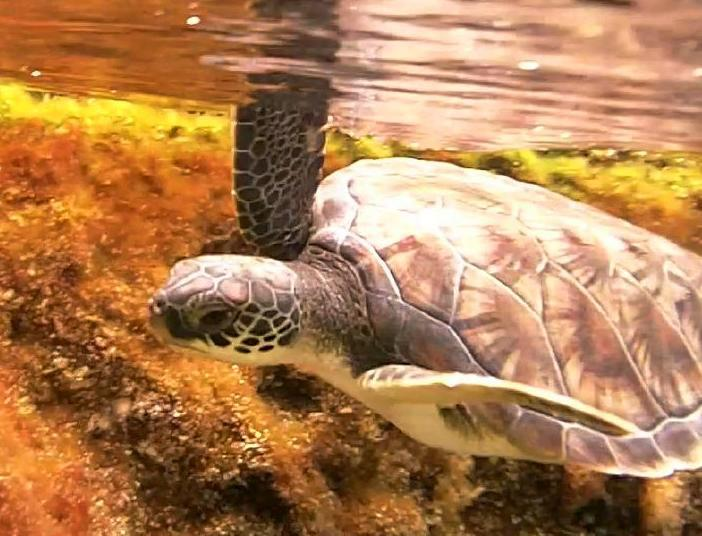
Green sea turtle, Grand Cayman Island

Marine biota in the region have representatives of both the Indian and Pacific oceans, which were caught in the Caribbean before the emergence of the Isthmus of Panama four million years ago. In the Caribbean Sea there are around 1,000 documented species of fish, including sharks (bull shark, tiger shark, silky shark and Caribbean reef shark), flying fish, giant oceanic manta ray, angel fish, spotfin butterflyfish, parrotfish, Atlantic Goliath grouper, tarpon and moray eels. Throughout the Caribbean, there is industrial catching of lobster and sardines (off the coast of Yucatán Peninsula).

There are 90 species of mammals in the Caribbean, including sperm whales, humpback whales, and dolphins. The island of Jamaica is home to seals and manatees. The Caribbean monk seal, which lived in the Caribbean, is considered extinct. Solenodons and hutias are mammals found only in the Caribbean; only one extant species is not endangered.

There are 500 species of reptiles, 94% of which are endemic. Islands are home to some endemic species, such as rock iguanas and American crocodile. The blue iguana, endemic to the island of Grand Cayman, is endangered. The green iguana is invasive to Grand Cayman. The Mona ground iguana, which inhabits the island of Mona, Puerto Rico, is endangered. The rhinoceros iguana on the island of Hispaniola, which is shared between Haiti and the Dominican Republic, is also endangered. The region has several types of sea turtle (loggerhead, green turtle, hawksbill, leatherback turtle, Atlantic ridley and olive ridley). Some species are threatened with extinction. Their populations have been greatly reduced since the 17th century – the number of green turtles has declined from 91 million to 300,000 and hawksbill turtles from 11 million to less than 30,000 by 2006.

All 170 amphibian species in the region are endemic. The habitats of almost all members of the toad family, poison dart frogs, tree frogs and leptodactylidae (a type of frog) are limited to only one island. The golden coqui is in serious threat of extinction.

In the Caribbean, 600 species of birds have been recorded, of which 163 are endemic such as todies, Fernandina's flicker and palmchat. The American yellow warbler is found in many areas, as is the green heron. Of the endemic species, 48 are threatened with extinction, including the Puerto Rican amazon and the Zapata wren. According to BirdLife International, in 2006 in Cuba, 29 bird species were threatened with extinction, and two species were officially extinct. The black-fronted piping guan is endangered. The Antilles and Central America lie in the flight path of migrating birds from North America, so population sizes are subject to seasonal fluctuations. Parrots and bananaquits are found in forests. Over the open sea, frigatebirds and tropicbirds can be seen.

== Economy and human activity ==
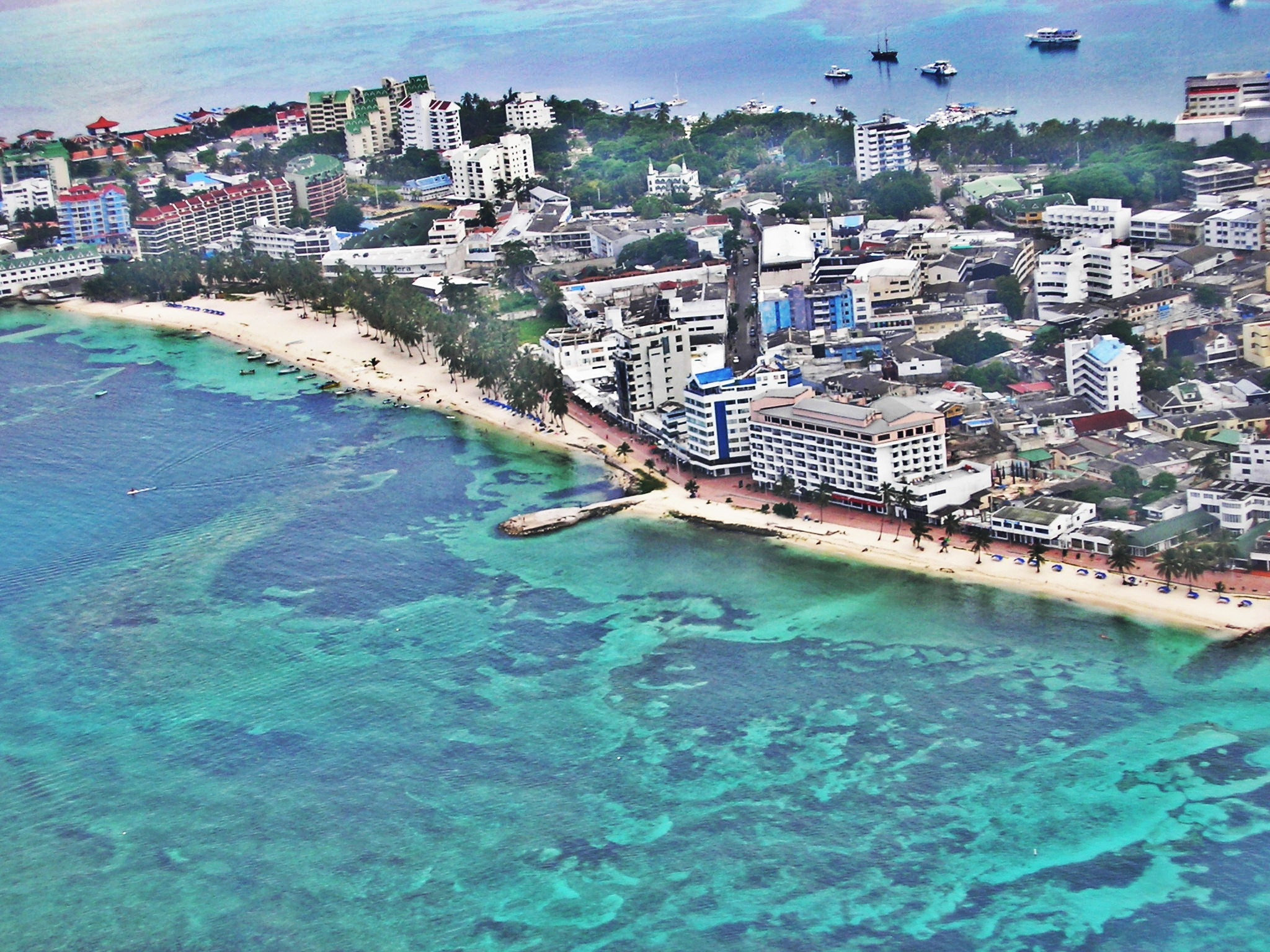
A view of San Andrés island, Colombia

The Caribbean region has seen a significant increase in human activity since colonization. The sea is one of the largest oil production areas in the world, producing approximately 170 million tons per year. The area also generates a large fishing industry for the surrounding countries, accounting for 500,000 tonnes (490,000 long tons; 550,000 short tons) of fish a year.

Human activity in the area contributes significantly to pollution. In 1993, it was estimated that only about 10% of the sewage from the Central American and Caribbean Island countries was properly treated before being released into the sea. The region has been famous for its rum production - the drink is first mentioned in records from Barbados in around 1650, although it was likely to have been produced beforehand across the other islands.

The Caribbean region supports a large tourism industry. The Caribbean Tourism Organization calculates that about 12 million people a year visit the area, including (in 1991–1992) about 8 million cruise ship tourists. Tourism based upon scuba diving and snorkeling on coral reefs of many Caribbean islands makes a major contribution to their economies.

== Gallery ==
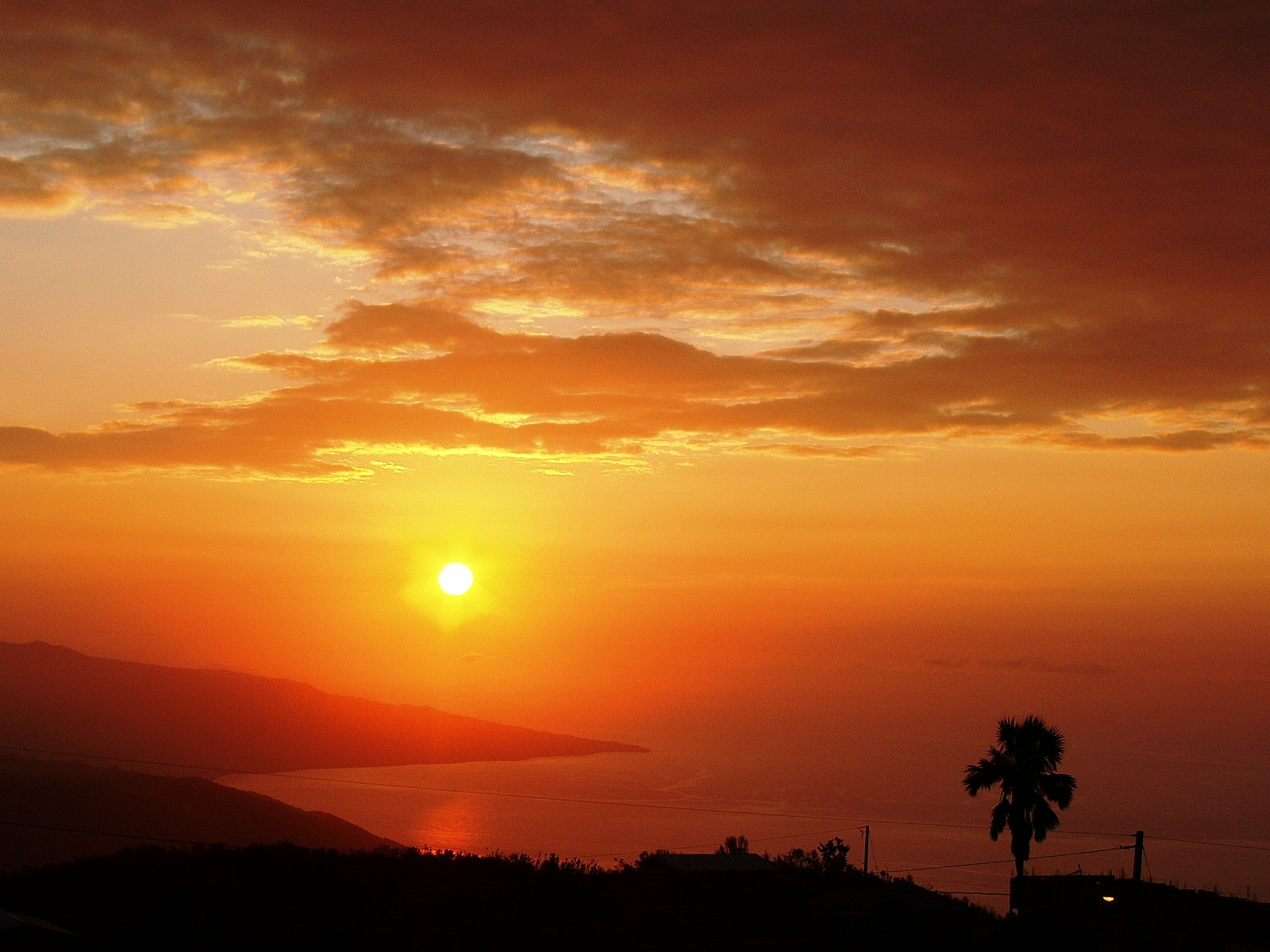
Sunrise over the south beach of Jamaica

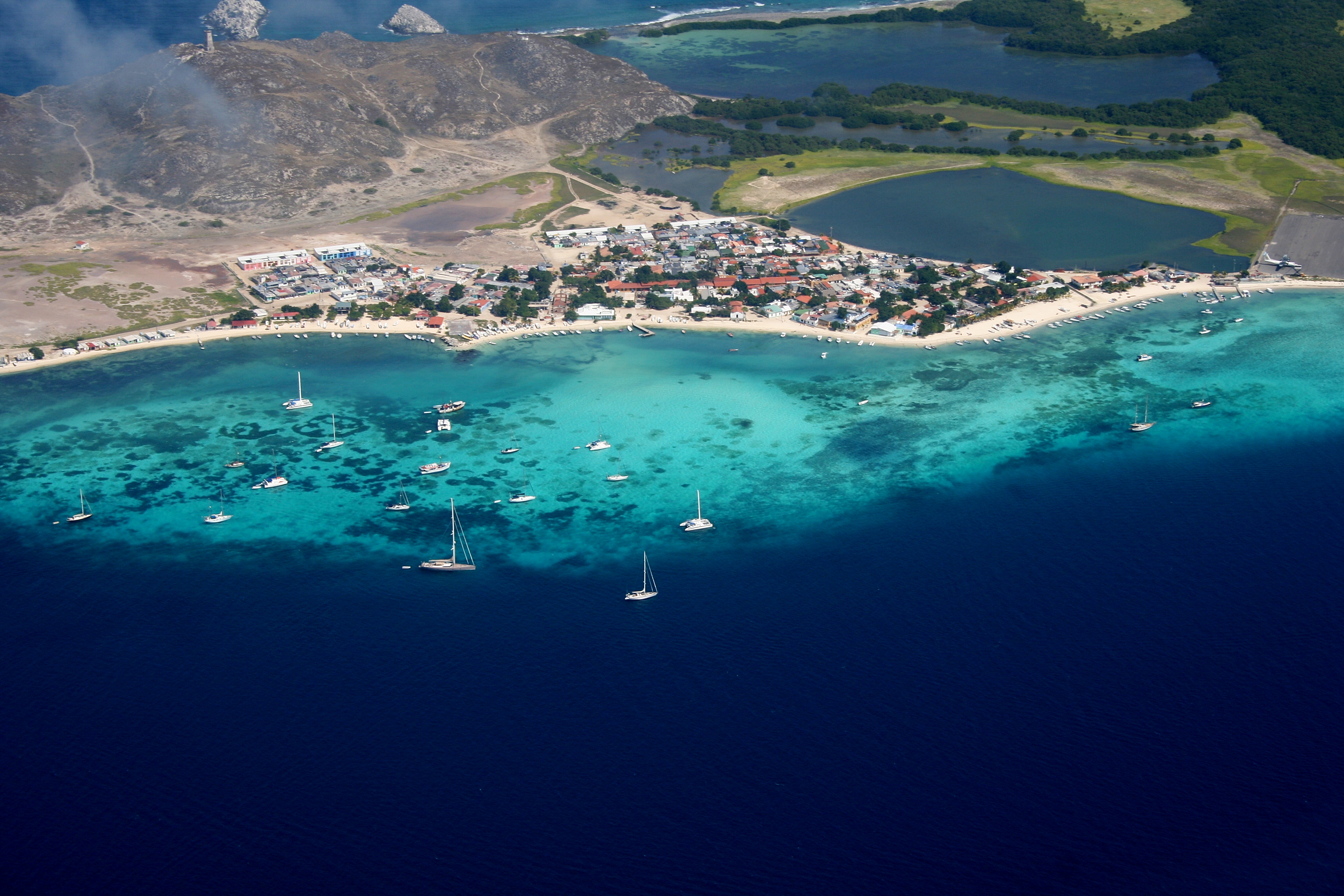
Los Roques Archipelago, Venezuela

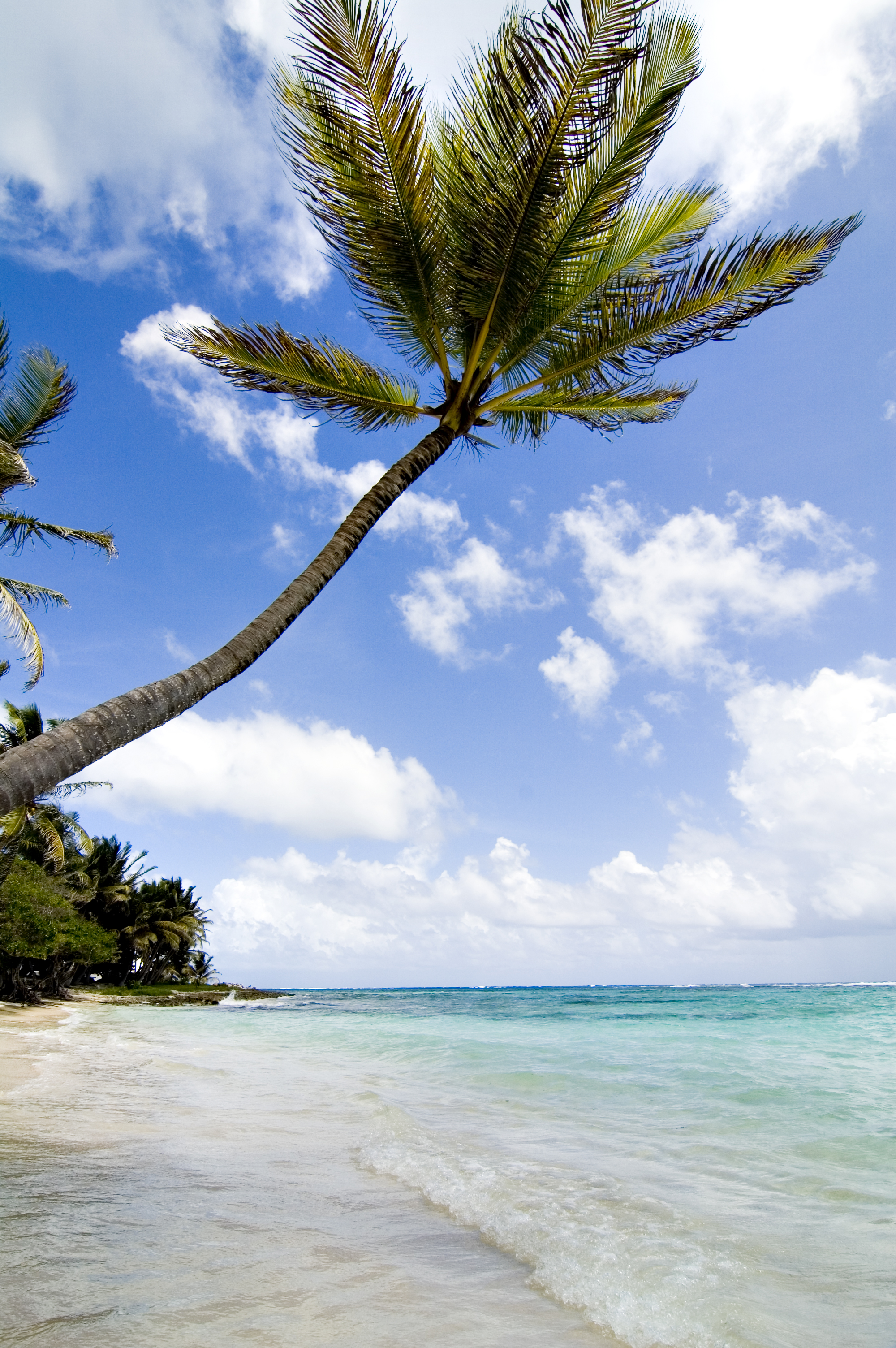
Marie Galante, Guadeloupe

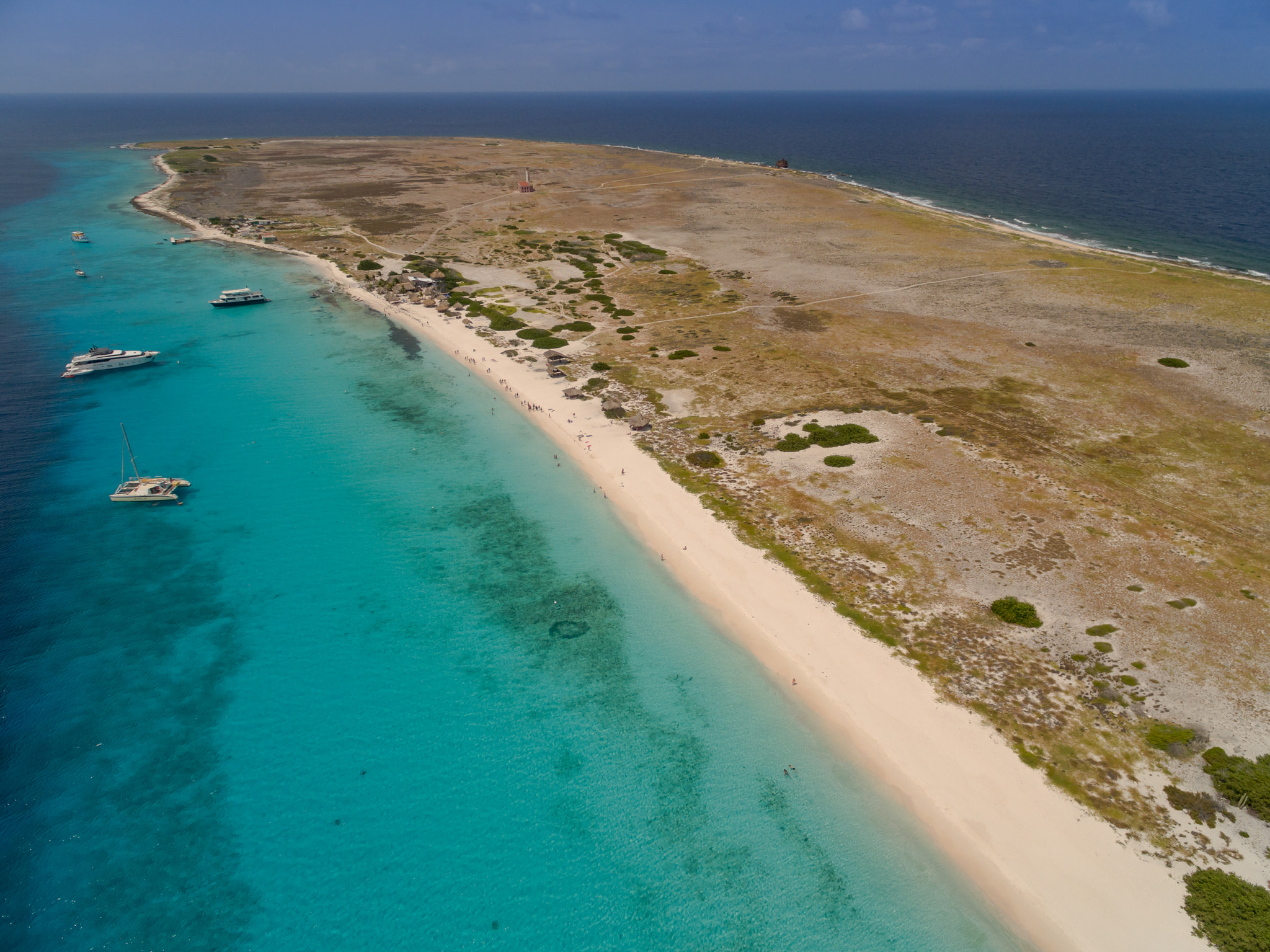
Beach of Curaçao

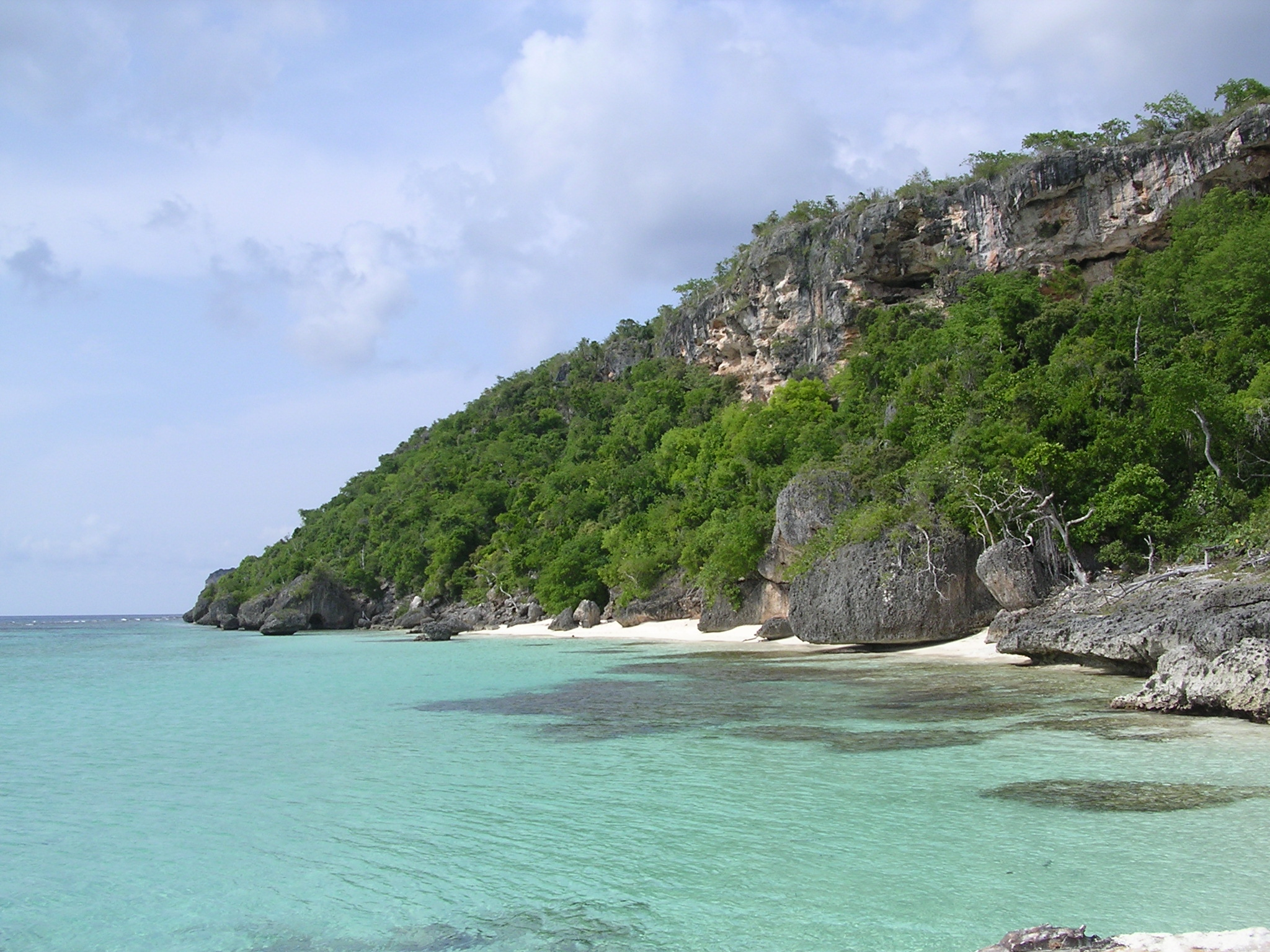
Mona Island, Puerto Rico

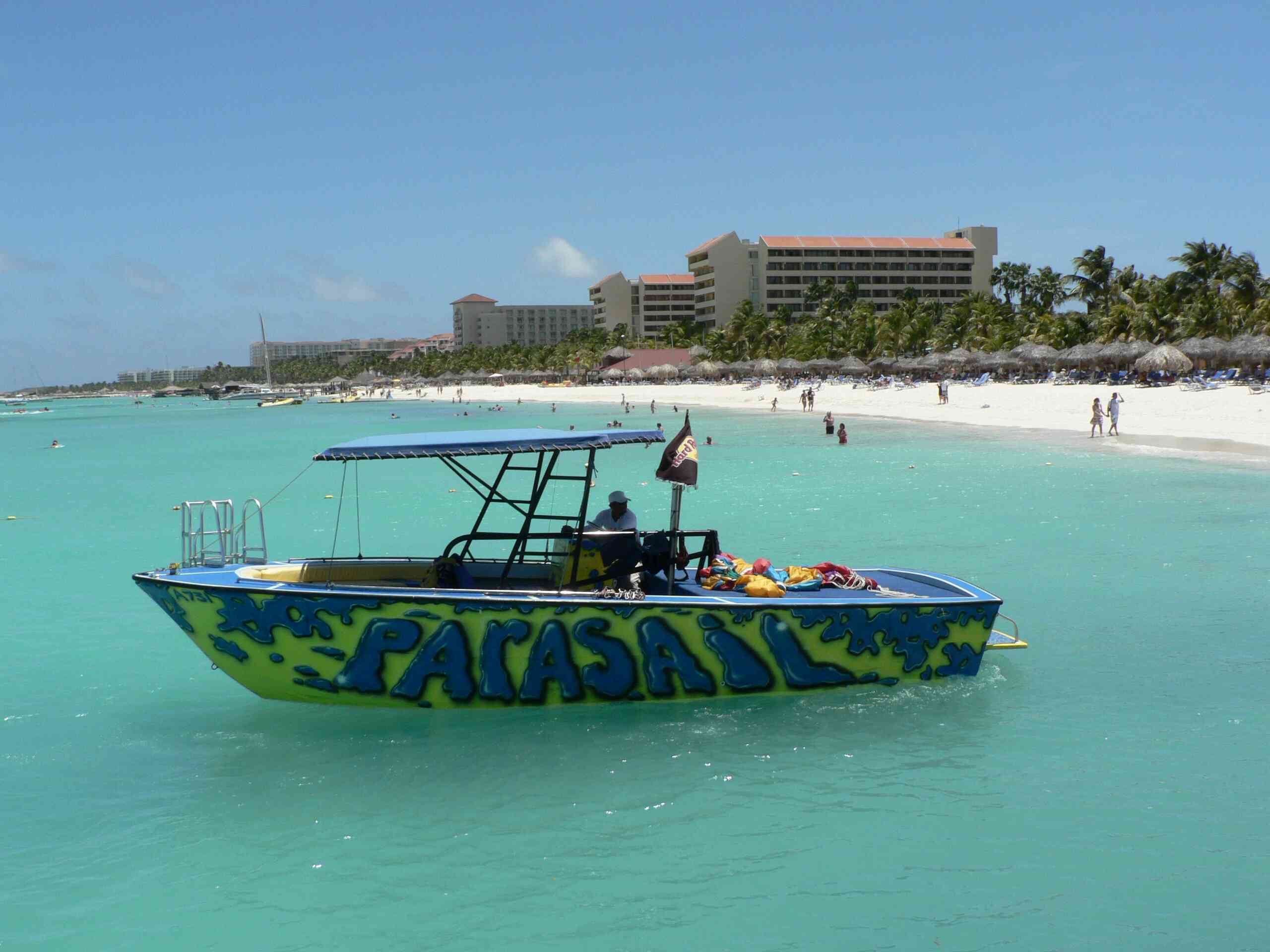
Palm Beach, Aruba

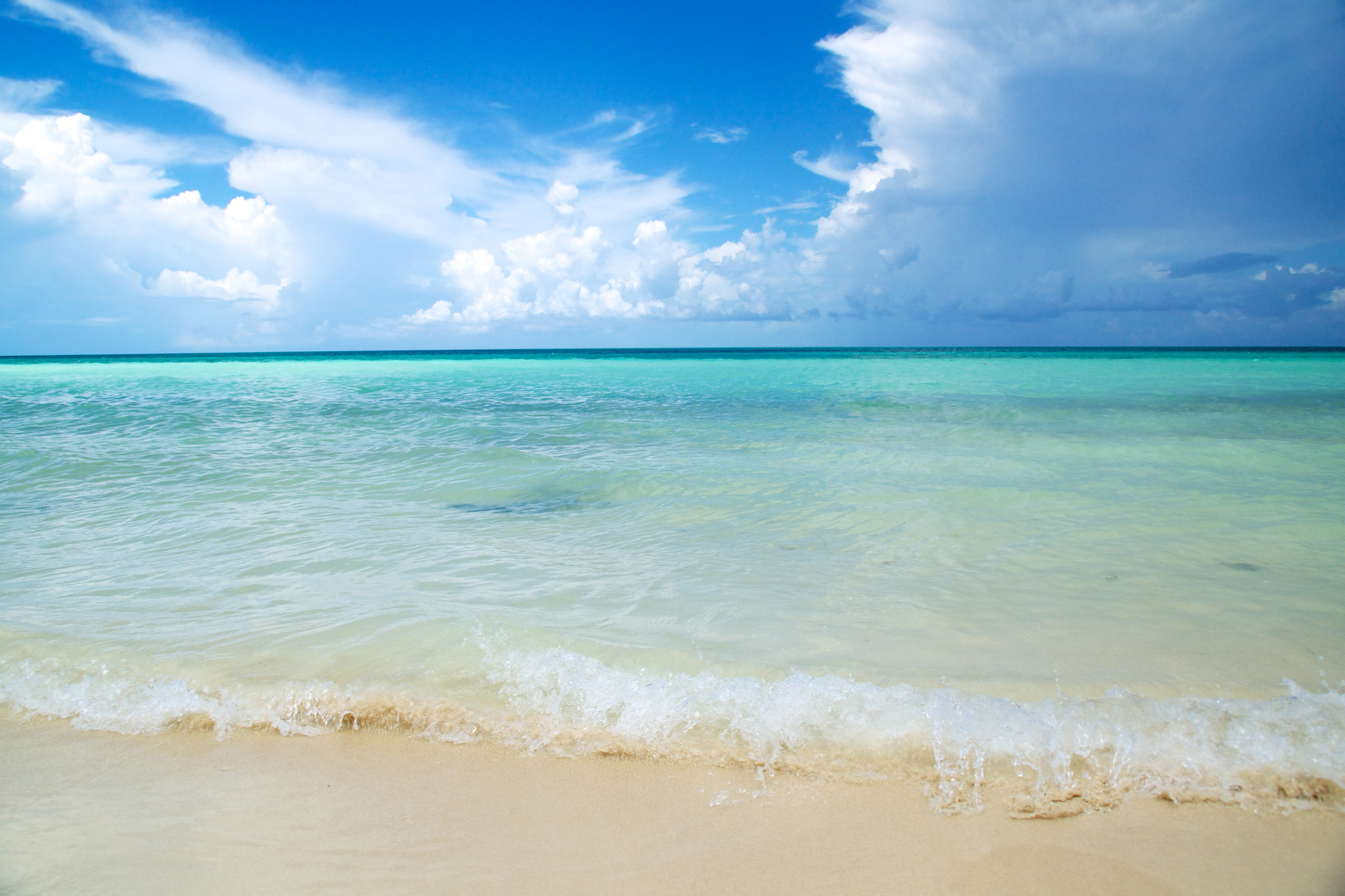
Cayo Coco, Cuba

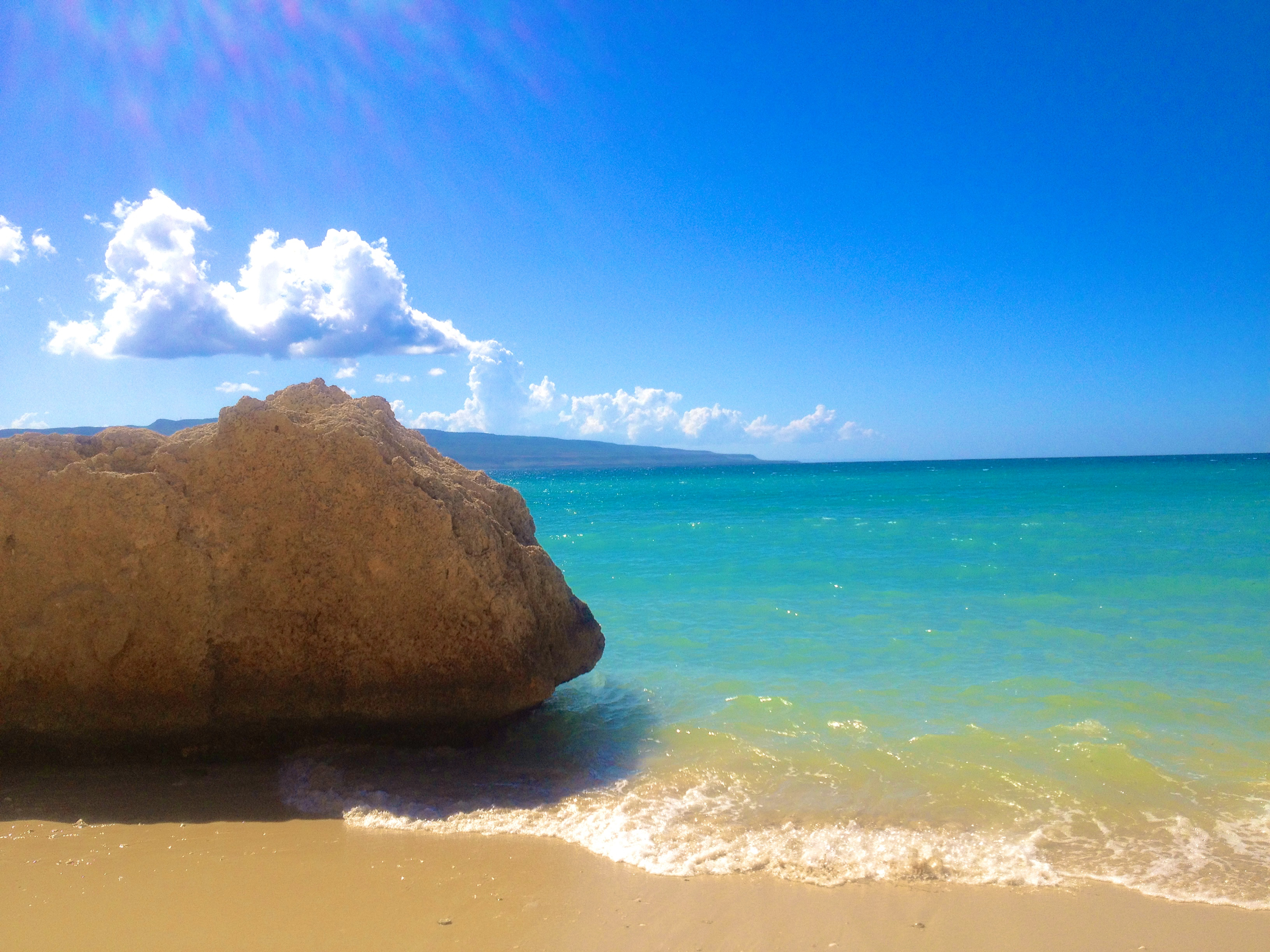
Saint-Marc, Haiti

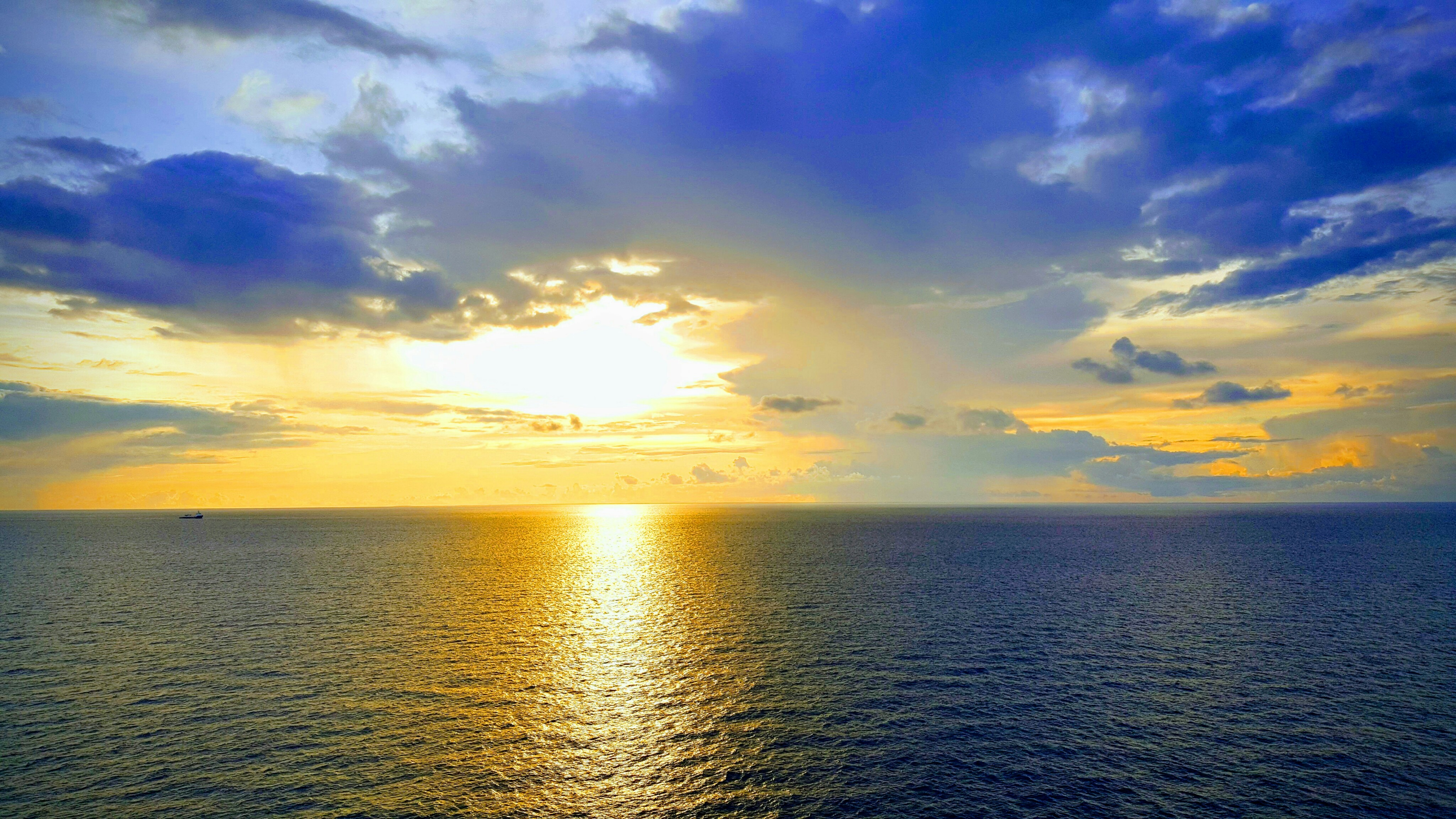
Sunset in the Caribbean Sea

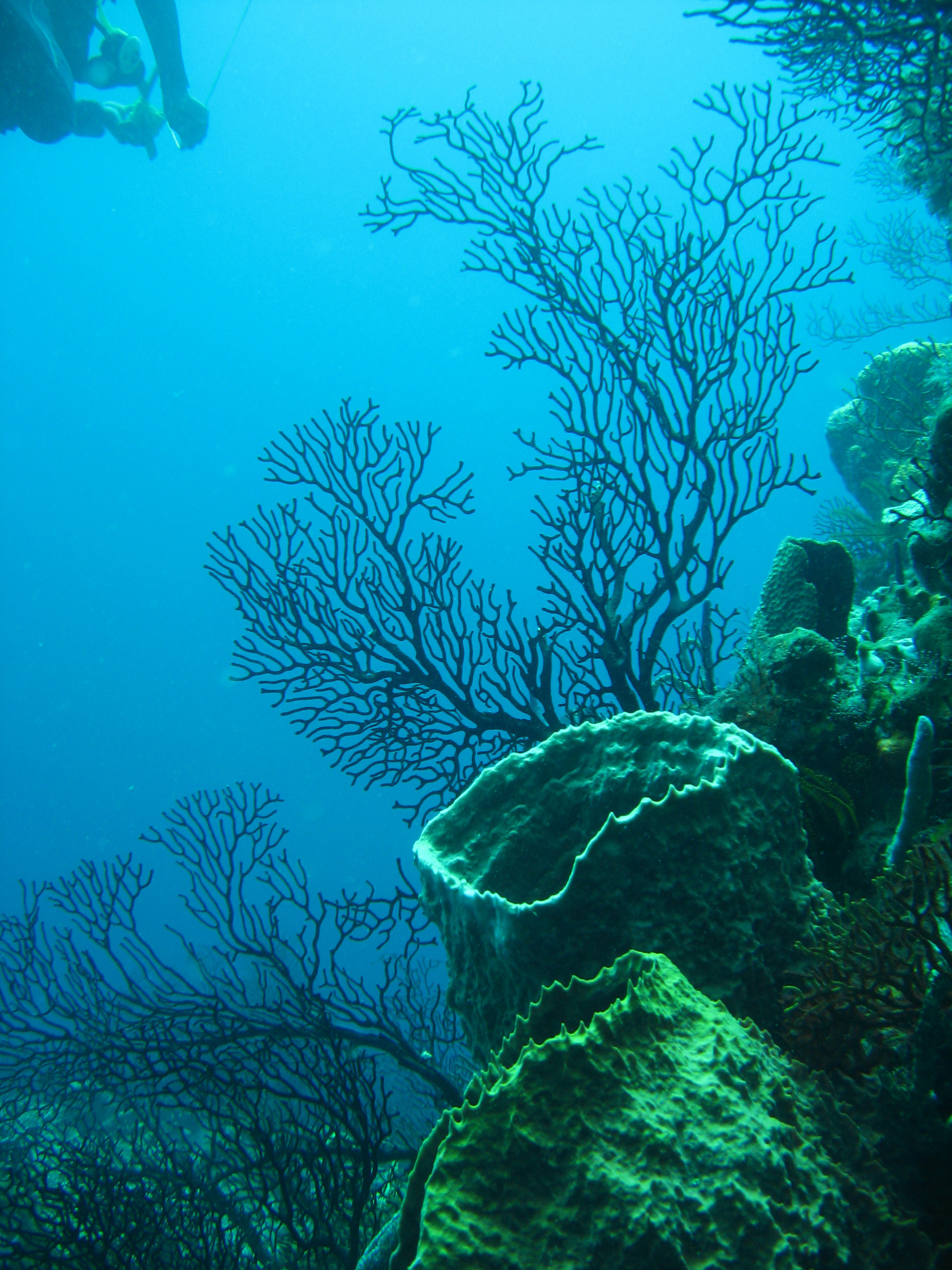
Coral reef near Soufrière Quarter, Saint Lucia

== See also ==
- American Mediterranean Sea
- Greater Antilles
- Hispanic America
- Ibero-America
- Intra-Americas Sea
- Kick 'em Jenny
- Latin America
- Lesser Antilles
- List of Caribbean islands
- List of Caribbean Countries
- List of Caribbean countries by population
- Piracy in the Caribbean
- Territorial evolution of the Caribbean
- West Indies
