= List of seas on Earth =

Marginal seas as defined by the International Hydrographic Organization

This is a list of seas of the World Ocean, including marginal seas, areas of water, various gulfs, bights, bays, and straits. In many cases it is a matter of tradition for a body of water to be named a sea or a bay, etc., therefore all these types are listed here. Entities called "seas" which are not divisions of the World Ocean are not included in this list, nor are ocean gyres.

== Terminology ==
- Ocean – the four to seven largest named bodies of water in the World Ocean, all of which have "ocean" in the name.
- Sea has several definitions: (Note: There is no accepted technical definition of sea among oceanographers. A rather weak definition is that a sea is a subdivision of an ocean, which means that it must have oceanic basin crust on its floor. This definition, for example, accepts the Caspian Sea, which was once part of an ancient ocean, as a sea. The Introduction to Marine Biology defines a sea as a "landlocked" body of water, adding that the term "sea" is only one of convenience, but the book is written by marine biologists, not oceanographers. The Glossary of Mapping Sciences similarly states that the boundaries between seas and other bodies of water are arbitrary.)
  - A division of an ocean, delineated by landforms, currents (e.g., Sargasso Sea), or specific latitude or longitude boundaries. This includes but is not limited to marginal seas, and this is the definition used for inclusion in this list.
  - A marginal sea is a division of an ocean, partially enclosed by islands, archipelagos, or peninsulas, adjacent to or widely open to the open ocean at the surface, and/or bounded by submarine ridges on the sea floor.
  - The World Ocean. For example, the Law of the Sea states that all of the World Ocean is "sea", (Note: According to this definition, the Caspian would be excluded as it is legally an "international lake".) and this is also common usage for "the sea".
  - Any large body of water with "sea" in the name, including lakes.
- River – a narrow strip of water that flows over land from a higher elevation to a lower one
- Tributary – a small river that flows into a larger one
- Estuary – the piece of a river that flows into the sea or ocean
- Strait – a narrow area of water connecting two wider areas of water, also sometimes known as a passage
- Channel – usually wider than a strait
- Passage – connects waters between islands, also sometimes known as a strait
- Canal – a human-made channel
- Fjard – a large open water between groups of islands

There are several terms used for bulges of ocean that result from indentations of land, which overlap in definition, and which are not consistently differentiated:

- Bay – generic term; though most features with "bay" in the name are small, some are very large
- Gulf – a very large bay, often a top-level division of an ocean or sea
- Fjord – a long bay with steep sides, typically formed by a glacier
- Bight – a bay that is typically shallower than a sound
- Sound – a large, wide bay which is typically deeper than a bight or a strait
- Cove – a small, typically sheltered bay with a relatively narrow entrance
- Inlet – a narrow and long bay similar to a land peninsula, but adjoining the sea
- Polynya – least used of these terms, a patch of water surrounded by ice

Many features could be considered to be more than one of these, and all of these terms are used in place names inconsistently; especially bays, gulfs, and bights, which can be very large or very small. This list includes large areas of water no matter the term used in the name.

== Largest seas by area ==
The largest terrestrial seas, in decreasing order of area, are:

1. Philippine Sea – 5.695 million km^{2} (2.199 million sq mi)
2. Coral Sea – 4.791 million km^{2} (1.850 million sq mi)
3. American Mediterranean Sea – 4.200 million km^{2} (1.622 million sq mi)
4. Arabian Sea – 3.862 million km^{2} (1.491 million sq mi)
5. Sargasso Sea – 3.5 million km^{2} (1.4 million sq mi)
6. South China Sea – 3.5 million km^{2} (1.4 million sq mi)
7. Weddell Sea – 2.8 million km^{2} (1.1 million sq mi)
8. Caribbean Sea – 2.754 million km^{2} (1.063 million sq mi)
9. Mediterranean Sea – 2.510 million km^{2} (0.969 million sq mi)
10. Gulf of Guinea – 2.35 million km^{2} (0.91 million sq mi)
11. Tasman Sea – 2.3 million km^{2} (0.89 million sq mi)
12. Bay of Bengal – 2.172 million km^{2} (0.839 million sq mi)
13. Bering Sea – 2 million km^{2} (0.77 million sq mi)
14. Sea of Okhotsk – 1.583 million km^{2} (0.611 million sq mi)
15. Gulf of Mexico – 1.550 million km^{2} (0.598 million sq mi)
16. Gulf of Alaska – 1.533 million km^{2} (0.592 million sq mi)
17. Barents Sea – 1.4 million km^{2} (0.54 million sq mi)
18. Norwegian Sea – 1.383 million km^{2} (0.534 million sq mi)
19. East China Sea – 1.249 million km^{2} (0.482 million sq mi)
20. Hudson Bay – 1.23 million km^{2} (0.47 million sq mi)
21. Greenland Sea – 1.205 million km^{2} (0.465 million sq mi)
22. Somov Sea – 1.15 million km^{2} (0.44 million sq mi)
23. Mar de Grau – 1.14 million km^{2} (0.44 million sq mi)
24. Riiser-Larsen Sea – 1.138 million km^{2} (0.439 million sq mi)
25. Sea of Japan – 1.05 million km^{2} (0.41 million sq mi)
26. Argentine Sea – 1 million km^{2} (0.39 million sq mi)
27. East Siberian Sea – 987,000 km^{2} (381,000 sq mi)
28. Kara Sea – 926,000 km^{2} (358,000 sq mi)
29. Scotia Sea – 900,000 km^{2} (350,000 sq mi)
30. Labrador Sea – 841,000 km^{2} (325,000 sq mi)
31. Andaman Sea – 797,700 km^{2} (308,000 sq mi)
32. Laccadive Sea – 786,000 km^{2} (303,000 sq mi)
33. Irminger Sea – 780,000 km^{2} (300,000 sq mi)
34. Solomon Sea – 720,000 km^{2} (280,000 sq mi)
35. Mozambique Channel – 700,000 km^{2} (270,000 sq mi)
36. Baffin Bay – 689,000 km^{2} (266,000 sq mi)
37. Laptev Sea – 662,000 km^{2} (256,000 sq mi)
38. Arafura Sea – 650,000 km^{2} (250,000 sq mi)
39. Ross Sea – 637,000 km^{2} (246,000 sq mi)
40. Chukchi Sea – 620,000 km^{2} (240,000 sq mi)
41. Timor Sea – 610,000 km^{2} (240,000 sq mi)
42. North Sea – 575,000 km^{2} (222,000 sq mi)
43. Bellingshausen Sea – 487,000 km^{2} (188,000 sq mi)
44. Beaufort Sea – 476,000 km^{2} (184,000 sq mi)
45. Celebes Sea – 472,000 km^{2} (182,000 sq mi)
46. Banda Sea – 470,000 km^{2} (180,000 sq mi)
47. Red Sea – 438,000 km^{2} (169,000 sq mi)
48. Black Sea – 436,000 km^{2} (168,000 sq mi)
49. Gulf of Aden – 410,000 km^{2} (160,000 sq mi)
50. Yellow Sea – 380,000 km^{2} (150,000 sq mi)
51. Baltic Sea – 377,000 km^{2} (146,000 sq mi)
52. Caspian Sea – 371,000 km^{2} (143,000 sq mi)
53. Libyan Sea – 350,000 km^{2} (140,000 sq mi)
54. Levantine Sea – 320,000 km^{2} (120,000 sq mi)
55. Java Sea – 320,000 km^{2} (120,000 sq mi)
56. Gulf of Thailand – 304,000 km^{2} (117,000 sq mi)
57. Celtic Sea – 300,000 km^{2} (120,000 sq mi)
58. Gulf of Carpentaria – 300,000 km^{2} (120,000 sq mi)
59. Tyrrhenian Sea – 275,000 km^{2} (106,000 sq mi)
60. Sulu Sea – 260,000 km^{2} (100,000 sq mi)
61. Persian Gulf – 251,000 km^{2} (97,000 sq mi)
62. Gulf of St. Lawrence – 226,000 km^{2} (87,000 sq mi)
63. Bay of Biscay – 223,000 km^{2} (86,000 sq mi)
64. Aegean Sea – 214,000 km^{2} (83,000 sq mi)
65. Gulf of Anadyr – 200,000 km^{2} (77,000 sq mi)
66. Molucca Sea – 200,000 km^{2} (77,000 sq mi)
67. Oman Sea – 181,000 km^{2} (70,000 sq mi)
68. Ionian Sea – 169,000 km^{2} (65,000 sq mi)
69. Gulf of California – 160,000 km^{2} (62,000 sq mi)
70. Balearic Sea – 150,000 km^{2} (58,000 sq mi)
71. Adriatic Sea – 138,000 km^{2} (53,000 sq mi)
72. Flores Sea – 121,000 km^{2} (47,000 sq mi)

== Marginal seas by ocean ==
Seas may be considered marginal between ocean and land, or between oceans in which case they may be treated as marginal parts of either. There is no ultimate authority on the matter.

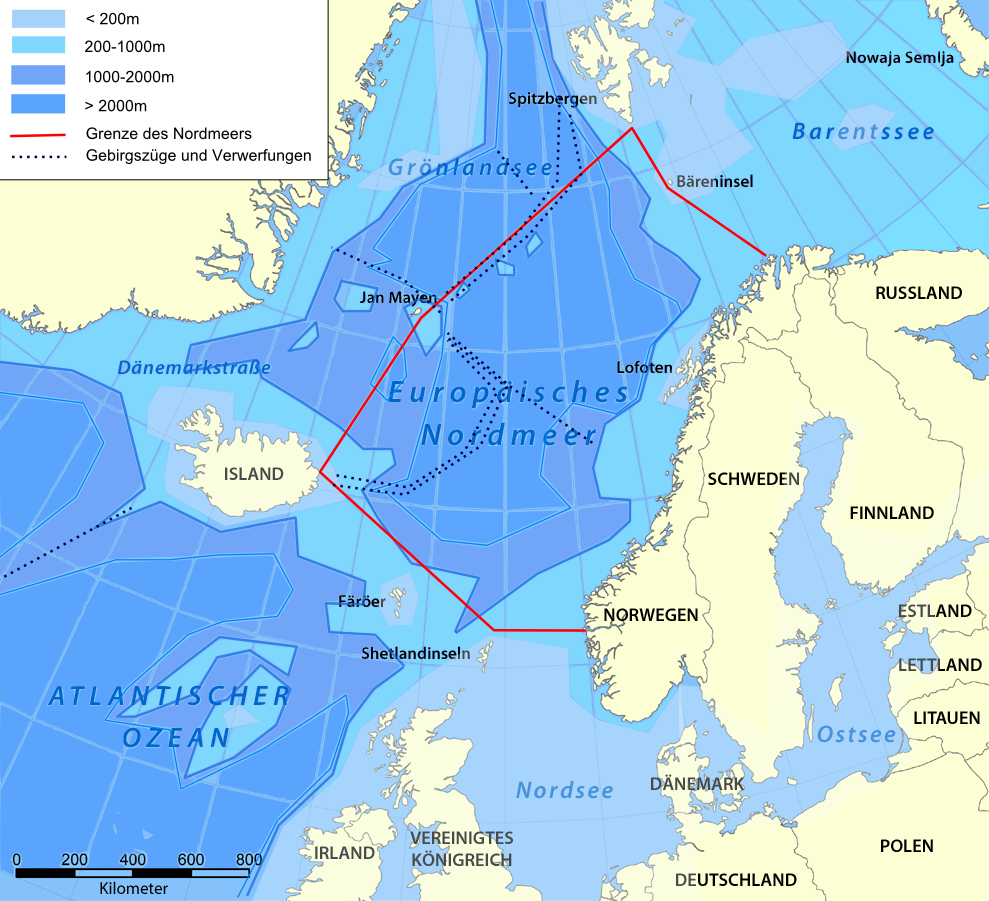
The Norwegian Sea

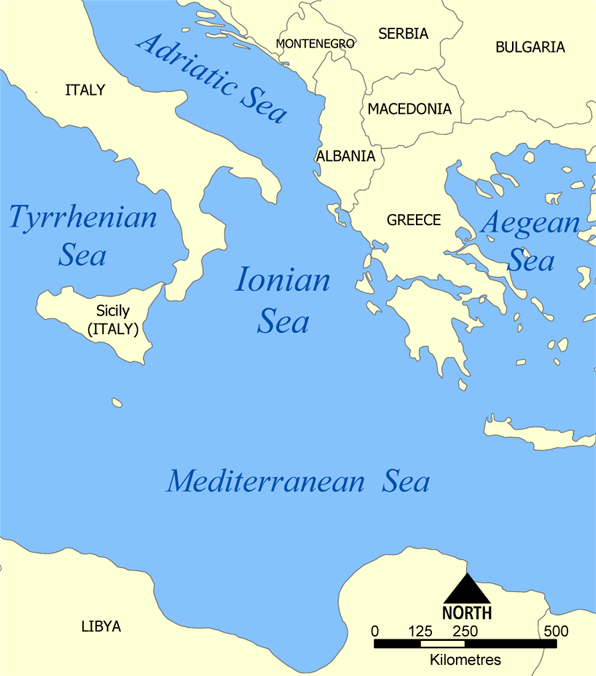
The Aegean, Adriatic, Ionian, and Tyrrhenian are all marginal seas within the Mediterranean Sea.

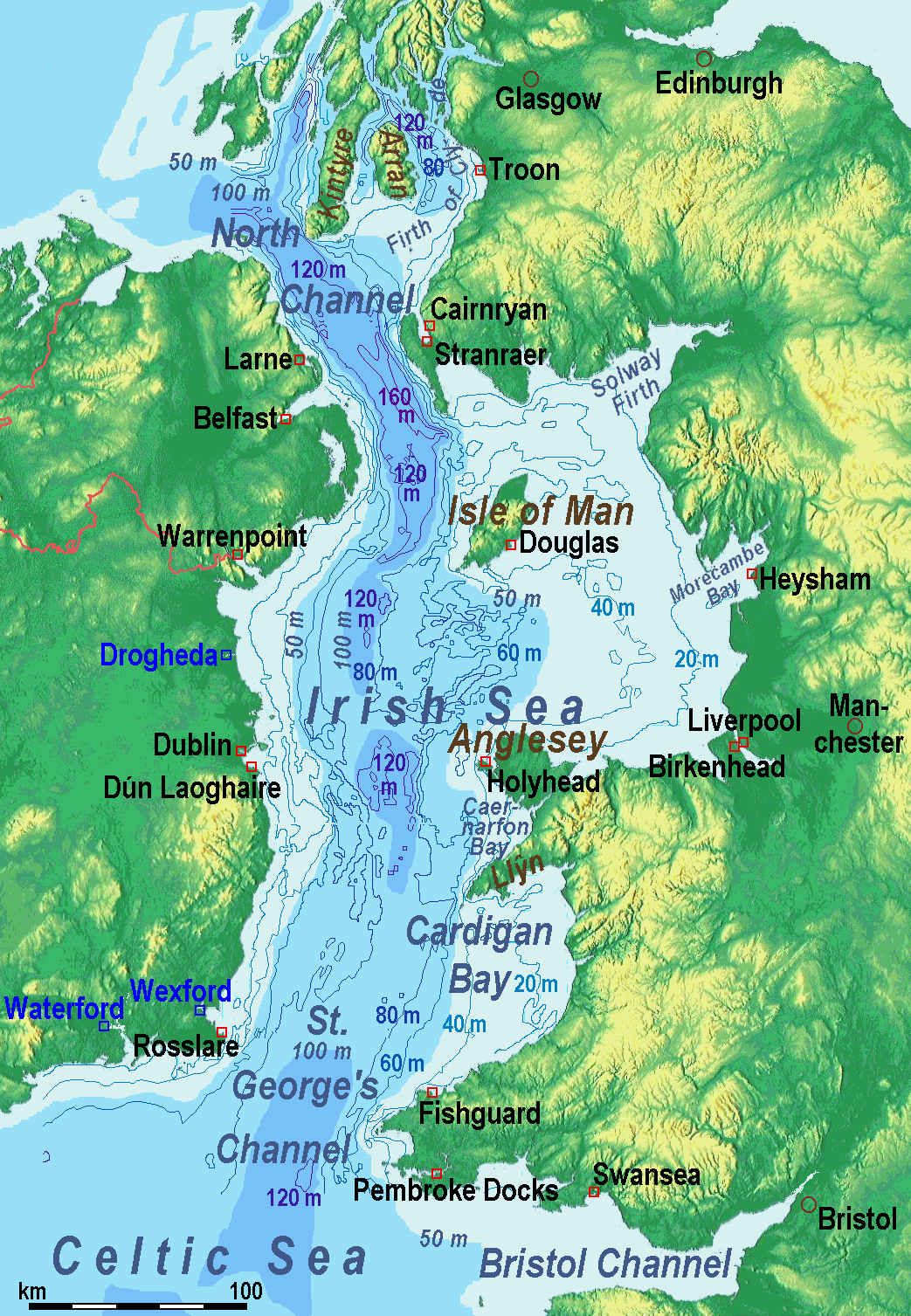
The Irish Sea

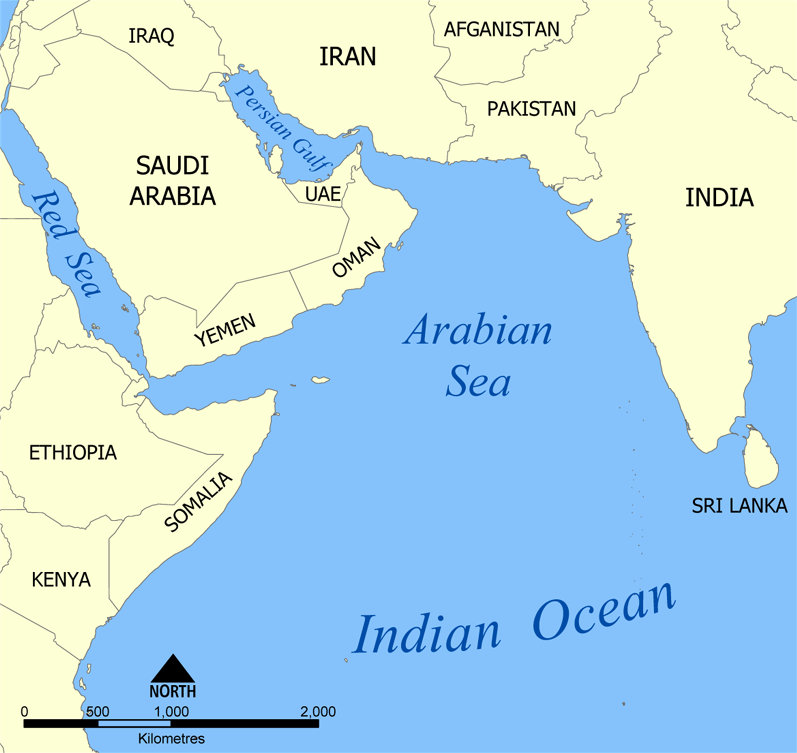
The Arabian Sea as a marginal sea of the Indian Ocean.

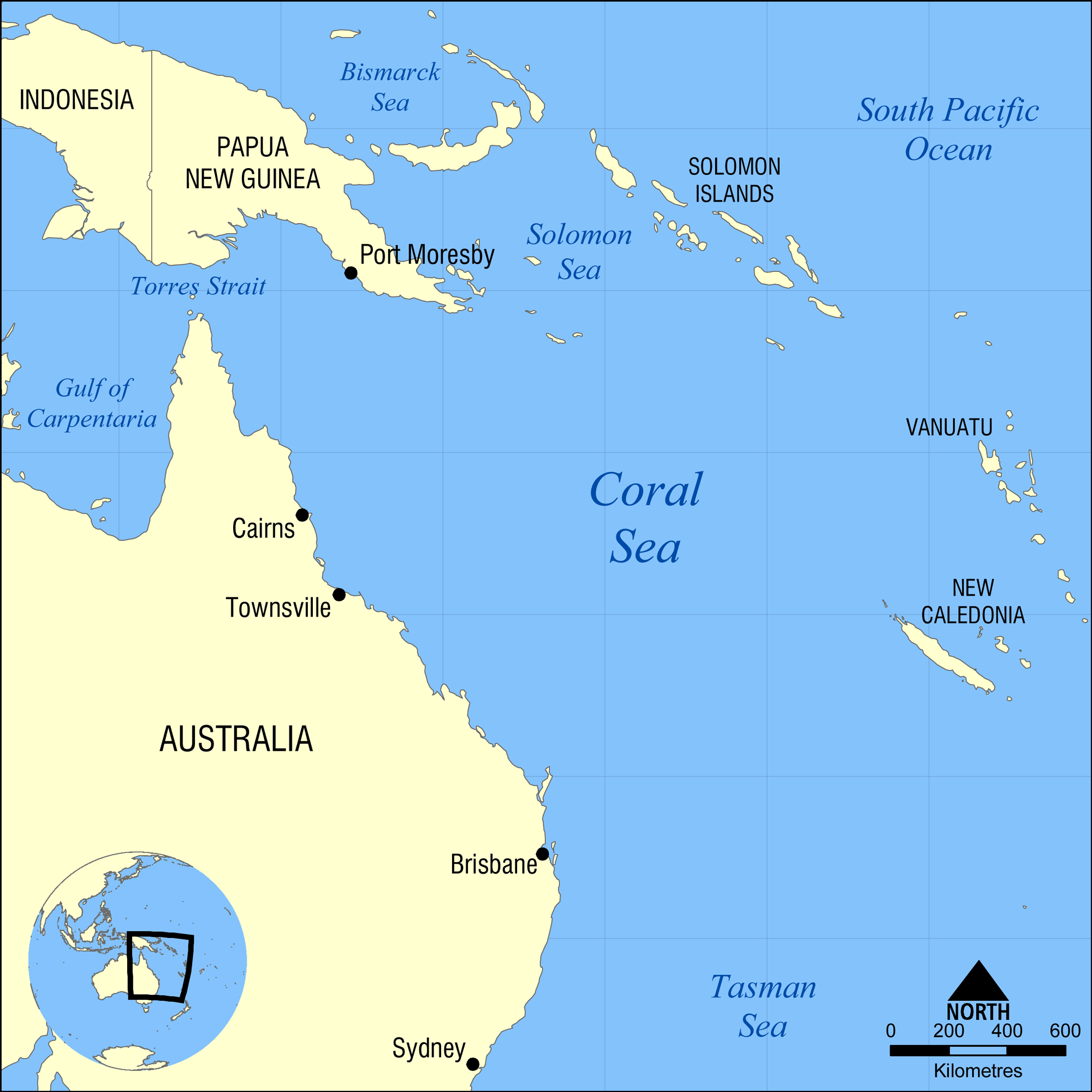
Coral Sea

=== Arctic Ocean ===
Arctic Ocean

(clockwise from 180°)

- Chukchi Sea
- East Siberian Sea
- Laptev Sea
- Kara Sea
- Barents Sea (connected to the Kara Sea by the Kara Strait)
  - Pechora Sea
  - White Sea
- Queen Victoria Sea
- Wandel Sea
- Greenland Sea
- Lincoln Sea (recognized by the IHO but not the IMO)
- Baffin Bay
- The Northwest Passages
  - Prince Gustaf Adolf Sea
  - Amundsen Gulf
- Hudson Bay
  - Foxe Basin
    - Bowman Bay
  - Wager Bay
  - Roes Welcome Sound
  - Foxe Channel
  - Bay of Gods Mercy
  - Hudson Strait
    - Ungava Bay
  - Native Bay
  - Evans Strait
  - Fisher Strait
  - James Bay
- Beaufort Sea

=== Atlantic Ocean ===
Atlantic Ocean

In addition to the marginal seas listed in the three subsections below, the Arctic Ocean is sometimes considered a marginal sea of the Atlantic.

==== Africa and Eurasia ====
- Norwegian Sea
- North Sea
  - Kattegat
  - Skagerrak
  - Wadden Sea
  - Dogger Bank
- Baltic Sea
  - Gulf of Bothnia
    - Bothnian Bay
    - Kvarken
    - Bothnian Sea
    - South Kvarken
    - Sea of Åland
  - Archipelago Sea
  - Gulf of Finland
    - Vyborg Bay
    - Neva Bay
    - Koporye Bay
    - Luga Bay
    - Narva Bay
  - Väinameri Sea
  - Gulf of Riga
  - Curonian Lagoon
  - Vistula Lagoon
  - Gdańsk Bay
  - Bay of Pomerania
  - Szczecin Lagoon
  - Bay of Greifswald
    - Rügischer Bodden
  - Strelasund
  - Bay of Lübeck
  - Bay of Kiel
  - Kalmar Strait
  - Bight of Hanö
  - Danish Straits
    - Oresund Strait
    - Fehmarn Belt
    - Great Belt
    - Little Belt
- English Channel
  - Strait of Dover
- Irish Sea
- Celtic Sea
  - Iroise Sea
- Bay of Biscay
  - Cantabrian Sea
- Gulf of Cádiz
- Mediterranean Sea
  - Alboran Sea
  - Bosporus
  - Dardanelles
  - Mar Menor
  - Balearic (Catalan) Sea
    - Gulf of Valencia
  - Gulf of Lion
    - Étang de Thau
  - Ligurian Sea
    - Gulf of Genoa
    - Gulf of Saint Florent
  - Tyrrhenian Sea
    - Gulf of Follonica
    - Gulf of Gaeta
    - Gulf of Naples
    - Gulf of Salerno
    - Gulf of Cagliari
    - Strait of Bonifacio
    - Strait of Messina
  - Adriatic Sea
    - Bay of Kotor
    - Kvarner Gulf
    - Gulf of Drin
    - Gulf of Venice
      - Gulf of Trieste
      - Venetian Lagoon
    - Gulf of Manfredonia
  - Ionian Sea
    - Gulf of Taranto
    - Straits of Corfu
    - Ambracian Gulf
    - Gulf of Patras
    - Gulf of Corinth
    - Gulf of Kyparissia
    - Messenian Gulf
    - Laconian Gulf
  - Aegean Sea
    - Myrtoan Sea
    - Argolic Gulf
    - Saronic Gulf
    - Petalioi Gulf
    - South Euboean Gulf
    - North Euboean Gulf
    - Malian Gulf
    - Pagasetic Gulf
    - Thermaic Gulf
    - Thracian Sea
      - Gulf of Saros
      - Singitic Gulf
      - Strymonian Gulf
      - Toronean Gulf
    - Edremit Gulf
    - Gulf of İzmir
    - Icarian Sea
      - Gulf of Gökova
    - Carpathian Sea
    - Sea of Crete
      - Gulf of Chania
      - Kissamou Gulf
      - Mirabello Bay
      - Souda Bay
  - Sea of Marmara
    - Gulf of İzmit
  - Levantine Sea
    - Gulf of Antalya
    - Gulf of Alexandretta
  - Libyan Sea
    - Gulf of Sidra
  - Gulf of Gabès
  - Strait of Sicily
    - Gulf of Tunis
    - Inland Sea, Gozo
  - Sea of Sardinia
    - Gulf of Asinara
- Black Sea
  - Gulf of Burgas
  - Karkinit Bay
  - Kalamita Bay
  - Sea of Azov
    - Syvash
    - Taganrog Bay
- Bay of Arguin
  - Dakhlet Nouadhibou
- Yawri Bay
- Gulf of Guinea
  - Bight of Benin
  - Bight of Biafra
    - Corisco Bay
- Luanda Bay
- Walvis Bay
- Saldanha Bay
- Table Bay
- False Bay

==== Americas ====
(coast-wise from north to south)

- North Water Polynya
- Baffin Bay
- Davis Strait
  - Home Bay
- Labrador Sea
  - Cumberland Sound
  - Frobisher Bay
- Gulf of St. Lawrence
  - Fortune Bay
  - Champlain Sea
  - Goldthwait Sea
- Gulf of Maine
  - Bay of Fundy
  - Massachusetts Bay
  - Cape Cod Bay
- Nantucket Sound
- Vineyard Sound
- Buzzards Bay
- Narragansett Bay
- Rhode Island Sound
- Block Island Sound
- Fishers Island Sound
- Long Island Sound
  - Shelter Island Sound
  - Noyack Bay
  - Peconic Bay
  - Gardiners Bay
  - Tobaccolot Bay
  - Sag Harbor Bay
  - Three Mile Harbor
  - Long Beach Bay
  - Pipes Cove
  - Southold Bay
  - Flanders Bay
  - Napeague Bay
  - Fort Pond Bay
  - North Sea Harbor
- New York Bay
  - Upper New York Bay
  - Lower New York Bay
- Jamaica Bay
- Raritan Bay
- Sandy Hook Bay
- Delaware Bay
- Chesapeake Bay
- Albemarle Sound
- Pamlico Sound
- Charleston Harbor
- Bermuda Triangle
- Biscayne Bay
- American Mediterranean Sea
  - Gulf of Mexico
    - Florida Bay
    - Tampa Bay
    - Charlotte Harbor Estuary
    - Saint Andrew Bay
    - Pensacola Bay
    - Mobile Bay
    - Vermilion Bay
    - Galveston Bay
    - Corpus Christi Bay
    - Redfish Bay
    - Bay of Campeche
  - Old Bahama Channel
  - Caribbean Sea
    - Guantánamo Bay
      - Mahomilla Bay
    - Gulf of Gonâve (Haiti)
    - Gulf of Honduras
    - Golfo de los Mosquitos
    - Gulf of Venezuela
      - Lake Maracaibo
    - Gulf of Paria
    - Gulf of Darién
- Bay of All Saints
- Guanabara Bay
- Lagoa dos Patos
- Argentine Sea
  - Samborombón Bay
  - San Matías Gulf
  - Golfo Nuevo
  - San Jorge Gulf

==== Northern islands ====
(from east to west)

- Irish Sea (between Great Britain and Ireland)
- Inner Seas off the West Coast of Scotland
  - Sea of the Hebrides (Great Britain)
- Denmark Strait (between Greenland and Iceland)
- Irminger Sea

=== Indian Ocean ===
Indian Ocean

- Andaman Sea
  - Gulf of Martaban – an arm of the Andaman Sea in the southern part of Myanmar
- Antongil Bay
- Arabian Sea
  - Gulf of Kutch
  - Gulf of Khambhat
  - Gulf of Masirah
  - Sonmiani Bay
- Bay of Bengal
  - Palk Bay
  - Palk Strait
- Gulf of Aden
- Gulf of Oman
- Laccadive Sea
  - Gulf of Mannar
- Mafia Channel
- Mentawai Strait
- Mozambique Channel
- Pemba Channel
- Persian Gulf
  - Clarence Strait (Iran)
  - Kuwait Bay
  - Gulf of Bahrain
    - Gulf of Salwah
  - Strait of Hormuz
- Red Sea
  - Bab-el-Mandeb
  - Gulf of Suez
  - Gulf of Aqaba
- Sea of Zanj
- Timor Sea
- Zanzibar Channel

=== Pacific Ocean ===
Pacific Ocean

==== Americas ====
- Bering Sea
  - Bristol Bay
  - Norton Sound
- Chilean Sea
  - Gulf of Corcovado
  - Gulf of Penas
  - Moraleda Channel
  - Reloncaví Sound
  - Sea of Chiloé
- Gulf of Alaska
  - Cook Inlet
  - Glacier Bay
  - Prince William Sound
- Gulf of Santa Catalina
- Salish Sea
- Gulf of California (also known as the Sea of Cortés)
- Gulf of the Farallones
- Gulf of Fonseca
- Gulf of Guayaquil
- Gulf of Nicoya
- Gulf of Panama
  - Bay of San Miguel
  - Gulf of Parita
  - Panama Bay
- Grau Sea
- San Francisco Bay
  - San Pablo Bay

==== Australia and Eurasia ====
- Australasian Mediterranean Sea
  - Arafura Sea
  - Balabac Strait
  - Bali Sea
  - Bali Strait
  - Banda Sea
  - Bangka Strait
  - Celebes Sea
    - Moro Gulf
  - Ceram Sea
  - Davao Gulf
  - Flores Sea
  - Gaspar Strait
  - Gulf of Carpentaria
  - Gulf of Thailand
    - Bandon Bay
    - Bay of Bangkok
    - Bay of Kampong Som
  - Gulf of Boni
  - Gulf of Tomini
  - Halmahera Sea
  - Java Sea
  - Karimata Strait
  - Lombok Strait
  - Madura Strait
  - Makassar Strait
  - Malacca Strait
  - Molucca Sea
  - Mindoro Strait
  - Ombai Strait
  - Philippine Inland Sea
    - Balayan Bay
    - Bohol Sea (also known as the Mindanao Sea)
    - Camotes Sea
    - Cebu Strait
    - Guimaras Strait
    - Leyte Gulf
    - Luzon Sea
    - Manila Bay
    - Ragay Gulf
    - Samar Sea
      - Carigara Bay
    - San Bernardino Strait
    - Sibuyan Sea
    - Surigao Strait
    - Tablas Strait
    - Tañon Strait
    - Tayabas Bay
    - Visayan Sea
  - Riau Strait
  - Savu Sea
  - South China Sea
    - Chao’an Bay
    - Da Nang Bay
    - Daya Bay
    - Dongshan Bay
    - Futou Bay
    - Guang’ao Bay
    - Guanghai Bay
    - Gulf of Tonkin
      - Beihai Channel
      - Ha Long Bay
      - Qinzhou Bay
    - Haimen Bay
    - Haitang Bay
    - Hiechechin Bay
    - Honghai Bay
    - Huangmao Sea
    - Jiuzhouyang
      - Deep Bay, China
      - East Lamma Channel
      - Praia Grande (Macau)
      - West Lamma Channel
    - Leizhou Bay
    - Lingayen Gulf
    - Luzon Strait
    - Mirs Bay
    - Natuna Sea
      - North Natuna Sea
    - Qiongzhou Strait
      - Haikou Bay
    - Taiwan Strait
      - Meizhou Bay
      - Penghu Channel
      - Quanzhou Bay
      - Weitou Bay
      - Xiamen Bay
      - Xinghua Bay
    - Sanya Bay
    - Sun and Moon Bay
    - West Philippine Sea
    - Yalong Bay
    - Zhanjiang Bay
    - Zhelin Bay
    - Zhenhai Bay
  - Straits of Johor
    - Singapore Strait
  - Sulu Sea
    - Panay Gulf
  - Sunda Strait
  - Timor Sea
    - Joseph Bonaparte Gulf
  - Wetar Strait
- Bass Strait
- Bay of Plenty
- Bismarck Sea
- Coral Sea
  - Gulf of Papua
  - Torres Strait
- East China Sea
  - Ariake Sea
  - Dinghai Bay
  - Fuqing Bay
  - Haitan Strait
  - Hangzhou Bay
  - Jeju Strait
  - Kagoshima Bay
  - Miyako Strait
  - Luoyuan Bay
  - Omura Bay
  - Osumi Strait
  - Tachibana Bay
  - Taizhou Bay
  - Yatsushiro Sea
  - Yellow Sea
    - Bohai Sea
      - Bohai Bay
      - Jinzhou Bay
      - Laizhou Bay
      - Liaodong Bay
    - Dalian Bay
    - Gyeonggi Bay
    - Haizhou Bay
    - Jiaozhou Bay
    - Laoshan Bay
    - Korea Bay
    - Sanggou Bay
    - Taozi Bay
  - Yueqing Bay
- Fourth Kuril Strait
- Great Australian Bight
- Hauraki Gulf
- Hawke's Bay
- Hitokappu Bay
- Koro Sea
- Kuril Strait
- Philippine Sea
  - Albay Gulf
  - Devil's/Dragon's Sea
  - Ise Bay
    - Mikawa Bay
  - Lamon Bay
  - Lagonoy Gulf
  - San Miguel Bay
  - Shibushi Bay
  - Suruga Bay
  - Sagami Bay
  - Tosa Bay
  - Tokyo Bay
    - Uraga Channel
- Poverty Bay
- Sea of Japan
  - East Korea Bay
  - Ishikari Bay
  - La Pérouse Strait
  - Mutsu Bay
  - Oki Strait
  - Peter the Great Gulf
    - Amur Bay
    - Nakhodka Bay
    - Ussuri Bay
  - Sado Strait
  - Sōya Bay
  - Strait of Tatary
  - Strait of Tsushima
  - Toyama Bay
  - Tsugaru Strait
  - Wakasa Bay
- Sea of Okhotsk
  - Aniva Bay
  - Gulf of Patience
  - Nemuro Strait
  - Shantar Sea
  - Shelikhov Gulf
  - Uda Bay
- Seto Inland Sea
  - Beppu Bay
  - Bungo Channel
    - Hoyo Strait
  - Kanmon Straits
  - Kii Channel
  - Kitan Strait
  - Naruto Strait
  - Osaka Bay
- Solomon Sea
- Spencer Gulf
- Tasman Sea
  - Sydney Harbor
- Uchiura Bay
- Vries Strait
- Waihau Bay

=== Southern Ocean ===
Southern Ocean

- Amundsen Sea
- Bellingshausen Sea
- Cooperation Sea (Note: Proposed names to the IHO 2002 draft. This draft was never approved by the IHO (or any other organization), and the 1953 IHO document (which does not contain these names which mostly originated from 1962 onward) remains currently in force. Leading geographic authorities and atlases do not use these names, including the 2014 10th edition World Atlas from the National Geographic Society and the 2014 12th edition of the Times Atlas of the World. But Soviet and Russian-issued state maps do include them.)
- Cosmonauts Sea
- Davis Sea
- D'Urville Sea
- Drake Passage
- King Haakon VII Sea
- Lazarev Sea
- Mawson Sea
- McMurdo Sound
  - Polynyas in McMurdo Sound
- Riiser-Larsen Sea
- Ross Sea
- Scotia Sea
- Somov Sea
- Spencer Gulf
- Weddell Sea
  - Weddell Polynya/Maud Rise Polynya

== Defined by ocean currents ==
While all other seas in the world are defined at least in part by land boundaries, there is only one sea which is defined only by ocean currents:

- Sargasso Sea – a sea defined by the four ocean currents which create the North Atlantic Gyre

== Not included ==
Entities called "seas" which are not divisions of the World Ocean are not included in this list. Excluded are:

- Lakes, ponds, etc.:
  - Salt lakes with "sea" in the name: Aral Sea, Dead Sea, Caspian Sea, Salton Sea
  - Freshwater lakes with "sea" in the name: Sea of Galilee
  - Bodies of water identified in lakes (bays, straits, etc.)
- Ocean gyres
- Seas in fiction, mythology, or religion

== See also ==
- Inland sea
- List of largest lakes and seas in the Solar System
- Mediterranean seas
- Oceanography
