= Char (River Island) =

River landform created by sediment deposition

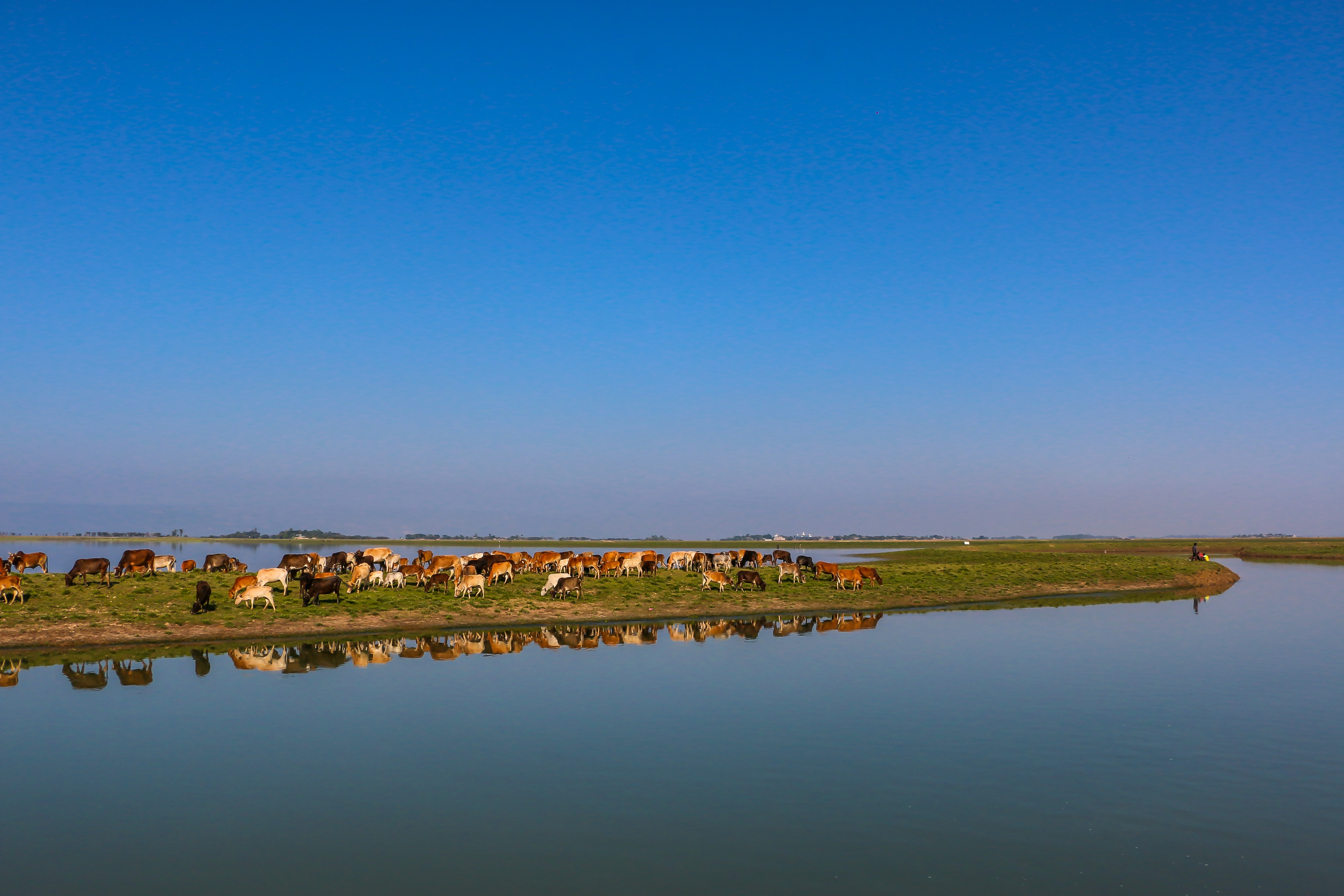
Cattle on a char, Bangladesh

A Char, also known as chora, is a dynamic landform created by sediment deposition. These land masses typically emerge as islands within river channels or along riverbanks. In Bangladesh, chars are commonly distinguished as island chars, which remain separated from the mainland by a river channel, and attached chars, which are connected to the mainland under normal river conditions. Characterized by their transient nature, chars are surrounded by water bodies such as rivers, lakes, seas, or oceansand their existence and characteristics depend largely on hydrological and sedimentary processes.

== Geology ==
=== Formation in oceans ===
The oceanic chars, often referred to as sandbars or islands, emerge as a result of the accumulation of sediment deposited by ocean currents, tides, and waves.

== See also ==
- Island
