= Carpathian Sea =

Subdivision of the Aegean Sea

Coordinates: 35°30′N 27°10′E

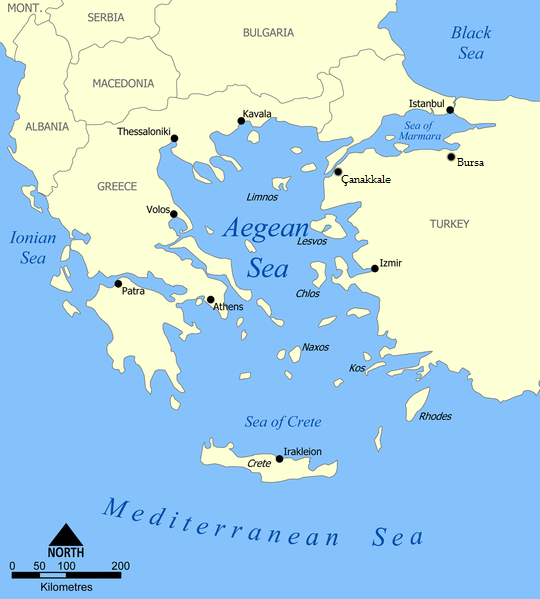
Map of the Aegean Sea, with the Carpathian Sea to the northeast of Crete

The Carpathian Sea (Greek: Καρπάθιο πέλαγος, Karkhpathio pelagos) is a traditional subdivision of the Aegean Sea, itself part of the Mediterranean Sea. It lies in the southeastern Aegean, situated between the islands of Crete, Rhodes, and Karpathos, from which it takes its name.

== Geography ==
The Carpathian Sea was described by ancient geographers as bounded by the Sea of Crete to the west and the Icarian Sea to the north. To the east it opened toward the coasts of Asia Minor and to the south into the wider Mediterranean. The islands of Karpathos, Kasos, and parts of Rhodes were regarded as lying within it.

== Classical references ==
Strabo places the Carpathian Sea adjacent to the Icarian Sea on the north and the Libyan Sea to the south, marking it as one of the named subdivisions of the Aegean.

Claudius Ptolemy also mentions the Carpathian Sea in his Geographia, situating it around Karpathos and the southeastern Aegean islands.

== Etymology ==
The sea takes its name from the island of Karpathos, which lies roughly in its center. The island itself was an important waypoint for ancient navigation between Crete and Rhodes, and the surrounding waters inherited its name.

== See also ==
- Aegean Sea
- Icarian Sea
- Sea of Crete
- Mediterranean Sea
