= Icarian Sea =

Subdivision of the Mediterranean Sea

Coordinates: 37°30′N 26°20′E

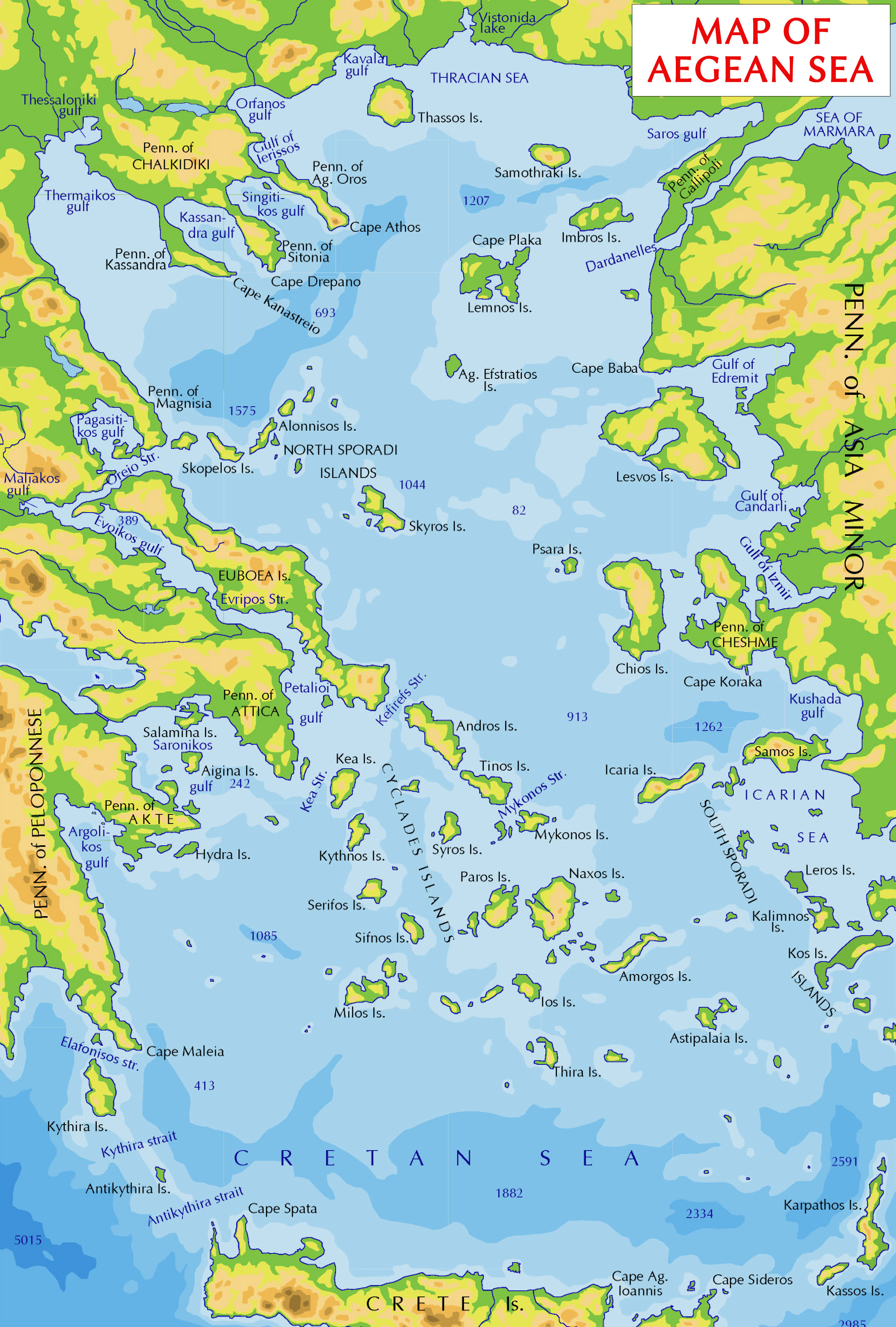
Map of the Aegean Sea. Icarian Sea is shown at its right.

The Icarian Sea (Greek: Ικάριο Πέλαγος, Ikario Pelagos) is a subdivision of the Mediterranean Sea that lies between the Cyclades and Asia Minor. It is described as the part of the Aegean Sea to the south of Chios, to the east of the Eastern Cyclades and west of Anatolia. It contains the islands of Samos, Cos, Patmos, Leros, Fournoi Korseon and Icaria.

It is the place, in the greek myth, into which Icarus made his fatal fall from the sky when he flew too close to the sun during his flight from Crete with his father Daedalus. It is either directly from this legend that it gets its name, or from the island of Icaria. According to legend, it was Helios the sun god who named the sea 'Icarian' after the fallen hero.

== Classical references ==
- Horace makes a reference to Icarian waves in Liber I, Carmen I, line 15 ("Ad Maecenatem"); the first stanza of his Ode 4.2 also alludes to the Icarian Sea.
- Strabo states that it connects with the Carpathian Sea on the south, and on the West with the Cretan Sea.
- The second epic simile of the Iliad (II.144-146) of Homer relates the Greek force to great waves on the Icarian sea.
- Herodotus mentions Icarian Sea in The Histories VI:95 in reference to Persian troop movements.
