= Aegean Sea =

Mediterranean between Greece and Turkey

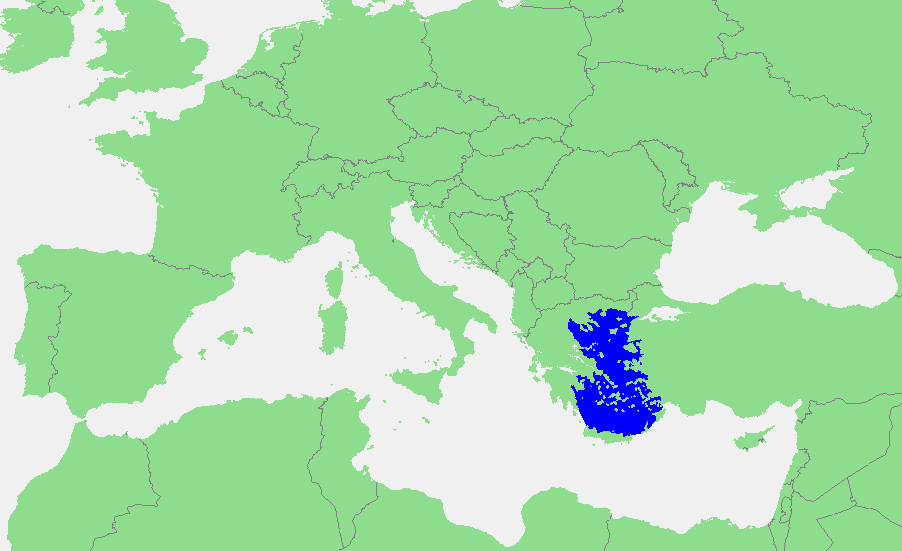
- The location of the Aegean Sea

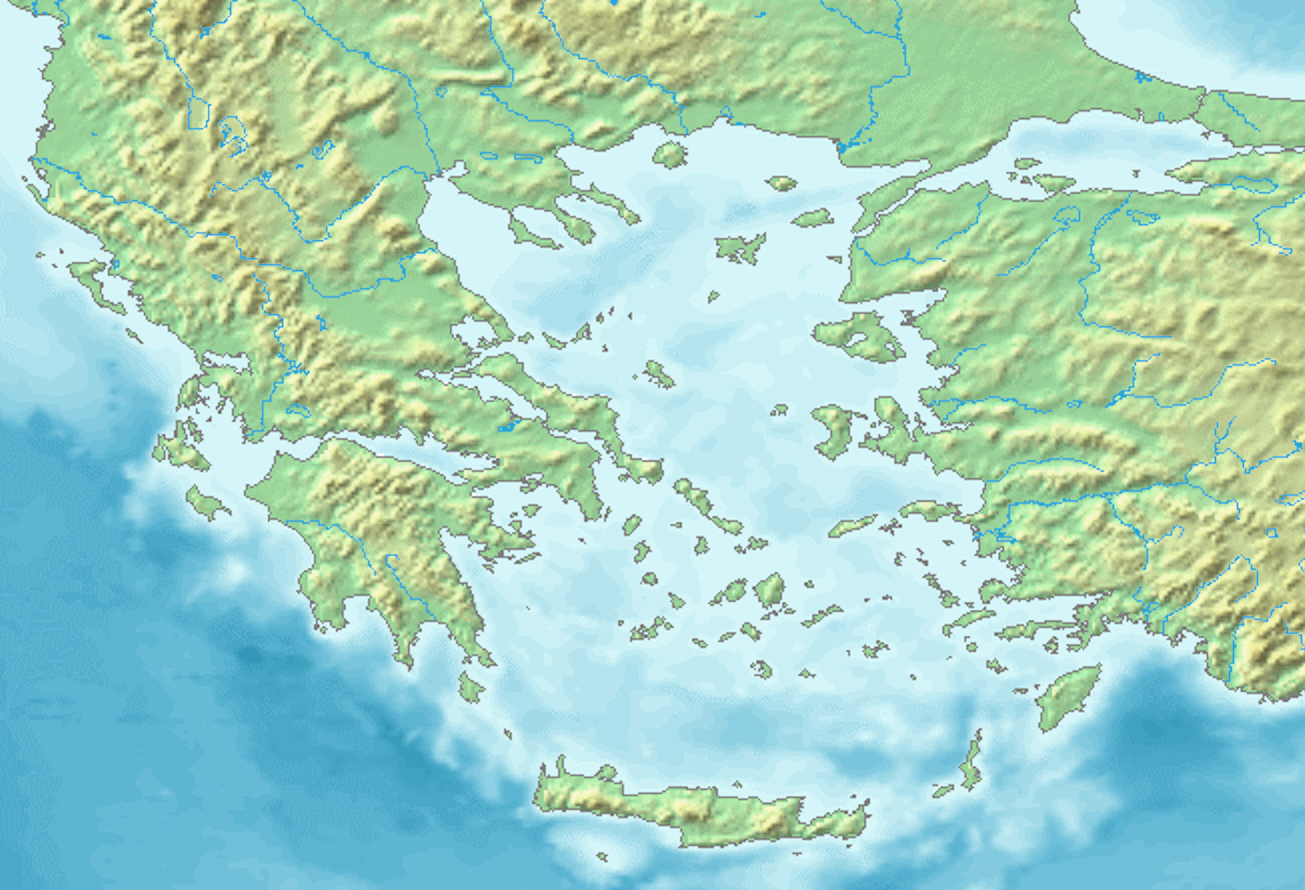
- Location within the Eastern Mediterranean
- Location: Northeastern Mediterranean Sea
- Coordinates: 39°N 25°E
- Type: Sea
- Etymology: From Greek mythological character Aegeus
- Primary inflows: Inachos, Ilisos, Spercheios, Pineios, Haliacmon, Vardar, Struma, Nestos, Maritsa
- Primary outflows: Mediterranean Sea
- Basin countries: Greece, Turkey; Bulgaria, North Macedonia, Serbia (drainage basins for inflow rivers)
- Max. length: 700 km (430 mi)
- Max. width: 400 km (250 mi)
- Surface area: 214,000 km^{2} (83,000 sq mi)
- Max. depth: 2,639 m (8,658 feet)
- Islands: 150+
- Settlements: Alexandroupolis, Athens, Ayvalık, Bodrum, Çanakkale, Çeşme, Chania, Didim, Heraklion, İzmir, Kavala, Kuşadası, Nafplio, Thessaloniki, Volos

The Aegean Sea (Note: /iˈdʒiːən/, ee-JEE-ən; Greek: Αιγαίο Πέλαγος, romanized: Eyéo Pélagos [eˈʝeo ˈpelaɣos]; Turkish: Ege Denizi [eˈɟe deniˈzi]) is an elongated embayment of the Mediterranean Sea between Europe and Asia. It is located between the Balkans and Anatolia, and covers an area of some 215,000 km^{2} (83,000 sq mi). In the north, the Aegean is connected to the Marmara Sea, which in turn connects to the Black Sea, by the straits of the Dardanelles and the Bosphorus, respectively. The Aegean Islands are located within the sea and some bound it on its southern periphery, including Crete and Rhodes. The sea reaches a maximum depth of 2,639 m (8,658 ft) to the west of Karpathos. The Thracian Sea and the Sea of Crete are main subdivisions of the Aegean Sea.

The Aegean Islands can be divided into several island groups, including the Dodecanese, the Cyclades, the Sporades, the Saronic islands and the North Aegean Islands, as well as Crete and its surrounding islands. The Dodecanese, located to the southeast, includes the islands of Rhodes, Kos, and Patmos; the islands of Delos and Naxos are within the Cyclades to the south of the sea. Lesbos is part of the North Aegean Islands. Euboea, the second-largest island in Greece, is located in the Aegean, despite being administered as part of Central Greece. Nine out of twelve of the Administrative regions of Greece border the sea, along with the Turkish provinces of Edirne, Çanakkale, Balıkesir, İzmir, Aydın and Muğla to the east of the sea. Various Turkish islands in the sea are Imbros, Tenedos, Cunda Island, and the Foça Islands.

The Aegean Sea has been historically important, especially regarding the civilization of Ancient Greece, which inhabited the area around the coast of the Aegean and the Aegean islands. The Aegean islands facilitated contact between the people of the area and between Europe and Asia. Along with the Greeks, Thracians lived along the northern coasts. The Romans conquered the area under the Roman Empire, and later the Byzantine Empire held it against advances by the First Bulgarian Empire. The Fourth Crusade weakened Byzantine control of the area, and it was eventually conquered by the Ottoman Empire, with the exception of Crete, which was a Venetian colony until 1669. The Greek War of Independence allowed a Greek state on the coast of the Aegean from 1829 onwards. The Ottoman Empire held a presence over the sea for over 500 years until it was replaced by modern Turkey.

The rocks making up the floor of the Aegean are mainly limestone, though often greatly altered by volcanic activity that has convulsed the region in relatively recent geologic times. Of particular interest are the richly colored sediments in the region of the islands of Santorini and Milos, in the south Aegean. Notable cities on the Aegean coastline include Athens, Thessaloniki, Heraklion, Volos, Alexandroupolis and Kavala in Greece, and İzmir and Bodrum in Turkey.

Several issues concerning sovereignty within the Aegean Sea are disputed between Greece and Turkey. The Aegean dispute has had a large effect on Greece–Turkey relations since the 1970s. Issues include the delimitation of territorial waters, national airspace, exclusive economic zones, and flight information regions.

== Name and etymology ==
The origin of the name Αἰγαῖον πέλαγος (neuter) or Αἰγαῖος πόντος (masculine) has been explained by ancient grammarians through various theories:

Figure-Based Origins

- Aegeus, the father of Theseus, who is said to have drowned himself in the sea. According to the story, Aegeus instructed Theseus to raise white sails if he succeeded in killing the Minotaur, when Theseus forgot to do so, Aegeus believed his son had died and leapt into the sea.
- Aegaea, an Amazon queen who was said to have perished there.
- Aegaeon, a sea deity.
- Poseidon, known by the epithet "Aigaios".
- Ruler Aigaion. Stephanus of Byzantium wrote that one of the legends is that Karystos was formerly called Aigaia, after the ruler Aigaion, who also lent his name to the Aegean Sea.
- The Mysian hero Aigaion.
- Giant Briareus, also called Aigaion.
- Briareus, a primeval thalassocrat, also known as Aigaion.

Place-Based Origins

- An island called "Goat island" (Aἰγῶν). This island was a sacred place dedicated to Poseidon. Legend has it that no one sleeps there because the god himself appears on the island.
- A rock, rather than an island, shaped like a goat, called Aex (αἲξ, "a goat"), reputed to have given its name to the sea.
- A place called Aix in the area of Canai, within Aeolia.
- Several islands or cities were named Aigai/Aigaia, some authors traced the origin of the sea's name to them, many closely associated with Poseidon.

Linguistic and Interpretive-Based Origins

- From αἐί γαῖα, meaning "because the land is always in sight".
- From αἰγίς, meaning a violent squall, referring to the sea's stormy nature.
- From αἶγες ("goats"), because the many islands looked like a herd of goats rising from the water.
- Because its waves resembled goats.
- The metaphorical use of αἶγες (aiges; "goats") for large, violent waves, as noted by the Suda, suggesting a link between the sea's name and its fearsome character.

Ancient Greek authors also called it the "Greek Sea".

The sea was known in Latin as Mare Aegaeum while under the control of the Roman Empire. Pliny the Elder write that the Romans used the terms "Macedonian" for the northern part near Macedonia and Thrace provinces, and "Grecian" for the part near Greece itself.

In medieval Latin, the Aegean Sea was known as Egeopelagus, a form attested as late as 1419 in Venetian state papers (Ducatus Egeopelagi) and derived from the Greek αἰγαιοπέλαγος / αἰγαῖον πέλαγος. The term Arcipelago also appears, for instance in a treaty on 30 June 1268 between the Venetians and the emperor Michael Palaeologus.

This term subsequently gave rise to Archipelago (Greek: αρχιπέλαγος), which in many European languages originally referred specifically to the Aegean Sea. The terms Greek Archipelago or Grecian Archipelago were also used. Later, as archipelago came to be used increasingly as a generic term for island-studded seas, the terms Greek Archipelago or Grecian Archipelago continued to be used alongside the ancient name, Aegean Sea.

In some South Slavic languages, the Aegean is called White Sea (Bulgarian: Бяло море, romanized: Byalo more; Macedonian: Бело море, romanized: Belo more; Serbian: Belo more / Бело море).

The Turkish name for the sea is Ege Denizi, which is derived from the Greek name, and Adalar Denizi meaning "Sea of Islands". In the past, Turks also referred to it as the "White Sea", to differentiate it from the Black Sea.

== Geography ==
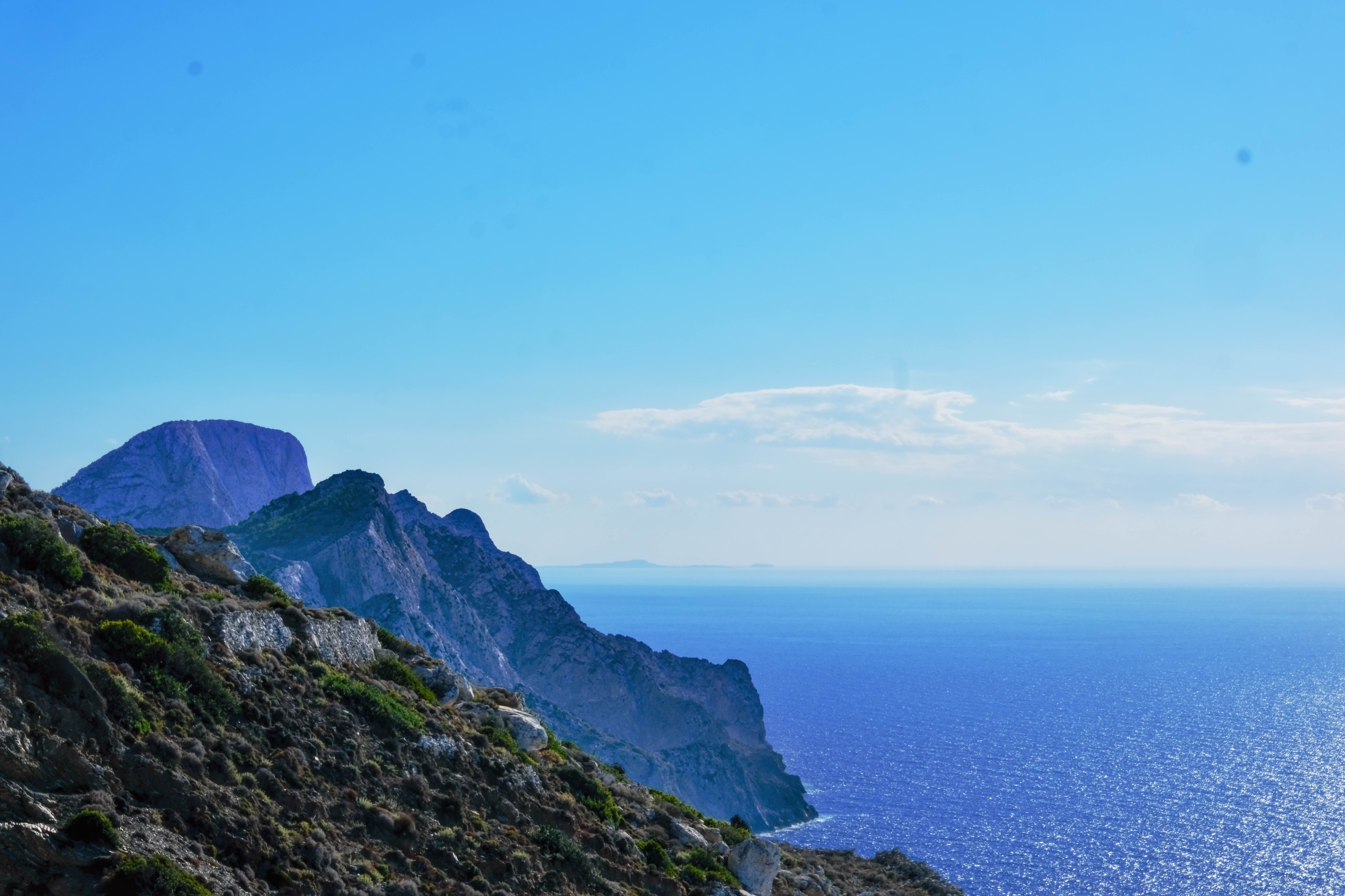
Karpathos mountains meets the Aegean sea

The Aegean Sea is an elongated embayment of the Mediterranean Sea and covers about 214,000 square kilometres (83,000 sq mi) in area, measuring about 670 kilometres (420 mi) longitudinally and 390 kilometres (240 mi) latitudinal. The sea's maximum depth is 2,639 metres (8,658 ft), located at a point west of Karpathos. The Aegean Islands are found within its waters, with the following islands delimiting the sea on the south, generally from west to east: Kythera, Antikythera, Crete, Kasos, Karpathos and Rhodes. The Anatolian peninsula marks the eastern boundary of the sea, while the Greek mainland marks the west. Several seas are contained within the Aegean Sea; the Thracian Sea is a section of the Aegean located to the north, the Icarian Sea to the east, the Myrtoan Sea to the west, while the Sea of Crete is the southern section.

The Greek regions that border the sea, in alphabetical order, are Attica, Central Greece, Central Macedonia, Crete, Eastern Macedonia and Thrace, North Aegean, Peloponnese, South Aegean, and Thessaly. The traditional Greek region of Macedonia also borders the sea, to the north.

The Aegean Islands, which almost all belong to Greece, can be divided into seven groups:

1. Northeastern Aegean Islands, which lie in the Thracian Sea
2. East Aegean Islands (Euboea)
3. Northern Sporades
4. Cyclades
5. Saronic Islands (or Argo-Saronic Islands)
6. Dodecanese (or Southern Sporades)
7. Crete

Many of the Aegean islands or island chains, are geographical extensions of the mountains on the mainland. One chain extends across the sea to Chios, another extends across Euboea to Samos, and a third extends across the Peloponnese and Crete to Rhodes, dividing the Aegean from the Mediterranean.

The bays and gulfs of the Aegean beginning at the South and moving clockwise include on Crete, the Mirabello, Almyros, Souda and Chania bays or gulfs, on the mainland the Myrtoan Sea to the west with the Argolic Gulf, the Saronic Gulf northwestward, the Petalies Gulf which connects with the South Euboic Sea, the Pagasetic Gulf which connects with the North Euboic Sea, the Thermian Gulf northwestward, the Chalkidiki Peninsula including the Cassandra and the Singitic Gulfs, northward the Strymonian Gulf and the Gulf of Kavala and the rest are in Turkey; Saros Gulf, Edremit Gulf, Dikili Gulf, Gulf of Çandarlı, Gulf of İzmir, Gulf of Kuşadası, Gulf of Gökova, Güllük Gulf.

The Aegean Sea is connected to the Sea of Marmara by the Dardanelles, also known from Classical Antiquity as the Hellespont. The Dardanelles are located to the northeast of the sea. It ultimately connects with the Black Sea through the Bosporus strait, upon which lies the city of Istanbul. The Dardanelles and the Bosporus are known as the Turkish Straits.

=== Extent ===
According to the International Hydrographic Organization, the limits of the Aegean Sea as follows:

- On the south: A line running from Cape Aspro (28°16′E) in Asia Minor, to Cum Burnù (Capo della Sabbia) the Northeast extreme of the Island of Rhodes, through the island to Cape Prasonisi, the Southwest point thereof, on to Vrontos Point (35°33′N) in Skarpanto [Karpathos], through this island to Castello Point, the South extreme thereof, across to Cape Plaka (East extremity of Crete), through Crete to Agria Grabusa, the Northwest extreme thereof, thence to Cape Apolytares in Antikythera Island, through the island to Psira Rock (off the Northwest point) and across to Cape Trakhili in Kythira Island, through Kythira to the Northwest point (Cape Karavugia) and thence to Cape Santa Maria (36°28′N 22°57′E) in the Morea.
- In the Dardanelles: A line joining Kum Kale (26°11′E) and Cape Helles.

=== Hydrography ===
Aegean surface water circulates in a counterclockwise gyre, with hypersaline Mediterranean water moving northward along the west coast of Turkey, before being displaced by less dense Black Sea outflow. The dense Mediterranean water sinks below the Black Sea inflow to a depth of 23–30 metres (75–98 ft), then flows through the Dardanelles Strait and into the Sea of Marmara at velocities of 5–15 cm/s (2–6 in/s). The Black Sea outflow moves westward along the northern Aegean Sea, then flows southwards along the east coast of Greece.

The physical oceanography of the Aegean Sea is controlled mainly by the regional climate, the fresh water discharge from major rivers draining southeastern Europe, and the seasonal variations in the Black Sea surface water outflow through the Dardanelles Strait.

Analysis of the Aegean during 1991 and 1992 revealed three distinct water masses:

- Aegean Sea Surface Water – 40–50 metres (130–160 ft) thick veneer, with summer temperatures of 19–24 °C and winter temperatures ranging from 8 °C (46 °F) in the north to 13 °C (55 °F) in the very south.
- Aegean Sea Intermediate Water – Aegean Sea Intermediate Water extends from 40–50 m (130–160 ft) to 200–300 m (660–980 ft) with temperatures ranging from 11–18 °C (52–64 °F).
- Aegean Sea Bottom Water – occurring at depths below 500–1,000 m (1,600–3,300 ft) with a very uniform temperature (13–14 °C (55–57 °F)) and salinity (3.91–3.92%).

=== Climate ===
Climate map of Greece. Most of the landmass surrounding the Aegean Sea is classified as Csa, with the northern region being BSk.

The climate of the Aegean Sea largely reflects the climate of Greece and Western Turkey, which is to say, predominantly Mediterranean. According to the Köppen climate classification, most of the Aegean is classified as Hot-summer Mediterranean (Csa), with hotter and drier summers along with milder and wetter winters. However, high temperatures during summers are generally not quite as high as those in arid or semiarid climates due to the presence of a large body of water. This is most predominant in the west and east coasts of the Aegean, and within the Aegean islands. In the north of the Aegean Sea, the climate is instead classified as Cold semi-arid (BSk), which feature cooler summers than Hot-summer Mediterranean climates. The Etesian winds are a dominant weather influence in the Aegean Basin.

The below table lists climate conditions of some major Aegean cities:

Climate characteristics of some major cities on the Aegean coast
City	Mean temperature (daily high)				Mean total rainfall					
City	January		July		January			July		
City	°C	°F	°C	°F	mm	in	days	mm	in	days
Alexandroupolis	8.4	47.1	30.1	86.2	60.4	2.38	6.8	17.6	0.69	2.5
Bodrum	15.1	59.2	34.2	93.6	134.1	5.28	12.3	1.3	0.05	1.5
Heraklion	15.2	59.4	28.6	83.5	91.5	3.6	10.1	1.0	0.04	0.1
İzmir	12.4	54.3	33.2	91.8	132.7	5.22	12.6	1.7	0.07	0.4
Thessaloniki	9.3	48.7	32.5	90.5	35.2	1.39	8.8	27.3	1.07	3.8
Source: World Meteorological Organization, Turkish State Meteorological Service

=== Population ===
Numerous Greek and Turkish settlements are located along their mainland coast, as well as on towns on the Aegean islands. The largest cities are Athens and Thessaloniki in Greece and İzmir in Turkey. The most populated of the Aegean islands is Crete, followed by Euboea and Rhodes.

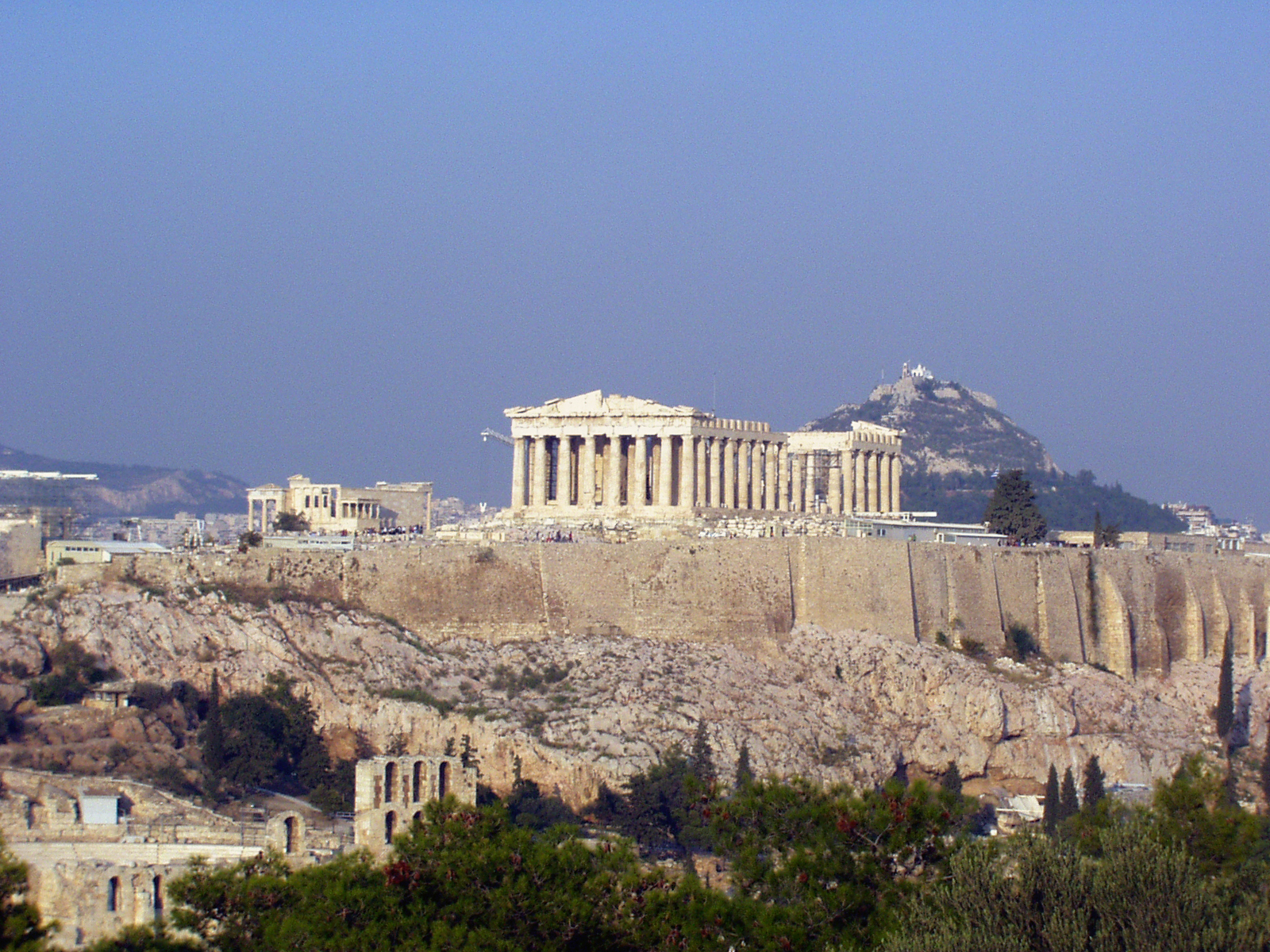
Athens

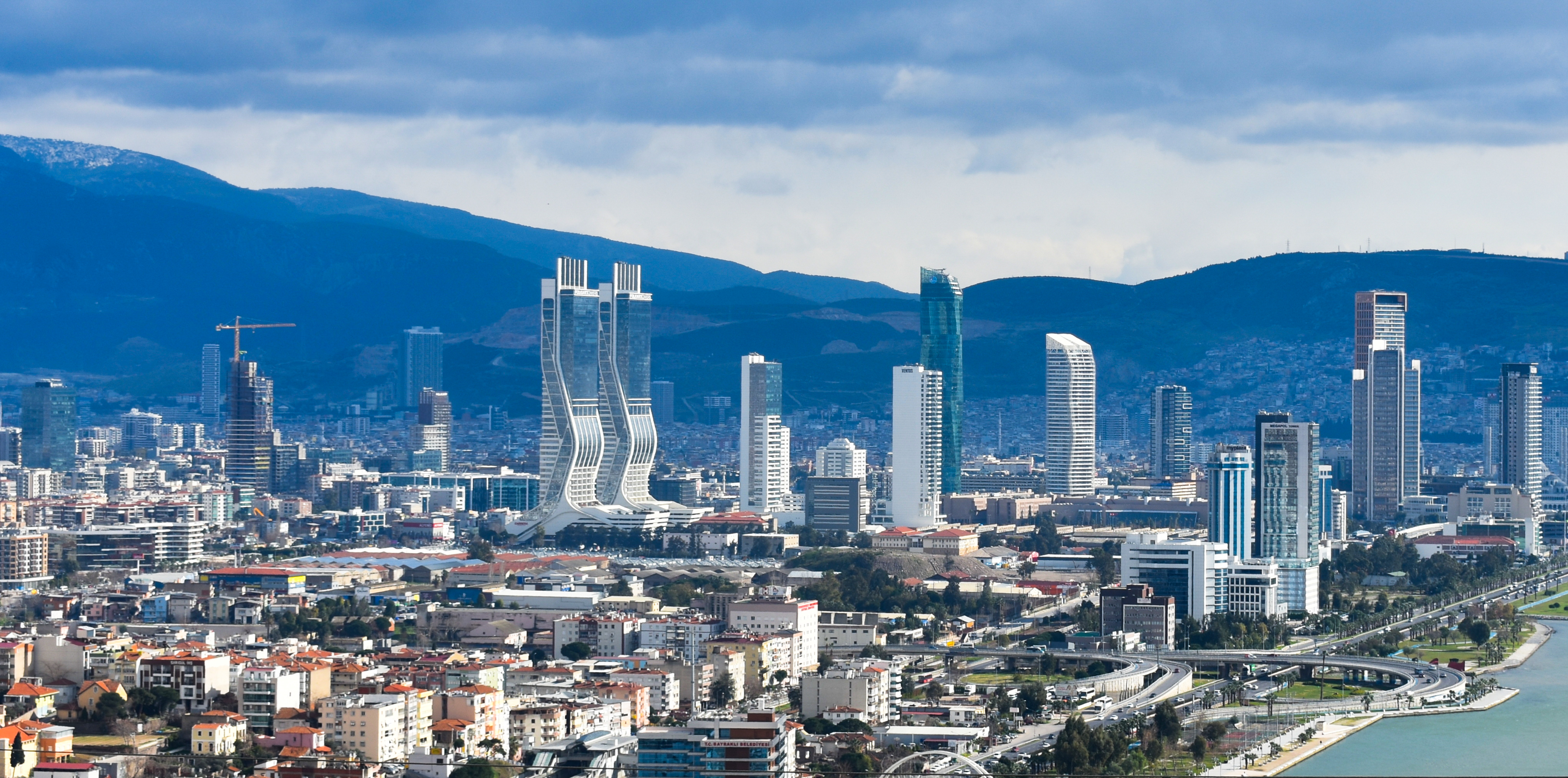
İzmir

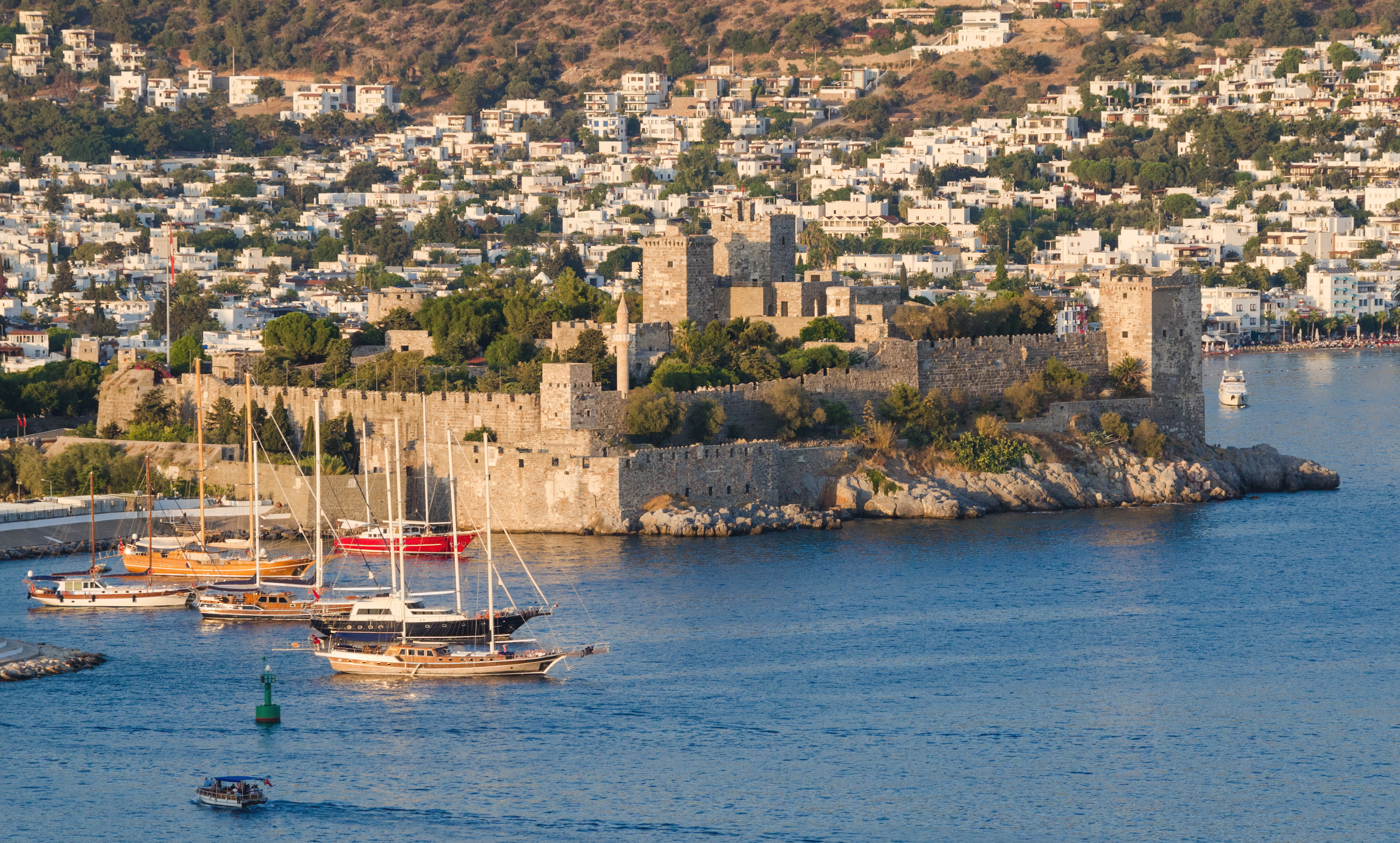
Bodrum

Most populous urban areas on the Aegean coast
Rank	City	Country	Region/County	Population (urban)
1	Athens	Greece	Central Greece	3,090,508
2	İzmir	Turkey	İzmir Province	2,948,609
3	Thessaloniki	Greece	Macedonia	824,676
4	Bodrum	Turkey	Muğla Province	198,335
5	Çanakkale	Turkey	Çanakkale Province	182,389
6	Heraklion	Greece	Crete	173,993
7	Volos	Greece	Thessaly	144,449
8	Kuşadası	Turkey	Aydın Province	133,177
9	Chania	Greece	Crete	108,642
10	Didim	Turkey	Aydın Province	100,189

== Biogeography and ecology ==
=== Protected areas ===
Greece has established several marine protected areas along its coasts. According to the Network of Managers of Marine Protected Areas in the Mediterranean (MedPAN), four Greek MPAs are participating in the Network. These include Alonnisos Marine Park, while the Missolonghi–Aitoliko Lagoons and the island of Zakynthos are not on the Aegean.

== History ==
=== Ancient history ===
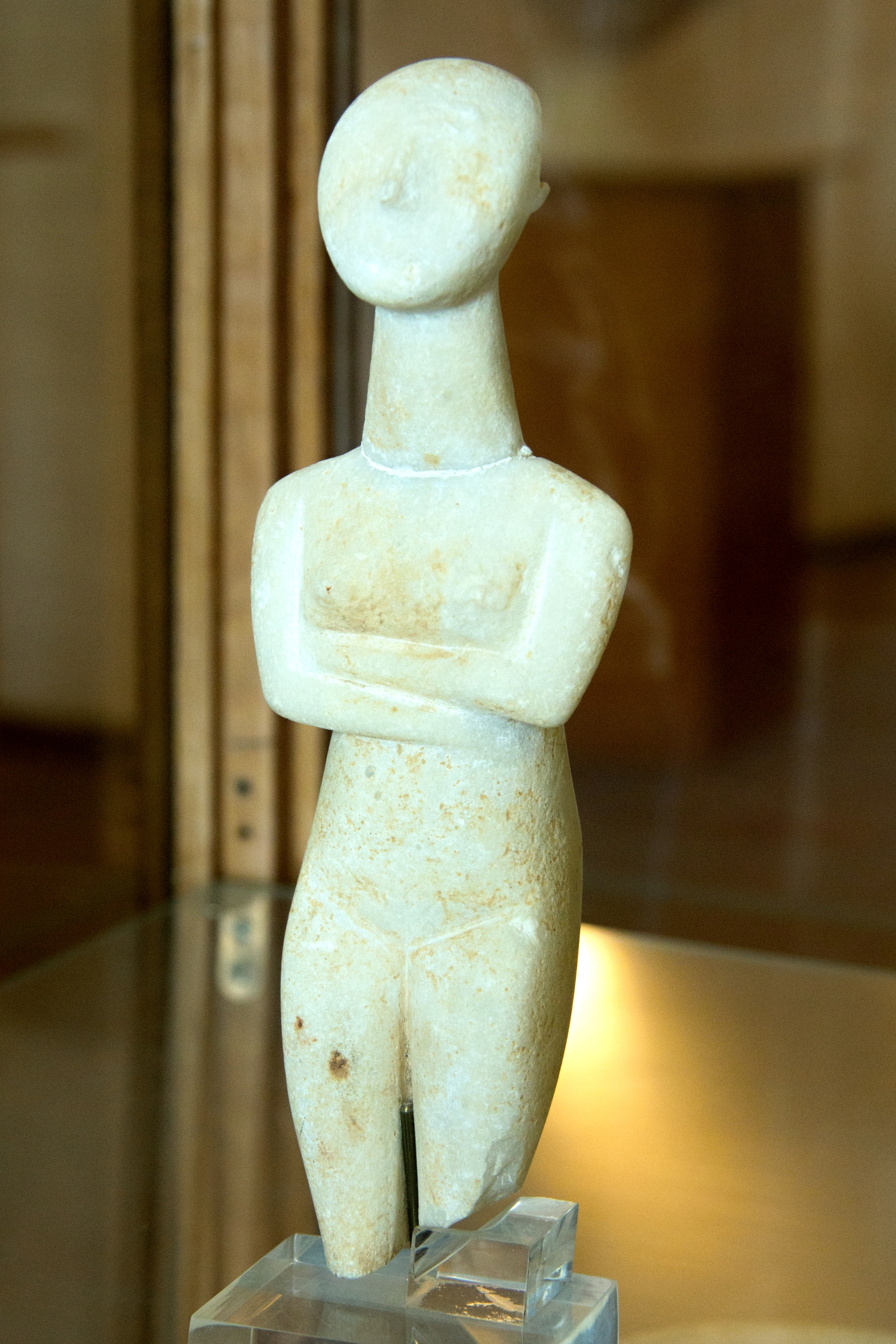
Female figure from Naxos (2800–2300 BC)

The current coastline dates back to about 4000 BC. Before that time, at the peak of the last ice age (about 18,000 years ago) sea levels everywhere were 130 metres (430 ft) lower, and there were large well-watered coastal plains instead of much of the northern Aegean. When they were first occupied, the present-day islands including Milos with its important obsidian production were probably still connected to the mainland. The present coastal arrangement appeared around 9,000 years ago, with post-ice age sea levels continuing to rise for another 3,000 years after that.

The subsequent Bronze Age civilizations of Greece and the Aegean Sea have given rise to the general term Aegean civilization. In ancient times, the sea was the birthplace of two ancient civilizations – the Minoans of Crete and the Mycenaeans of the Peloponnese.

The Minoan civilization was a Bronze Age civilization on the island of Crete and other Aegean islands, flourishing from around 3000 to 1450 BC before a period of decline, finally ending at around 1100 BC. It represented the first advanced civilization in Europe, leaving behind massive building complexes, tools, stunning artwork, writing systems, and a massive network of trade. The Minoan period saw extensive trade between Crete, Aegean, and Mediterranean settlements, particularly the Near East. The most notable Minoan palace is that of Knossos, followed by that of Phaistos. The Mycenaean Greeks arose on the mainland, becoming the first advanced civilization in mainland Greece, which lasted from approximately 1600 to 1100 BC. It is believed that the site of Mycenae, which sits close to the Aegean coast, was the center of Mycenaean civilization. The Mycenaeans introduced several innovations in the fields of engineering, architecture and military infrastructure, while trade over vast areas of the Mediterranean, including the Aegean, was essential for the Mycenaean economy. Their syllabic script, the Linear B, offers the first written records of the Greek language and their religion already included several deities that can also be found in the Olympic Pantheon. Mycenaean Greece was dominated by a warrior elite society and consisted of a network of palace-centered states that developed rigid hierarchical, political, social and economic systems. At the head of this society was the king, known as wanax.

The civilization of Mycenaean Greeks perished with the collapse of Bronze Age culture in the eastern Mediterranean, to be followed by the so-called Greek Dark Ages. It is undetermined what cause the collapse of the Mycenaeans. During the Greek Dark Ages, writing in the Linear B script ceased, vital trade links were lost, and towns and villages were abandoned.

=== Ancient Greece ===
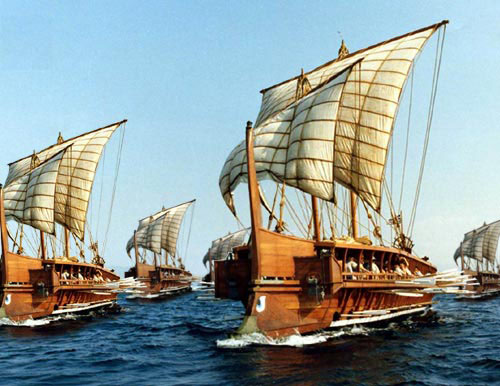
A fleet of Athenian trireme

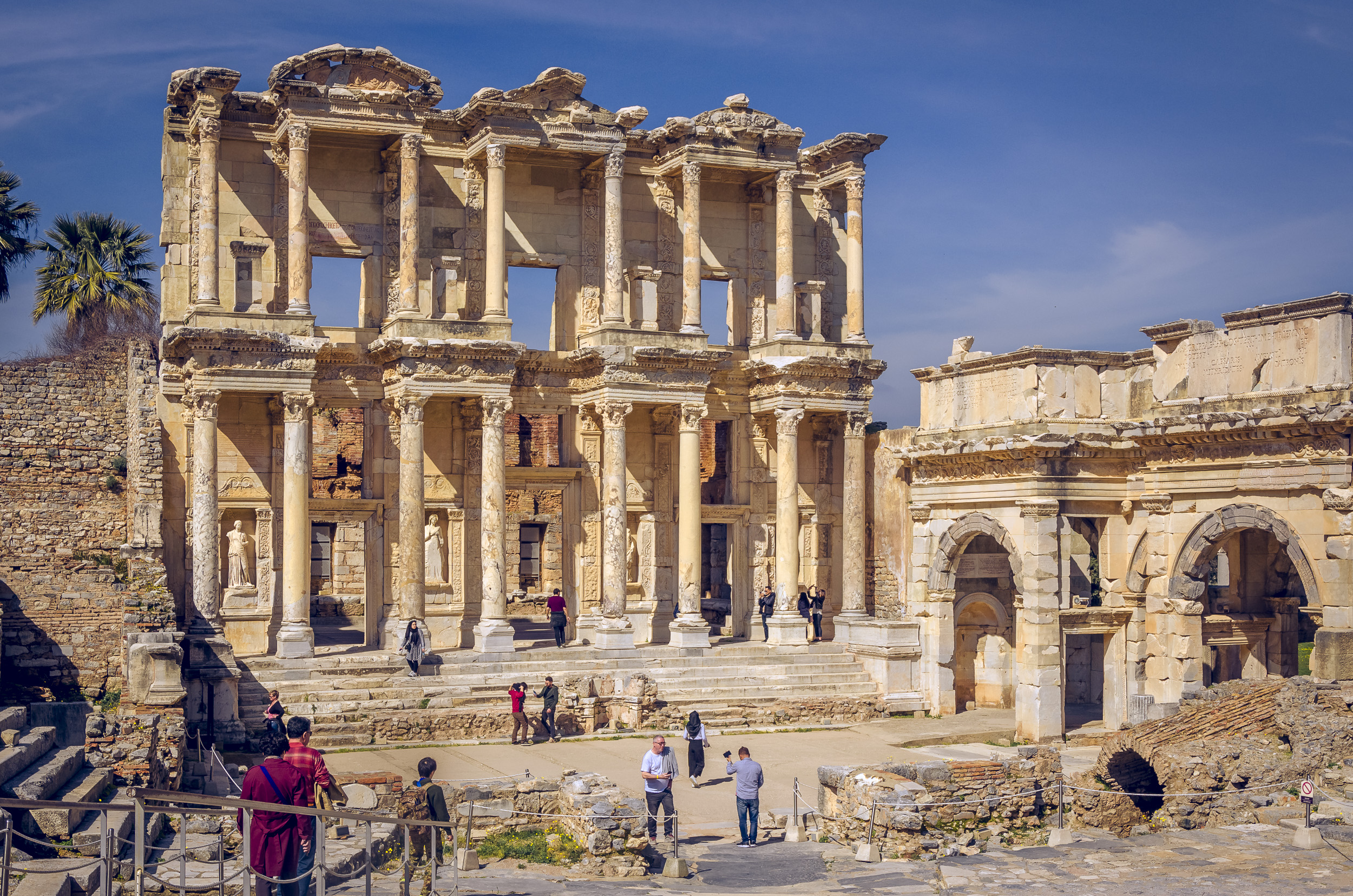
Library of Celsus, a Roman structure in important sea port Ephesus

The Archaic period followed the Greek Dark Ages in the 8th century BC. Greece became divided into small self-governing communities, and adopted the Phoenician alphabet, modifying it to create the Greek alphabet. By the 6th century BC several cities had emerged as dominant in Greek affairs: Athens, Sparta, Corinth, and Thebes, of which Athens, Sparta, and Corinth were closest to the Aegean Sea. Each of them had brought the surrounding rural areas and smaller towns under their control, and Athens and Corinth had become major maritime and mercantile powers as well. In the 8th and 7th centuries BC many Greeks migrated to form colonies in Magna Graecia (Southern Italy and Sicily), Asia Minor and further afield. The Aegean Sea was the setting for one of the most pivotal naval engagements in history, when, on 20 September 480 B.C., the Athenian fleet gained a decisive victory over the Persian fleet of the Xerxes II of Persia at the Battle of Salamis. Thus ending any further attempt of western expansion by the Achaemenid Empire.

The Aegean Sea would later come to be under the control, albeit briefly, of the Kingdom of Macedonia. Philip II and his son Alexander the Great led a series of conquests that led not only to the unification of the Greek mainland and the control of the Aegean Sea under his rule, but also the destruction of the Achaemenid Empire. After Alexander the Great's death, his empire was divided among his generals. Cassander became king of the Hellenistic kingdom of Macedon, which held territory along the western coast of the Aegean, roughly corresponding to modern-day Greece. The Kingdom of Lysimachus had control over the sea's eastern coast. Greece had entered the Hellenistic period.

=== Roman rule ===
The Macedonian Wars were a series of conflicts fought by the Roman Republic and its Greek allies in the eastern Mediterranean against several different major Greek kingdoms. They resulted in Roman control or influence over the eastern Mediterranean basin, including the Aegean, in addition to their hegemony in the western Mediterranean after the Punic Wars. During Roman rule, the land around the Aegean Sea fell under the provinces of Achaea, Macedonia, Thracia, Asia and Creta et Cyrenaica (island of Crete).

=== Medieval period ===
Emirate of Crete, after early conquest of Arabs

The fall of the Western Roman Empire allowed its successor state, the Byzantine Empire, to continue Roman control over the Aegean Sea. However, their territory would later be threatened by the early Muslim conquests initiated by Muhammad in the 7th century. Although the Rashidun Caliphate did not manage to obtain land along the coast of the Aegean Sea, its conquest of the Eastern Anatolian peninsula as well as Egypt, the Levant, and North Africa left the Byzantine Empire weakened. The Umayyad Caliphate expanded the territorial gains of the Rashidun Caliphate, conquering much of North Africa, and threatened the Byzantine Empire's control of Western Anatolia, where it meets the Aegean Sea.

During the 820s, Crete was conquered by a group of Berbers Andalusians exiles led by Abu Hafs Umar al-Iqritishi, and it became an independent Islamic state. The Byzantine Empire launched a campaign that took most of the island back in 842 and 843 under Theoktistos, but the re-conquest was not completed and was soon reversed. Later attempts by the Byzantine Empire to recover the island were without success. For the approximately 135 years of its existence, the emirate of Crete was one of the major foes of Byzantium. Crete commanded the sea lanes of the Eastern Mediterranean and functioned as a forward base and haven for Muslim corsair fleets that ravaged the Byzantine-controlled shores of the Aegean Sea. Crete returned to Byzantine rule under Nikephoros II Phokas, who launched a huge campaign against the Emirate of Crete in 960 to 961.

Meanwhile, the Bulgarian Empire threatened Byzantine control of Northern Greece and the Aegean coast to the south. Under Presian and his successor Boris I, the Bulgarian Empire managed to obtain a small portion of the northern Aegean coast. Simeon I of Bulgaria led Bulgaria to its greatest territorial expansion, and managed to conqueror much of the northern and western coasts of the Aegean. The Byzantines later regained control. The Second Bulgarian Empire achieved similar success along, again, the northern and western coasts, under Ivan Asen II of Bulgaria.

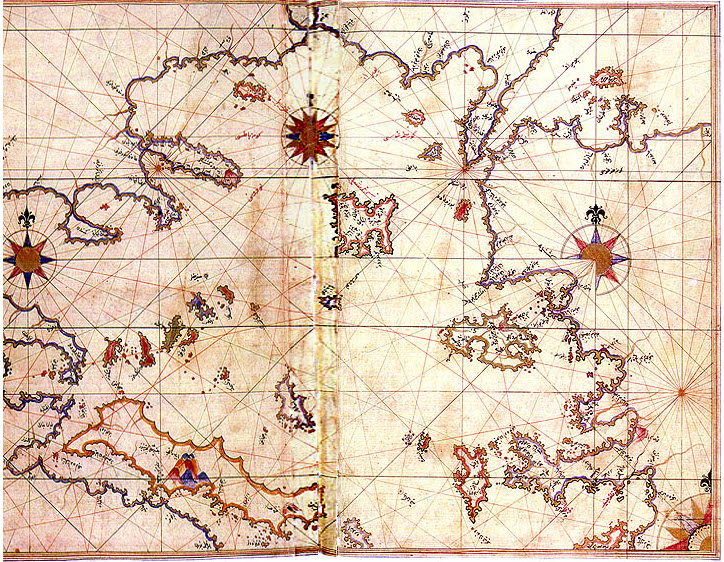
A 1528 map of the Aegean Sea by Turkish geographer Piri Reis

The Seljuk Turks, under the Seljuk Empire, invaded the Byzantine Empire in 1068, from which they annexed almost all the territories of Anatolia, including the east coast of the Aegean Sea, during the reign of Alp Arslan, the second Sultan of the Seljuk Empire. After the death of his successor, Malik Shah I, the empire was divided, and Malik Shah was succeeded in Anatolia by Kilij Arslan I, who founded the Sultanate of Rum. The Byzantines yet again recaptured the eastern coast of the Aegean.

After Constantinople was occupied by Western European and Venetian forces during the Fourth Crusade, the area around the Aegean Sea was fragmented into multiple entities, including the Latin Empire, the Kingdom of Thessalonica, the Empire of Nicaea, the Principality of Achaea, and the Duchy of Athens. The Venetians created the maritime state of the Duchy of the Archipelago, which included all the Cyclades except Mykonos and Tinos. The Empire of Nicaea, a Byzantine rump state, managed to affect the Recapture of Constantinople from the Latins in 1261 and defeat Epirus. Byzantine successes were not to last; the Ottomans would conquer the area around the Aegean coast, but before their expansion the Byzantine Empire had already been weakened from internal conflict. By the late 14th century, the Byzantine Empire had lost all control of the coast of the Aegean Sea and could only exercise power around their capital, Constantinople. The Ottoman Empire then gained control of all the Aegean coast with the exception of Crete, which was a Venetian colony until 1669.

=== Modern period ===
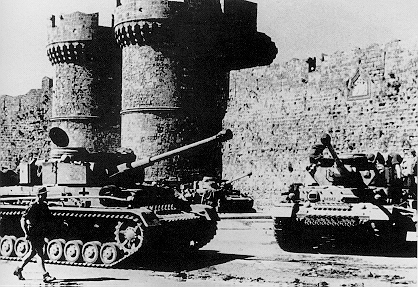
German tanks in Rhodes during World War II

The Greek War of Independence allowed a Greek state on the coast of the Aegean from 1829 onward. In the aftermath of the Balkan Wars (1912–1913) Greece expanded northwards along the coast, while Bulgaria gained access in the northernmost section of the sea. The Ottoman Empire held a presence over the sea for over 500 years until its dissolution following World War I, when it was replaced by modern Turkey. After the war, Greece gained control over the area around the northern coast of the Aegean, including the territory held by Bulgaria. By the 1920s, Greece and Turkey had about resumed their present-day borders.

In the Italo-Turkish War of 1912, Italy captured the Dodecanese islands, and had occupied them since, reneging on the 1919 Venizelos–Tittoni agreement to cede them to Greece. The Greco-Italian War took place from October 1940 to April 1941 as part of the Balkans Campaign of World War II. The Italian war aim was to establish a Greek puppet state, which would permit the Italian annexation of the Sporades and Cyclades islands in the Aegean Sea, to be administered as a part of the Italian Aegean Islands. The German invasion resulted in the Axis occupation of Greece. The German troops evacuated Athens on 12 October 1944, and by the end of the month, they had withdrawn from mainland Greece. Greece was then liberated by Allied troops.

== Economy and politics ==
Many of the islands in the Aegean have safe harbours and bays. In ancient times, navigation through the sea was easier than travelling across the rough terrain of the Greek mainland, and to some extent, the coastal areas of Anatolia. Many of the islands are volcanic, and marble and iron are mined on other islands. The larger islands have some fertile valleys and plains.

Of the main islands in the Aegean Sea, two belong to Turkey – Bozcaada (Tenedos) and Gökçeada (Imbros); the rest belong to Greece. Between the two countries, there are political disputes over several aspects of political control over the Aegean space, including the size of territorial waters, air control and the delimitation of economic rights to the continental shelf. These issues are known as the Aegean dispute.

=== Transport ===
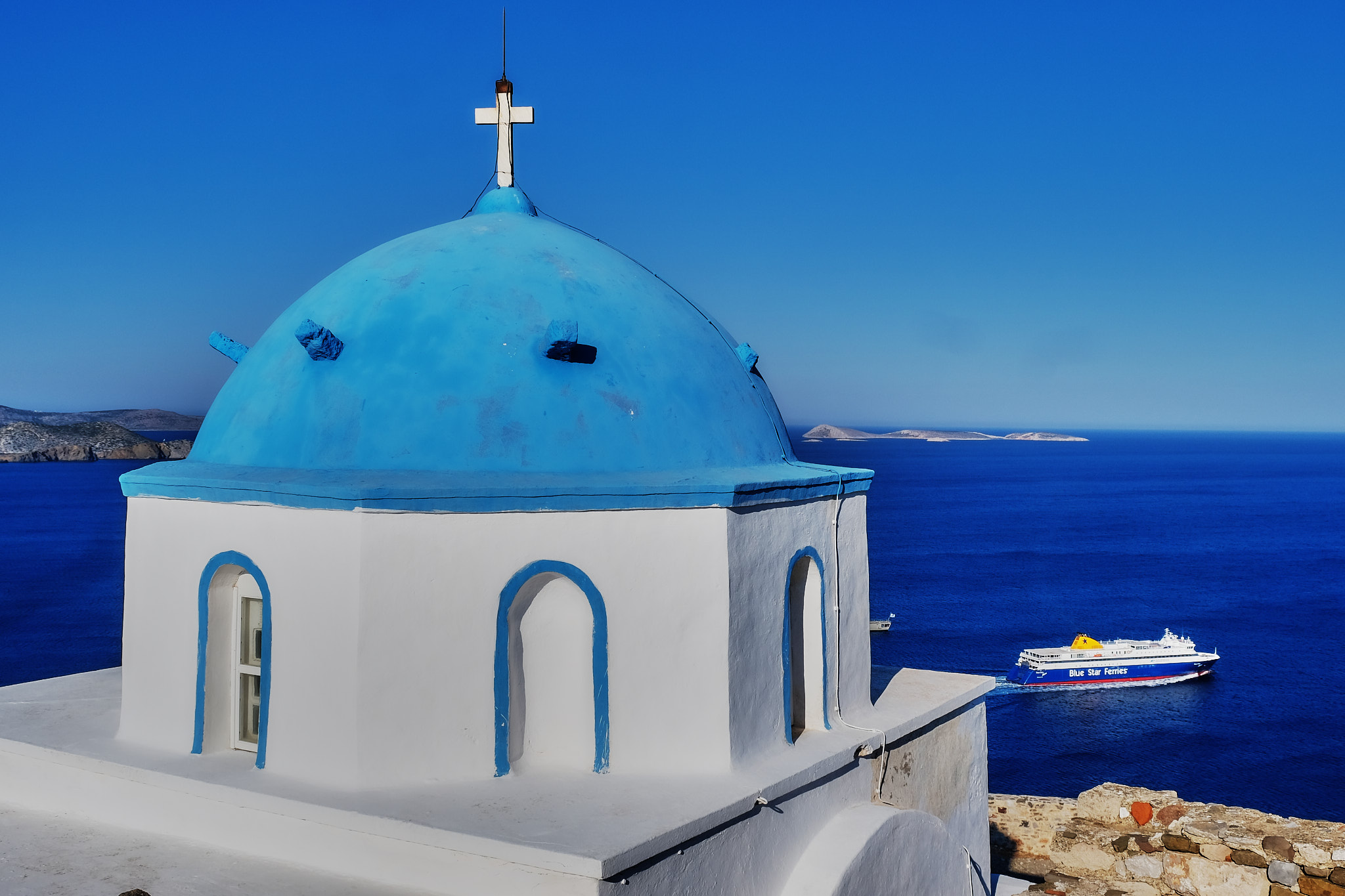
Blue Star Ferries leaving Astypalea, Greece

Multiple ports are located along the Greek and Turkish coasts of the Aegean Sea. The port of Piraeus in Athens is the chief port in Greece, the largest passenger port in Europe and the third largest in the world, servicing about 20 million passengers annually. With a throughput of 1.4 million TEUs, Piraeus is placed among the top ten ports in container traffic in Europe and the top container port in the Eastern Mediterranean. Piraeus is also the commercial hub of Greek shipping. Piraeus bi-annually acts as the focus for a major shipping convention, known as Posidonia, which attracts maritime industry professionals from all over the world. Piraeus is currently Greece's third-busiest port in terms of tons of goods transported, behind Agioi Theodoroi and Thessaloniki. The central port serves ferry routes to almost every island in the eastern portion of Greece, the island of Crete, the Cyclades, the Dodecanese, and much of the northern and the eastern Aegean Sea, while the western part of the port is used for cargo services.

As of 2007, the Port of Thessaloniki was the second-largest container port in Greece after the port of Piraeus, making it one of the busiest ports in Greece. In 2007, the Port of Thessaloniki handled 14,373,245 tonnes of cargo and 222,824 TEU's. Paloukia, on the island of Salamis, is a major passenger port.

=== Fishing ===
Fish are Greece's second-largest agricultural export, and Greece has Europe's largest fishing fleet. Fish captured include sardines, mackerel, grouper, grey mullets, sea bass, and seabream. There is a considerable difference between fish catches between the pelagic and demersal zones; with respect to pelagic fisheries, the catches from the northern, central and southern Aegean area groupings are dominated, respectively, by anchovy, horse mackerels, and boops. For demersal fisheries, the catches from the northern and southern Aegean area groupings are dominated by grey mullets and pickerel (Spicara smaris) respectively.

The industry has been impacted by the Great Recession. Overfishing and habitat destruction is also a concern, threatening grouper, and seabream populations, resulting in perhaps a 50% decline of fish catch. To address these concerns, Greek fishermen have been offered a compensation by the government. Although some species are defined as protected or threatened under EU legislation, several illegal species such as the molluscs Pinna nobilis, Charonia tritonis and Lithophaga lithophaga, can be bought in restaurants and fish markets around Greece.

=== Tourism ===
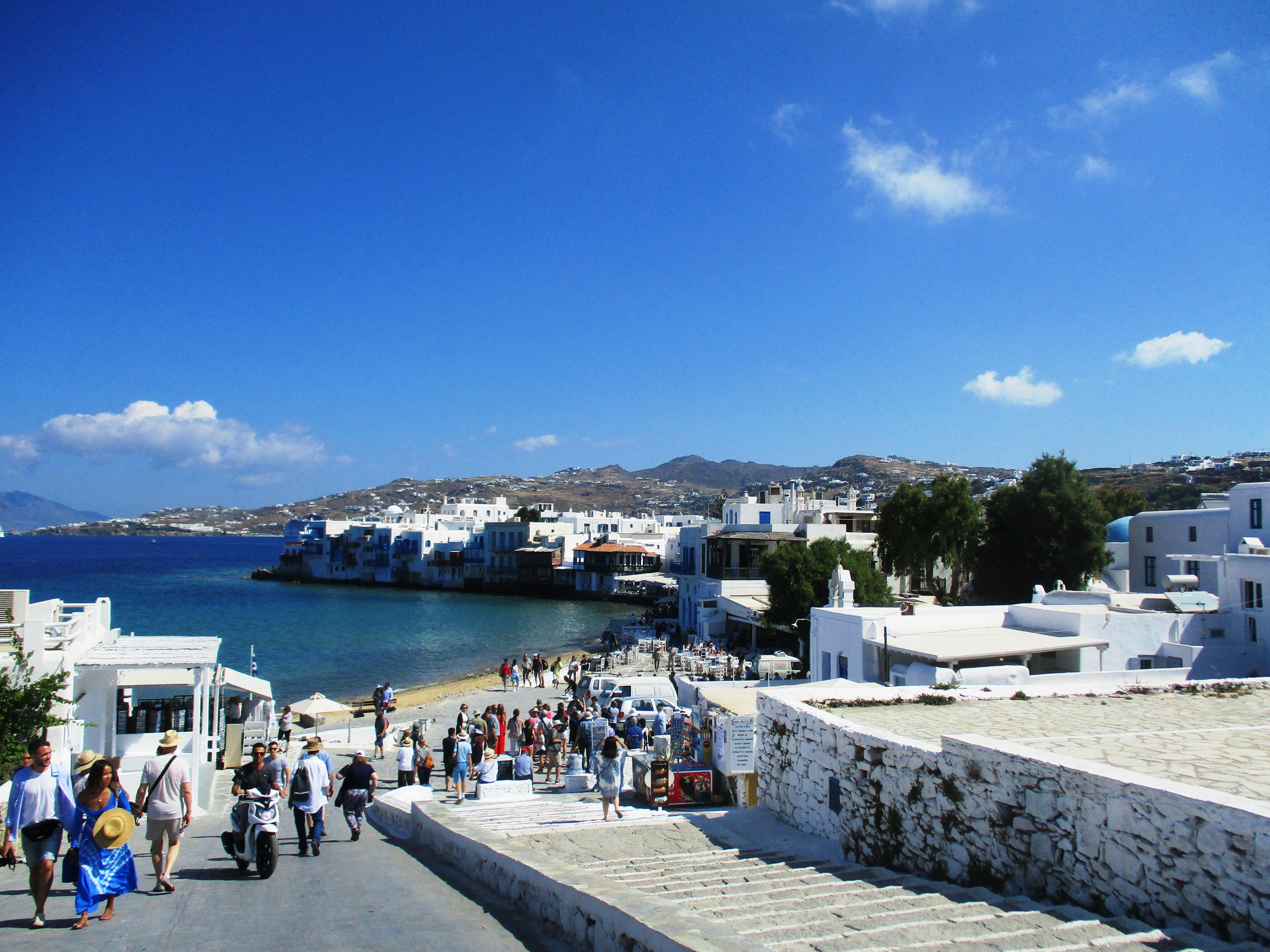
Tourists in the town of Mykonos, part of the Cyclades

The Aegean islands within the Aegean Sea are significant tourist destinations. Tourism to the Aegean islands contributes a significant portion of tourism in Greece, especially since the second half of the 20th century. A total of five UNESCO World Heritage sites are located the Aegean Islands; these include the Monastery of Saint John the Theologian and the Cave of the Apocalypse on Patmos, the Pythagoreion and Heraion of Samos in Samos, the Nea Moni of Chios, the island of Delos, and the Medieval City of Rhodes.

Greece is one of the most visited countries in Europe and the world with over 33 million visitors in 2018, and the tourism industry around a quarter of Greece's Gross Domestic Product. The islands of Santorini, Crete, Lesbos, Delos, and Mykonos are common tourist destinations. An estimated 2 million tourists visit Santorini annually. However, concerns relating to overtourism have arisen in recent years, such as issues of inadequate infrastructure and overcrowding. Alongside Greece, Turkey has also been successful in developing resort areas and attracting large number of tourists, contributing to tourism in Turkey. The phrase "Blue Cruise" refers to recreational voyages along the Turkish Riviera, including across the Aegean. The ancient city of Troy, a World Heritage Site, is on the Turkish coast of the Aegean.

Greece and Turkey both take part in the Blue Flag beach certification programme of the Foundation for Environmental Education. The certification is awarded for beaches and marinas meeting strict quality standards including environmental protection, water quality, safety and services criteria. As of 2015, the Blue Flag has been awarded to 395 beaches and 9 marinas in Greece. Southern Aegean beaches on the Turkish coast include Muğla, with 102 beaches awarded with the blue flag, along with İzmir and Aydın, who have 49 and 30 beaches awarded respectively.

== See also ==
- Exclusive economic zone of Greece
- Geography of Turkey
- Geography of Greece
- List of Greek place names
- Aegean Boat Report
- Balkanatolia
