= Somov Sea =

Proposed sea name in the Southern Ocean

Coordinates: 67°00′S 160°00′E

The proposed Somov Sea name and other proposed names as part of the Southern Ocean

Somov Sea (Russian: Море Сомова, romanized: More Somova, lit. 'Somov's Sea') was a proposed name for part of the Southern Ocean.

It would be located north of the easternmost part of the Antarctic subcontinent East Antarctica, north of Oates Coast, Victoria Land, and of George V Coast, between 150° and 170° East. West of it would be the D'Urville Sea. East of Cape Adare, at 170°14' East, is the Ross Sea.

The name was first proposed by the Russians for the 2002 International Hydrographic Organization (IHO) draft. This draft was never approved by the IHO (or any other organization), and the 1953 IHO document (which does not contain the name) remains currently in force. Leading geographic authorities and atlases do not use the name, including the 2014 10th edition World Atlas from the United States' National Geographic Society and the 2014 12th edition of the British Times Atlas of the World. But Soviet and Russian-issued map do.

The Somov Sea would have an area of 1,150,000 km² and be up to 3000 meters deep.

The Balleny Islands are 240 km north of the mainland coast here.

The Somov Sea would be named in honor of Russian oceanologist and polar explorer Mikhail Somov (1908–1973), who between 1955 and 1957 was the commander of the first Soviet Antarctic Expedition.
