= Cooperation Sea =

Proposed sea name for part of the Southern Ocean

Coordinates: 65°00′S 72°00′E

The proposed Cooperation Sea name as part of the Southern Ocean

Cooperation Sea, also called Commonwealth Sea (erratum) or Sodruzhestvo Sea (Russian: Море Содружества), is a proposed sea name for part of the Southern Ocean, between Enderby Land (the eastern limit of which is 59°34'E) and West Ice Shelf (85°E), off the coast of MacRobertson Land and Princess Elizabeth Land. It would stretch over an area of 258,000 km^{2}. It would be bordered by the Davis Sea on the east, and by another Russian proposal to the 2002 International Hydrographic Organization (IHO) draft, a Cosmonauts Sea to the west.

The Cooperation Sea was named in 1962 by the Soviet Antarctic Expedition in honor of international science cooperation in Antarctica. The name first appeared as a proposal to the IHO in the IHO 2002 draft. This draft was never approved by the IHO (or any other organization), and the 1953 IHO document (which does not contain the name) remains currently in force. Leading geographic authorities and atlases do not use the name, including the 2014 10th edition of the World Atlas from the United States' National Geographic Society and the 2014 12th edition of the British Times Atlas of the World. However, Soviet and Russian-issued maps do.

Davis Station is located on the coast near the sea.
