= Gulf of Chania =

Coordinates: 35.587°N 23.914°E

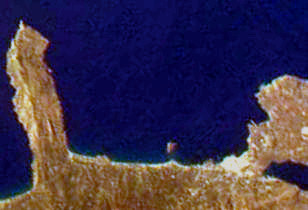
Satellite picture of Gulf of Chania

The Gulf of Chania is an embayment of the Sea of Crete in the northwestern region of the island of Crete in present-day Greece. One headland forming the Gulf of Chania is the promontory known as the Akrotiri Peninsula.

== Ancient history ==
In prehistory the powerful city of Kydonia commanded the Gulf of Chania and was a center of early Cretan art and culture in western Crete. By 74 BC the city-state of Kydonia fended off an attack by Rome in a naval battle in the Gulf of Chania.

== See also ==
- Britomartis
