= MedPAN =

Mediterranean Protected Areas Network (MedPAN)
- Founded: 6 November 2008; 17 years ago Marseille, France
- Type: International organization, Network of nature protection areas
- Purpose: Protected Marine Areas
- Location: Marseille, France
- Region served: Mediterranean Sea
- Members: 78 organizations
- Key people: Purificacio Canals, Marie Romani
- Employees: 8
- Website: medpan.org/about/

The Mediterranean Protected Areas Network (MedPAN) is one of the main non-governmental organizations dedicated to the protection of nature in the Mediterranean.

== Mission ==
Its mission is to promote the establishment, maintenance and operation of a network of marine protected areas (MPAs) throughout the Mediterranean for the conservation of its integrity and biodiversity, as well as to ensure that the use of natural marine resources is done in an equitable and sustainable manner. The aim is to federate MPAs from all over the region and to promote the sharing of experience and joint mobilization on common issues at the Mediterranean basin level.

== Functioning ==
Founded in 2008 under the technical coordination of WWF France and with the support of 9 founding members, its gestation was long and goes back to the 1990s. Its headquarters are located in Marseille, France. It brings together 78 organizations managing 110 marine protected areas in 21 countries, and leads a network of experts and scientists. It helps these countries and institutions to prepare and implement strategies for the protection of the sea.

== See also ==
- Ecological network
