= Thracian Sea =

Northernmost part of the Aegean sea

- Interactive map of Thracian Sea
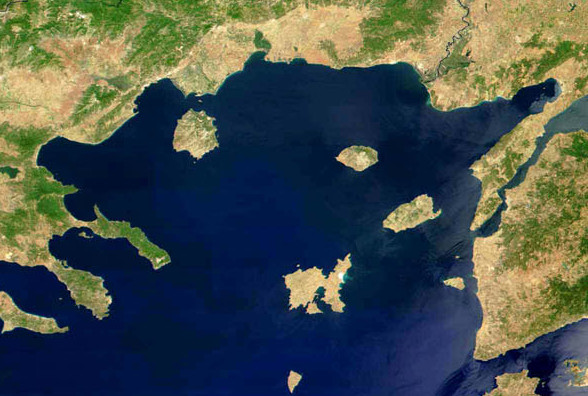
- Thracian Sea satellite picture
- Location: Mediterranean Sea

The Thracian Sea (Note: Greek: Θρακικό Πέλαγος, Thrakikó Pélagos; Latin: Thracium Mare; Turkish: Trakya Denizi; Bulgarian: Тракийско море, Trakiysko more) is the northernmost part of the Aegean Sea. It is bounded by eastern Macedonia, southern Thrace and northwestern Anatolia. It connects to the Black Sea through the Dardanelles Strait, the Marmara Sea, and the Bosphorus Strait.

The entire area of the sea lies north of the 40th parallel. Its length from east to west is from 23°E to about 25.8°E, or from the Strymonian Gulf east to the northernmost part of the Gallipoli peninsula and the width from north to south is about 40.25°N to 41°N, or from the Dardanelles north to the boundary between the Xanthi and the Rhodope regional units.

Islands in the Thracian Sea include Thasos and Samothrace in Greece, and Gökçeada (Imvros in Greek) in Turkey. In the south, the sea extends to the north coast of the island of Lemnos. The bays and gulfs include the Ierissian Gulf to the southwest, the Strymonian Gulf where the Strymon River empties, the Kavala Gulf and the Saros Gulf in Turkey. Rivers emptying into this portion of the gulf include the Nestos and the Evros/Meriç. The famous thermal springs are Loutra Eleftheron in Kavala.

The northern part of the Thracian Sea is a habitat for the endangered Black Sea harbor porpoise (Phocoena phocoena relicta).

== Ports ==
- Amfipoli
- Kavala
- Alexandroupoli
- Thasos
- Samothrace

== Gallery ==
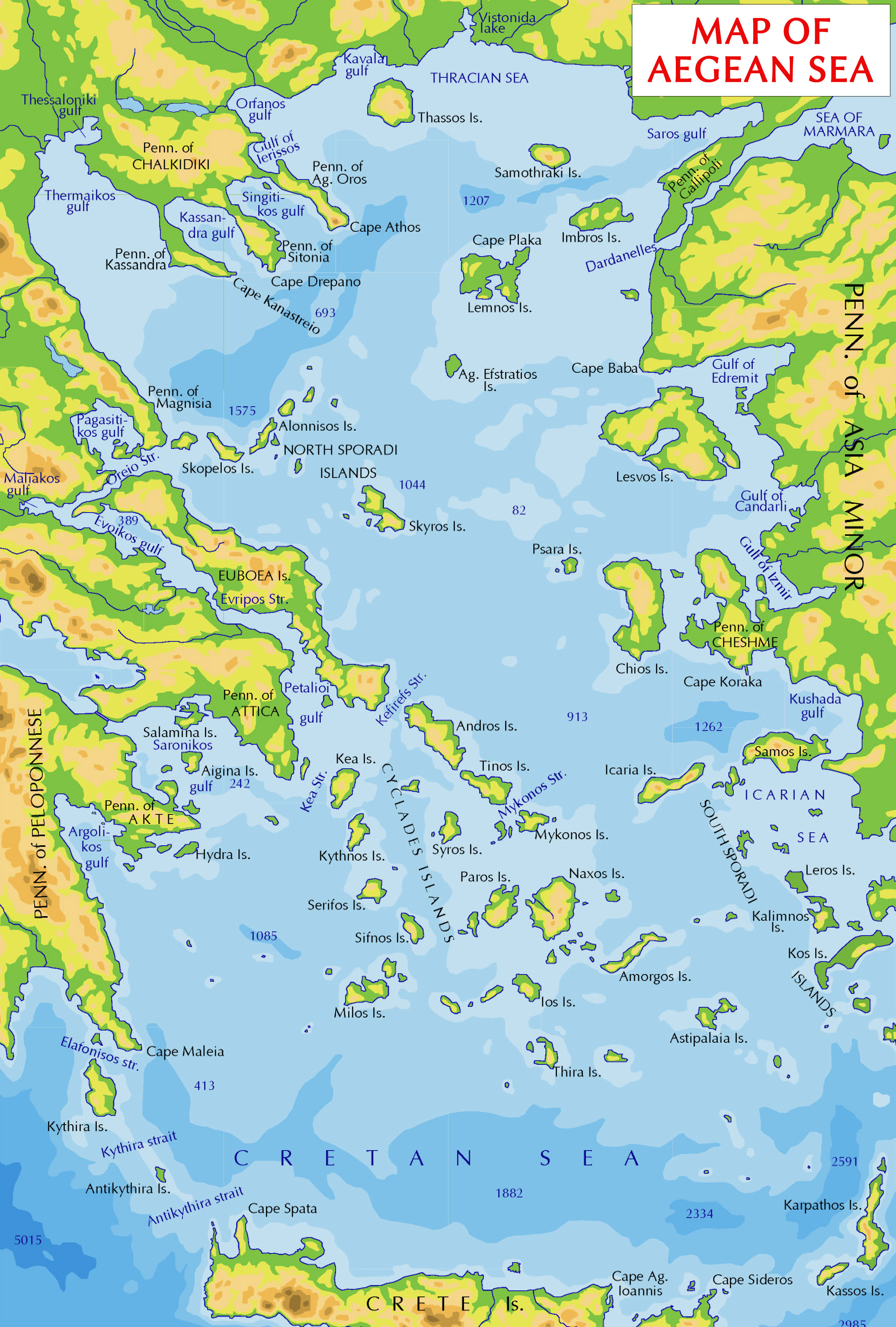
Map of the Aegean Sea. The Thracian Sea can be seen at the top

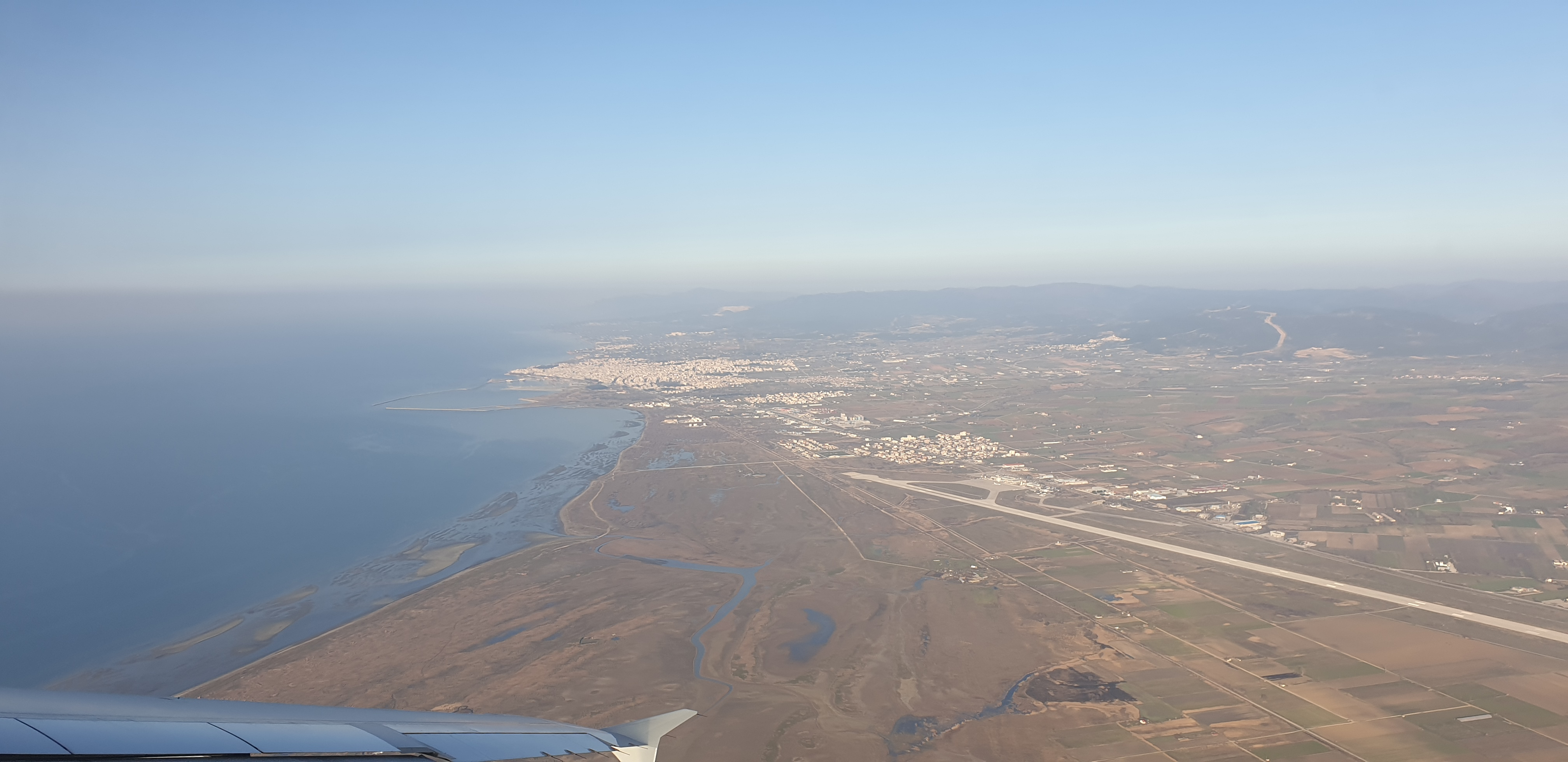
Alexandroupolis, Greece

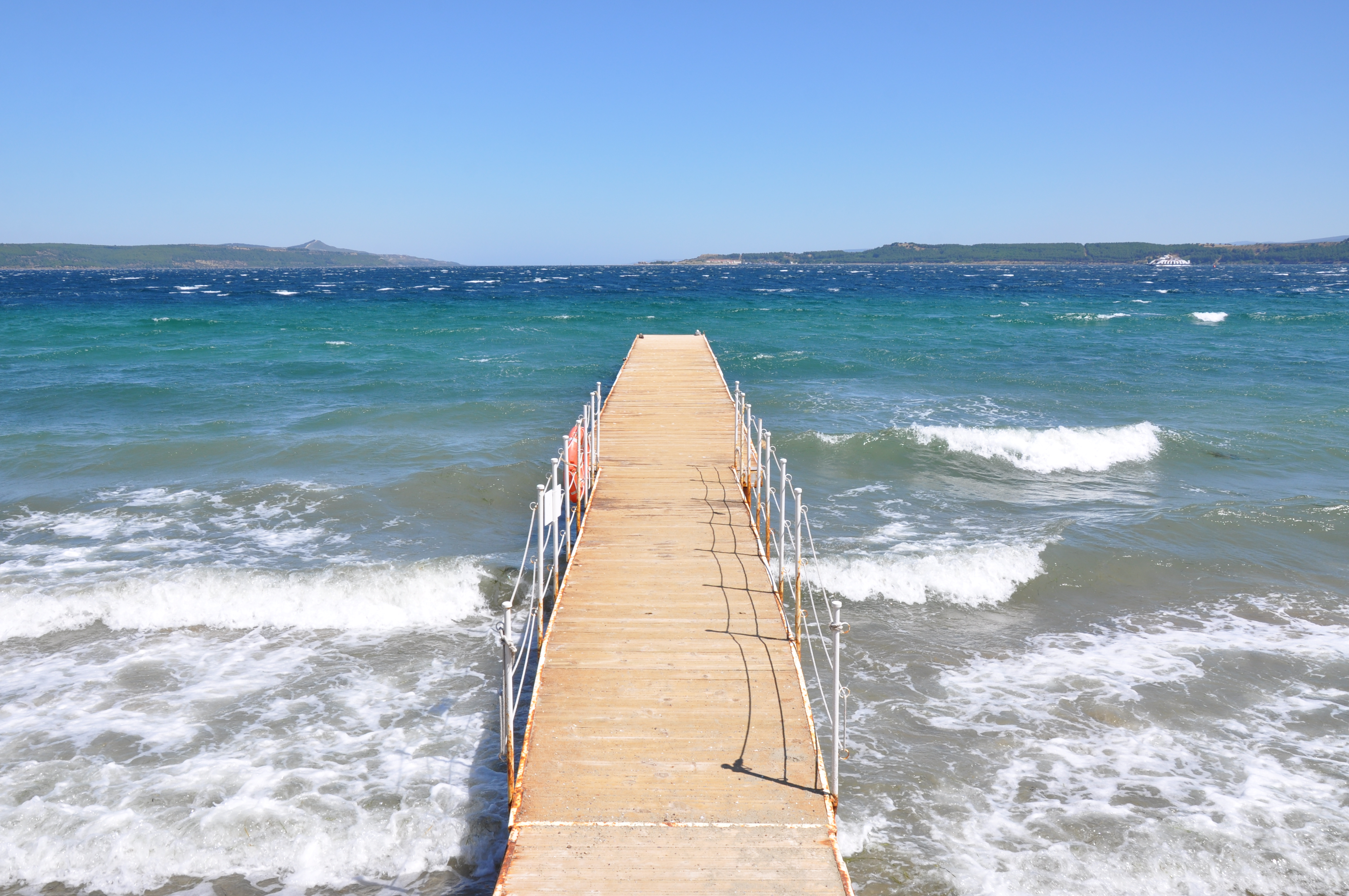
Gallipoli, Turkey

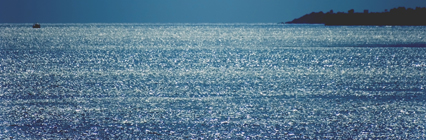
Thracian Sea

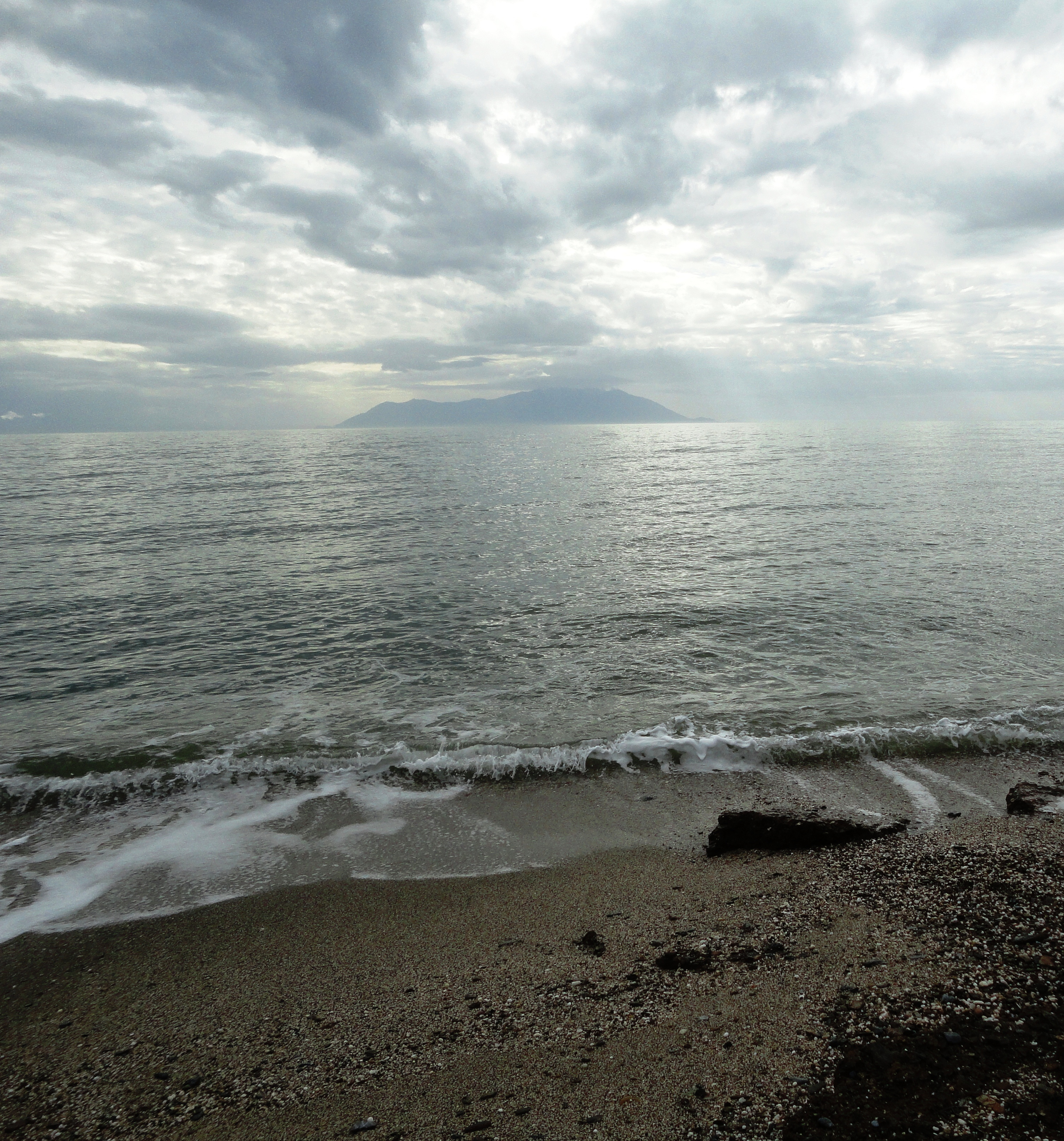
Samothraki island from Dikella beach
