= Cosmonauts Sea =

Proposed name of a sea in the Southern Ocean

Coordinates: 65°00′S 45°00′E

Location of the Cosmonauts Sea, proposed as a sea of the Southern Ocean

The Cosmonauts Sea (Russian: Море Космонавтов, More Kosmonavtov; sometimes misspelled Cosmonaut Sea) was a proposed sea name as part of the Southern Ocean, off the Prince Olav Coast and Enderby Land, Antarctica, between about 30°E and 50°E. It would have an area of 699,000 square kilometres (270,000 sq mi). It would be bordered by two other proposals from a 2002 International Hydrographic Organization (IHO) draft, a Cooperation Sea to the east and a Riiser-Larsen Sea to the west.

The Cosmonauts Sea, which was named in 1962 by the Soviet Antarctic Expedition in honor of the world's first cosmonauts and the beginning of the crewed space exploration era, The name first appeared as a Russian proposal to the IHO in the IHO 2002 draft. This draft was never approved by the IHO (or any other organization), and the 1953 IHO document remains currently in force. Leading geographic authorities and atlases do not use the name, including the 2014 10th edition of the World Atlas from the United States' National Geographic Society and the 2014 12th edition of the British Times Atlas of the World, though state-issued maps created by the Soviet Union did.

The water here is close to freezing throughout the year and is mostly covered by ice. Between 1973 and 1986, several polynyas have occurred in these waters, with the totally enclosed Cosmonaut polynya attaining its maximum size on July 25, 1980, with an open water area of as much as 137,700 km2. This polynya lasted for several weeks before disappearing on August 16, 1980.
