= Sea of Crete =

Aegean Sea southern portion

Coordinates: 36°N 25°E

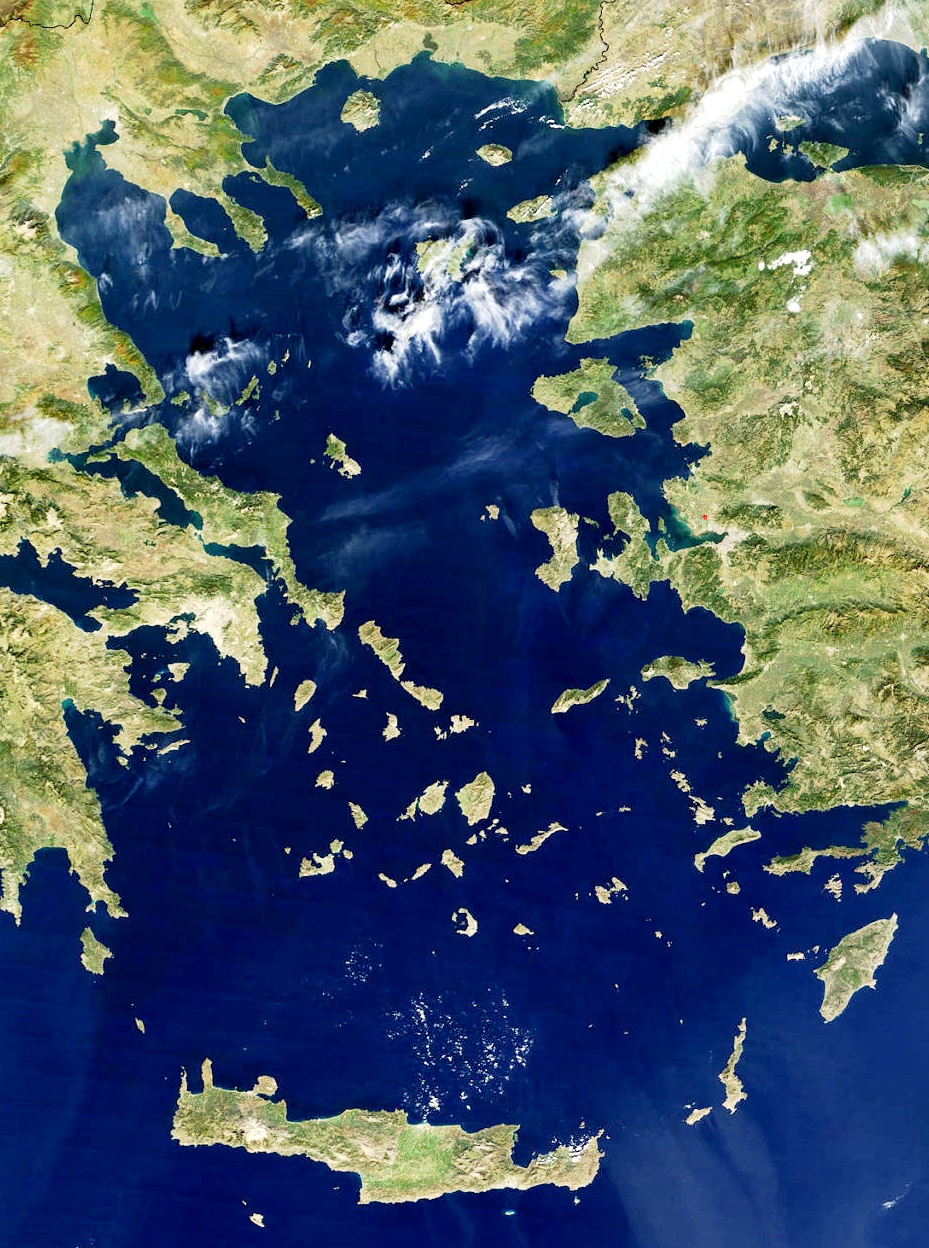
Satellite image of the Aegean Sea

The Sea of Crete (Greek: Κρητικό Πέλαγος, Kritiko Pelagos), or Cretan Sea, is a sea, part of the Aegean Sea, located in its southern part, with a total surface area of 45,000 km^{2} (17,000 sq mi). The sea stretches to the north of the island of Crete, east of the islands of Kythera and Antikythera, south of the Cyclades, and west of the Dodecanese islands of Rhodes, Karpathos and Kassos. The bounding sea to the west is the Ionian Sea. To the northwest is the Myrtoan Sea, a subdivision of the Mediterranean Sea that lies between the Cyclades and Peloponnese. To the east-southeast is the rest of the Mediterranean Sea, sometimes credited as the Levantine Sea. Across the island of Crete, to the opposite shore of it begins the Libyan Sea. Ferry routes to and from Piraeus and Heraklion, as well as the southern islands of the Aegean and the Dodecanese, run in this area.

Just off the coastline of Northeastern Crete, the sea reaches a maximum depth of near 3,293 m (10,000 ft). Other sources (maps) show a maximum depth of 2,591 m (8,500 ft).

== Port towns and cities ==
- Kastelli-Kissamos, southwest
- Chania, southwest
- Souda, south-southwest
- Rethymno, south
- Heraklion, south
- Agios Nikolaos, southeast
- Sitia, southeast
- Kasos (Fry), southeast
- Anafi, northeast
- Thira, north

== Bays ==
- Chania Bay, south
- Souda Bay, southeast
- Almyros Bay, south
- Mirabello Bay, southeast
