= Antarctic gyres =

Antarctic gyre may refer to any of the three ocean currents and gyres within the Southern Ocean:

- Antarctic Circumpolar Current, an ocean current circulating around Antarctica
- Ross Gyre, an oceanic gyre in the Ross Sea
- Weddell Gyre, an oceanic gyre in the Weddell Sea
