= Leeuwin Current =

Ocean current off Western Australia

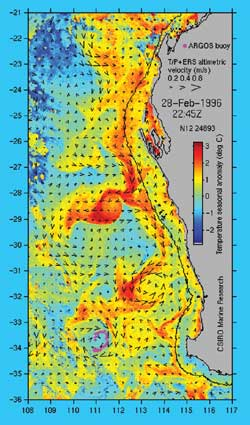
Data from two satellite instruments is used in constructing this image of the Leeuwin Current.

The Leeuwin Current is a warm ocean current which flows southwards near the western coast of Australia. It rounds Cape Leeuwin to enter the waters south of Australia where its influence extends as far as Tasmania.

== Discovery ==
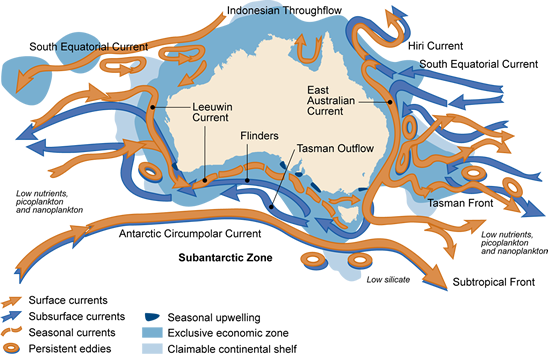
Ocean currents surrounding Australia. The Leeuwin Current can be seen off the Western Australian Coast.

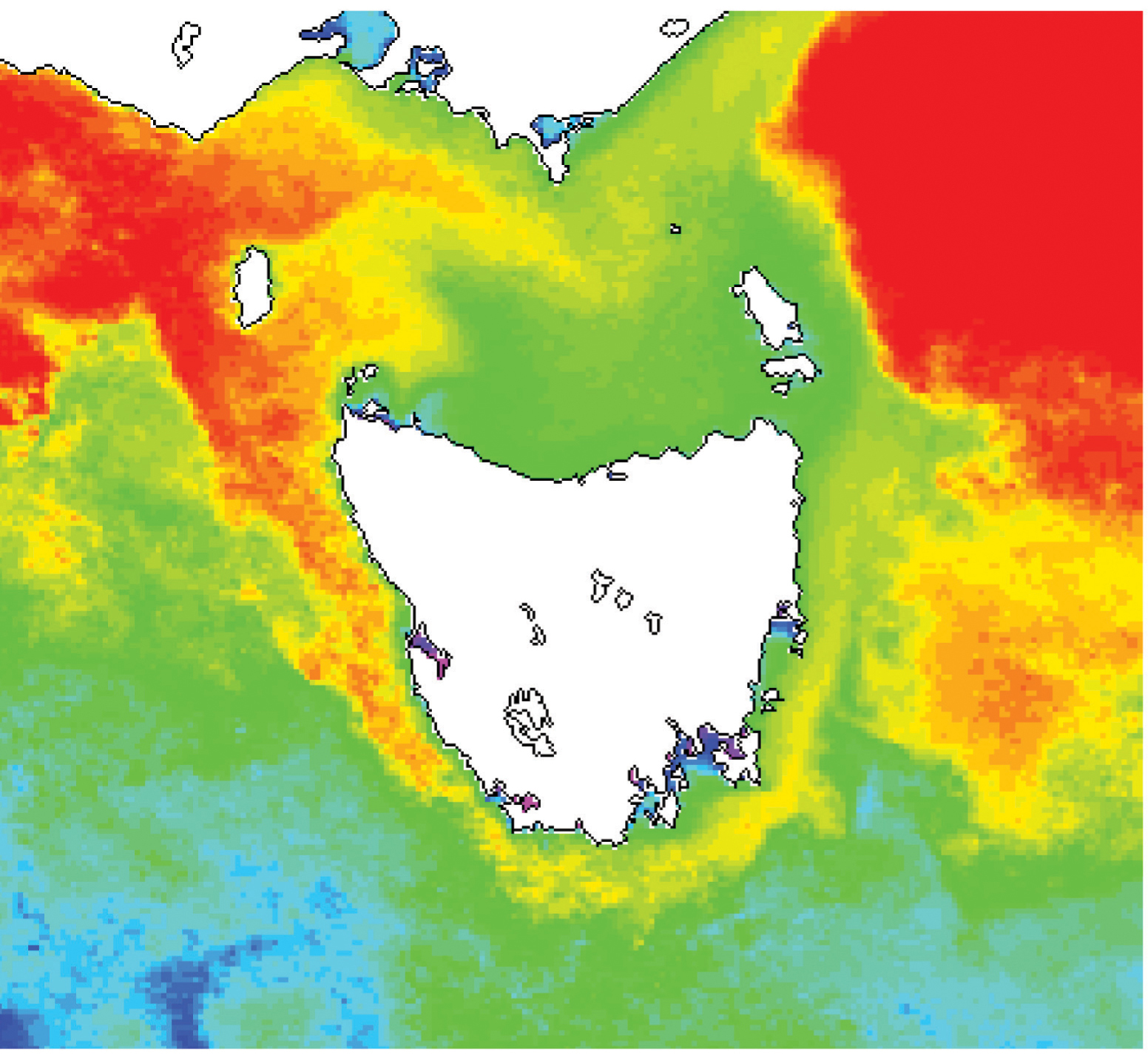
CSIRO NOAA polar orbiting satellites obtain the data generating sea surface temperature images. (Composite 15-day image showing the extension of the Leeuwin Current around Tasmania)

The existence of the current was first suggested by William Saville-Kent in 1897. Saville-Kent noted the presence of warm tropical water offshore in the Houtman Abrolhos, making the water there in winter much warmer than inshore at the adjacent coast. The existence of the current was confirmed over the years, but not characterised and named until Cresswell and Golding did so in the 1980s.

== Track ==
The West Australian Current and Southern Australian Countercurrent, which are produced by the West Wind Drift on the southern Indian Ocean and at Tasmania, respectively, flow in the opposite direction, producing one of the most interesting oceanic current systems in the world.

The ‘core’ of the Leeuwin Current can generally be detected as a peak in the surface temperature with a strong temperature decrease further offshore. The surface temperature difference across the Current is about 1 °C at North West Cape, 2° to 3° at Fremantle and can be over 4° off Albany in the Great Australian Bight. The current frequently breaks out to sea, forming both clockwise and anti-clockwise eddies.

== Physical properties ==
Its strength varies through the year; it is weakest during the summer months (winter in the northern hemisphere) from November to March when the winds tend to blow strongly from the south west northwards. The greatest flow is in the autumn and winter (March to November) when the opposing winds are weakest. Evaporation from the Leeuwin current during this period contributes greatly to the rainfall in the southwest region of Western Australia.

Typically the Leeuwin Current's speed and its eddies are about 1 knot (50 cm/s), although speeds of 2 knots (1 m/s) are common, and the highest speed ever recorded by a drifting satellite-tracked buoy was 3.5 knots (6.5 km/h). The Leeuwin Current is shallow for a major current system, by global standards, being about 300 m deep, and lies on top of a northwards countercurrent called the Leeuwin Undercurrent.

Because of the Leeuwin Current, the continental shelf waters of Western Australia are warmer in winter and cooler in summer than the corresponding regions off the other continents. The Leeuwin Current is also responsible for the presence of the most southerly true corals at the Abrolhos Islands and the transport of tropical marine species down the west coast and across into the Great Australian Bight.

The Leeuwin Current is influenced by El Niño conditions, characterised by slightly lower sea temperatures along the Western Australian coast and a weaker Leeuwin Current, with corresponding effects upon rainfall patterns.

== Comparisons ==
The Leeuwin Current is very different from the cooler, equatorward flowing currents found along coasts at equivalent latitudes such as the southwest African Coast (the Benguela Current); the long Chile-Peru Coast (the Humboldt Current), where upwelling of cool nutrient-rich waters from below the surface results in some of the most productive fisheries; the California Current, which brings foggy conditions to San Francisco; or the cool Canary current of North Africa.

== See also ==
- Ocean current
- Oceanic gyres
- Physical oceanography
- West Australian Current
