= Agulhas Leakage =

Flow of water from the Indian Ocean to the Atlantic

The Agulhas Leakage is an inflow of anomalously warm and saline water from the Indian Ocean into the South Atlantic due to the limited latitudinal extent of the African continent compared to the southern extension of the subtropical super gyre in the Indian Ocean. The process occurs during the retroflection of the Agulhas Current via shedding of anticyclonic Agulhas Rings, cyclonic eddies and direct inflow. The leakage contributes to the Atlantic Meridional Overturning Circulation (AMOC) by supplying its upper limb, which has direct climate implications.

== Pathway ==
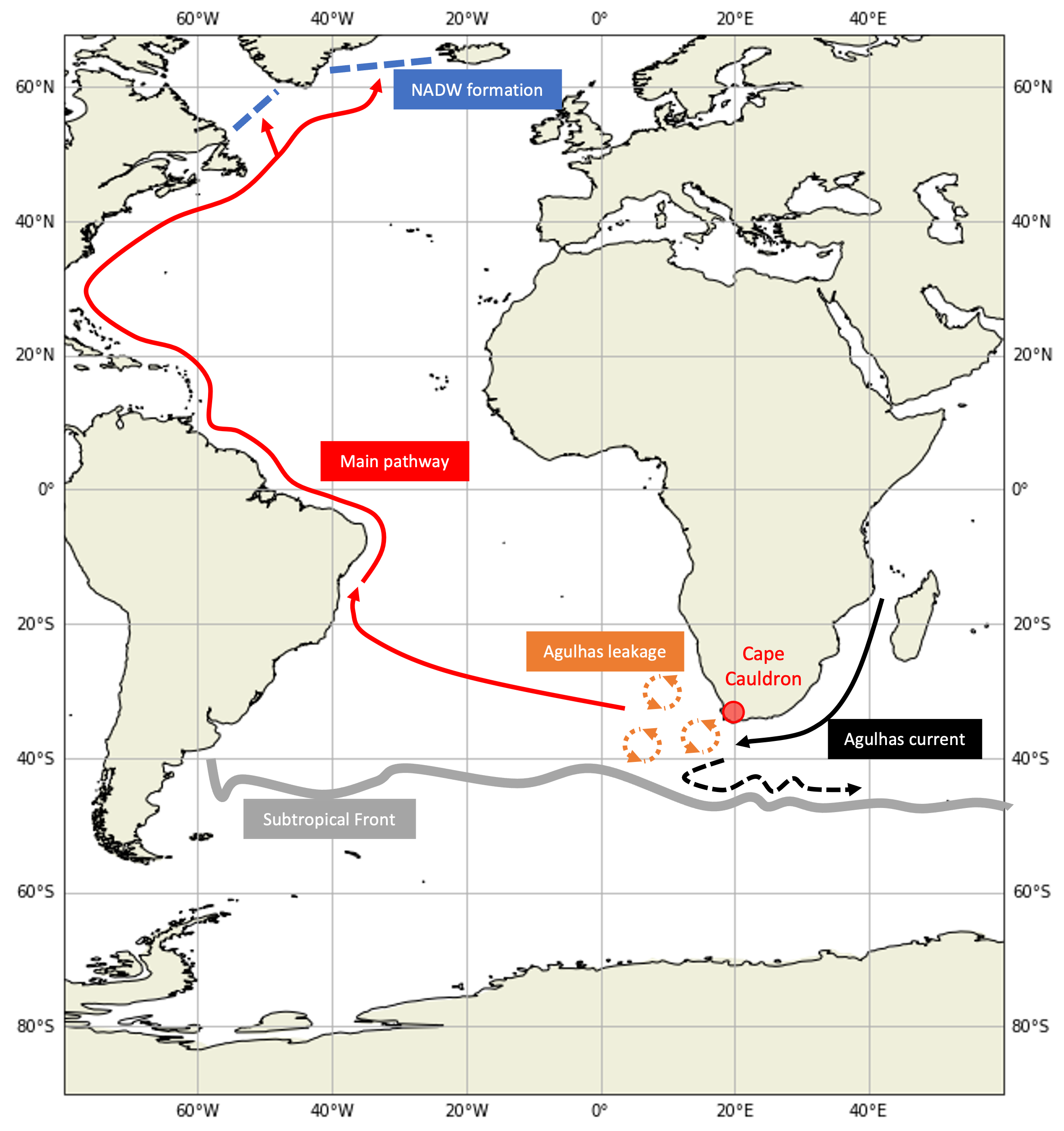
Simplified main pathway (red line) of the Agulhas leakage (orange dotted line). The lines represent: the Agulhas current (black solid line) with its retroflection (black dashed line), Subtropical Front (grey line) and areas of deep-water formation (blue dashed lines)

Animations of the variability of the surface current velocity (top), sea surface height (middle), sea surface temperature (bottom) around the southern tip of Africa. The Agulhas leakage can be observed as eddies, rings and filaments flowing into the Atlantic Ocean Animations of the variability of the surface current velocity (top), sea surface height (middle), sea surface temperature (bottom) around the southern tip of Africa. The Agulhas leakage can be observed as eddies, rings and filaments flowing into the Atlantic Ocean.

The Agulhas Current carries around 70 Sv southward towards 32°S. When the current passes the southern African tip, it changes direction and returns to the Indian Ocean. However, part of it (around 2-15 Sv) leaks into the Southern Atlantic. The leakage is mainly driven by large anticyclonic eddies shedded from the retroflection. The process is also induced by cyclonic eddies formed when the main current detaches from the continental shelf and filaments peeled directly from the main current.

After reaching the Atlantic, the leakage enters the Cape Cauldron and the majority of the leakage propagates further north-westwards through the Benguela Current, South Equatorial Current, and finally crosses the equator along with the North Brazil Current. It then joins the Loop Current and the Gulf Stream. Part of the leakage follows the extension of the Indian-Atlantic supergyre to the Pacific Ocean.

A small part of it follows the "cold water route", by looping along the Antarctic Circumpolar Current and entering the Atlantic through the Drake Passage.

== Dynamics of the leakage ==
The Agulhas Current represents a western boundary current which is primarily driven by a positive wind stress curl. The presence of the African continent allows for the southward flow of the current. Beyond Cape Agulhas, further southward propagation is no longer maintained by the western boundary. With large inertia, the current reaches the latitude of maximum westerlies (40°S) associated with neutral wind stress and loops back into the Indian Ocean (Agulhas retroflection). Without sufficient inertia, it turns westwards and leaks into the Atlantic Ocean.

=== Variability of the leakage ===
The strength of the southward inertia and the position of the Subtropical Front (STF) are the key factors in the generation of the Agulhas leakage. Both of them are primarily controlled by the strength and the pattern of the wind field over the Indian Ocean.

- If the STF moves southward, the gap between South Africa and the westerlies becomes wider. The current thus needs more inertia to retroflect and more leakage occurs.
- If the wind field is weaker, the strength of the Agulhas Current is reduced. This leads to smaller inertial overshoot resulting in stronger leakage.

Generation of the Agulhas rings is also an important driver of the leakage. This depends on instabilities, topography, and mesoscale non-linear dynamics.

=== Paleoclimate ===
The strength and location of the Agulhas Current, as well as the leakage can be reconstructed based on paleoceanographic data such as the provenance of sediments (presence of planktic foraminiferal species Globorotalia menardii, isotope ratio (87Sr/86Sr) in deep ocean cores, abundance of Agulhas fauna).

Paleoclimate observations allow for a reconstruction of the leakage for up to 1 350 000 years (mid Pleistocene). It has been shown that the leakage was more intense during interglacial periods. Those periods are characterized by a southward shift of the Subtropical Front associated with stronger leakage.

Paleoclimate data suggest that the strength of the leakage is positively correlated with the sea surface temperature, which is higher during interglacials. Moreover, the strength of the leakage was shown to be linked to the strength of the AMOC.

=== Climate change ===
There is evidence indicating that anthropogenic climate change causes southward expansion of the Indian Ocean subtropical gyre, which results in a southward shift of the westerlies. Simultaneously, no significant trend in wind curl value is observed. As a result, the latitude of the zero wind curl migrates towards the south and the leakage intensifies.

Modelling studies suggest that, in some scenarios, an increase in the influx of saline warm water from Agulhas leakage—resulting from a southward shift of the Subtropical Front (STF)—could offset the effects of freshwater-induced weakening of the Atlantic Meridional Overturning Circulation (AMOC).

Moreover, there has been an increase in eddy kinetic energy in the Southeast Atlantic associated with more eddies and rings being formed leading to stronger leakage.

== AMOC implications ==
The Agulhas leakage can potentially play a role in global climate because of its impact on the strength of the AMOC.

The leakage can modify the AMOC through:

- buoyancy forcing,
- wind stress changes,
- planetary wave perturbations.

The leakage brings relatively warm and saline water into the Atlantic basin which has two contrary effects on the density. Around the Southern tip of Africa, the heat input has a dominant effect resulting in a negative density anomaly. Further northward propagation leads to atmospheric heat loss and only the salinity anomaly remains which is manifested as a positive density anomaly. The associated buoyancy forcing enhances the Atlantic meridional density gradient giving rise to the North Atlantic Deep Water (NADW) formation which strengthens the AMOC.

The propagation of anticyclonic rings into the Atlantic leads to the density surfaces depression inducing planetary waves formation. This can result in AMOC oscillations on both short and interannual-to-decadal time scales.

== See also ==
- Agulhas current
- AMOC
- Western boundary current
