= West Australian Current =

Cool oceanic current

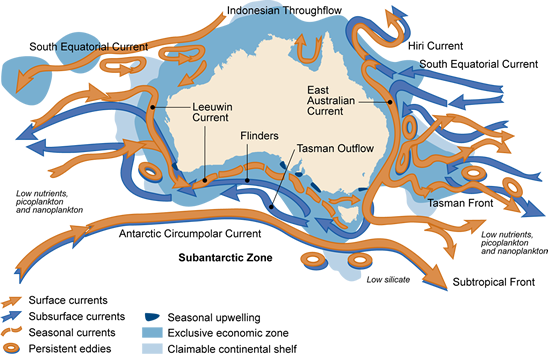
Ocean Currents surrounding Australia. The West Australian Current is located where the Leeuwin Current is labeled and flows in the opposite direction to the Leeuwin Current.

The West Australian Current (or the Western Australian Current) is a cool surface current of the Southern Ocean and Southern Indian Ocean.

== Track ==
It starts as the Southern Indian Ocean Current, a part of the larger Antarctic Circumpolar Current (also known as the West Wind Drift). As the current approaches Western Australia, it turns north, parallel to the western coast of Australia, and becomes the West Australian Current.

== Effects ==
The current is mainly seasonal, being weaker in winter and stronger in summer, and is affected by the winds in that area.

In addition to the West Australian Current flowing on the Western Australian Coast, the Leeuwin Current and Southern Australian Countercurrent, also flow along this coast, with the former flowing in the opposite direction. These three currents together contribute greatly to the rainfall and climate in the southwest region of Western Australia.

== See also ==
- Ocean current
- Oceanic gyres
- Physical oceanography
