= Weddell Sea Bottom Water =

Subset of Antarctic Bottom Water mass that is at -0.7 °C or colder

Weddell Sea Bottom Water (WSBW) is a subset of Antarctic Bottom Water (AABW) that is at a temperature of -0.7 °C or colder. It consists of a higher salinity branch and a lower salinity branch. It originates in the Weddell Sea and closely follows the sea floor as it flows out into the rest of the world's oceans. It is created mainly due to the high surface winds blowing off the Antarctic continent which helps cool and oxygenate it. It flows at a rate of 2 to 5 Sv and contributes to the overall flow of the AABW.

== Introduction ==
The Weddell Sea plays an important role in the movement of the world's oceans. An important part of the Weddell Sea is Weddell Sea Bottom Water (WSBW). WSBW is a major contributor to Antarctic Bottom Water (AABW). While WSBW is considered part of AABW, the distinction comes in its potential temperature. The potential temperature of WSBW is -0.7 °C. At this temperature, the potential temperature vs. salinity chart shows a sharp change in slope. The outflow of WSBW is influenced greatly by the Scotia Ridge. The movement of WBSW is listed as 16 Sv which contributes to a total 97 Sv outflow of AABW. 2 to 5 Sv of this production is newly formed bottom water off the Antarctic coast.

== Formation ==
The Weddell Sea is characterized by a cyclonic gyre bounded on the south by the Antarctic continent, on the west by the Antarctic Peninsula, on the north by the Scotia Ridge, and extending as far east as 20 to 30°E. The precursor to bottom water formation is derived from the broad continental shelf west of 40°W where brine released during sea-ice formation produces a large reservoir of cold (0 to - 1.8 °C), high salinity (S ≥ 34.62 psu) shelf water. This water mass then mixes with a modified form of Warm Deep Water near the edge of the continental shelf to form a dense layer of bottom water, which in turn sinks along the continental slope and flows cyclonically around the western and northern perimeter of the Weddell Sea basin. Because large quantities of the high salinity water are observed on the continental shelf even during summer, bottom water may form throughout the year.

Weddell Sea Bottom Water exhibits two forms: a low-salinity, better oxygenated component confined to the outer rim of the Weddell Gyre, and a more saline, less oxygenated component observed farther into the gyre. The more saline WSBW is derived from the southwestern Weddell Sea, where high salinity shelf water is abundant. The less saline WSBW, like the more ventilated Weddell Sea Deep Water (WSDW), is derived from lower-salinity shelf water at a point farther north along the Antarctic Peninsula.

It is important to distinguish between AABW and a subclass of this water mass, WSBW. WSBW is characterized by lower potential temperatures and larger near-bottom temperature gradients, suggesting recent formation in the southwestern and western Weddell Sea. As this bottom water spreads from its region of sinking, it eventually mixes with the warmer and more saline water above to form AABW. Along the Scotia Ridge-Cape Norvegia section, potential temperature values at depths greater than 4,500 m (14,800 ft) range from -0.94 to -0.63 °C, while salinity values range from 34.639 to 34.652 psu. The northern limit of the core of Weddell Sea Bottom Water lies against the southern edge of the Scotia Ridge, suggesting that the circulation and property distributions are strongly influenced by bathymetry.

== Transport ==
The transport of Weddell Sea Bottom Water out of the Weddell Sea represents the outflow of newly formed bottom water plus entrained bottom water that enters the Weddell Sea from the southeast. Carmack and Foster estimated the production rate of bottom water from the mixing ratio of newly formed bottom water to entrained bottom water. Bottom water formation models based on hydrographic observations suggested that the bottom water formed at the edge of the continental shelf has an initial temperature of -1.4 to -1.2 °C. This range also represents the coldest bottom water observed at the base of the continental slope in the northwestern corner of the Weddell Sea. The fraction of newly formed bottom water in the outflowing WSBW ranges from about 12 to 31%, so the flow of newly formed bottom water out of the Weddell Sea is about 2 to 5 Sv. On the other hand, the much larger production rates sometimes proposed are probably estimates of the total transport of bottom water out of the Weddell Sea that include a large fraction of Antarctic Bottom Water entering the Weddell Sea from the southeast.

The low-salinity, better ventilated forms of WSDW and WSBW flowing along the outer rim of the Weddell Gyre have the position and depth range that would lead to overflow of the topographic confines of the Weddell Basin, whereas the more saline forms may be forced to recirculate within the Weddell Gyre are carried by the western boundary current of the Weddell Sea into the northwest corner of the Weddell Gyre. From there, these water masses flow eastward, either within the northern limb of the Weddell Gyre or reaching northward into the Scotia Sea, eventually cooling the lower 2 km of the world ocean as Antarctic Bottom Water.

It is proposed that the more saline, lower-oxygen WSBW is derived from shelf water descending into the deep ocean in the southwest Weddell Sea. The higher salinity of this WSBW is due to injection of high-salinity shelf water characteristic of the region. Fahrbach et al. propose that low-salinity bottom water is formed near the Larsen Ice Shelf.

== Climate impacts ==
McKee et al., conducted a study of the variability of bottom water temperature relative to El Niño-Southern Oscillation (ENSO), Southern Annular Mode (SAM), and Antarctic Dipole (ADP). This study was conducted to discover the impact WSBW has on the global climate. An 8-year time study of the potential temperature of the Weddell Gyre outflow was analyzed. Interannual variability was discovered in the winters of 1999 and 2002. The anomalies suggest ENSO influence with a 14-20 month lead time with influences from SAM at 14-20 month lead times as well. Warm ENSO events cause the increase of sea ice advection and more coastal polynyas which allows for more dense shelf water availability. These ENSO and SAM changes impact the WSBW 14–20 months later. Their research suggests that there needs to be large ENSO and SAM events in order for the anomalies in WSBW temperature can be noticed. These large fluctuations allow for warm and cold pulses in the WSBW. With a strong ENSO event, sea ice is greatly reduced during the summer which exposes more surface water to the wind allowing it sink. This makes the WSBW colder than normal allowing it to inject colder water into much of the world's oceans. If the ENSO even is weak enough, the surface winds off the Antarctic coast can shift direction which creates a reduction in shelf water. This will warm the WSBW as it does not have as much access to the cold, dense surface water.
