= Ross Gyre =

Circulating system of ocean currents in the Ross Sea

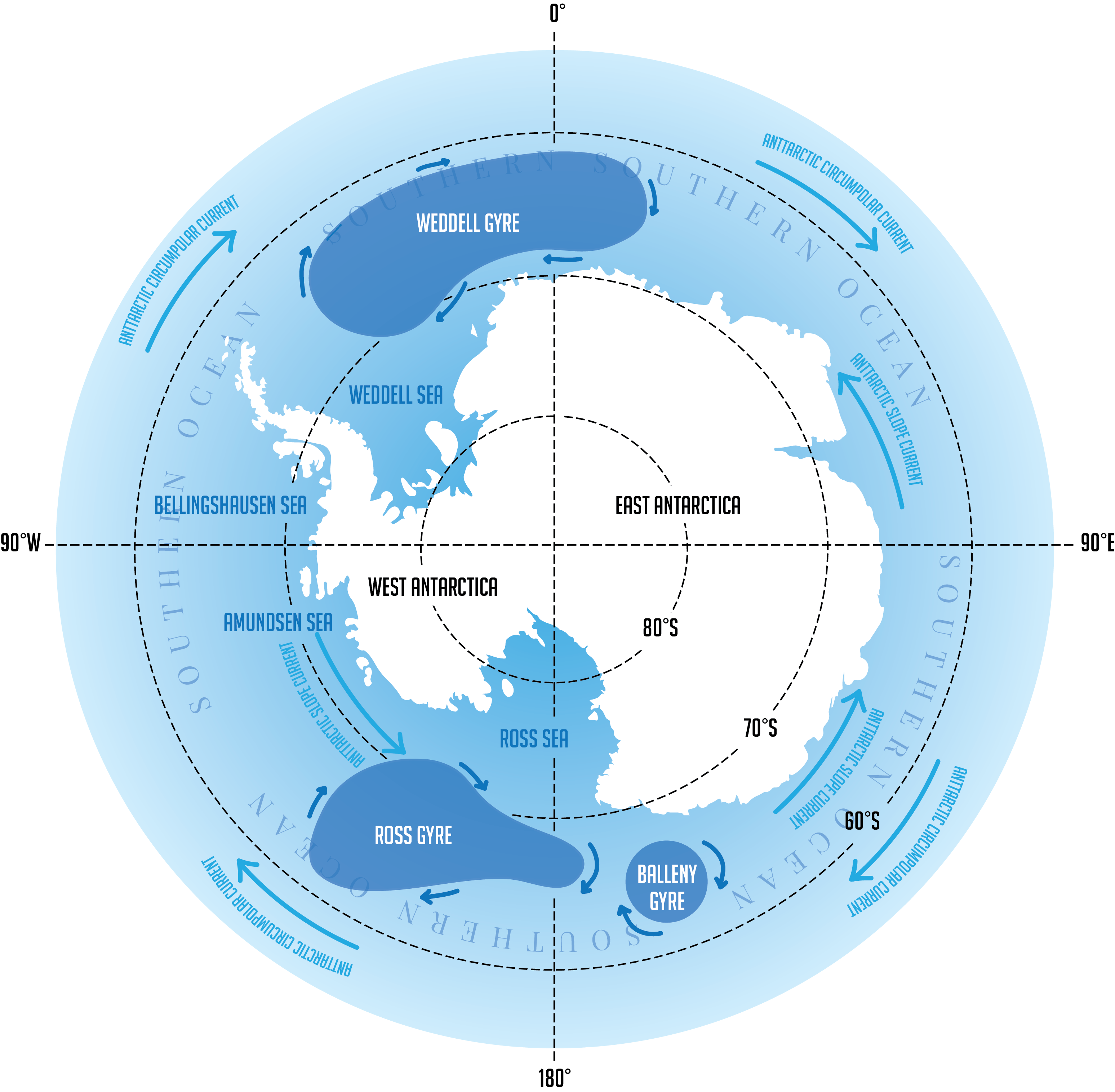
Schematic representation of the Ross Gyre and the other Southern Ocean main currents.

The Ross Gyre is one of three gyres that exists within the Southern Ocean around Antarctica, the others being the Weddell Gyre and Balleny Gyre. The Ross Gyre is located north of the Ross Sea, and rotates clockwise. The gyre is formed by interactions between the Antarctic Circumpolar Current and the Antarctic Continental Shelf. The Ross Gyre is bounded by the Polar Front of the Antarctic Circumpolar Current to the north, the Antarctic Slope Current to the south, the Balleny Gyre to the west, and a variable boundary to the east from semiannual changes in sea surface height (SSH) in the Amundsen Sea. Circulation in the Ross Gyre has been estimated to be 20 ± 5 Sverdrup (Sv) and plays a large role in heat exchange in this region.

The salinity, nutrient, and carbon patterns in the gyre are related to seasonal ice cover and freshwater input.

Antarctic toothfish, orcas, Adélie penguins, Antarctic krill, Salpidae, Slender-billed prion and many other seabirds spend part of their lives in the Ross Gyre.

Climate change predictions anticipate a strengthening of the gyre's circulation which would increase shelf ice melt and slowdown deep water formation.

== Spatial extent and physical processes ==
=== Geographic boundaries ===
The Ross Gyre is a clockwise-rotating water mass that lies north of the Ross Sea. This gyre is bounded to the north by the Polar Front of the Antarctic Circumpolar Current (ACC) and Pacific-Antarctic Ridge bathymetry, and to the south by the Antarctic Slope Current (ASC) and the Antarctic continental shelf. The gyre is located between 160°E and 140°W with a variable eastern boundary associated with the eastern extension of the Pacific-Antarctic Ridge. The Ross Gyre is bounded to the west by the presence of another gyre, the Balleny Gyre, associated with the Balleny fracture zone. The northeast boundary of the Ross Gyre expands and contracts semiannually due to reduced sea surface height (SSH) north of the gyre following deepening of the Amundsen Sea Low (ASL) to the east. The gyre is largest in area in May and November, and lowest following winter and in summer. The center of the gyre is located between 164°W, 68°S, and 150°W, 63°S, depending on 100/500m or 1500/3000m steric anomaly height maps, respectively.

=== Formation processes ===
Physical formation processes for the Ross Gyre remain unclear and difficult to study, but current theories attribute wind forcing and zonal momentum conservation balanced by vorticity gradients and bottom frictional forces to its formation. Prevailing polar westerlies create an eastern flowing ACC that is balanced by the topography of the seafloor that drives this formation. The eastern boundary is closely linked to where the ACC crosses the Pacific-Antarctic Ridge, at the Udintsev fracture zone, with a southward deflection to conserve vorticity. Near the shelf, the gyre circulates westward following the westward flow of the Antarctic Slope Current. Other theories attributing blocked geostrophic flows on a western landmass to Southern Ocean gyre formation have been challenged, as the Ross Gyre forms without any geostrophic contours being blocked. However, modeling simulations underline the importance of the northern ridge system in strengthening subpolar gyre circulation and shaping the stratification of the region.

=== Heat exchange ===
The Ross Gyre plays an important role in exchanging polar water masses and heat in Antarctica, connecting the ACC to the Antarctic shelf. The undefined eastern boundary of the gyre entrains relatively warm Circumpolar Deep Water (CDW) that is transferred to the continental shelf and the Bellingshausen and Amundsen Seas, which can affect sea ice melting rates and shelf ice extent. Eddy formation through gaps in the Pacific-Antarctic Ridge are hypothesized to facilitate this transport between the Antarctic Circumpolar Current and the Ross Gyre. The western limb of the gyre mediates the transfer of cold meltwater and newly formed Antarctic Bottom Water (AABW) originating in the Ross Sea northward. The presence of cold surface waters and warmer intermediate waters forms a double diffusive staircase within the Ross Gyre; this feature limits vertical heat exchange, and allows the development of ice in the gyre's center. It is estimated that the circulation of the Ross Gyre exports 20 ± 5 Sverdrup.

== Biogeochemical properties ==
At 500 meters deep, the surface water density in the Ross Gyre is higher than the surface water density measured at the Amundsen Seas, which is located to the east of the Ross gyre, during summer and winter because the Ross Gyre has a higher salinity at the surface than the Amundsen Seas. An explanation for these salinities is the addition of more meltwater in the Amundsen sea coming from the coastal shelf than in the Ross Gyre. Salinity has been recorded to be decreasing in the 40 years in the gyre as a result of the melting of ice shelves and the addition of fresh water. The change in salinity is the same as adding 18 mm of freshwater to the surface of the gyre. The southern area of the Ross Gyre has the strongest changes in salinity recorded. As the Ross Gyre is fairly remote, the biogeochemistry of this region is relatively under sampled. Recently, Argo floats, autonomous drifting and profiling platforms with various biogeochemical sensors including temperature, salinity, and nutrients, have been used to increase sampling effort. Argo floats deployed in the Ross Gyre have also measured temperatures of −1.0 – +2.5 °C ± 1 °C, salinity of 33.8–34.6 PSU ± 0.2 PSU, and nitrate concentrations of 26–32 μmol/kg ± 1 μmol/kg.

The concentrations of nutrients and carbon measured in the Ross Gyre vary by season due to processes like seasonal primary production and ice melt. During the austral summer and the austral winter, partial pressure of carbon dioxide (pCO_{2}), Nitrate [NO^{−}_{3}], and Phosphate [PO^{3−}_{4}], total carbon dioxide (TCO_{2}), total alkalinity (TALK), and Silicate [SiO^{2−}_{3}] vary in the concentrations measured in the gyre. During the austral summer, which refers to the months of December through February, the concentrations of pCO_{2} has been measured to be in the range of 330–510 μatm, NO^{−}_{3} of 24–31.5 μmol/kg, PO^{3−}_{4} of 1.6–2.3 μmol/kg, TCO_{2} of 2150–2250 μmol/kg, SiO^{2−}_{3} of 50–100 μmol/kg. During the austral winter, which refers to the months June through August, the concentrations of pCO_{2} has been measured to be in the range of 525–560 μatm, NO^{−}_{3} of 30–32 μmol/kg, PO^{3−}_{4} of 2.1–2.3 μmol/kg, TCO_{2} of 2210–2260 μmol/kg, SiO^{2−}_{3} of 70–105 μmol/kg.

A cruise navigating the Ross Gyre during the austral summer found that the ratio of silicate/net community production (NCP) was 0.66 ± 0.02 at the north area of the Ross Gyre, which scientists explained is due to modified circumpolar deep water (MCDW). In this cruise, this ratio of silicate/net community productivity compares the concentration of silicate to the amount of carbon. This ratio is higher than ratios from previous years and this annual variability could be due to changes in the concentrations of nutrients and/or diatom blooms, because the cell walls of diatoms are composed of silica.

== Ecological importance ==
The Ross Gyre hosts a wide spectrum of species and ecological interactions. Its waters contribute to the life cycle of the economically valued Antarctic toothfish (Dissostichus mawsoni), commonly marketed as Chilean seabass, and at least eight species of seabirds have been recorded in the region. With the southern point of the Ross Gyre bordering the Ross Sea, it also plays an indirect role in the Adélie penguin (Pygoscelis adeliae) feeding grounds by controlling ice extension. Orca Type C whales have also been recorded through satellite tracking on the Antarctic Slope, extending far beyond the Ross Sea and into the Ross Gyre. Historical data also provides insight into plankton abundance in the region.

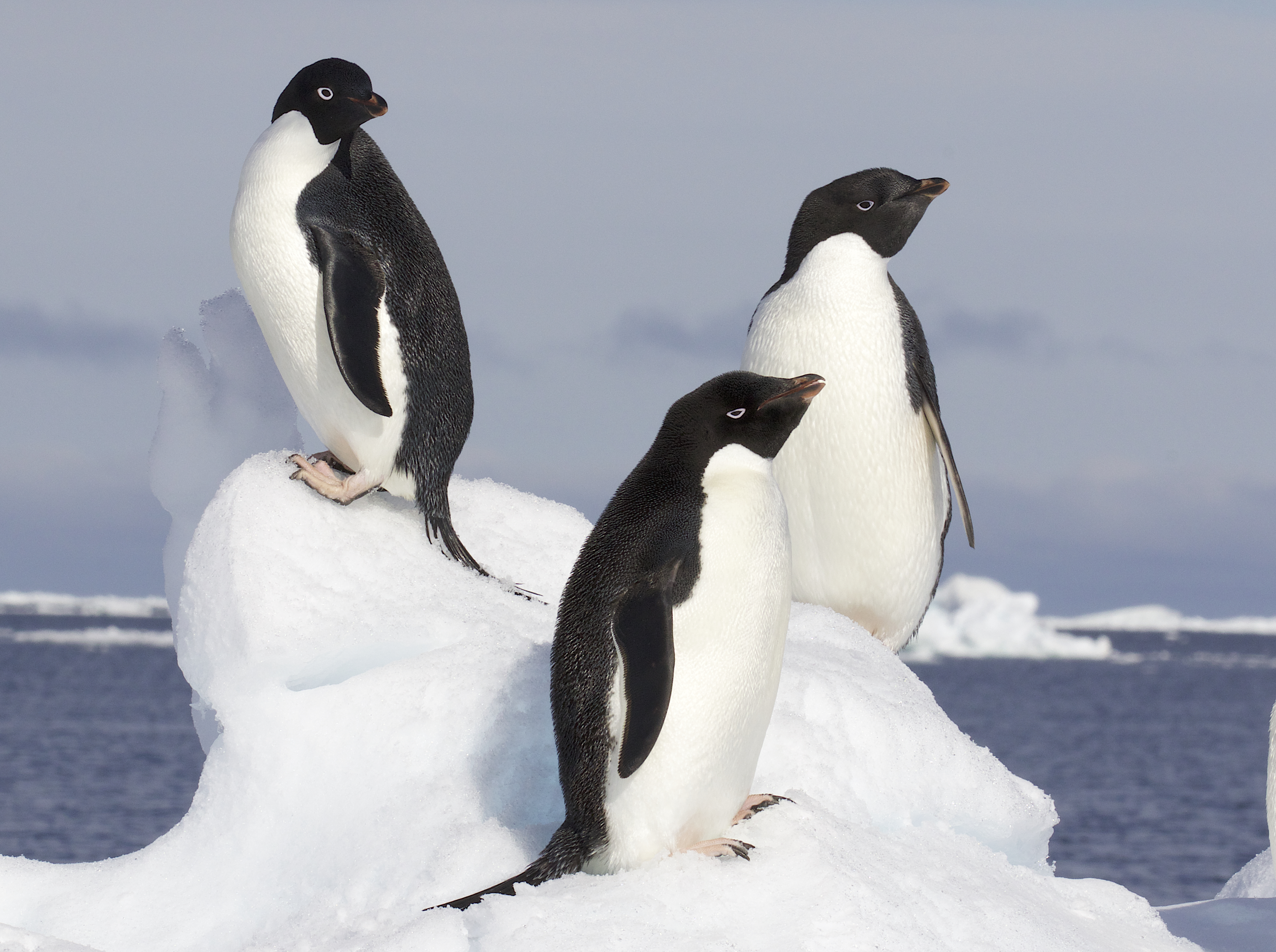
Adélie Penguin

=== Seabird biodiversity ===
Seabirds are part of the upper trophic levels of the ocean food web. A study in 2018 showed that two main species were the most commonly observed in the Ross Gyre: the Slender-billed prion and the Mottled petrel. While both species are pelagic, the former heavily relies on a plankton rich diet.

Adélie penguins have been observed in the Antarctic and Ross Gyre regions. A study in 2019 showed Adélie penguins increased their foraging efforts by traveling beyond the Ross Sea Marine Protected Area during their sub-adult phase and non-breeding season. Slower velocities of the Ross Gyre are related to Iceberg-affected years in the Ross Sea, which can significantly impact the Adélie penguin breeding season.

Slender-billed prion, mottled petrels, and Adelie penguins all demonstrate a preference towards very cold waters, making the Antarctic current bordering the Ross Gyre a biogeographical boundary in the region.

Distribution of bird species by latitude also indicates the presence of the following species in the Ross Gyre: cape petrel (Daption capense), white-faced storm petrel (Pelagodroma marina), Royal Albatross (Diomedea epomophora), Salvin's Albatross (Thalassarche salvini), and sooty shearwater (Ardenna grisea).

=== Antarctic toothfish population ===
The Antarctic toothfish (D. mawsoni) plays an essential role in the Ross Gyre's food web, where it is a predator to other invertebrates and also part of the diet of the Weddell seal. The Antarctic toothfish has also become an important commercially harvested fish, especially around the Ross Sea. Adult individuals have been recorded as far north as 55°S and 57°S in the Ross Gyre.

Juvenile toothfish dispersal has been linked to sea ice drift from the Ross Gyre, where the increase in sea ice drift leads to a decrease in recruitment success. A study by the National Institute of Water and Atmospheric Research in New Zealand found that the ice drift influenced by the Ross Gyre can determine the recruitment success of healthy juveniles. Simulations based on oceanographic data indicate that juvenile toothfish initial advantage of following ice drift diminishes as they grow. At their early life stages, sea ice provides food and shelter from predators. This however, is not the case for their second winter season. Modeled results showed that juveniles that continue to follow the ice drift by the Northern and Eastern Ross Gyre during their second winter season, instead of following the ocean currents, can result in a 70% decrease of recruitment success.

=== Plankton diversity ===
Historical data from the KRILL-DATABASE project, from 1926 up to 2016, shows the presence of both Antarctic krill (Euphausia superba) and the planktonic tunicate Salpidae along the Polar Front, which accounts for the northern boundary of the Ross Gyre. Classified as a middle trophic organism in the ecosystem's food web, Antarctic krill serves as food for multiple seabird species, including Adélie penguins, while also commercially harvested through multiple fisheries in the Southern Ocean.

== Climate change predictions ==
=== Predictions ===
Physical climate models suggest that with climate warming, the Ross Gyre cyclonic circulation will be intensified due to input from sea ice melt; causing waters from the Ross Gyre to expand into the Amundsen and Bellingshausen Seas. Predictions suggest that by the 2050s, the intensification of the Ross Gyre would also enhance the intrusion of warm Circumpolar Deep Water (CDW) towards the Antarctica west shelf, further increasing the loss of the Antarctic ice sheets. Observational records from 1957 to 2020 have shown a near-linear decrease in salinity of 0.170 PSU in the Ross Sea due to temperature-induced warming in the West Antarctica ice sheet. Melting of the ice sheet and freshening of the Ross Gyre is predicted to slow down deep water formation in the Southern Ocean, which threatens to slow global thermohaline circulation.

=== Anthropogenic carbon sequestration ===
Studies has explored the role of the Ross Gyre in carbon uptake by enhancing biological pump though ocean iron fertilization (OIF) experiments. Models predict this using simulated particulate organic carbon (POC) and Lagrangian particle tracking. It has been found that the clockwise circulation of the Ross Gyre facilitates the concentration of particles within the gyre, offering high potential for carbon sequestration.

=== Southern Oscillation and sea surface height ===
Ross Gyre Sea Surface Height (SSH) is subject to interannual variability influenced by the El Niño-Southern Oscillation (El Niño and La Niña). During the extreme El Niño event in 2015–2016, the SSH was observed to decrease by 6 cm, weakening the Antarctic Slope Current (ASC), which controls Ekman Transport. La Niña plays a role in transporting heat to the ice shelf on the Amundsen Sea.

The Ross Gyre SSH also varies seasonally. During autumn, coastal sea level and Ross Gyre SSH are the highest, while SSH is lowest during summer.

The Southern Annular Mode (SAM) describes the north–south movement of the prevailing winds in the Southern Ocean. The positive index describes the strengthening of the westerly winds, while the negative index describes the weakening. SAM is associated with ice drift and ice extent. With climate warming, positive SAM is predicted to persist over the 21st century in the Antarctic coastal currents, strengthening the upward movement of subsurface warm waters to the coast and facilitating the rapid melting of the Antarctic ice sheet.

== Research limitations ==
The Southern Ocean, despite its critical role in climate regulation, oceanic processes, and carbon sequestration; remains under-researched. Acquiring in-situ ship based measurements on research vessels is costly and challenging due to harsh weather conditions and ice coverage during winter. Oceanographic research in these remote regions is aided by autonomous monitoring devices, such as Argo Floats, which can constantly measure the ocean's biological, physical, and chemical properties. Ice cover remains an essential challenge for data acquisition. Before 2007, 40% of Argo floats deployed in the Southern Ocean had been destroyed and lost, mainly due to ice crashes. Survival days have improved though the use of new technology for the floats. This include temperature sensors that detect the presence of ice, allowing the instrument to communicate, avoid its ascend to the surface, store the data, and continue measurements during its descent. Other ways to make observations are using radar satellite altimetry for ice cover and SSH measurements.

== See also ==
- Oceanic current
- Physical oceanography
- Weddell Gyre
