= Weddell Gyre =

One of two gyres within the Southern Ocean

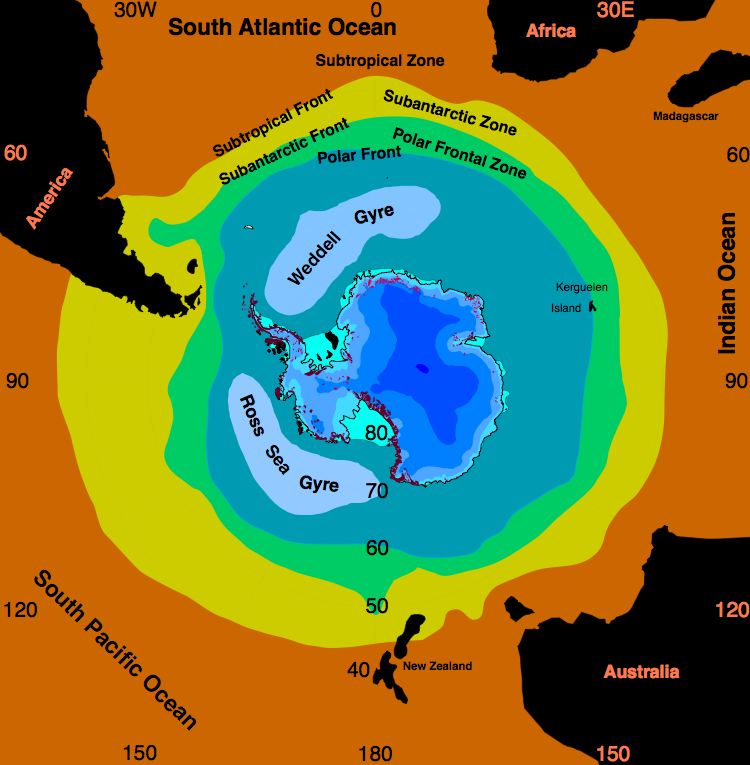
Location of the Weddell Gyre in the Weddell Sea.

The Weddell Gyre is one of the two gyres that exist within the Southern Ocean. The gyre is formed by interactions between the Antarctic Circumpolar Current (ACC) and the Antarctic Continental Shelf. The gyre is located in the Weddell Sea, and rotates clockwise. South of the ACC and spreading northeast from the Antarctic Peninsula, the gyre is an extended large cyclone. Where the northeastern end ends at 30°E, which is marked by the southward turn of the ACC, the northern part of the gyre spreads over the Southern Scotia Sea and goes northward to the South Sandwich Arc. Axis of the gyre is over the southern flanks of the South Scotia, America-Antarctic, and Southwest Indian Ridges. In the southern part of the gyre, the westward return flow is about 66 sverdrup (Sv), while in the northern rim current, there is an eastward flow of 61 Sv.

== Physical oceanography ==
Due to the Coriolis force acting to the left in the Southern Hemisphere and the resulting Ekman transport away from the centers of the gyre, these regions are very productive due to upwelling of cold, nutrient rich water. Strong upwelling in the gyre is shown where the deep-water isotherms curve upwards. The Weddell front, which is identical to the Southern Antarctic Circumpolar Current Front, separates the Weddell gyre from the Antarctic Circumpolar Current. The flow is cyclonic, although the cavity flow is anticyclonic. This is because the new dense shelf ocean waters come in from the west, then modify under the Ronne Ice Shelf, then evolving in the east with colder and fresher water. The Weddell Sea Bottom Water gets its dense shelf water from the outflow of the east from under the Filchner Ice Shelf.

In the northern part of the gyre, shelf water influence is traced continuously at 22°E from the top of the Antarctic Peninsula. To the north of the gyre, the ridge system confines the Weddell Sea Bottom Water formation in the western continental margins with the Weddell Abyssal Plain. Some of the bottom water spreads through a gap to fill the South Sandwich Trench. Because of upwelling the new Weddell Sea Bottom Water turns clockwise west of 20°W and are a mixture of shelf water and a part of the Circumpolar Deep Water that follows the southern part of the gyre to the west. East, another part of the Circumpolar Deep Water mixes with shelf water and may establish a particular source of Weddell Sea Deep Water.

In the Weddell Sea Deep Water, there is a 2 gyre cyclonic system inferred and is able to spill over the South Scotia Ridge. Overlying circumpolar Deep Water of Antarctic Circumpolar Current and the Weddell Sea Deep Water mix and can be traced back to the Weddell Abyssal Plain revealing the western gyre. Geographically speaking, the Antarctic Peninsula contains the western end of the gyre. In these bottom and deep layers of the gyre, it is completed by a southward movement. where the currents at the bottom of the gyre flow in an opposite direction than the water column above.

At the eastern and western sides of the basin, the transect circulation pattern is controlled by stable boundary currents, which are warm, deep, narrow and fast flowing currents forming on either the east or west side of ocean basins. These currents are several hundred kilometers in width and provide 90% of volume transport of the gyre. This equals out to 29.5 Sv. The intensity of the boundary currents are controlled by the seasonal fluctuations, but the time-scale, days to weeks dominates the interior. The Antarctic divergence is the boundary region between the east and west winds. This location is between 65 and 70°S.

== See also ==
- Oceanic current
- Physical oceanography
- Ross Gyre
- Antarctica
