= Antarctic continental shelf =

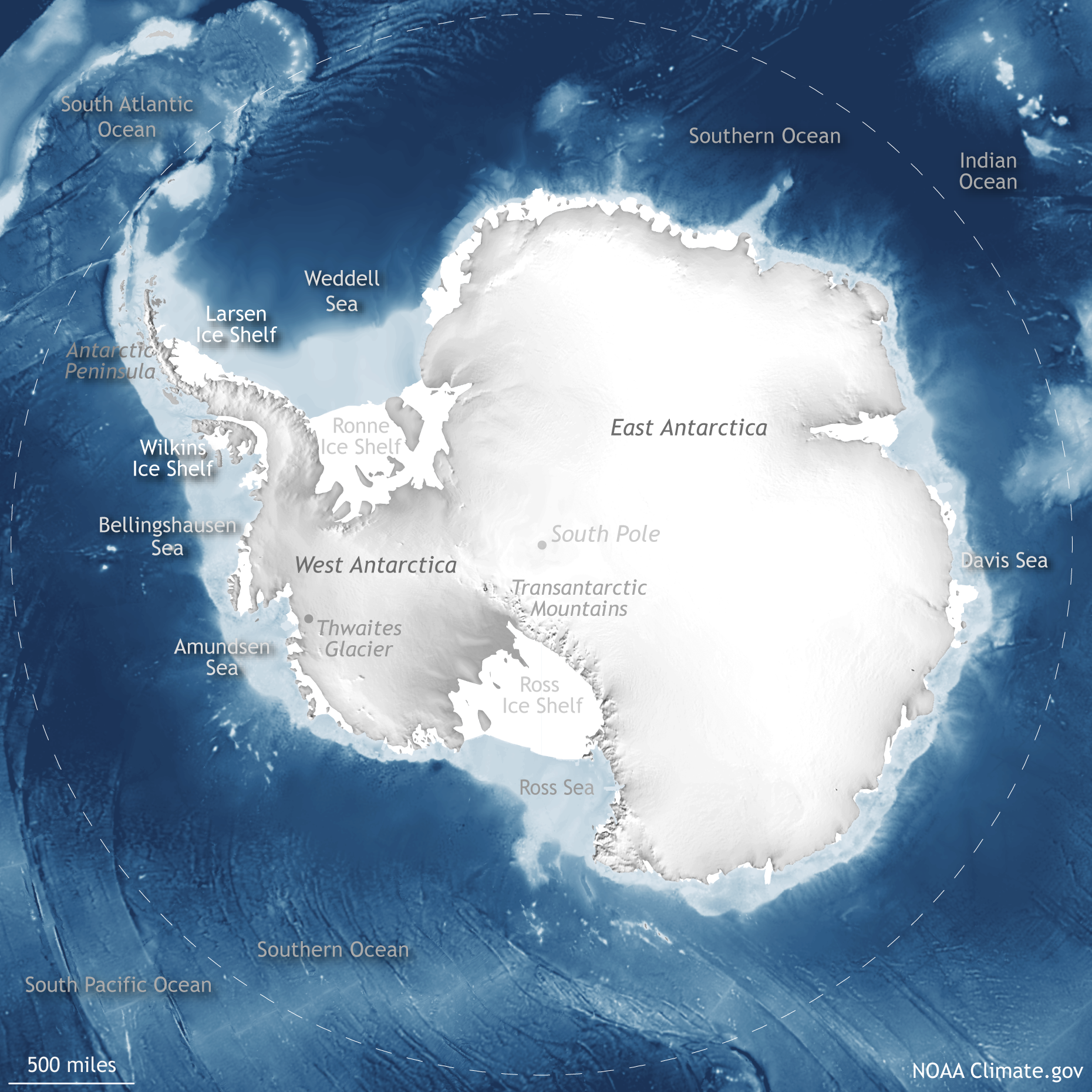
Antarctica, including the Antarctic continental shelf

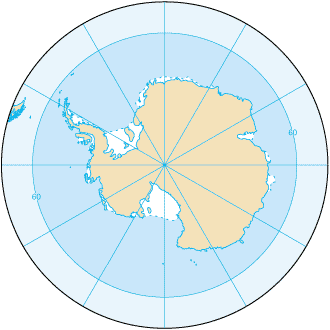
Antarctica is located in the Southern Hemisphere, surrounded by the Southern Ocean.

The Antarctic continental shelf is a submerged piece of the Antarctic continent that underlies a portion of the Southern Ocean — the ocean which surrounds Antarctica. The shelf is generally narrow and unusually deep, its edge lying at depths averaging 500 meters (the global mean is around 100 meters), with troughs extending as far as 2000 meters deep. It plays a role in biogeochemical cycling, maintaining global climate, and the overall functioning of its ecosystem After being formed, the Antarctic continental shelf has been further deepened by the processes of thermal subsidence, ice sheet loading, and erosion over the past 34 million years.

== Functions ==
The Antarctic continental shelf is involved in global climate regulation and temperature stability through the overturning of water masses, where heat is circulated throughout the ocean. When ice forms, it results in brine rejection, where salt is expelled and dense water forms along the continental shelf. This cold and salty water is referred to Antarctic Bottom Water, which sinks to the deep ocean because of its high density. Furthermore, the Antarctic continental shelf serves as a source for sedimentary iron, essential for primary productivity in phytoplankton, for the Southern Ocean.

== Formation ==
Although the Antarctic continental shelf was developed through the process of plate tectonics, there were other process acting upon it which resulted in its significant deepness in comparison to other continental shelves around the world. For one, it was further shaped by thermal subsidence- put simply, the process by which the Earth's crust sinks. Additionally, the continental shelf was deepened by ice sheet loading where pressure from the ice mass causes the landmass to submerge. Its unusual bathymetry is also a result of long-term erosion caused by repeated glaciations from extreme climate changes over the past 34 million years.

== Life ==
In the Antarctic continental shelf, including under the Antarctic ice sheet, there are many invertebrate life-forms such as worms, mollusks, sea spiders, sea stars and sea cucumbers. Other animals like fish, jellyfish, and krill are also found in this ecosystem. Fossils suggest that life has existed under the ice shelf for a continuous 6000 years.

== Relationship with AIS ==
The distance from the Antarctic continental shelf to the AIS ranges from tens to hundreds of kilometers. Nevertheless, it has been shown that there is an amplification in the impact made on the AIS given changes in the Antarctic continental shelf. For example, increasing AIS volume directly increases Antarctic continental shelf erosion. This is known as glacial erosion. Increased erosion of the continental shelf makes the AIS more sensitive to ocean forcing — the sum of forces that amplify the ocean's ability to affect climate and surface conditions. Inversely, the Antarctic continental shelf has an impact on the AIS. When the flow of warm water from ocean circulation reaches the Antarctic continental shelf, it gets rapidly converted to the denser and colder water at the shelf, limiting the heat contact on the AIS. In this way, it limits the AIS ice melt.

== Bathymetry mapping ==
Due to its remote location, the Antarctic continental shelf is poorly mapped. A variety of methods have been used to map the bathymetry of the Antarctic continental shelf some including: seal dives, multi-beam echo sounder survey, and sea gliders. Tagged benthic feeding seals with satellite transmitters have been used as means to improve bathymetric surveyings. This data revealed some bathymetric features including the deep canyons and troughs. Additionally, the bathymetry of the Antarctic continental shelf has been assessed using sea gliders where satellites and sensors are used to measure depth. Finally, another technology used as means of mapping is the multi-beam echo sounder survey. This sends out sound beams to measure seafloor depth by the intensity of the echo reflected back.
