= Floating island of garbage =

Floating island of garbage or island of floating trash, could refer to:

- Garbage patch, a collection of floating detritus formed from trash coming together in a mass in the ocean becoming like an island
  - Great Pacific Garbage Patch
- Thilafushi (Dhivehi: ތިލަފުށި), Maldives; an artificial island created as a landfill trash dump; so referred to.
- A statement made by American comedian Tony Hinchcliffe at the 2024 Donald Trump rally at Madison Square Garden about Puerto Rico

== See also ==
- Floating island
- Floating cities and islands in fiction
- Garbage Island
- Trash Island
