= Garbage Island =

Garbage Island may refer to:

- Garbage patch ocean debris pollution
  - Great Pacific Garbage Patch
- Thilafushi (Dhivehi: ތިލަފުށި), Maldives; an artificial island created as a landfill trash dump; so referred to as "Garbage Island"
- Garbage Island, a former nickname for Taiwan due to excessive industrial waste; see Waste management in Taiwan and Geography of Taiwan
- "Garbage Island" (How I Met Your Mother), a 2011 TV episode
- Garbage Island, an online animated TV series produced by icebox.com
- Garbage Island, a fictional location found in the TV anime show Hatsumei Boy Kanipan
- Garbage Island, a fictional location found in the animated TV show Family Guy season 17
- Garbage Island, a fictional location found in the animated TV show Star vs. the Forces of Evil; see List of Star vs. the Forces of Evil episodes

== See also ==
- "Toxic Garbage Island", a song by Gojira on their 2008 album The Way of All Flesh
- Floating island of garbage
- Trash Island
