= Trash Island =

Trash Island may refer to:

- Garbage patch, a collection of floating detritus formed from trash coming together in a mass in the ocean becoming like an island
  - Great Pacific Garbage Patch
- Thilafushi (Dhivehi: ތިލަފުށި), Maldives; an artificial island created as a landfill trash dump; so referred to as "Trash Island"
- Trash Island (album), a 2019 album by Drain Gang
- Trash Island, a record label founded by Bladee in 2018
- Trash Island, a fictional location from the 2013 film Isle of Dogs (film)

== See also ==
- floating island of garbage
- Garbage Island
