= Indian Ocean garbage patch =

Gyre of marine litter in the Indian Ocean

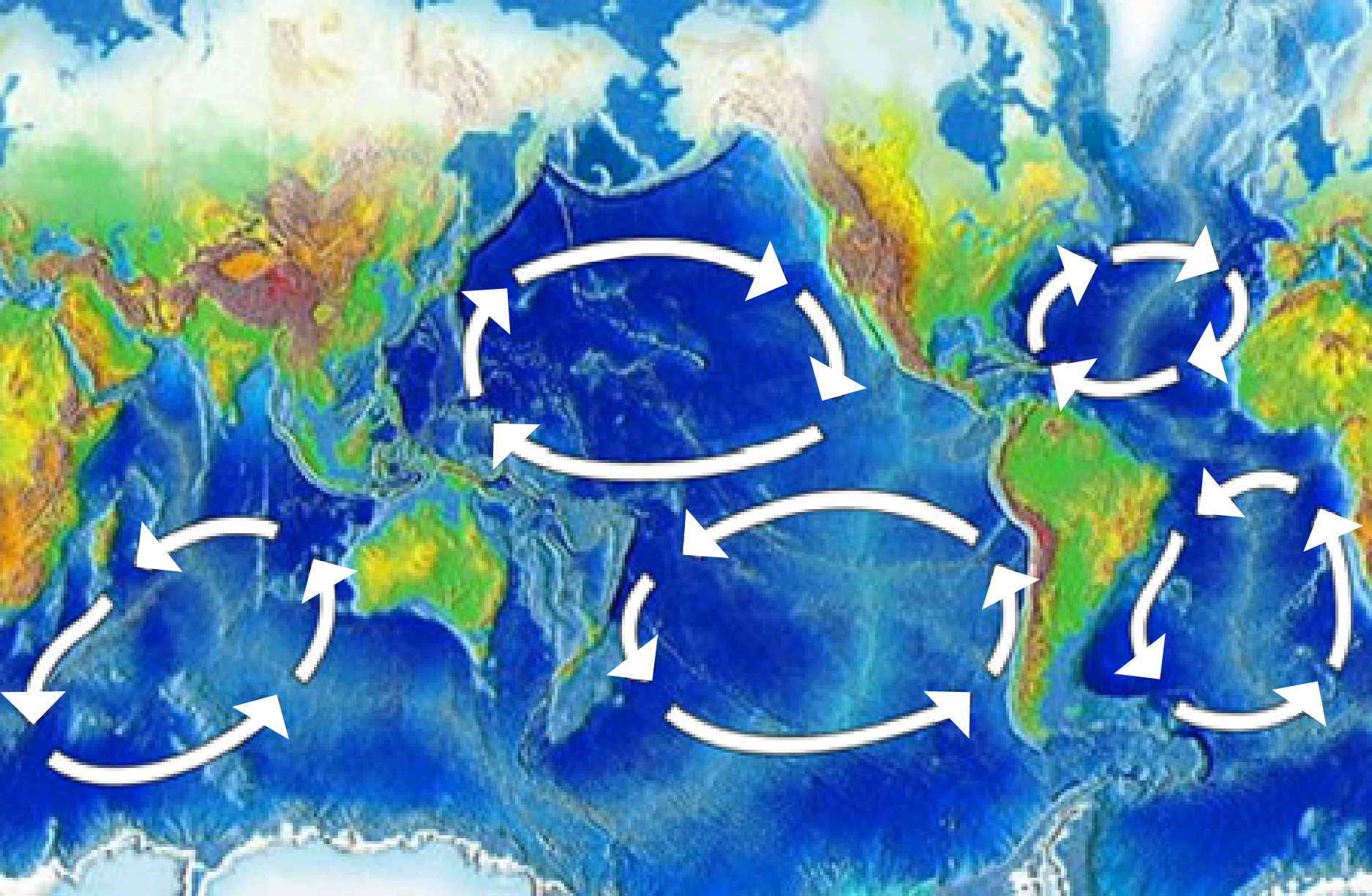
There are trash vortices in each of the five major oceanic gyres

The Indian Ocean Garbage Patch on a continuous ocean map centered near the south pole

The Indian Ocean garbage patch, discovered in 2010, is a marine garbage patch, a gyre of marine litter, suspended in the upper water column of the central Indian Ocean, specifically the Indian Ocean Gyre, one of the five major oceanic gyres. The patch does not appear as a continuous debris field. As with other patches in each of the five oceanic gyres, the plastics in it break down to ever smaller particles, and to constituent polymers. As with the other patches, the field constitutes an elevated level of pelagic plastics, chemical sludge, and other debris; primarily particles that are invisible to the naked eye. The concentration of particle debris has been estimated to be approximately 10,000 particles per square kilometer.

== Discovery ==
The existence of the Great Pacific Garbage Patch, the first to be discovered, was predicted in a 1988 paper published by the National Oceanic and Atmospheric Administration (NOAA) of the United States. The prediction was based on results obtained by several Alaska-based researchers between 1985 and 1988 that measured neustonic plastic in the North Pacific Ocean.

Research studying trash washed onto beaches in and around the Indian Ocean suggested that there would be plastics found in the water column in the Indian Ocean as well.

As plastic items of neutral and positive buoyancy pile up in this infamous garbage patch, researchers and scientists have difficulty pinpointing their location due to treacherous currents. For example, litter collected from Asia on both the western Indian Ocean islands and the eastern African coast send plastic pollution across the Indian Ocean via the South Equatorial Current. Although the Indian Ocean Garbage Patch collects mounds of plastic, harming marine life, researchers and scientists have also discovered two more garbage patches: the South Pacific Ocean Garbage Patch and the North Atlantic. Unfortunately, about 90% of the debris collected in these garbage patches is plastic, a detrimental threat to marine life's health. Plastic debris collects and washes ashore, thereby affecting living creatures' health. Due to strong currents, plastic debris washes ashore in various locations, diminishing environmental prosperity and harming living organisms.

In 2010, the 5 Gyres Project set off on the first of its planned series of transoceanic voyages to determine whether the South Atlantic, South Pacific, and Indian Ocean gyres were affected in the same way as the North Pacific and North Atlantic gyres. On the Indian Ocean leg of their trip, they travelled between Perth, Australia, and Port Louis, Mauritius (east of Madagascar); each of the water samples they collected in the 4,800 km (3,000 mi) between contained plastic. They found that the South Atlantic, South Pacific, and Indian Ocean gyres were affected in the same way as the North Pacific and North Atlantic gyres. Anna Cummins, cofounder of 5 Gyres Institute called the pollution they found "a thin plastic soup".

== Sources ==
Of the top 10 ocean plastic polluters (of which China is No.1 worldwide with 30%), the Indian Ocean features five: Indonesia (No. 2); Sri Lanka (No.5); Thailand (No. 6); Malaysia (No. 8), and Bangladesh (No. 10).

Ten rivers carry 90% of the total plastic pollution in the oceans. Of these, two are in the Indian Ocean: the Indus (No. 2 worldwide with most plastic) and Ganges (No. 6).

== Action for creating awareness ==
On April 11, 2013, in order to create awareness, artist Maria Cristina Finucci founded the garbage patch state at UNESCO – Paris, in front of Director General Irina Bokova, the first of a series of events under the patronage of UNESCO and of Italian Ministry of the Environment.

== See also ==
- Great Pacific Garbage Patch
- North Atlantic garbage patch
- Plastisphere
