= North Atlantic Gyre =

Major circular system of ocean currents

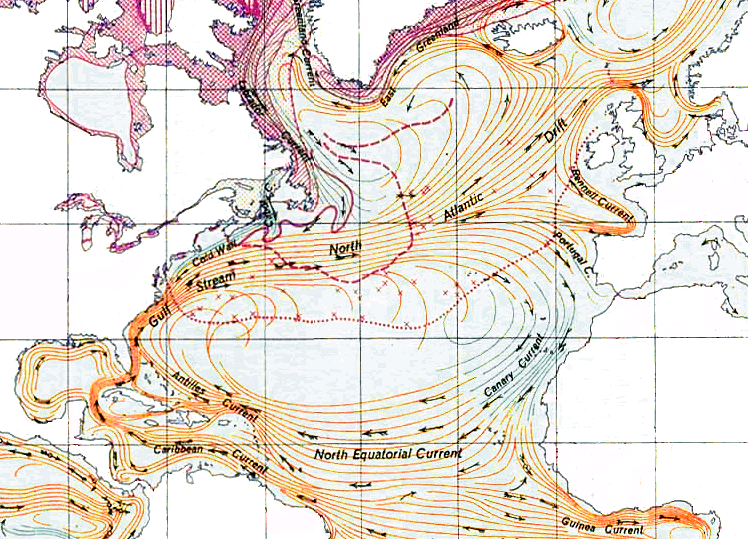
View of the currents surrounding the gyre.

The North Atlantic Gyre of the Atlantic Ocean is one of five great oceanic gyres. It is a circular ocean current, with offshoot eddies and sub-gyres, across the North Atlantic from the Intertropical Convergence Zone (calms or doldrums) to the part south of Iceland, and from the east coasts of North America to the west coasts of Europe and Africa.

In turn it is chiefly subdivided into the Gulf Stream flowing northward along the west; its often conflated continuation, the North Atlantic Current across the north; the Canary Current flowing southward along the east; and the Atlantic's North Equatorial Current in the south. The gyre has a pronounced thermohaline circulation, bringing salty water west from the Mediterranean Sea and then north to form the North Atlantic Deep Water.

The gyre traps anthropogenic (human-made) marine debris in its natural garbage or flotsam patch, in the same way the North Pacific Gyre has the Great Pacific Garbage Patch.

At the heart of the gyre is the Sargasso Sea, noted for its still waters and quite dense seaweed accumulations.

== Structure ==
Low air temperatures at high latitudes cause substantial sea-air heat flux, driving a density increase and convection in the water column. Open ocean convection occurs in deep plumes and is particularly strong in winter when the sea-air temperature difference is largest. Of the 6 sverdrup (Sv) of dense water that flows southward over the GSR (Greenland-Scotland Ridge), 3 Sv does so via the Denmark Strait forming Denmark Strait Overflow Water (DSOW). 0.5-1 Sv flows over the Iceland-Faroe ridge and the remaining 2–2.5 Sv returns through the Faroe-Shetland Channel; these two flows form Iceland Scotland Overflow Water (ISOW). The majority of flow over the Faroe-Shetland ridge flows through the Faroe-Bank Channel and soon joins that which flowed over the Iceland-Faroe ridge, to flow southward at depth along the Eastern flank of the Reykjanes Ridge.

As ISOW overflows the GSR (Greenland-Scotland Ridge), it turbulently entrains intermediate density waters such as Sub-Polar Mode water and Labrador Sea Water. This grouping of water-masses then moves geostrophically southward along the East flank of Reykjanes Ridge, through the Charlie Gibbs Fracture Zone and then northward to join DSOW. These waters are sometimes referred to as Nordic Seas Overflow Water (NSOW). NSOW flows cyclonically following the surface route of the SPG (sub-polar gyre) around the Labrador Sea and further entrains Labrador Sea Water (LSW).

Characteristically fresh Labrador Sea Water (LSW) is formed at intermediate depths by deep convection in the central Labrador Sea, particularly during winter storms. This convection is not deep enough to penetrate into the NSOW layer which forms the deep waters of the Labrador Sea. LSW joins NSOW to move southward out of the Labrador Sea: while NSOW easily passes under the NAC at the North-West Corner, some LSW is retained. This diversion and retention by the SPG explains its presence and entrainment near the GSR (Greenland-Scotland Ridge) overflows. Most of the diverted LSW however splits off before the CGFZ (Charlie-Gibbs Fracture Zone) and remains in the western SPG. LSW production is highly dependent on sea-air heat flux and yearly production typically ranges from 3–9 Sv. ISOW is produced in proportion to the density gradient across the Iceland-Scotland Ridge and as such is sensitive to LSW production which affects the downstream density More indirectly, increased LSW production is associated with a strengthened SPG and hypothesized to be anti-correlated with ISOW This interplay confounds any simple extension of a reduction in individual overflow waters to a reduction in Atlantic meridional overturning circulation (AMOC). LSW production is understood to have been minimal prior to the 8.2 ka event, with the SPG thought to have existed before in a weakened, non-convective state.

There is a debate about the extent to which convection in the Labrador Sea plays a role in AMOC circulation, particularly in the connection between Labrador sea variability and AMOC variability. Observational studies have been inconclusive about whether this connection exists. New observations with the OSNAP array show little contribution from the Labrador Sea to overturning, and hydrographic observations from ships dating back to 1990 show similar results. Nevertheless, older estimates of LSW formation using different techniques suggest larger overturning.

== Seasonal variability ==
As with many oceanographic patterns, the North Atlantic Gyre experiences seasonal changes. Stramma and Siedler (1988) determined that the gyre expands and contracts with a seasonal variance; however, the magnitude of volume transport does not seem to change significantly. During the Northern Hemisphere winter season, the gyre follows a more zonal pattern; that is, it expands in the east-west direction and thins in the north-south direction. As the seasons move from winter to summer, the gyre shifts south by a few degrees latitude. This occurs concurrently with the displacement of the northeastern part of the gyre. It has been concluded that zonal deviations within the gyre remain small while north and south of the gyre they are large.

Data collected in the Sargasso Sea region in the western part of the North Atlantic Gyre has led to analytical evidence that the variability of this gyre is linked to wintertime convective mixing. According to Bates (2001), a seasonal variation of 8-10 °C in surface temperature occurs alongside a fluctuation in the mixed layer depth between the Northern Hemisphere winter and summer seasons. The depth rises from 200 meters in winter to about 10 meters in summer. Nutrients remain below the euphotic zone for most of the year, resulting in low primary production. Yet during winter convective mixing, nutrients penetrate the euphotic zone, causing a short-lived phytoplankton bloom in the spring. This then lifts the mixed-layer depth to 10 meters.

The changes in oceanic biology and vertical mixing between winter and summer in the North Atlantic Gyre seasonally alter the total amount of carbon dioxide in the seawater. Interannual trends have established that carbon dioxide concentrations within this gyre are increasing at a similar rate to that occurring in the atmosphere. This discovery concurs with that made in the North Pacific Gyre. The North Atlantic Gyre also undergoes temperature changes via atmospheric wave patterns. The North Atlantic Oscillation (NAO) is one such pattern. During its positive phase, the gyre warms. This is due to a weakening of the westerly winds, resulting in reduced wind stress and heat exchange, providing a greater period of time for the gyre water temperatures to rise.

== Lead contamination ==
Measured samples of aerosols, marine particles, and water in the gyre from 1990–92 include examining lead isotope ratios. Certain isotopes are hallmarks of pollution essentially from Europe and the near Middle East by trade winds; other contamination was primarily caused by American emissions. The surface layers of the Sargasso Sea were read for such concentrations. 42–57% of the contamination came from American industrial and automotive sources, despite the reduction in the production and use of leaded gasoline in the United States. Since 1992 lead has clearly reducing concentrations – this is theorised to hold true across the Atlantic in surface layers.

== Garbage patch ==
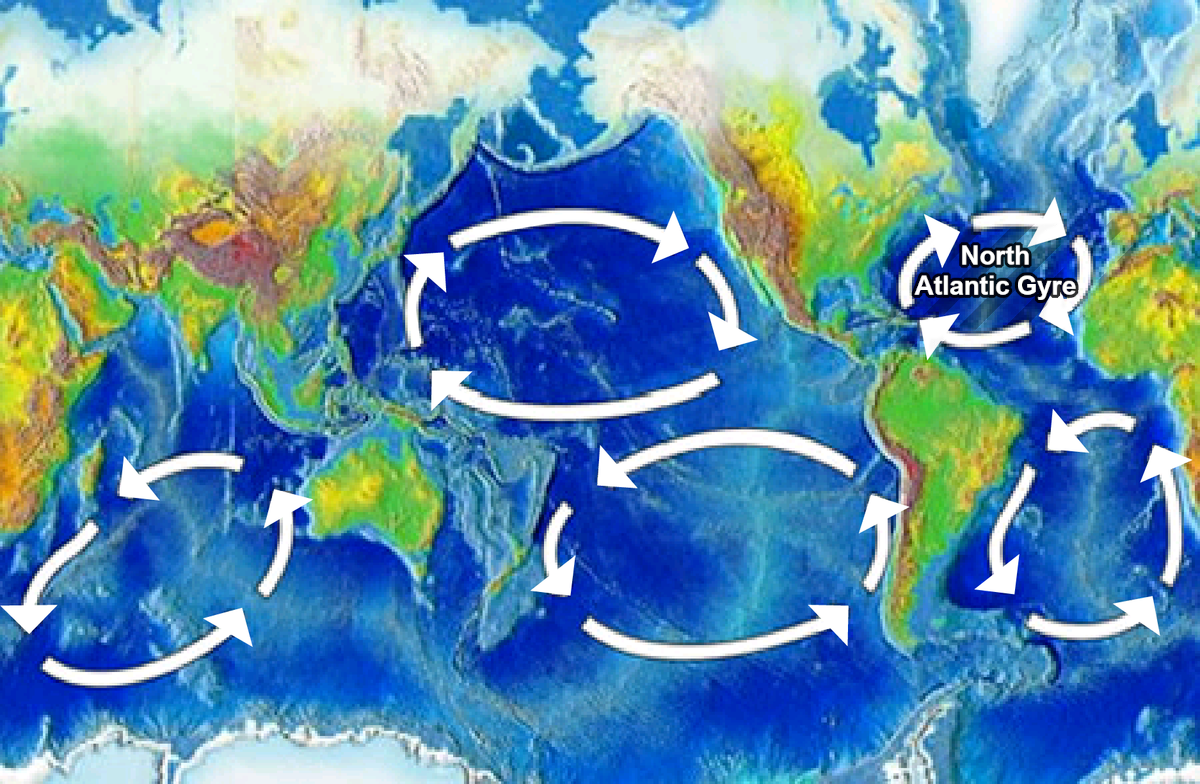
The North Atlantic Gyre is one of five major ocean gyres.

The North Atlantic garbage patch is a garbage patch of human-made marine debris found floating within the North Atlantic Gyre, originally documented in 1972. A 22-year research study conducted by the Sea Education Association estimates the patch to be hundreds of kilometers across, with a density of more than 200,000 pieces of debris per square kilometer. The garbage originates from human-created waste traveling from rivers into the ocean and mainly consists of microplastics. The garbage patch is a large risk to wildlife (and to humans) through plastic consumption and entanglement.

There have only been a few awareness and clean-up efforts for the North Atlantic garbage patch, such as the Garbage Patch State at UNESCO and the Ocean Cleanup, as most of the research and cleanup efforts have been focused on the Great Pacific Garbage Patch, a similar garbage patch in the north Pacific.

== See also ==
- Ocean current
- Oceanic gyre
- Volta do mar
