= South Pacific garbage patch =

Region of marine debris

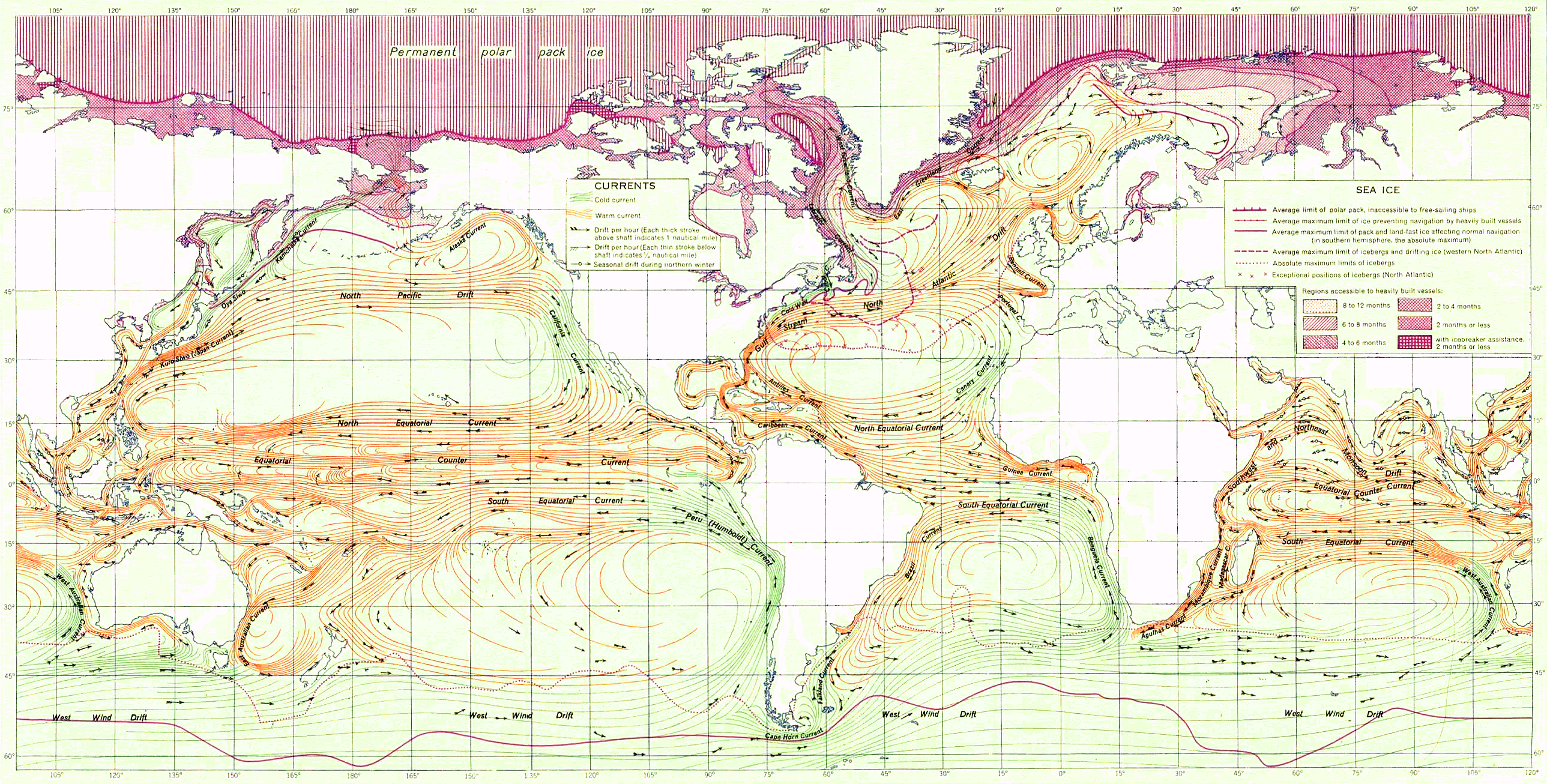
The South Pacific Gyre can be seen in the lack of oceanic currents off the west coast of South America. Map of ocean currents circa 1943

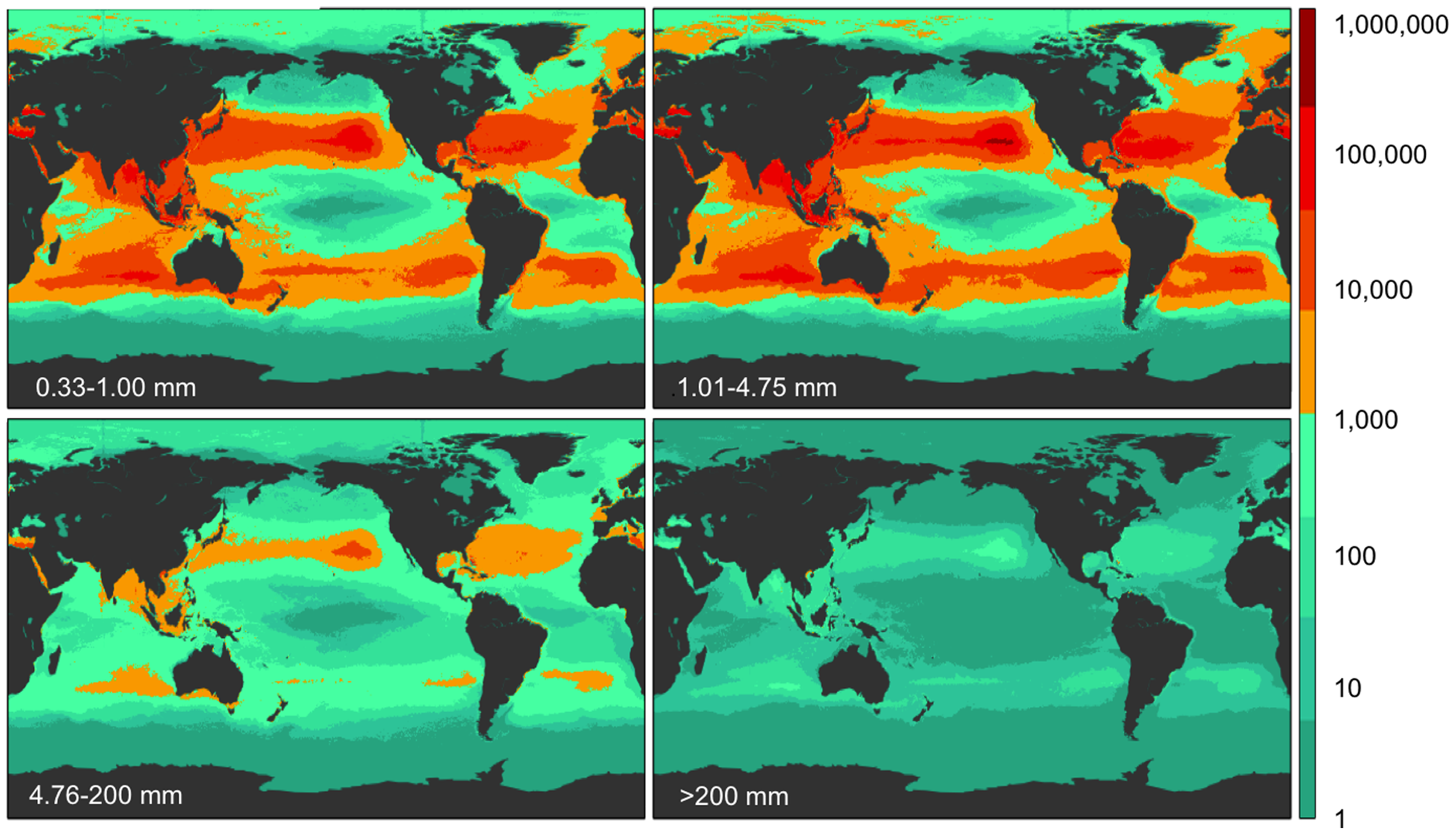
This photo demonstrates the dispersal of plastic fragments of various sizes

Visualization of the flow pattern of ocean pollutants

The South Pacific garbage patch is an area of ocean with increased levels of marine debris and plastic particle pollution, within the ocean's pelagic zone. This area is in the South Pacific Gyre, which itself spans from waters east of Australia to the South American continent, as far north as the Equator, and south until reaching the Antarctic Circumpolar Current. The degradation of plastics in the ocean also leads to a rise in the level of toxins in the area. The garbage patch was confirmed in mid-2017, and has been compared to the Great Pacific Garbage Patch's state in 2007, making the former ten years younger. The South Pacific garbage patch is not visible on satellites, and is not a landmass. Most particles are smaller than a grain of rice. A researcher said: "This cloud of microplastics extends both vertically and horizontally. It's more like smog than a patch".

== Discovery ==
Evidence pointing to the existence of a garbage patch in the South Pacific gyre was made in early 2011 and its existence was confirmed in mid-2017. The discovery was made after a research voyage made by the 5 Gyres Institute. The voyage ran from March to April 2011, following a route based on a model of ocean currents developed by Nikolia Maximenko of the University of Hawaii, which predicts floating debris accumulation zones. The expedition started taking samples off the coast of Robinson Crusoe Island, Chile, and began working its way west, collecting new samples every 50 nautical miles, reaching the waters off Easter Island, and eventually Pitcairn Island.

A second water sampling voyage departing from Long Beach, California on November 2, 2016, lasting six months, was led by Charles J. Moore, and a team of researchers from Algalita Marine Research and Education. Upon departure the vessel began its journey south along the Baja California peninsula and on to the Galapagos Islands, continuing southwest on to Easter Island. After departing Easter Island the crew then headed eastward to the Juan Fernandez Islands, after which it continued north following the coast of Chile, with stopping points at Antofagasta, Chile, and Arica, Chile, before heading further out to sea for its return journey to Long Beach.

== Composition, concentration and size ==
During the 5 Gyres expedition, 48 samples were taken from a 2,424 nautical sweep. The researchers found an increase in plastic pollution density, averaging 26,898 particles per square kilometer, but spiking at up to 396,342 particles per square kilometer, peaking near the center of the predicted accumulation zone, with some estimates as high as one million particles per square kilometer.

The composition of the garbage patch consists mainly of microbeads, tiny abrasives less than 5 micrometers in size usually found in certain personal hygiene products, microscopic fibers from washing clothes, fishing debris from southern hemisphere fishermen, and microscopic fragments of larger pieces which have been broken down in the ocean.

The elevated levels of pollutants can be detected over a vast area estimated to be 2.6 million square kilometers (one million square miles), or about 1.5 times the size of Texas, with the debris found along a nearly 2,500 nautical mile straight line route.

== See also ==
- South Atlantic Gyre
- Plastic pollution
