= Ecological crisis =

Change to the environment that destabilizes the continued survival of a population

An ecological or environmental crisis occurs when changes to the environment of a species or population destabilizes its continued survival. Some of the important causes include:

- Degradation of an abiotic ecological factor (for example, increase of temperature, less significant rainfalls)
- Increased pressures from predation
- Rise in the number of individuals (i.e. overpopulation)

The evolutionary theory of punctuated equilibrium sees infrequent ecological crises as a potential driver of rapid evolution.

Because of the impact of humans on the natural environment in the recent geological period, the term ecological crisis is often applied to environmental issues caused by human civilizations such as: the climate crisis, biodiversity loss and plastic pollution which have emerged as major global challenges during the first few decades of the 21st century.

== Examples ==
=== Crises caused by abiotic factors ===
Climate change is starting to have major impacts on ecosystems. With global temperature rising, there is a decrease in snow-fall, and sea levels are rising. Ecosystems will change or evolve to cope with the increase in temperature. Consequently, many species are being driven out of their habitats.

Polar bears are being threatened. They need ice for hunting seals, their primary prey. However, the ice caps are melting, making their hunting periods shorter each year. As a result, the polar bears are not developing enough fat for the winter; therefore, they are not able to reproduce at a healthy rate.

Fresh water and wetland ecosystems are dealing with extreme effects of the increase of temperature. The climate change could be devastating to salmon and trout and to other aquatic life. The increase in temperature will disrupt the current life patterns of the salmon and trout. The cold-water fish will eventually leave their natural geographical range to live in cooler waters by migrating to higher elevations.

While many species have been able to adapt to the new conditions by moving their range further towards the poles, other species are not as fortunate. The option to move is not available for polar bears and for some aquatic life.

==== Climate change ====
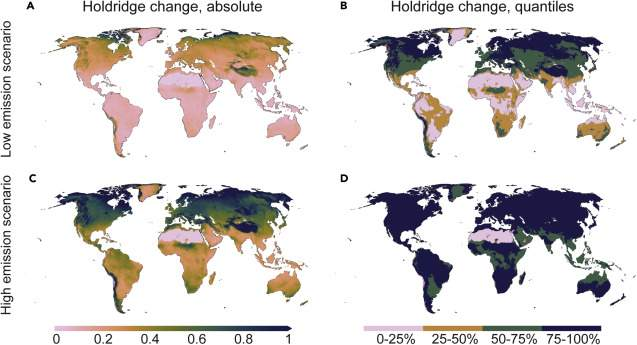
Predicted changes for Earth's biomes under two different climate change scenarios for 2081–2100. Top row is low emissions scenario, bottom row is high emissions scenario. Biomes are classified with Holdridge life zones system. A shift of 1 or 100% (darker colours) indicates that the region has fully moved into a completely different biome zone type.

Climate change is already now altering biomes, adversely affecting terrestrial and marine ecosystems. Climate change represents long-term changes in temperature and average weather patterns. This leads to a substantial increase in both the frequency and the intensity of extreme weather events. As a region's climate changes, a change in its flora and fauna follows. For instance, out of 4000 species analyzed by the IPCC Sixth Assessment Report, half were found to have shifted their distribution to higher latitudes or elevations in response to climate change.

Furthermore, climate change may cause ecological disruption among interacting species, via changes in behaviour and phenology, or via climate niche mismatch. For example, climate change can cause species to move in different directions, potentially disrupting their interactions with each other.

Examples of effects on some biome types are provided in the following. Research into desertification is complex, and there is no single metric which can define all aspects. However, more intense climate change is still expected to increase the current extent of drylands on the Earth's continents. Most of the expansion will be seen over regions such as "southwest North America, the northern fringe of Africa, southern Africa, and Australia".

Mountains cover approximately 25 percent of the Earth's surface and provide a home to more than one-tenth of the global human population. Changes in global climate pose a number of potential risks to mountain habitats.

Boreal forests, also known as taiga, are warming at a faster rate than the global average, leading to drier conditions in the Taiga, which leads to a whole host of subsequent impacts. Climate change has a direct impact on the productivity of the boreal forest, as well as its health and regeneration.

Almost no other ecosystem is as vulnerable to climate change as coral reefs. Updated 2022 estimates show that even at a global average increase of 1.5 °C (2.7 °F) over pre-industrial temperatures, only 0.2% of the world's coral reefs would still be able to withstand marine heatwaves, as opposed to 84% being able to do so now, with the figure dropping to 0% at 2 °C (3.6 °F) warming and beyond.

=== Biodiversity extinction ===
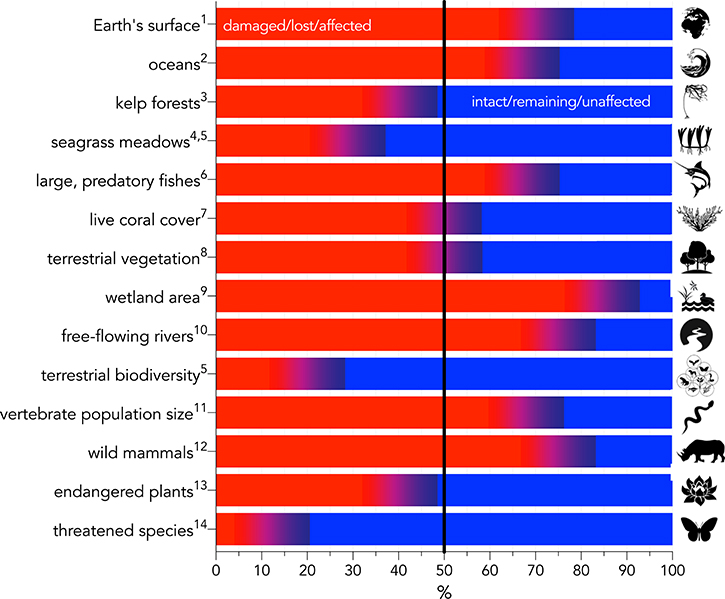
Summary of major environmental-change categories that cause biodiversity loss. The data is expressed as a percentage of human-driven change (in red) relative to baseline (blue), as of 2021. Red indicates the percentage of the category that is damaged, lost, or otherwise affected, whereas blue indicates the percentage that is intact, remaining, or otherwise unaffected.

Biodiversity loss happens when species disappear completely from Earth (extinction) or when there is a decrease or disappearance of species in a specific area. Biodiversity loss means that there is a reduction in biological diversity in a given area. The decrease can be temporary or permanent. It is temporary if the damage that led to the loss is reversible in time, for example through ecological restoration.If this is not possible, then the decrease is permanent. The cause of most of the biodiversity loss is, generally speaking, human activities that push the planetary boundaries too far. These activities include habitat destruction (for example deforestation) and land use intensification (for example monoculture farming). Further problem areas are air and water pollution (including nutrient pollution), over-exploitation, invasive species and climate change.

Many scientists, along with the Global Assessment Report on Biodiversity and Ecosystem Services, say that the main reason for biodiversity loss is a growing human population because this leads to human overpopulation and excessive consumption. Others disagree, saying that loss of habitat is caused mainly by "the growth of commodities for export" and that population has little to do with overall consumption. More important are wealth disparities between and within countries. In any case, all contemporary biodiversity loss has been attributed to human activities.

Climate change is another threat to global biodiversity. For example, coral reefs—which are biodiversity hotspots—will be lost by the year 2100 if global warming continues at the current rate. Additionally, the change of temperatures are likely to increase fire activity driving events such as forest fires. Still, it is the general habitat destruction (often for expansion of agriculture), not climate change, that is currently the bigger driver of biodiversity loss. Invasive species and other disturbances have become more common in forests in the last several decades. These tend to be directly or indirectly connected to climate change and can cause a deterioration of forest ecosystems.

Groups that care about the environment have been working for many years to stop the decrease in biodiversity. Nowadays, many global policies include activities to stop biodiversity loss. For example, the UN Convention on Biological Diversity aims to prevent biodiversity loss and to conserve wilderness areas. However, a 2020 United Nations Environment Programme report found that most of these efforts had failed to meet their goals. For example, of the 20 biodiversity goals laid out by the Aichi Biodiversity Targets in 2010, only six were "partially achieved" by 2020.

This ongoing global extinction is also called the holocene extinction or sixth mass extinction.

=== Animal overpopulation ===
In the wilderness, the problem of animal overpopulation is solved by predators. Predators tend to look for signs of weakness in their prey, and therefore usually first eat the old or sick animals. This has the side effects of ensuring a strong stock among the survivors and controlling the population.

In the absence of predators, animal species are bound by the resources they can find in their environment, but this does not necessarily control overpopulation. In fact, an abundant supply of resources can produce a population boom that ends up with more individuals than the environment can support. In this case, starvation, thirst, and sometimes violent competition for scarce resources may effect a sharp reduction in population, and in a very short lapse, a population crash. Lemmings, as well as other less popular species of rodents, are known to have such cycles of rapid population growth and subsequent decrease.

In an ideal setting, when animal populations grow, so do the number of predators that feed on that particular animal. Animals that have birth defects or weak genes (such as the runt of the litter) also die off, unable to compete over food with stronger, healthier animals.

In reality, an animal that is not native to an environment may have advantages over the native ones, such being unsuitable for the local predators. If left uncontrolled, such an animal can quickly overpopulate and ultimately destroy its environment.

Examples of animal overpopulation caused by introduction of a foreign species abound.

- In the Argentine Patagonia, for example, European species such as the trout and the deer were introduced into the local streams and forests, respectively, and quickly became a plague, competing with and sometimes driving away the local species of fish and ruminants.
- In Australia, when rabbits were introduced (unwillingly) by European immigrants, they bred out of control and ate the plants that other native animals needed to survive. Farmers hunted the rabbits to reduce their population and prevent the damage the rabbits did to the crops. They also brought cats to guard against rabbits and rats. These cats created another problem, since they became predators of local species.

== More examples ==
Some common examples of ecological crises are:

- Deforestation and desertification, with disappearance of many species.
- Extinction events
  - Permian-Triassic extinction event 250 million years ago
  - Cretaceous–Paleogene extinction event 66 million years ago
- The Exxon Valdez oil spill off the coast of Alaska in 1989
- Global warming related to the Greenhouse effect. Warming could involve flooding of the Asian deltas (see also eco refugees), multiplication of extreme weather phenomena and changes in the nature and quantity of the food resources (see Global warming and agriculture). See also international Kyoto Protocol.
- The nuclear meltdown at Chernobyl in 1986 caused the death of many people and animals from cancer, and caused mutations in a large number of animals and people. The area around the plant is now abandoned by humans because of the large amount of radiation generated by the meltdown. Twenty years after the accident, the animals have returned.
- Ozone layer depletion.
- Volcanic eruptions such as Mount St. Helens and the Tunguska and other impact events
- Coral bleaching
- Acid rain
- Groundwater depletion
- North Atlantic garbage patch

== See also ==
- Agroecology – Study of ecological processes in agriculture
- Degrowth – Philosophy calling for reduced consumption and production to achieve sustainability
- Ecological collapse – Ecological communities abruptly losing biodiversity, often irreversibly
- Global warming – Human-caused changes to climate on Earth
- Human overpopulation – Condition wherein human numbers exceed the carrying capacity of the environment
- Peak oil – Point in time when the maximum rate of petroleum extraction is reached
- Collapse: How Societies Choose to Fail or Succeed – 2005 book by Jared Diamond
