= North Atlantic garbage patch =

Large floating field of debris in the North Atlantic Ocean

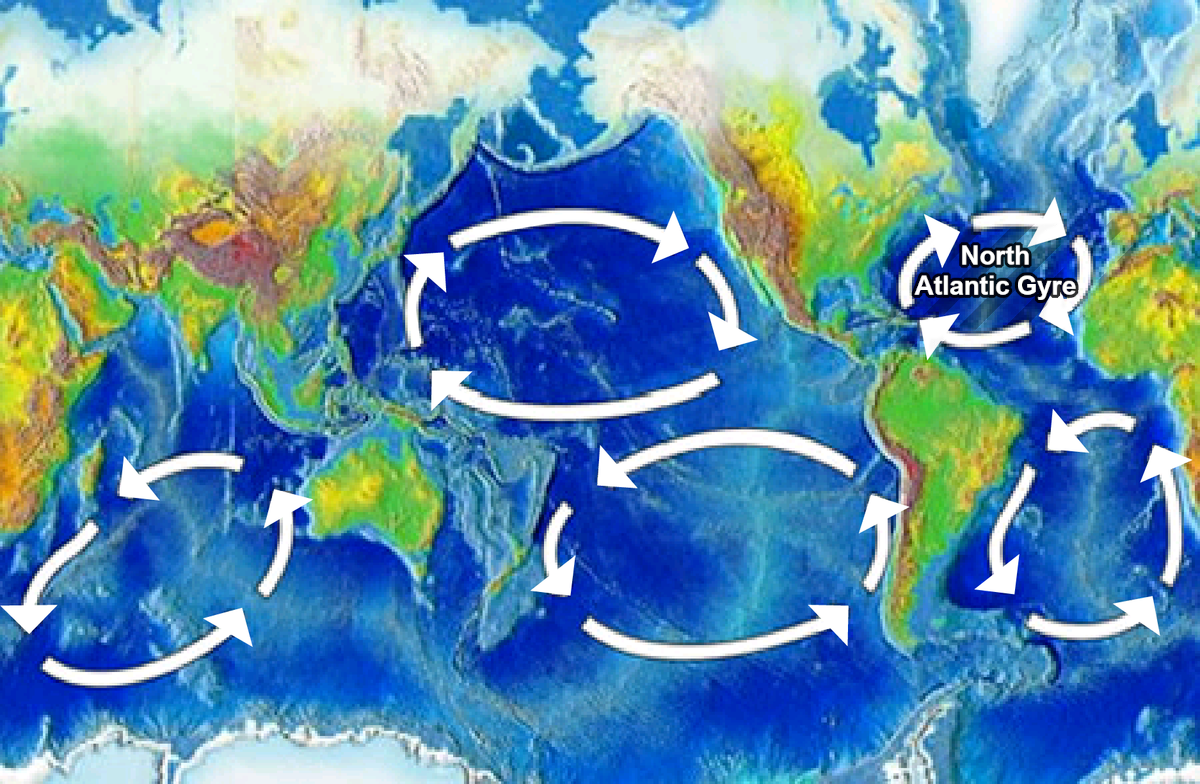
The North Atlantic Gyre is one of five major ocean gyres.

The North Atlantic garbage patch is a garbage patch of human-made marine debris found floating within the North Atlantic Gyre, originally documented in 1972. A 22-year research study conducted by the Sea Education Association estimates the patch to be hundreds of kilometers across, with a density of more than 200,000 pieces of debris per square kilometer. The garbage originates from human-created waste traveling from rivers into the ocean and mainly consists of microplastics. The garbage patch is a large risk to wildlife (and to humans) through plastic consumption and entanglement.

There have only been a few awareness and clean-up efforts for the North Atlantic garbage patch, such as the Garbage Patch State at UNESCO and the Ocean Cleanup, as most of the research and cleanup efforts have been focused on the Great Pacific Garbage Patch, a similar garbage patch in the north Pacific.

== Characteristics ==
=== Location and size ===
The patch is located from 22°N to 38°N and its western and eastern boundaries are unclear. The debris zone shifts by as much as 1,600 km (1,000 mi) north and south seasonally, and drifts even farther south during the El Niño-Southern Oscillation, according to the NOAA. The patch is estimated to be hundreds of kilometers across in size, with a density of more than 200,000 pieces of debris per square kilometer (one piece per five square metres, on average). The concentration of plastic in the North Atlantic garbage patch has stayed mostly constant even though global plastic production has increased five-fold over the course of the 22-year study. This may be caused by the plastics sinking beneath the surface or breaking down into pieces small enough to pass through the net that researchers have used to collect and study the material. Because of this, it is thought that the size of the North Atlantic garbage patch could be an underestimate. It is likely that when the microplastics are taken into account, the patch could be as large as the Great Pacific Garbage Patch.

=== Sources ===
The North Atlantic garbage patch originates from human-created waste that travels from continental rivers into the ocean. Once the trash has made it into the ocean, it is centralized by gyres, which collect trash in large masses. The surface of the garbage patch consists of microplastics such as polyethylene and polypropylene which make up common household items. Denser material that is thought to exist under the surface of the ocean includes plastic called polyethylene terephthalate that is used to make soft drink and water bottles. However, these denser plastics are not observed in the North Atlantic garbage patch because the methods to collect samples only capture the surface microplastics.

== Research ==
A joint study by the Sea Education Association (SEA), Woods Hole Oceanographic Institution, and the University of Hawaii at Manoa collected plastic samples in the western North Atlantic and Caribbean Sea from 1986 to 2008. Nearly 7,000 students from the SEA semester program conducted 6,136 surface plankton net tows on board SEA's sailing research vessels over 22 years, yielding more than 64,000 plastic pieces, mostly fragments less than 10 mm (0.39 in) in size with nearly all lighter than 0.05g. Nikolai Maximenko of the University of Hawaii in Honolulu developed a computer model to describe how plastics are accumulated from converging surface currents to form garbage patches. The model uses data from more than 1,600 satellite-tracked trajectories of drifting buoys to map out surface currents. The plastic data collected by the students at SEA validated Maximenko's model, and researchers were able to successfully predict plastic accumulation in the North Atlantic Ocean.

== Negative effects ==
Since a large amount of plastic in the North Atlantic Garbage Patch is in the form of microplastics, it is easier for marine animals to ingest them. These small plastics can be mistaken for fish eggs. Along with that, the smaller pieces of microplastics can be ingested by animals that are towards the bottom of the food chain such as zooplankton. The plastic that accumulates in the zooplankton then builds up inside the organisms that eat them. There has been little to no research on how microplastics can move up the food chain and potentially be magnified in larger organisms. However, it is predicted that the biomagnification of plastics in the food web will depend on how much plastic is ingested and retained, with retention being heavily dependent on the size of the plastic ingested. This accumulation and potential biomagnification of plastic can lead to malnourished organisms and can be a threat to the biodiversity of the ocean. Along with that, the accumulation of microplastics in marine life can be transferred to humans when they consume contaminated organisms which could cause adverse health effects.

A recent study conducted by The Ocean Cleanup and the Royal Netherlands Institute for Sea Research found that the levels of microplastics on the surface of the North Atlantic Garbage Patch are close to exceeding safe levels for sea life in the region. While the exact consequences of this are unknown, the researchers claim there could be significant adverse effects on marine life if something is not done to combat the issue. Another study conducted in 2021 looked at the accumulation of chemicals and plastics in species that are in the middle of the food web in the North Atlantic. These species included Sardina pilchardus (sardines), Scomber spp., and Trachurus trachurus (mackerels). They found that while the concentrations of several chemicals inside the fish were lower than what is found in the same species in adjacent areas, they found that there were plastic pieces in the stomachs of 29% of the sampled organisms.

Hurricane Larry in September 2021 deposited, during the storm peak, 113,000 particles/m2/day as it passed over Newfoundland, Canada. Back-trajectory modelling and polymer type analysis indicate that those microplastics may have been ocean-sourced as the hurricane traversed the North Atlantic garbage patch of the North Atlantic Gyre.

== Awareness and clean-up efforts ==
Few efforts have been made to clean up the North Atlantic Garbage Patch. According to Kara Law of the Sea Education Association, removing the microplastics "would likely cause as much harm as good because of all the other small creatures in the ocean that would get filtered out too". On 11 April 2013, in order to create awareness, artist Maria Cristina Finucci founded The Garbage Patch State at UNESCO –Paris in front of Director General Irina Bokova. The Garbage Patch State was first in a series of events under the patronage of UNESCO and of Italian Ministry of the Environment, sparking a series of art exhibits across the world used to bring attention to the size and severity of the garbage patches and incite awareness and action.

Dutch inventor Boyan Slat and his nonprofit organization The Ocean Cleanup is developing technology to rid the oceans of plastic. Cleanup is planned to start in the Great Pacific Garbage Patch first, and eventually move around to the other patches across the globe. Aside from cleaning the microplastics from the oceans, the Ocean Cleanup is also developing technologies to remove larger pieces of plastic from rivers, which are largely attributed as the main sources of plastic in the ocean.

== See also ==
- Ecosystem of the North Pacific Subtropical Gyre
- Great Pacific Garbage Patch
- Indian Ocean garbage patch
- Plastisphere
- Sargasso Sea
