= Indian Ocean Gyre =

Major oceanic gyre in the Indian Ocean

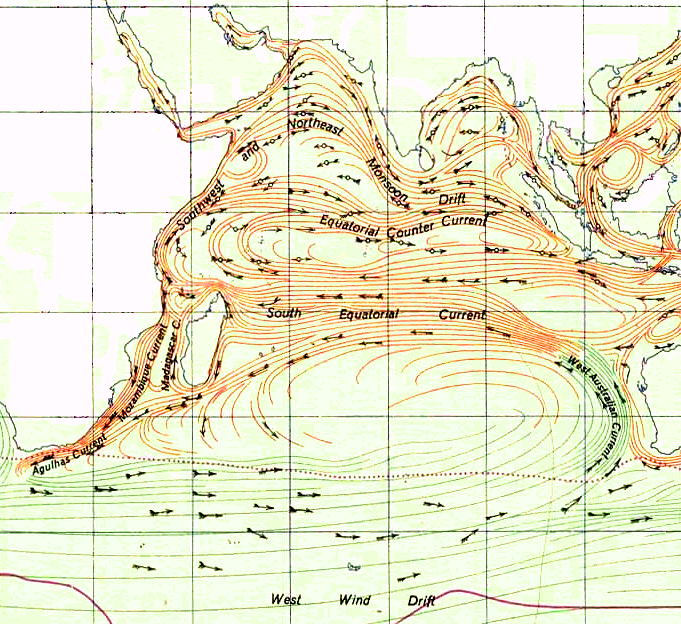
The Indian Ocean gyre

The Indian Ocean gyre, located in the Indian Ocean, is one of the five major oceanic gyres, large systems of rotating ocean currents, which together form the backbone of the global conveyor belt. The Indian Ocean gyre is composed of two major currents: the South Equatorial Current, and the West Australian Current.

Normally moving counter-clockwise, in the Northern Hemisphere winter the Indian Ocean gyre reverses direction due to the seasonal winds of the South Asian Monsoon. In the summer, the land is warmer than the ocean, so surface winds blow from the ocean to the land. However, during the winter, these temperatures reverse, making the winds blow from the land to the ocean. Because most of the air pressure gradient is retained behind the Tibetan Plateau, air pressure gradients over the Indian Ocean and the gyre are small. This results in winds of moderate strength, due to the protection from the full force winds blowing off the Mongolian high-pressure region. Because of these moderate, dry winds, the Winter Monsoon season in the Indian Ocean region is the dry season for most of Southern Asia. Due to this seasonal wind cycle, the currents of the Indian Ocean, which make up the Indian Ocean gyre, are directly affected, causing reversal.

== Garbage patch ==
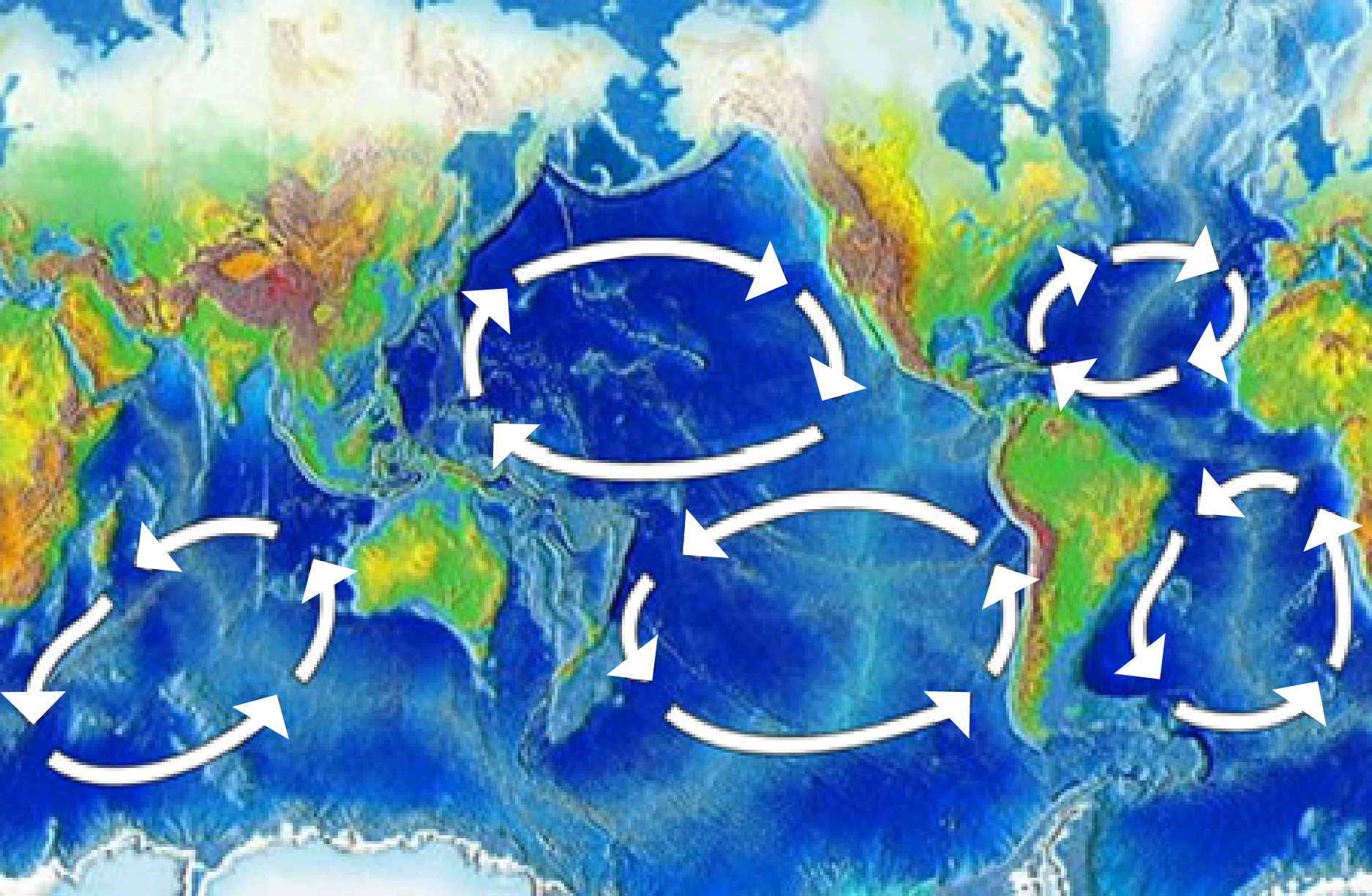
There are trash vortices in each of the five major oceanic gyres

The Indian Ocean Garbage Patch on a continuous ocean map centered near the south pole

The Indian Ocean garbage patch, discovered in 2010, is a marine garbage patch, a gyre of marine litter, suspended in the upper water column of the central Indian Ocean, specifically the Indian Ocean Gyre, one of the five major oceanic gyres. The patch does not appear as a continuous debris field. As with other patches in each of the five oceanic gyres, the plastics in it break down to ever smaller particles, and to constituent polymers. As with the other patches, the field constitutes an elevated level of pelagic plastics, chemical sludge, and other debris; primarily particles that are invisible to the naked eye. The concentration of particle debris has been estimated to be approximately 10,000 particles per square kilometer.
