= Manta trawl =

Net system for sampling the surface of the ocean

A manta trawl is a net system for sampling the surface of the ocean. It resembles a manta ray, with metal wings and a broad mouth. The net it pulls is made of thin mesh, and the whole trawl is towed behind a scientific research vessel. The manta trawl is useful for collecting samples from the surface of the ocean, such as sampling the plastic pieces making up the Great Pacific Garbage Patch as well as the associated plankton.
