= Sargasso Sea =

Region of the North Atlantic Ocean

The Great Atlantic Sargassum Belt Sargasso Sea major currents in the North Atlantic

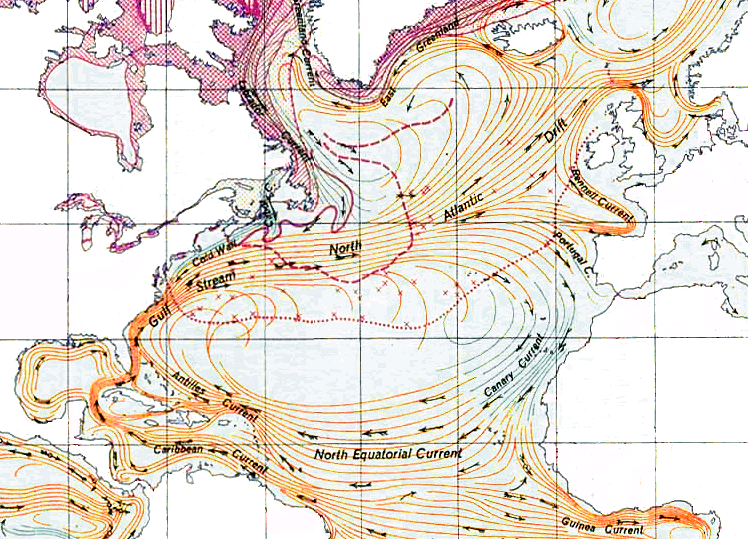
The Sargasso Sea in the North Atlantic is bounded by the Gulf Stream on the west, the North Atlantic Current on the north, the Canary Current on the east, and the North Equatorial Current on the south.

The Sargasso Sea (/sɑːrˈɡæsoʊ/) is a region of the Atlantic Ocean bounded by four currents forming an ocean gyre. It is the only named sea without land boundaries. It is distinguished from other parts of the Atlantic Ocean by its characteristic brown Sargassum seaweed and calm blue waters.

The sea is bounded on the west by the Gulf Stream, on the north by the North Atlantic Current, on the east by the Canary Current, and on the south by the North Atlantic Equatorial Current, the four together forming a clockwise-circulating system of ocean currents termed the North Atlantic Gyre. It lies between 20° and 35° north and 40° and 70° west and is approximately 1,100 kilometres (600 nautical miles) wide by 3,200 km (1,750 nmi) long. Bermuda is near the western fringes of the sea. While all of the above currents deposit marine plants and refuse into the sea, ocean water in the Sargasso Sea is distinctive for its deep blue color and exceptional clarity, with underwater visibility of up to 60 m (200 ft).

== History ==
Portuguese navigators had reached the Sargasso Sea (western North Atlantic region), naming it after the Sargassum seaweed growing there (sargaço or sargasso in Portuguese). Later in 1492, Christopher Columbus wrote about seaweed that he feared would trap his ship and potentially hide shallow waters that could run them aground, as well as a lack of wind that he feared would trap them.

The sea may have been known to earlier mariners, as a poem by 4th-century author Avienius describes a portion of the Atlantic as being covered with seaweed and windless, citing a now-lost account by the 5th century BC Carthaginian Himilco the Navigator. Columbus was aware of this account and thought Himilco had reached the Sargasso Sea, as did several other explorers. However, modern scholars consider this unlikely.

In 1609, the English vessel Sea Venture was blown to the shore of Bermuda. The sea has also been the site of whaling and fishing.

The 1920–1922 Dana expeditions, led by Johannes Schmidt, determined that the European eel's breeding sites were in the Sargasso Sea. The sea has played a role in a number of other pioneering research efforts, including William Beebe and Otis Barton's 1932 dive where they conducted observations of animals and radio broadcasts, John Swallow's work on the Swallow float in the late 1950s, the discovery of Prochlorococcus by a team of researchers in the 1980s, and various oceanographic data gathering programs such as those of Henry Stommel.

== Boundaries ==
The sea is bounded on the west by the Gulf Stream, on the north by the North Atlantic Current, on the east by the Canary Current, and on the south by the North Atlantic Equatorial Current, the four together forming a clockwise-circulating system of ocean currents termed the North Atlantic Gyre. It lies between 20° to 35° N and 40° and 70° W and is approximately 1,100 km (600 nmi) wide by 3,200 km (1,750 nmi) long. Bermuda is near the western fringes of the sea.

Because the Sargasso Sea is bordered by oceanic currents, its borders may change. The Canary Current in particular is widely variable, and often the line utilized is one west of the Mid-Atlantic Ridge. A 2011 report based the sea's boundaries on several variables including currents, presence of seaweed, and the topography of the ocean floor, and determined that the specific boundaries of the sea were "between 22°–38°N, 76°–43°W and centred on 30°N and 60°W" for a total of around 4,163,499 km^{2} (1,213,882 sq nmi).

== Ecology ==
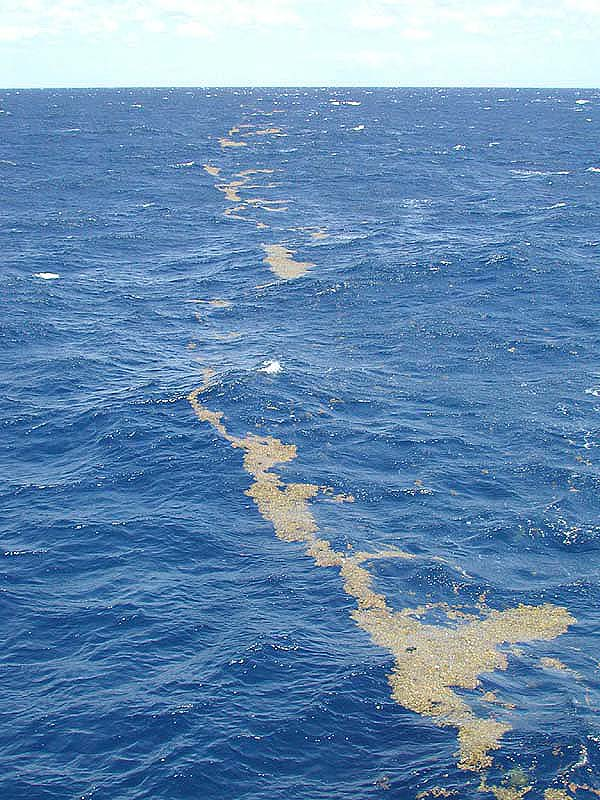
Lines of sargassum in the Sargasso Sea

The Sargasso Sea is home to seaweed of the genus Sargassum, which floats en masse on the surface. The sargassum masses generally are not a threat to shipping, and historic incidents of sailing ships being trapped there are due to the often-calm winds of the horse latitudes.

The Sargasso Sea plays a role in the migration of catadromous eel species, such as the European eel, the American eel, and the American conger eel. The larvae of these species hatch within the sea, and as they grow they travel to Europe or the east coast of North America. Later in life, the matured eel migrates back to the Sargasso Sea to spawn and lay eggs. It is also believed that after hatching, young loggerhead sea turtles use currents, such as the Gulf Stream, to travel to the Sargasso Sea, where they use the sargassum as cover from predators until they are mature. The sargassum fish is a species of frogfish specially adapted to blend in among the sargassum seaweed. Millions of European eel babies are born there and then make a three-year journey back to UK waters; many seabird species also fly and feed across it on their way to Britain.

In the early 2000s, the Sargasso Sea was sampled as part of the Global Ocean Sampling Expedition, to evaluate its diversity of microbial life through metagenomics. Contrary to previous theories, results indicated the area has a wide variety of prokaryotic life. Commonly called seaweed, Sargassum is a type of macroalgae. Like all algae, it produces oxygen. Based on 1975 measurements of oxygen production, and estimates of the total mass of Sargassum in the sea, it can be calculated that the Sargasso Sea may produce 2.2 billion litres of O_{2} per hour, making the sea one of the primary sources of atmospheric oxygen.

=== Threats ===
The Sargasso Sea, like many unique ocean ecosystems, is under various threats, such as industrial-scale fishing, plastic waste pollution, oil drilling, and deep-sea mining. Owing to surface currents, the Sargasso accumulates a high concentration of non-biodegradable plastic waste. The area contains the huge North Atlantic garbage patch. Several nations and nongovernmental organizations have united to protect the Sargasso Sea. These organizations include the Sargasso Sea Commission established in 2014 by the governments of the Azores (Portugal), Bermuda (United Kingdom), Monaco, the United Kingdom and the United States.

Bacteria that consume plastic have been found in the plastic-polluted waters of the Sargasso Sea; however, it is unknown whether these bacteria ultimately clean up poisons or simply spread them elsewhere in the marine microbial ecosystem. Plastic debris can absorb toxic chemicals from ocean pollution, potentially poisoning anything that eats it. Human activity in the Sargasso Sea has negatively affected it, such as over-fishing and shipping.

== Depictions in popular culture ==
The Sargasso Sea is often portrayed in literature and the media as an area of mystery, where ships and wreckage can become mired in weed for years, even centuries, unable to escape. It serves as a setting for many classic fantasy stories, notably Jules Verne's Twenty Thousand Leagues Under the Seas (1870) and William Hope Hodgson's The Boats of the "Glen Carrig" (1907). The sea is sometimes used purely as a metaphor, such as in modernist poet Ezra Pound's Portrait d'une Femme, which opens with "Your mind and you are our Sargasso Sea", suggesting a repository of trivia and disconnected facts. It is also the title of British novelist Jean Rhys's book Wide Sargasso Sea, which Rhys wrote as an imagined prequel to Charlotte Brontë's Jane Eyre, and it is also used purely as a metaphor to evoke the protagonist's cultural displacement, disorientation, and isolation.
