= 5 Gyres =

American non-profit organization that focuses on reducing plastics pollution

- Headquarters: Santa Monica
- Revenue: 1,283,486 United States dollar (2020)
- Total Assets: 1,104,401 United States dollar (2020)
- Website: www.5gyres.org

The 5 Gyres Institute is a 501(c)(3) non-profit organization that focuses on reducing plastics pollution by focusing on primary research. Programs concentrate on science, education and adventure (research expeditions for citizen-scientists). Since 2017, 5 Gyres has been in special consultative status with the United Nations Economic and Social Council. The organization's 2015 Expedition was featured in the 2017 documentary "Smog of the Sea," produced by Jack Johnson, who participated in the voyage.

The organizations name is a reference to the five main subtropical gyres all of which have plastic pollution.

== History ==
5 Gyres was founded by Anna Cummins and Marcus Eriksen. Eriksen and Cummins have been featured speakers at universities and in news stories. Anna Cummins has also been awarded the Golden Goody Award, during a meeting of the Los Angeles chapter of the USNC for UN WOMEN First Annual Special Assembly. Before founding 5 Gyres, Cummins and Eriksen had worked at the Algalita Marine Research Foundation, with founder Charles J. Moore, who is currently a scientific advisor for 5 Gyres.

5 Gyres was one of two organizations that sent Expeditions to research the Great Pacific Garbage Patch. 5 Gyres presented their results at the Aquarium of the Pacific and were cited as a source for estimating the size of the gyres. 5 Gyres explained their activities at a National Aquarium radio broadcast, were featured at the Two Oceans Aquarium website, and prepared tips on how to reduce plastic consumption. 5 Gyres also worked with environmental artist Marina DeBris in using trashion to help raise awareness of ocean trash.

5 Gyres was the first organization to research plastic pollution in all five main subtropical gyres and first to determine how much plastic is on the surface of the world's oceans: Nearly 270,000 metric tons and 5.25 trillion pieces. They published this research as the Global Estimate of Plastic Pollution in 2014, which will update again in 2018. Historically, the group has presented traveling exhibits, including stops at universities and educational discussions; in 2016 their education presentations reached 3,000 students through the "Every Kid in a Park" program.

In 2012, 5 Gyres was first to discover that plastic microbeads (commonly found in personal care products like toothpaste and exfoliating soaps) were polluting our waterways. 5 Gyres used that study to help forge a coalition that convinced companies like Procter & Gamble, Johnson & Johnson and L'Oreal to phase out plastic microbeads. After only two years, the campaign scaled into a national movement, culminating in a watershed victory when President Obama signed the Microbead-Free Waters Act into law at the end of 2015.

This win underscored 5 Gyres' model of using science to drive solutions, and informed the organization's approach to raising awareness about polystyrene and Styrofoam plastic pollution through their 2017 #foamfree Action Campaign, which:

- Encourages a pledge to refuse single-use polystyrene and expanded polystyrene foam (better known as Styrofoam) products.
- Connects visitors with local bans (or the resources to start one).
- Gives them the ability to tweet, email or call their representatives for support.
- Informs supporters about preemptive "ban on bans" developments.
- Commissions the first-ever study to assess the toxicity of hard polystyrene plastic.

With more than 100 communities in California recently enacting polystyrene bans, and a statewide ban on the ballot for 2018, 5 Gyres sees polystyrene as a natural extension of the momentum that began with microbeads.
