= Garbage patch =

Gyre of marine debris

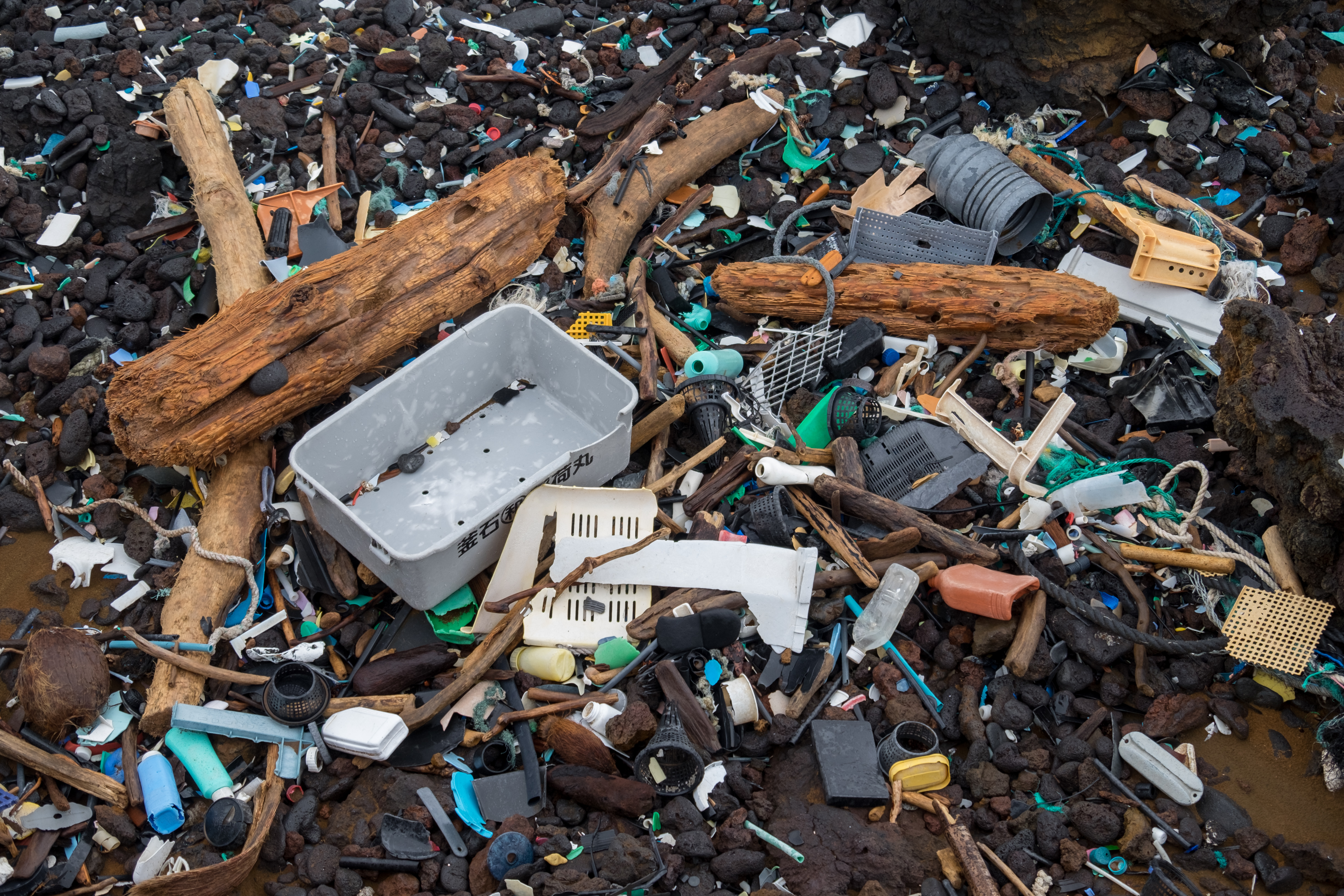
Trash washed ashore in Hawaii from the Great Pacific Garbage Patch

A garbage patch is a gyre of marine debris particles caused by the effects of ocean currents and increasing plastic pollution by human populations. These human-caused collections of plastic and other debris are responsible for ecosystem and environmental problems that affect marine life, contaminate oceans with toxic chemicals, and contribute to greenhouse gas emissions. Once waterborne, marine debris becomes mobile. Flotsam can be blown by the wind, or follow the flow of ocean currents, often ending up in the middle of oceanic gyres where currents are weakest.

Within garbage patches, the waste is not compact, and although most of it is near the surface of the ocean, it can be found up to more than 30 metres (100 ft) deep in the water. Patches contain plastics and debris in a range of sizes from microplastics and small scale plastic pellet pollution, to large objects such as fishing nets and consumer goods and appliances lost from floods and shipping loss.

Garbage patches grow because of widespread loss of plastic from human trash collection systems. The United Nations Environmental Program estimated that "for every square mile of ocean" there are about "46,000 pieces of plastic". The 10 largest emitters of oceanic plastic pollution worldwide are, from the most to the least, China, Indonesia, Philippines, Vietnam, Sri Lanka, Thailand, Egypt, Malaysia, Nigeria, and Bangladesh, largely through the rivers Yangtze, Indus, Yellow, Hai, Nile, Ganges, Pearl, Amur, Niger, and the Mekong, and accounting for "90 percent of all the plastic that reaches the world's oceans". Asia was the leading source of mismanaged plastic waste, with China alone accounting for 2.4 million metric tons.

The best known of these is the Great Pacific Garbage Patch which has the highest density of marine debris and plastic. The Pacific Garbage Patch has two mass buildups: the western garbage patch and the eastern garbage patch, the former off the coast of Japan and the latter between California and Hawaii. These garbage patches contain 90 million tonnes (100 million short tons) of debris. Other identified patches include the North Atlantic garbage patch between North America and Africa, the South Atlantic garbage patch located between eastern South America and the tip of Africa, the South Pacific garbage patch located west of South America, and the Indian Ocean garbage patch found east of South Africa listed in order of decreasing size.

== Identified patches ==
Of the five gyres on this map, all have significant garbage patches.

In 2014, there were five areas across all the oceans where the majority of plastic concentrated. Researchers collected a total of 3070 samples across the world to identify hot spots of surface level plastic pollution. The pattern of distribution closely mirrored models of oceanic currents with the North Pacific Gyre, or Great Pacific Garbage Patch, being the highest density of plastic accumulation. The other four garbage patches include the North Atlantic garbage patch between the North America and Africa, the South Atlantic garbage patch located between eastern South America and the tip of Africa, the South Pacific garbage patch located west of South America, and the Indian Ocean garbage patch found east of South Africa.

=== Great Pacific ===
The Great Pacific Garbage Patch (also Pacific trash vortex and North Pacific Garbage Patch) is a garbage patch, a gyre of marine debris particles, in the central North Pacific Ocean. It is located roughly from 135°W to 155°W and 35°N to 42°N. The collection of plastic and floating trash originates from the Pacific Rim, including countries in Asia, North America, and South America.

Despite the common public perception of the patch existing as giant islands of floating garbage, its low density (4 particles per cubic metre (3.1/yd^{3})) prevents detection by satellite imagery, or even by casual boaters or divers in the area. This is because the patch is a widely dispersed area consisting primarily of suspended "fingernail-sized or smaller"—often microscopic—particles in the upper water column known as microplastics.

Researchers from the Ocean Cleanup project claimed that the patch covers 1.6 million square kilometres (620,000 square miles) consisting of 45,000–129,000 metric tons (50,000–142,000 short tons) of plastic as of 2018, later growing to twice the size of Texas. By the end of 2024, the Ocean Cleanup had removed more than one million pounds of trash from the Great Pacific Garbage Patch, or 0.5% of the total accumulated trash. While microplastics dominate the area by count, 92% of the mass of the patch consists of larger objects. Some of the plastic is over 50 years old, and includes items (and fragments of items) such as "plastic lighters, toothbrushes, water bottles, pens, baby bottles, cell phones, plastic bags, and nurdles".

Research indicates that the patch is rapidly accumulating. The patch is believed to have increased "10-fold each decade" since 1945. The gyre contains approximately six pounds of plastic for every pound of plankton. A similar patch of floating plastic debris is found in the Atlantic Ocean, called the North Atlantic garbage patch.

=== South Pacific ===
Visualization of the flow pattern of ocean pollutants

The South Pacific garbage patch is an area of ocean with increased levels of marine debris and plastic particle pollution, within the ocean's pelagic zone. This area is in the South Pacific Gyre, which itself spans from waters east of Australia to the South American continent, as far north as the Equator, and south until reaching the Antarctic Circumpolar Current. The degradation of plastics in the ocean also leads to a rise in the level of toxins in the area. The garbage patch was confirmed in mid-2017, and has been compared to the Great Pacific Garbage Patch's state in 2007, making the former ten years younger. The South Pacific garbage patch is not visible on satellites, and is not a landmass. Most particles are smaller than a grain of rice. A researcher said: "This cloud of microplastics extends both vertically and horizontally. It's more like smog than a patch".

=== Indian Ocean ===
The Indian Ocean garbage patch, discovered in 2010, is a marine garbage patch, a gyre of marine litter, suspended in the upper water column of the central Indian Ocean, specifically the Indian Ocean Gyre, one of the five major oceanic gyres. The patch does not appear as a continuous debris field. As with other patches in each of the five oceanic gyres, the plastics in it break down to ever smaller particles, and to constituent polymers. As with the other patches, the field constitutes an elevated level of pelagic plastics, chemical sludge, and other debris; primarily particles that are invisible to the naked eye. The concentration of particle debris has been estimated to be approximately 10,000 particles per square kilometer.

=== North Atlantic ===
The North Atlantic garbage patch is a garbage patch of human-made marine debris found floating within the North Atlantic Gyre, originally documented in 1972. A 22-year research study conducted by the Sea Education Association estimates the patch to be hundreds of kilometers across, with a density of more than 200,000 pieces of debris per square kilometer. The garbage originates from human-created waste traveling from rivers into the ocean and mainly consists of microplastics. The garbage patch is a large risk to wildlife (and to humans) through plastic consumption and entanglement.

There have only been a few awareness and clean-up efforts for the North Atlantic garbage patch, such as the Garbage Patch State at UNESCO and the Ocean Cleanup, as most of the research and cleanup efforts have been focused on the Great Pacific Garbage Patch, a similar garbage patch in the north Pacific.

== Environmental issues ==
=== Photodegradation of plastics ===
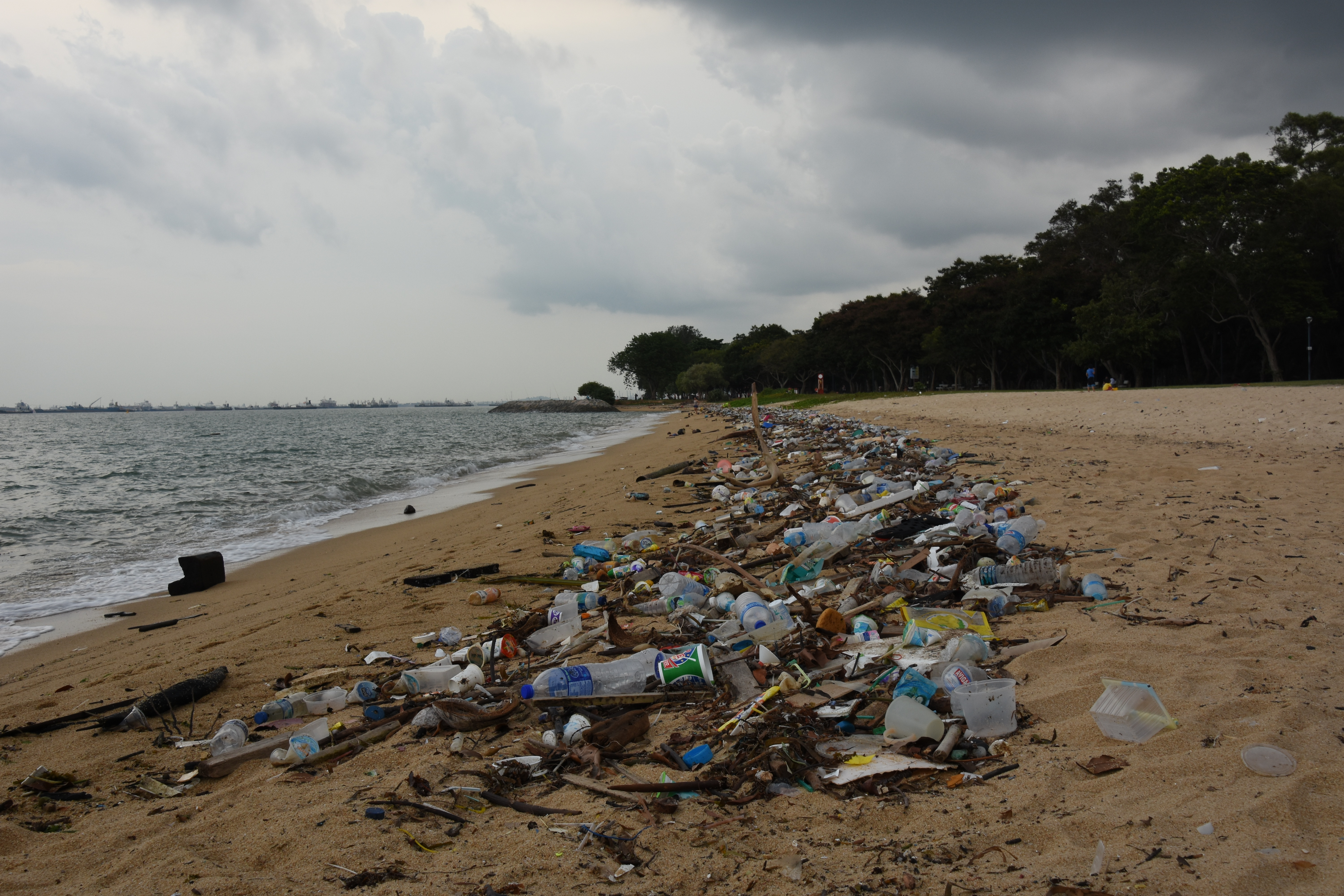
Washed-up plastic waste on a beach in Singapore

The North Atlantic patch is one of several oceanic regions where researchers have studied the effects and impact of plastic photodegradation in the neustonic layer of water. Unlike organic debris, which biodegrades, plastic disintegrates into ever smaller pieces while remaining a polymer (without changing chemically). This process continues down to the molecular level. Some plastics decompose within a year of entering the water, releasing potentially toxic chemicals such as bisphenol A, PCBs and derivatives of polystyrene.

As the plastic flotsam photodegrades into smaller and smaller pieces, it concentrates in the upper water column. As it disintegrates, the pieces become small enough to be ingested by aquatic organisms that reside near the ocean's surface. Plastic may become concentrated in neuston, thereby entering the food chain. Disintegration means that much of the plastic is too small to be seen. Moreover, plastic exposed to sunlight and in watering environments produce greenhouse gases, leading to further environmental impact.

=== Effects on marine life ===
The 2017 United Nations Ocean Conference estimated that the oceans might contain more weight in plastics than fish by the year 2050. Some long-lasting plastics end up in the stomachs of marine animals. Plastic attracts seabirds and fish. When marine life consumes plastic allowing it to enter the food chain, this can lead to greater problems when species that have consumed plastic are then eaten by other predators.

Animals can also become trapped in plastic nets and rings, which can cause death. Plastic pollution affects at least 700 marine species, including sea turtles, seals, seabirds, fish, whales, and dolphins. Cetaceans have been sighted within the patch, which poses entanglement and ingestion risks to animals using the Great Pacific Garbage Patch as a migration corridor or core habitat.

==== Plastic consumption ====
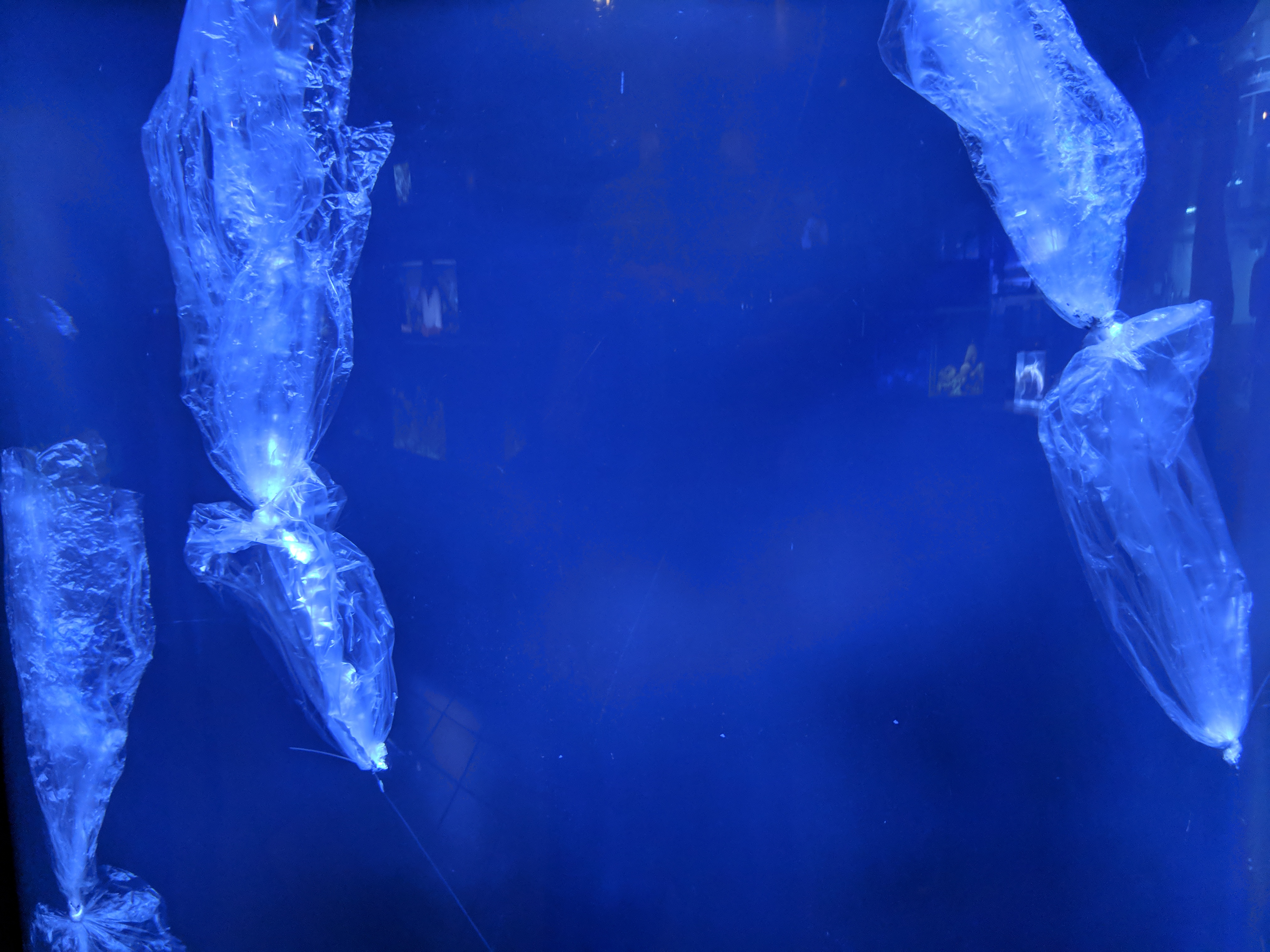
An exhibit at the Mote Marine Laboratory that displays plastic bags in the ocean that look similar to jellyfish.

With the increased amount of plastic in the ocean, living organisms are now at a greater risk of harm from plastic consumption and entanglement. Approximately 23% of aquatic mammals, and 36% of seabirds have experienced the detriments of plastic presence in the ocean. Since as much as 70% of the trash is estimated to be on the ocean floor, and microplastics are only millimeters wide, sealife at nearly every level of the food chain is affected. Animals who feed off of the bottom of the ocean risk sweeping microplastics into their systems while gathering food. Smaller marine life such as mussels and worms sometimes mistake plastic for their prey.

Larger animals are also affected by plastic consumption because they feed on fish, and are indirectly consuming microplastics already trapped inside their prey. Likewise, humans are also susceptible to microplastic consumption. People who eat seafood also eat some of the microplastics that were ingested by marine life. Oysters and clams are popular vehicles for human microplastic consumption. Animals who are within the general vicinity of the water are also affected by the plastic in the ocean. Studies have shown 36% species of seabirds are consuming plastic because they mistake larger pieces of plastic for food. Plastic can cause blockage of intestines as well as tearing of interior stomach and intestinal lining of marine life, ultimately leading to starvation and death.

==== Entanglement ====
Not all marine life is affected by the consumption of plastic. Some instead find themselves tangled in larger pieces of garbage that cause just as much harm as the barely visible microplastics. Trash that has the possibility of wrapping itself around a living organism may cause strangulation or drowning. If the trash gets stuck around a ligament that is not vital for airflow, the ligament may grow with a malformation. Plastic's existence in the ocean becomes cyclical because marine life that is killed by it ultimately decompose in the ocean, re-releasing the plastics into the ecosystem.

=== Deposits on landmasses ===
Research in 2017 reported "the highest density of plastic rubbish anywhere in the world" on remote and uninhabited Henderson Island in South Pacific as a result of the South Pacific Gyre. The beaches contained an estimated 37.7 million items of debris together weighing 17.6 tonnes. In a study transect on North Beach, each day 17 to 268 new items washed up on a 10-metre section.
