= Charles J. Moore =

Oceanographer and boat captain

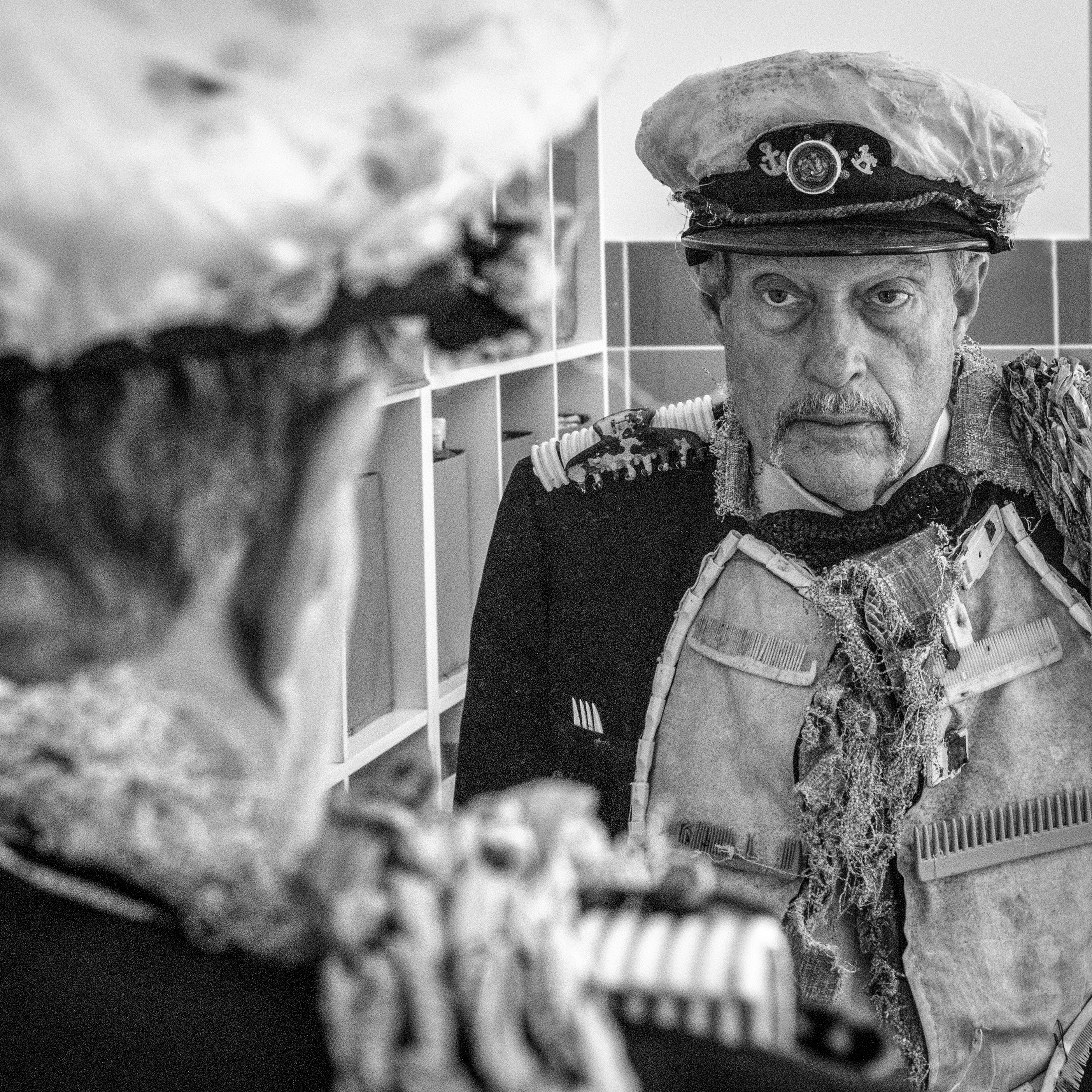
Charles Moore (2018)

Charles J. Moore (1947) is an oceanographer and boat captain known for articles that brought attention to the 'Great Pacific Garbage Patch', an area of the Pacific Ocean strewn with floating plastic debris caught in a gyre.

== Great Pacific Garbage Patch ==
In 1997, while returning to southern California after finishing the Los Angeles-to-Hawaii Transpacific sailing race, he and his crew caught sight of trash floating in the North Pacific Gyre, one of the most remote regions of the ocean. He wrote articles about the extent of this garbage, and the effects on sea life, which attracted significant attention in the media.

“As I gazed from the deck at the surface of what ought to have been a pristine ocean,” Moore later wrote in an essay for Natural History, “I was confronted, as far as the eye could see, with the sight of plastic. It seemed unbelievable, but I never found a clear spot. In the week it took to cross the subtropical high, no matter what time of day I looked, plastic debris was floating everywhere: bottles, bottle caps, wrappers, fragments.” An oceanographic colleague of Moore's dubbed this floating junk yard “the Great Pacific Garbage Patch,” and despite Moore's efforts to suggest different metaphors — “a swirling sewer,” “a superhighway of trash” connecting two “trash cemeteries” — “Garbage Patch” appears to have stuck.

His 1999 study showed that there was six times more plastic, by weight, in this part of the ocean than the zooplankton that feeds ocean life. In 2002, a later study showed that even off the coast of California, plastic outweighed zooplankton by a factor of 5:2. These numbers were significantly higher than expected and shocked many oceanographers.

== Algalita Marine Research and Education ==
Moore is the founder of the Algalita Marine Research and Education in Long Beach, California.

In 2008 the Foundation co-sponsored the JUNK Raft project, to "creatively raise awareness about plastic debris and pollution in the ocean", and specifically the Great Pacific Garbage Patch trapped in the North Pacific Gyre, by sailing 2,600 miles across the Pacific Ocean on a 30-foot-long (9.1 m) raft made from an old Cessna 310 aircraft fuselage and six pontoons filled with 15,000 old plastic bottles. Crewed by Dr. Marcus Eriksen of the Foundation, and film-maker Joel Paschal, the raft set off from Long Beach, California on 1 June 2008, arriving in Honolulu, Hawaii on 28 August 2008. On the way, they gave valuable water supplies to Ocean rower Roz Savage, also on an environmental awareness voyage.

The construction of the JUNK Raft began in April 2008 and was finished in May that year. The undertaking of constructing this seaworthy raft was aided by volunteers who cleaned bottles and fastened bottle caps, stuffing them into the recycled fisherman's net pontoon forms. Recently, the foundation sponsored an expedition to the Southern Hemisphere that involved Moore and his colleagues travelling to Easter Island to collect water samples for analysis of plastic content, then traveled to Valparaiso, Chile, to work with the Cientificos de la Basura program. The crew later collected water samples from different beaches along the Chilean coastline. During this expedition, Moore and his crew collected plastic pollution samples across the Equatorial Currents, the South Pacific Gyre, and at various stations along the Chilean coast. Upon analyzing the plastic debris concentration data, Moore found increased plastic concentration in all the water samples he collected. However, according to the Algalita Foundation, more datasets are needed to support their hypothesis.

In May 2020, he founded The Moore Institute for Plastic Pollution Research and serves as Research Director with over 20 years of experience in this field.

The Moore Institute for Plastic Pollution Research focuses on research around micro- and nano-plastics in the environment Charles J. Moore research director will become articulate in identifying microplastics as an area of concern in our oceans. (Moore Institute for Plastic Pollution Research 2023)

== See also ==
- Marine debris
- Project Kaisei
- Plastiglomerate
- Plastiki
