= Garbage Patch State =

Art by Maria Cristina Finucci

- Artist: Maria Cristina Finucci
- Year: 2013 (ongoing)
- Medium: Transmedia, Installation Art, Environmental sculpture
- Movement: Environmental Art
- Website: garbagepatchstate.org

The Garbage Patch State – Wasteland is an ongoing transmedia, environmental artwork by Maria Cristina Finucci. The project aims to raise awareness about the environmental hazard of the Great Pacific Garbage Patch caused by the dispersion of plastic debris in the oceans. Installations, performances, and videos have been carried out under the patronage of UNESCO and the Italian Ministry of the Environment.

== Installations ==
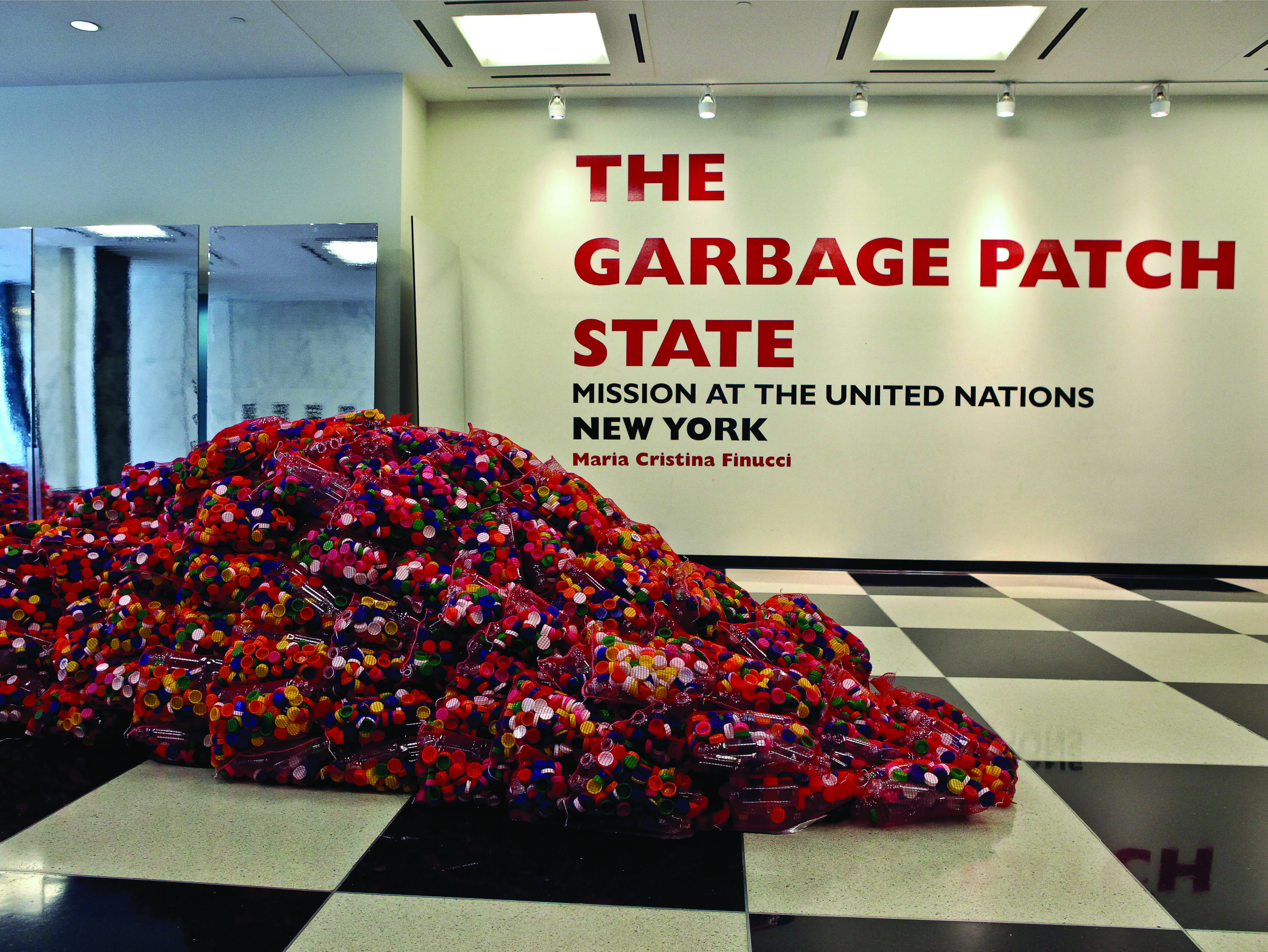
United Nations Headquarters, New York, 2014

- Paris UNESCO: 11 April 2013
- Venice Biennale: 12 April 2013
- Madrid ARCO: 18 February 2014
- Rome MAXXI: 11 April 2014
- New York UNHQ: 29 September 2014
- Geneva UNOG: 29 June 2015 for World Environment Day celebrations
- Milan EXPO: 15 June 2015
- Venice BLUEMED: 16 October 2015
- Paris COP21: 30 November 2015
- Palermo UNIPA: 11 April 2016
- Mozia, Sicily: 25 September 2016
- Roman Forum, Rome: 8 June - 29 July 2018, HELP the Ocean
- Fuorisalone, Milan: 8 April - 14 April 2019, HELP
- Italian Cultural Institute of Los Angeles: 14 October 2022, What About the 8%?
- Fuorisalone, Milan: 17 April - 23 April 2023, H2o Help

== Description ==
On April 11, 2013, in the "Salle des pas perdus" of the UNESCO headquarters in Paris, the first presentation of The Garbage Patch State took place with the display of a large scale installation and performance artwork. Hundreds of transparent plastic bags, each filled with water and a multitude of brightly colored plastic caps, were created. These bags were meant to be small reproductions of the "islands" present in The Garbage Patch.

The bags were arranged in front of a mirror approximately 30 m (98 ft) long. It looked as if there were twice as many as there were in reality. On the back wall, opposite the mirrors, there was a large image representing distant clouds made of large pixels.

Viewers who were present at this exhibition not only felt as if they were standing in front of the Garbage Patch State, but could also see their own reflection in the mirror, becoming themselves protagonists in the piece.

In the presence of UNESCO's Director-General Irina Bokova, of the Permanent Representative and Ambassador of Italy before UNESCO Maurizio Serra, and of UNESCO's Director for Culture Francesco Bandarin, as well as the public, Cristina Finucci pronounced a speech for the inauguration of the Garbage Patch State.

During the Venice Biennale 2013, the Garbage Patch State, like the majority of other states, has had its own pavilion in the yard of the Ca' Foscari University. Thousands of colored plastic cups climb over the walls surrounding the ancient building as if they are going to reach the lagoon.

In 2014, the Garbage Patch State went to Madrid for ARCO, the international art fair, with a public installation on Gran Vía. This work consists of a "sheet" made out of plastic bottles containing flower sprouts, that at night lighten with camera's flashes.

For the first National day of the State, the artist has inaugurated the first embassy in the MAXXI Museum of Rome. She also created a new installation consisting of a long plastic "wave" composed by thousands of fragments of recycled plastic bottles.

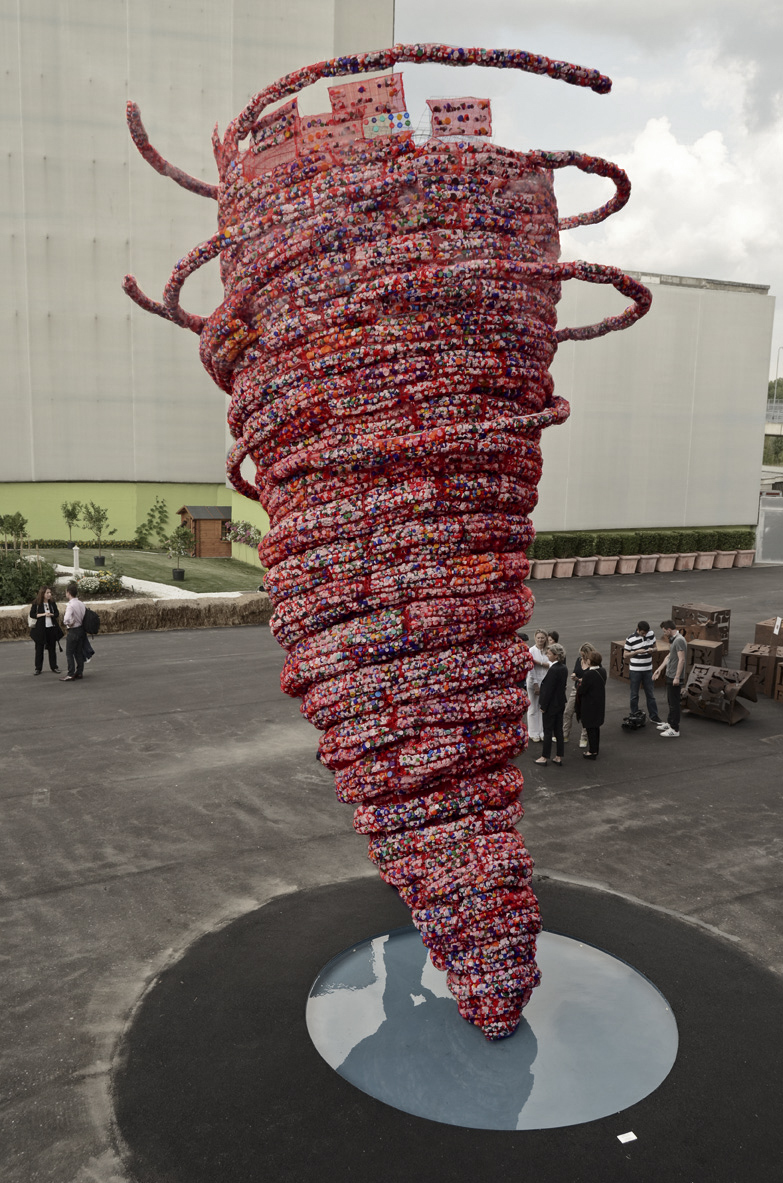
The Vortex, Milan, The Industrial Area of Bracco, 2015

From September to October 2014 the Garbage Patch State is hosted in the UN Secretariat of New York, place symbolizing peace, cooperation and development of all countries of the world.

Among the collateral events of Milan EXPO 2015, the artist has created a new installation "The Vortex", commissioned by Bracco Foundation. The Vortex is still nowadays part of the permanent collection of the Bracco Foundation.

On the same year, the hall of the High Level Conference Bluemed for climate in Venice has hosted a mysterious animal formed by plastic wastes from the oceans, the Bluemedsaurus.

Crawling through the masses of wastes of the world, the plastic snake reached Paris to show itself to the heads of states present for the Climate Conference COP 21.

The Wasteland cycle continues on the island of Mozia (Trapani), with a monumental installation that consists of five millions of plastic cups contained in metallic cages. The structure, seen from above, forms the word HELP.

In June 2018, for the World Oceans Day, Maria Cristina Finucci launches her lates work in a very special location. A new HELP appears in the Roman Forum, as a sign of alarm to the millions of tourists that visit the famous archeological place.

In April 2019, during the Milan Design Week FuoriSalone, the installation HELP has been exhibited in the courtyard of Milan State University as part of INTERNI Magazine's "Re-evolution" exhibition. In the main courtyard of the University, the writing "HELP" had a luminous effect that made it appear to be glowing like lava.

After Fuorisalone 2019, the fluorescent installation titled "What about the 8%?" was created for the Italian Institute of Culture in Los Angeles and serves as a thought-provoking exploration of ocean pollution caused by detergents. Designed for the patio of the Italian Institute of Culture in Los Angeles, the artwork replicates the surface of water, where dissolved detergents are vividly transformed by chemical reactants, resulting in an unnatural fluorescent effect. In the darkness, the detergent film on the ocean's surface cries out for help through the graffiti inscription "HELP."

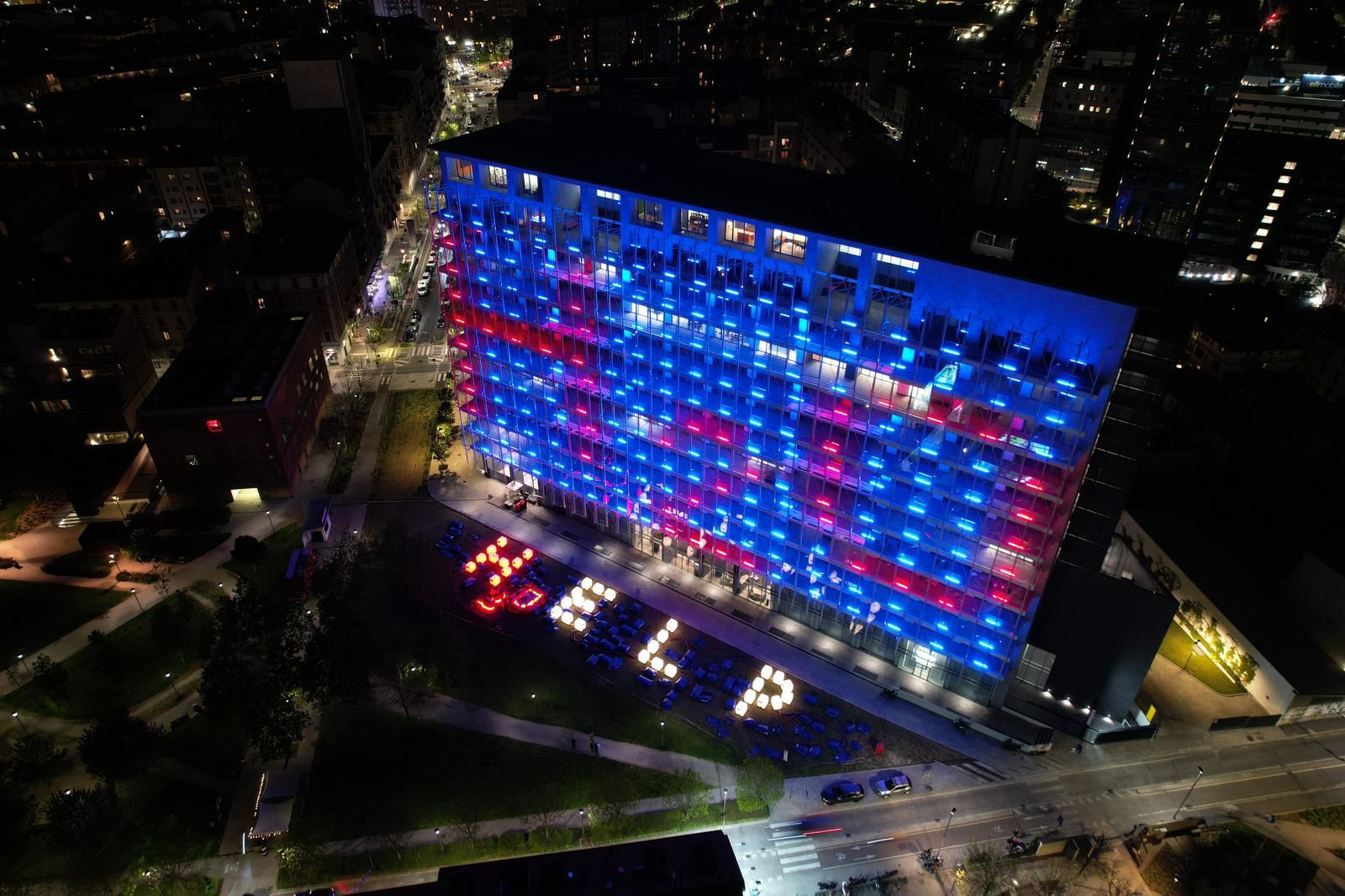
Fuorisalone 2023, Milan, H2o HELP

In April 2023, during Fuorisalone, the artist unveiled the installation "H2o Help", illuminating the Unipol building. This artwork delves into the urgent issue of ocean pollution and underscores the paramount importance of water conservation. The installation played a significant role in the exhibition, aligning seamlessly with the annual theme of INTERNI design re-evolution.

Stretching across the lawn for over 70 meters in front of the Unipol building, the installation's public message gained heightened visibility at night. A colossal H2O symbol stood out in the darkness against the building's façade, reinforcing the critical message of environmental responsibility and the need to safeguard our planet's precious water resources.

== Collaborations ==
Collaborators of this project have been academic institutions such as Ca' Foscari University of Venice, the universities La Sapienza and Roma Tre in Rome, and the European Institute of Design in Madrid. The project's main partners were ENI for the installations in Paris, Rome, and Venice and ENDESA for the installation in Madrid. Enel group and Enel X have been the sponsors of the HELP project in Rome together with Maccaferri Group. The Bracco Foundation has been supporting the Wasteland project in the events of Milan Expo 2015, and the Roman Forum. The foundation "Terzo Pilastro" has promoted the installation of HELP in Mozia.

== See also ==
- Marina DeBris
- Marine pollution
