= Great Pacific Garbage Patch =

Gyre of debris in the North Pacific

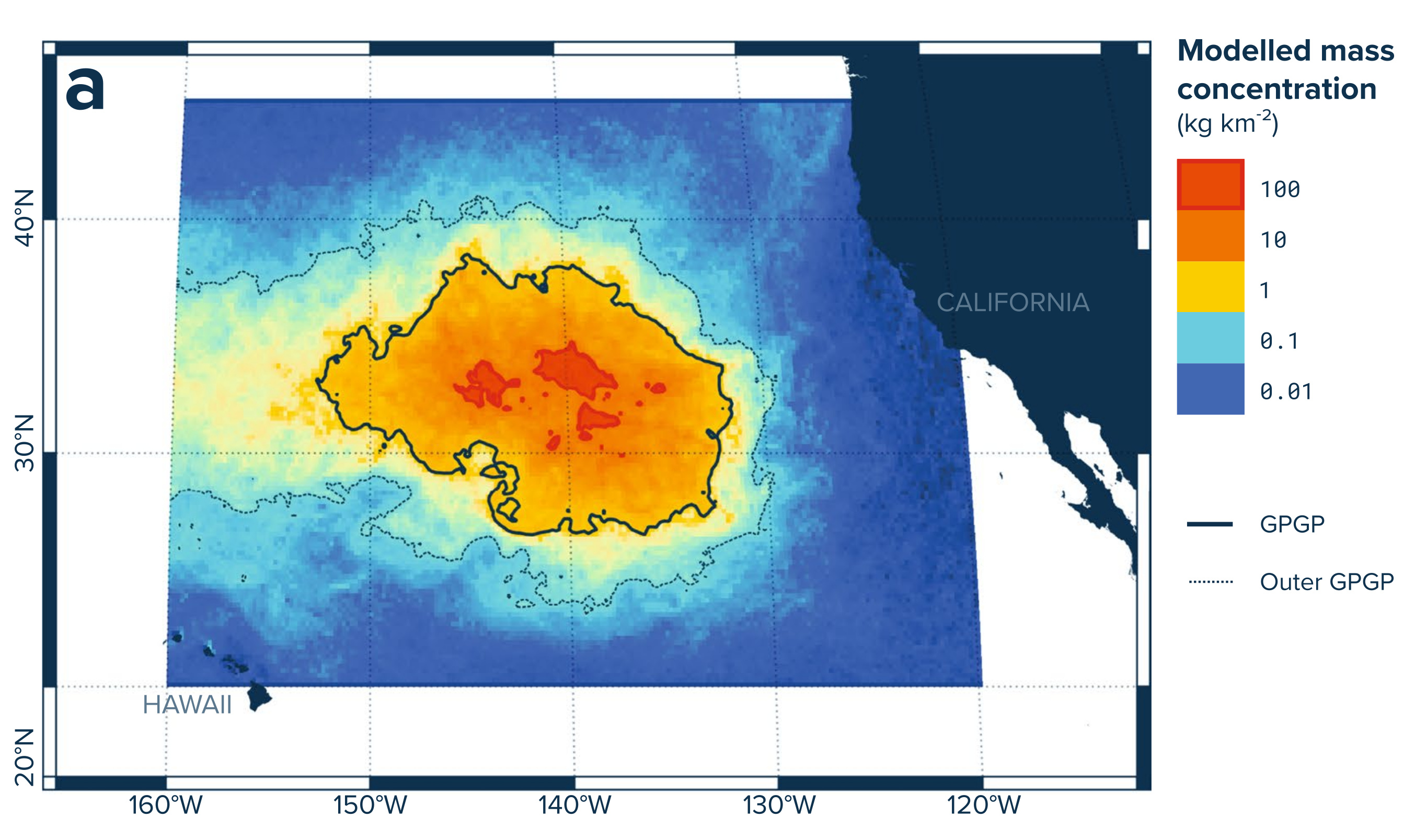
Great Pacific Garbage Patch in August 2015 (model)

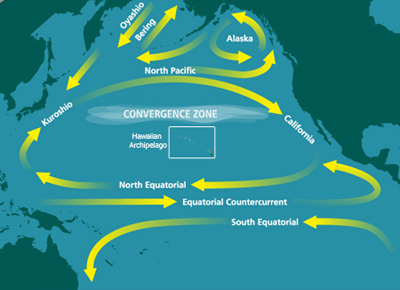
The patch is created in the gyre of the North Pacific Subtropical Convergence Zone.

The Great Pacific Garbage Patch (also Pacific trash vortex and North Pacific Garbage Patch) is a garbage patch, a gyre of marine debris particles, in the central North Pacific Ocean. It is located roughly from 135°W to 155°W and 35°N to 42°N. The collection of plastic and floating trash originates from the Pacific Rim, including countries in Asia, North America, and South America.

Despite the common public perception of the patch existing as giant islands of floating garbage, its low density (4 particles per cubic metre (3.1/yd^{3})) prevents detection by satellite imagery, or even by casual boaters or divers in the area. This is because the patch is a widely dispersed area consisting primarily of suspended "fingernail-sized or smaller"—often microscopic—particles in the upper water column known as microplastics.

Researchers from the Ocean Cleanup project claimed that the patch covers 1.6 million square kilometres (620,000 square miles) consisting of 45,000–129,000 tonnes (50,000–142,000 short tons) of plastic as of 2018, later growing to twice the size of Texas. By the end of 2024, the Ocean Cleanup had removed more than 500,000 kilograms (1,000,000 lb) of trash from the Great Pacific Garbage Patch, or 0.5% of the total accumulated trash. While microplastics dominate the area by count, 92% of the mass of the patch consists of larger objects. Some of the plastic is over 50 years old, and includes items (and fragments of items) such as "plastic lighters, toothbrushes, water bottles, pens, baby bottles, cell phones, plastic bags, and nurdles".

Research indicates that the patch is rapidly accumulating. The patch is believed to have increased "10-fold each decade" since 1945. The gyre contains approximately 3 kilograms (6 pounds) of plastic for each 500 g (1 lb) of plankton. A similar patch of floating plastic debris is found in the Atlantic Ocean, called the North Atlantic garbage patch.

== History ==
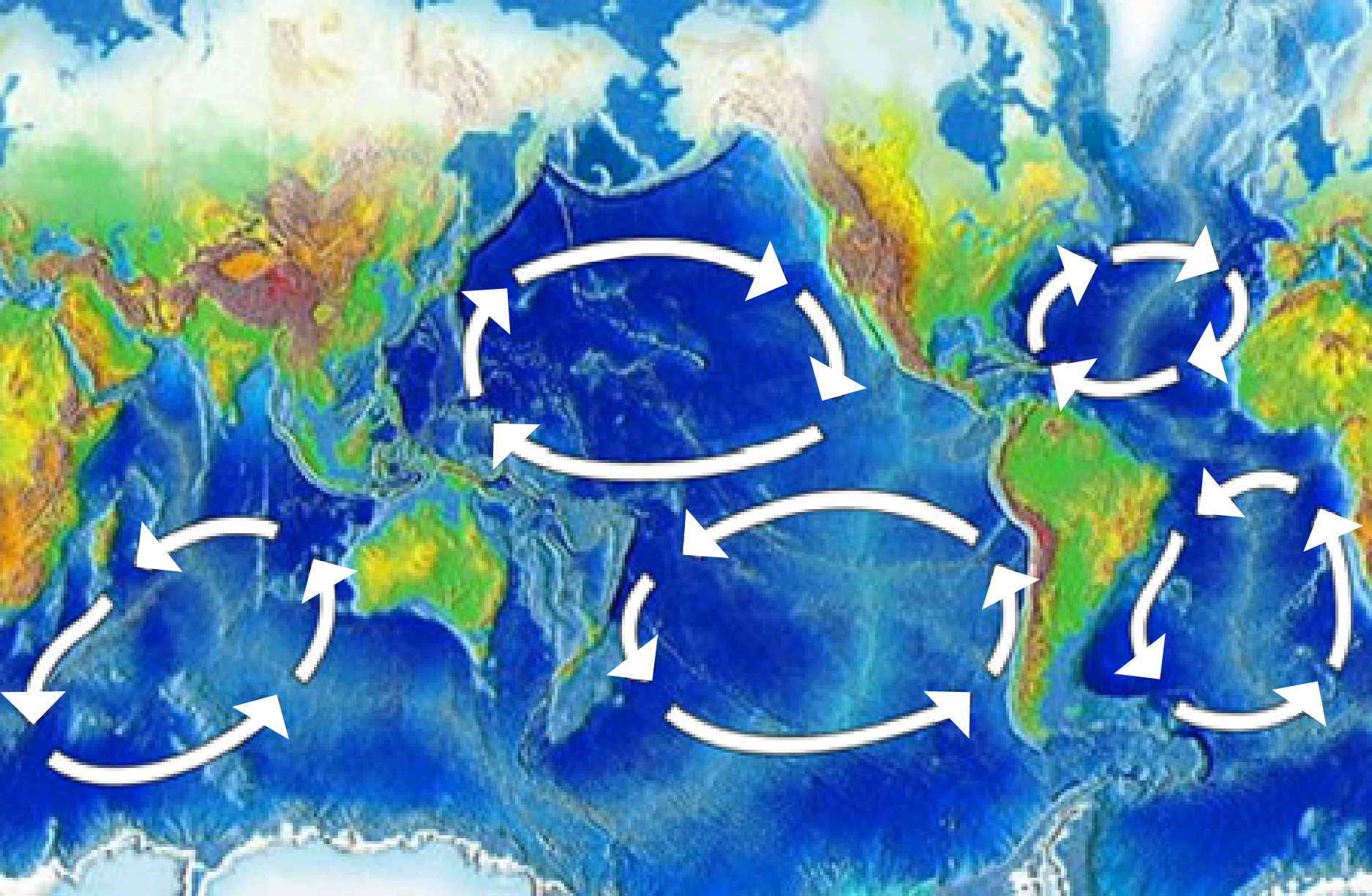
The area of increased plastic particles is located within the North Pacific Gyre, one of the five major ocean gyres.

The patch was predicted in a 1988 paper published by the National Oceanic and Atmospheric Administration (NOAA). The description was based on research by several Alaska-based researchers in 1988 who measured neustonic plastic in the North Pacific Ocean. Researchers found relatively high concentrations of marine debris accumulating in regions governed by ocean currents. Extrapolating from findings in the Sea of Japan, the researchers hypothesized that similar conditions would occur in other parts of the Pacific where prevailing currents were favorable to the creation of relatively stable waters. They specifically indicated the North Pacific Gyre.

Charles J. Moore, returning home through the North Pacific Gyre after competing in the Transpacific Yacht Race in 1997, claimed to have come upon an enormous stretch of floating debris. Moore alerted the oceanographer Curtis Ebbesmeyer, who subsequently dubbed the region the "Eastern Garbage Patch". The area is frequently featured in media reports as an exceptional example of marine pollution.

The JUNK Raft Project was a 2008 trans-Pacific sailing voyage made to highlight the plastic in the patch, organized by the Algalita Marine Research Foundation.

In 2009, two project vessels from Project Kaisei/Ocean Voyages Institute, the New Horizon and the Kaisei, embarked on a voyage to research the patch and determine the feasibility of commercial scale collection and recycling. The Scripps Institute of Oceanography's 2009 SEAPLEX expedition in part funded by Ocean Voyages Institute/Project Kaisei also researched the patch. Researchers were also looking at the impact of plastic on mesopelagic fish, such as lanternfish.

In 2010, Ocean Voyages Institute conducted a 30-day expedition in the gyre which continued the science from the 2009 expeditions and tested prototype cleanup devices.

In July/August 2012 Ocean Voyages Institute conducted a voyage from San Francisco to the Eastern limits of the North Pacific Gyre north, (ultimately ending in Richmond British Columbia) and then made a return voyage which also visited the Gyre. The focus on this expedition was surveying the extent of tsunami debris from the Japanese earthquake-tsunami.

== Sources of the plastic ==
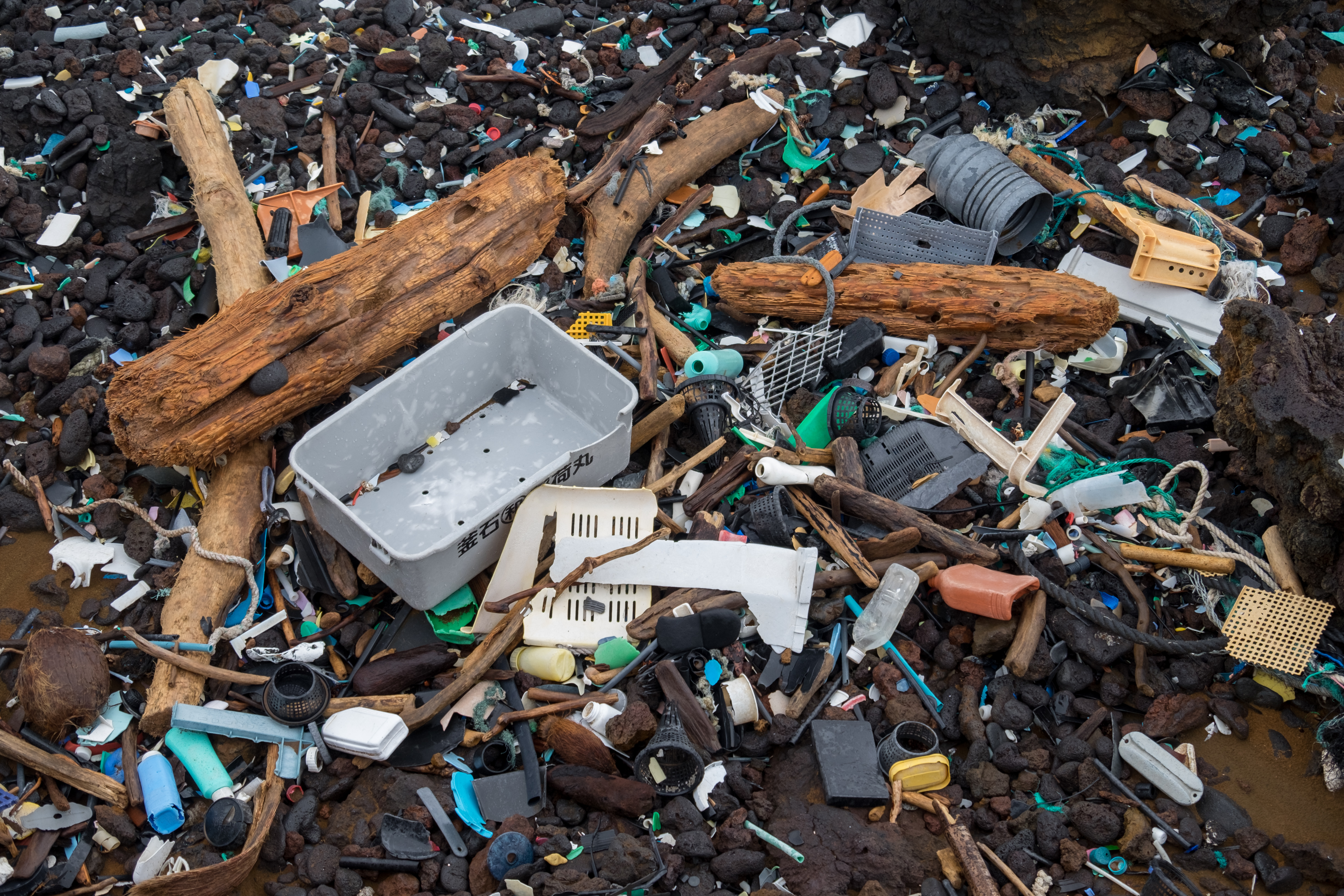
Debris from the Great Pacific Garbage Patch, washed ashore in Hawaii

In 2015, a study reported that the debris floats eastward out of Asian countries primarily from six countries: China, Indonesia, the Philippines, Vietnam, Sri Lanka and Thailand. The study – which used data as of 2010 – indicated that China was responsible for approximately 30% of plastic ocean pollution. In 2017, the Ocean Conservancy reported that China, Indonesia, Philippines, Thailand, and Vietnam dump more plastic in the sea than all other countries combined. Efforts to slow land generated debris and consequent marine debris accumulations have been undertaken by the Coastal Conservancy, Earth Day, Ocean Cleanup, and World Cleanup Day.

According to a 2019 study, "80 percent of plastic in the ocean is estimated to come from land-based sources, with the remaining 20 percent coming from boats and other marine sources. These percentages vary by region, however. A 2018 study reported that synthetic fishing nets made up nearly half the mass of the Great Pacific garbage patch, largely due to ocean current dynamics and increased fishing activity in the Pacific Ocean."

A 2022 study reported that 75% up to 86% of the plastic pollution is from fishing and agriculture with most identified emissions originating from Japan, China, South Korea, the US, and Taiwan. A 2020 study reported the U.S. as the third-largest contributor of plastic pollution in coastal environments. In 2018, China banned plastic imports. Thereafter, countries with poor waste management systems, such as Indonesia, became dumping grounds for plastic that originated in the US.

The study analysed 6,093 debris items greater than 5 cm found in the North Pacific garbage patch, of which 99% of the rigid items by count that represented 90% of the total debris mass (514 kg) were plastics. These were later sorted, counted, weighed and their sources traced back to five industrialised fishing nations, suggesting the important role the fishing industry plays in global plastic waste.

Predominantly, the composition of the hard plastic waste includes unidentifiable fragments, fishing and aquaculture gear such as nets, fish boxes, oyster spacers, and eel traps and other plastic items associated with food, drinks and household items. They also represent a substantial amount of accumulated floating plastic mass.

The 201 plastic objects analysed carried language writings with the most common languages identified as Chinese, Japanese, English and Korean, in that order.

The Ocean Cleanup estimated that as much as 86% of the plastics are from fishing activity.

== Constitution ==
The North Pacific Garbage Patch on a continuous ocean map

The Great Pacific Garbage Patch formed gradually as a result of ocean or marine pollution gathered by ocean currents. It occupies a relatively stationary region of the North Pacific Ocean bounded by the North Pacific Gyre in the horse latitudes. The gyre's rotational pattern draws in waste material from across the North Pacific, incorporating coastal waters off North America and Japan. As the material is captured in the currents, wind-driven surface currents gradually move debris toward the center, trapping it.

In a 2014 study researchers sampled 1571 locations throughout the world's oceans and determined that discarded fishing gear such as buoys, lines and nets accounted for more than 60% of the mass of plastic marine debris. According to a 2011 EPA report, "The primary source of marine debris is the improper waste disposal or management of trash and manufacturing products, including plastics (e.g., littering, illegal dumping) ... Debris is generated on land at marinas, ports, rivers, harbors, docks, and storm drains. Debris is generated at sea from fishing vessels, stationary platforms, and cargo ships." Constituents range in size from miles-long abandoned fishing nets to micro-pellets used in cosmetics and abrasive cleaners.

A computer model predicts that a hypothetical piece of debris from the U.S. west coast would head for Asia, and return to the U.S. in six years; debris from the east coast of Asia would reach the U.S. in a year or less. While microplastics make up 94% of the estimated 1.8 trillion plastic pieces, they amount to only 8% of the 79 thousand tonnes (87×10^{3} short tons) of plastic there, with most of the rest coming from the fishing industry.

A 2017 study concluded that of the 9.1 billion tonnes (10.0 billion short tons) of plastic produced since 1950, close to 7 billion tonnes (7.7×10^{9} short tons) are no longer in use. The authors estimate that 9% was recycled, 12% was incinerated, and the remaining 5.5 billion tonnes (6.1×10^{9} short tons) are in the oceans and land.

=== Animals ===
In a 2021 study, researchers who examined plastic from the patch identified more than 40 animal species on 90 percent of the debris they studied. Discovery of a thriving ecosystem of life at the Great Pacific Garbage Patch in 2022 suggested that cleaning up garbage here may adversely remove this plastisphere.

A 2023 study found that the plastic is home to coastal species surviving in the open ocean and reproducing. These coastal species, including jellyfish and sponges, are commonly found in the western Pacific coast and are surviving alongside open-ocean species on the plastic. Some scientists are concerned that this mix of coastal and open-ocean species may result in unnatural or "neopelagic communities," in which coastal creatures could be competing with or even consuming open-ocean species.

== Size estimates ==
Visualisation showing how mass accumulates in gyres.

The size of the patch is indefinite, as is the precise distribution of debris because large items are uncommon. Most debris consists of small plastic particles suspended at or just below the surface, evading detection by aircraft or satellite. Instead, the size of the patch is determined by sampling. The estimated size of the garbage patch is 1,600,000 square kilometres (620,000 mi^{2}) (about twice the size of Texas or three times the size of France). Such estimates, however, are conjectural given the complexities of sampling and the need to assess findings against other areas. Further, although the size of the patch is determined by a higher-than-normal degree of concentration of pelagic debris, there is no standard for determining the boundary between "normal" and "elevated" levels of pollutants to provide a firm estimate of the affected area.

Net-based surveys are less subjective than direct observations but are limited regarding the area that can be sampled (net apertures 1–2 metres (3 ft 3 in – 6 ft 7 in) and ships typically have to slow down to deploy nets, requiring dedicated ship's time). The plastic debris sampled is determined by net mesh size, with similar mesh sizes required to make meaningful comparisons among studies. Floating debris typically is sampled with a neuston or manta trawl net lined with 0.33 mm [0.013 in] mesh. Given the very high level of spatial clumping in marine litter, large numbers of net tows are required to adequately characterize the average abundance of litter at sea. Long-term changes in plastic meso-litter have been reported using surface net tows: in the North Pacific Subtropical Gyre in 1999, plastic abundance was 335,000 items per square kilometre (870,000/sq mi) and 5.1 kilograms per square kilometre (29 lb/sq mi), roughly an order of magnitude greater than samples collected in the 1980s. Similar dramatic increases in plastic debris have been reported off Japan. However, caution is needed in interpreting such findings, because of the problems of extreme spatial heterogeneity, and the need to compare samples from equivalent water masses, which is to say that, if an examination of the same parcel of water a week apart is conducted, an order of magnitude change in plastic concentration could be observed.

— Ryan et al.

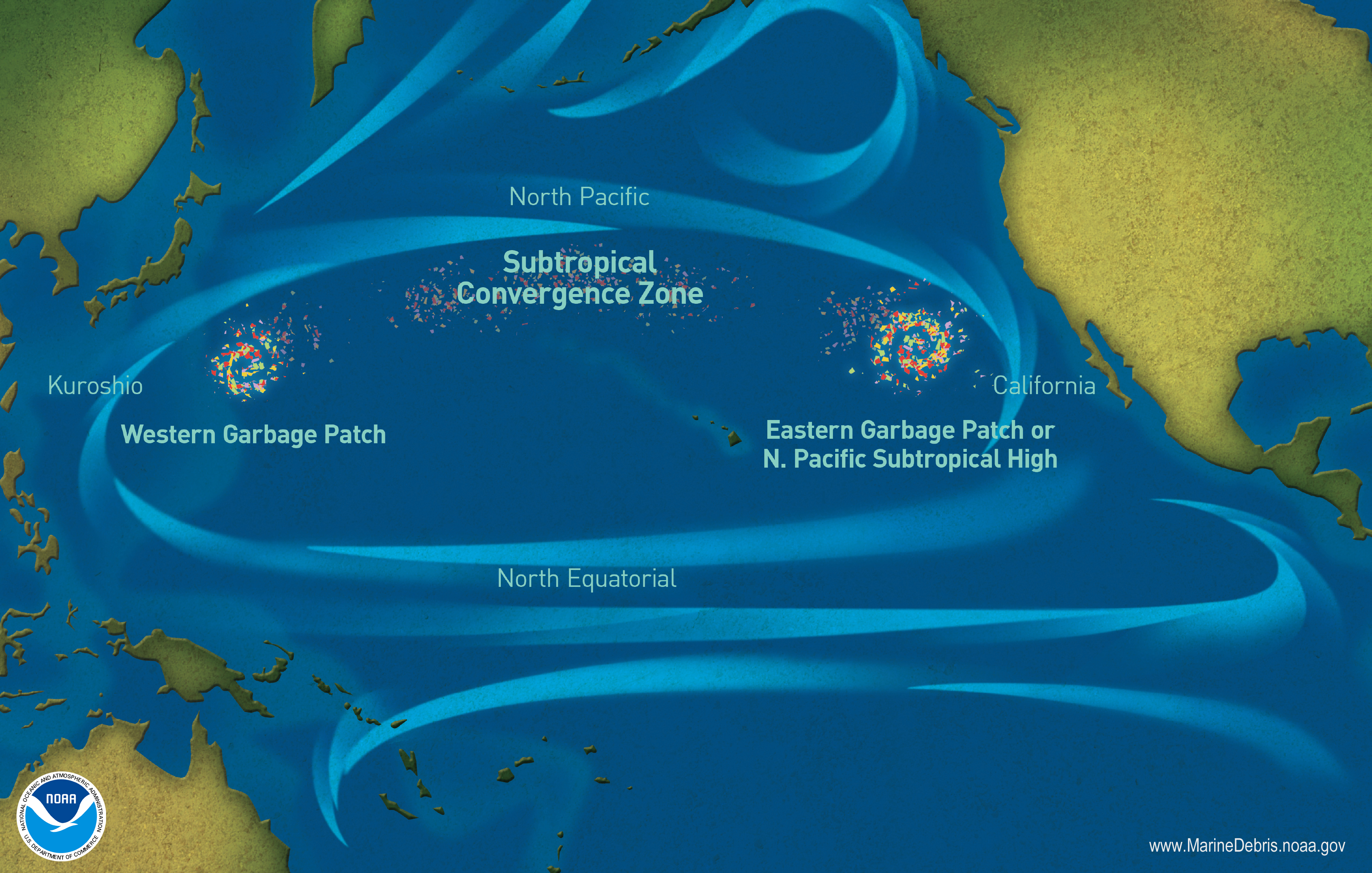
Pacific Ocean currents have created three "islands" of debris.

In August 2009, the Scripps Institution of Oceanography/Project Kaisei SEAPLEX survey mission of the Gyre found that plastic debris was present in 100 consecutive samples taken at varying depths and net sizes along a path of 2,700 kilometres (1,700 mi) through the patch. The survey found that, although the patch contains large pieces, it is on the whole made up of smaller items that increase in concentration toward the gyre's centre, and these 'confetti-like' pieces that are visible just beneath the surface suggests the affected area may be much smaller. Data collected in 2009 from Pacific albatross populations suggest the presence of two distinct debris zones.

In March 2018, the Ocean Cleanup published a paper summarizing their findings from the Mega- (2015) and Aerial Expedition (2016). In 2015, the organization crossed the Great Pacific Garbage Patch with 30 vessels, to make observations and take samples with 652 survey nets. They collected a total of 1.2 million pieces, which they counted and categorized into their respective size classes. In order to also account for the larger, but more rare debris, they also overflew the patch in 2016 with a C-130 Hercules aircraft, equipped with LiDAR sensors. The findings from the two expeditions, found that the patch covers 1.6 million square kilometres (0.62 million square miles) with a concentration of 10–100 kilograms per square kilometre (57–571 lb/sq mi). They estimate an 80,000 metric tons (88,000 short tons) in the patch, with 1.8 trillion plastic pieces, out of which 92% of the mass is to be found in objects larger than 0.5 centimetres (3/16 in).

In a 2001 study, researchers found concentrations of plastic particles at 334,721 pieces per square kilometre (866,920/sq mi) with a mean mass of 5.1 kilograms per square kilometre (29 lb/sq mi), in the neuston. The overall concentration of plastics was seven times greater than the concentration of zooplankton in many of the sampled areas. Samples collected deeper in the water column found much lower concentrations of plastic particles (primarily monofilament fishing line pieces). In 2012, researchers Goldstein, Rosenberg and Cheng found that microplastic concentrations in the gyre had increased by two orders of magnitude in the prior four decades.

On 11 April 2013, artist Maria Cristina Finucci founded The Garbage Patch State at UNESCO – Paris in front of Director General Irina Bokova. In March 2018, New Scientist published the prediction that the size was approximately 1.6 million square kilometers.

=== Misconceptions ===
The term "Great Pacific Garbage Patch" has been used to describe the accumulation of marine debris, but the name can give a misleading impression of its nature and appearance. NOAA stated:

While "Great Pacific Garbage Patch" is a term often used by the media, it does not paint an accurate picture of the marine debris problem in the North Pacific Ocean. The name "Pacific Garbage Patch" has led many to believe that this area is a large and continuous patch of easily visible marine debris items such as bottles and other litter – akin to a literal island of trash that should be visible with satellite or aerial photographs. This is not the case.

— Ocean Facts, National Ocean Service

Further contrary to popular belief, the Great Pacific Garbage Patch cannot be seen from space.

The "island" characterization has appeared in media coverage of the patch. In 2010, Vice published an article titled "Garbage Island: The Vortex Where Our Stuff Goes To Not Really Die", which described the Great Pacific Garbage Patch as a "Texas-sized" island of junk and referred to a "gigantic floating island of refuse".

In a 2016 article for Slate, Daniel Engber discussed the misconception that the Great Pacific Garbage Patch is a giant floating island of garbage and described how the image differs from the actual nature of the marine debris accumulation.

In 2018, Vice reported on photographer Chris Jordan's search for the supposed island and his discovery that it did not exist in the form of a single island.

== Environmental effects ==
In 2010, a conference at the Institute of Electrical and Electronics Engineers (IEEE) argued that whilst the patch posed a threat to the living conditions of mankind, it was controllable. In a conference at the IEEE in the following year, it was argued that the patch disrupts the balance of the original marine ecosystem and provides microorganisms with new biological conditions, leading to the development of a new ecosystem.

== Debris removal efforts ==
=== Ocean Voyages Institute's Project Kaisei ===
In 2009, Ocean Voyages Institute removed over 5 short tons (4.5 t) of plastic during the initial Project Kaisei cleanup initiative while testing a variety of cleanup prototype devices. In 2019, over a 25-day expedition, Ocean Voyages Institute set the record for largest cleanup in the garbage patch, removing over 40 metric tons (44 short tons) of plastic from the ocean. In 2020, over the course of two expeditions, Ocean Voyages Institute again set the record for the largest cleanup removing 170 short tons (150 t; 340,000 lb) of plastic from the ocean. The first 45-day expedition removed 103 short tons (93 t; 206,000 lb) of plastic and the second expedition removed 67 short tons (61 t) of plastic from the garbage patch. In 2022, over the course of 2 summer expeditions, Ocean Voyages Institute removed 148 short tons (134 t; 296,000 lb) of plastic ghost nets, consumer items and mixed plastic debris from the garbage patch.

=== The Ocean Cleanup ===
On 9 September 2018, the first collection system was deployed to the gyre to begin the collection task. This initial trial run of the Ocean Cleanup Project started towing its "Ocean Cleanup System 001" from San Francisco to a trial site some 240 nautical miles (440 km; 280 mi) away. The initial trial of the "Ocean Cleanup System 001" ran for four months and provided the research team with valuable information relevant to the designing of the "System 001/B".

In 2021, the Ocean Cleanup collected 63,182 pounds (28,659 kg; 31.591 short tons; 28.659 t) of plastic using their "System 002". The mission started in July 2021 and concluded on 14 October 2021. In July 2022, the Ocean Cleanup announced that they had reached a milestone of removing the first 100,000 kilograms (220,000 lb; 100 t; 110 short tons) of plastic from the Great Pacific Garbage Patch using "System 002" and announced its transition to "System 03", which is claimed to be 10 times as effective as its predecessor. In April 2024, they celebrated a milestone of 10 million kg of trash extracted and just 7 months later (November 2024), they have reached 20 million kg of trash removed.

=== Other removal efforts ===
The 2012 Algalita/5 Gyres Asia Pacific Expedition began in the Marshall Islands on 1 May, investigated the patch, collecting samples for the 5 Gyres Institute, Algalita Marine Research Foundation, and several other institutions, including NOAA, Scripps, IPRC and Woods Hole Oceanographic Institute. In 2012, the Sea Education Association conducted research expeditions in the gyre. The expeditions conducted 118 tows and counted nearly 70,000 pieces of plastic.

== See also ==
- Ecosystem of the North Pacific Subtropical Gyre
- Indian Ocean garbage patch
- North Atlantic garbage patch
- Ocean Conservancy
- Plastisphere
- South Pacific garbage patch
- World Cleanup Day
