= RuckusRoots =

Arts-related nonprofit

RuckusRoots is a 501(c)(3) nonprofit organization which brings sustainable art education programs to teens and young adults. It is centered in Los Angeles, California and was founded in 2009 by University of Colorado Boulder graduate Christine Spehar. The aim of the organization is to help young people see art as a tool for eco- activism and to take a part in building a sustainable future.

RuckusRoots' fundamental approach is to provide collaborative, hands-on experience to young people and their surrounding community. RuckusRoots teams up with artists and organizations to use "found object art" to promote sustainable living. Its programs are funded through sponsorship, donations, volunteer efforts, and fundraising events.

In 2012 they teamed up with Marina DeBris to produce a Trashion show to benefit arts education for low income teens in East LA. In 2010, Ruckus Roots partnered with the University of Wisconsin-Oshkosh to develop TrashFormation, an event to educate about art sustainability, a program that has since been repeated successfully in Los Angeles area schools. The UW Oshkosh and Ruckus Roots also teamed up for an Earth Week event demonstrating the benefits of bicycling. Another typical activity for Ruckus Roots is participating in trash education video events.
