= Marina DeBris =

Pseudonymous Australian artist who works with trash from oceans and beaches

- Dress made by Marina DeBris from trash found on the beach
- Born: Detroit, Michigan
- Education: Indiana University; Rhode Island School of Design
- Awards: Allens People's Choice Award 2017 Sculpture By the Sea; Sydney Water Environmental Sculpture Subsidy; Waverley Council Mayor's Prize
- Website: http://www.washedup.us/

Marina DeBris is the name used by an Australian-based artist whose work focuses on reusing trash to raise awareness of ocean and beach pollution. DeBris, who is one of the longest standing practitioners of trashion, uses trash washed up from the beach to create trashion. As well as creating art from debris, DeBris also is a fund raiser for environmental organisations, and collaborates with non-profit organisations and schools to educate children about ocean pollution. In 2021, DeBris found almost 300 face masks on beaches, and used them in her trashion and other displays.

DeBris is also a social activist. In 2011 she participated in a panel on how artists can contribute to environmental public policy, promote clean energy and curate Ecological art exhibitions. DeBris has worked with non profits to raise funds for art education. DeBris is listed with the Women Environmental Artists Directory.

DeBris is recognised as a spokesperson on the negative effects of plastics in fashion.

== Education and personal life ==
DeBris was educated at Indiana University and the Rhode Island School of Design. She has lived and worked in New York City, London, England, and Sydney, Australia. She was born in Detroit, had lived in Los Angeles, and currently lives in Australia.

== Genre and venues ==
Works by DeBris are often displayed in galleries, featured in a live performance about ocean waste, included in a maritime museum, Sculpture by the Sea, featured in magazines, included in science events, included in the Smithsonian Institution's Washed Ashore Project, included in the Ocean Lovers Festival, and has been used by organisations such as the United Nations as awards. Her works are also displayed in venues not typically thought of as galleries, but are art venues nonetheless, such as retail venues, Burning Man, a trasher's ball, a downtown art walk, an Earth Day creek spring clean-up, and an Environmental & Animal Justice Exhibit. Marina's Inconvenience Store has won three awards at the 2017 Sculpture by the Sea and is now a travelling exhibition. Marina is included in the Bondi Story Room, which is owned and managed by the Waverley Council.

DeBris also partners or works with various anti-pollution organisations, such as Friends of Ballona Wetlands, 5 Gyres, RuckusRoots, the United Nations Special Assembly on Climate Change Heal the Bay and other organisations, such as Aquarium of the Pacific. Marina DeBris has also designed accessories for Captain Charles J. Moore, who worked to bring attention to the Great Pacific Garbage Patch. DeBris' work with the United Nations Special Assembly was a collaboration with actress/poet Sheryl Lee, dancer Maya Gabay, and musician Marla Leigh.

DeBris also partnered with an office building, MLC Centre, to highlight the problems of throwaway coffee cups. The MLC Centre hosted her work "Disposable Truths" created from used throwaway coffee cups.

Her work was also featured in an article about World Ocean Day.

== Awards ==
DeBris's "Inconvenience Store" was a joint recipients of the Allens People's Choice Award at the 2017 Sculpture By the Sea. The "Inconvenience Store" was also awarded with the Sydney Water Environmental Sculpture Subsidy for her work on water pollution and consumption, and won the Waverley Council Mayor's Prize. Marina also won the Helen Lempriere Scholarship. Marina was also a 2016 Waverley Council studio artist.
