= Trashion =

Fashion made with trash

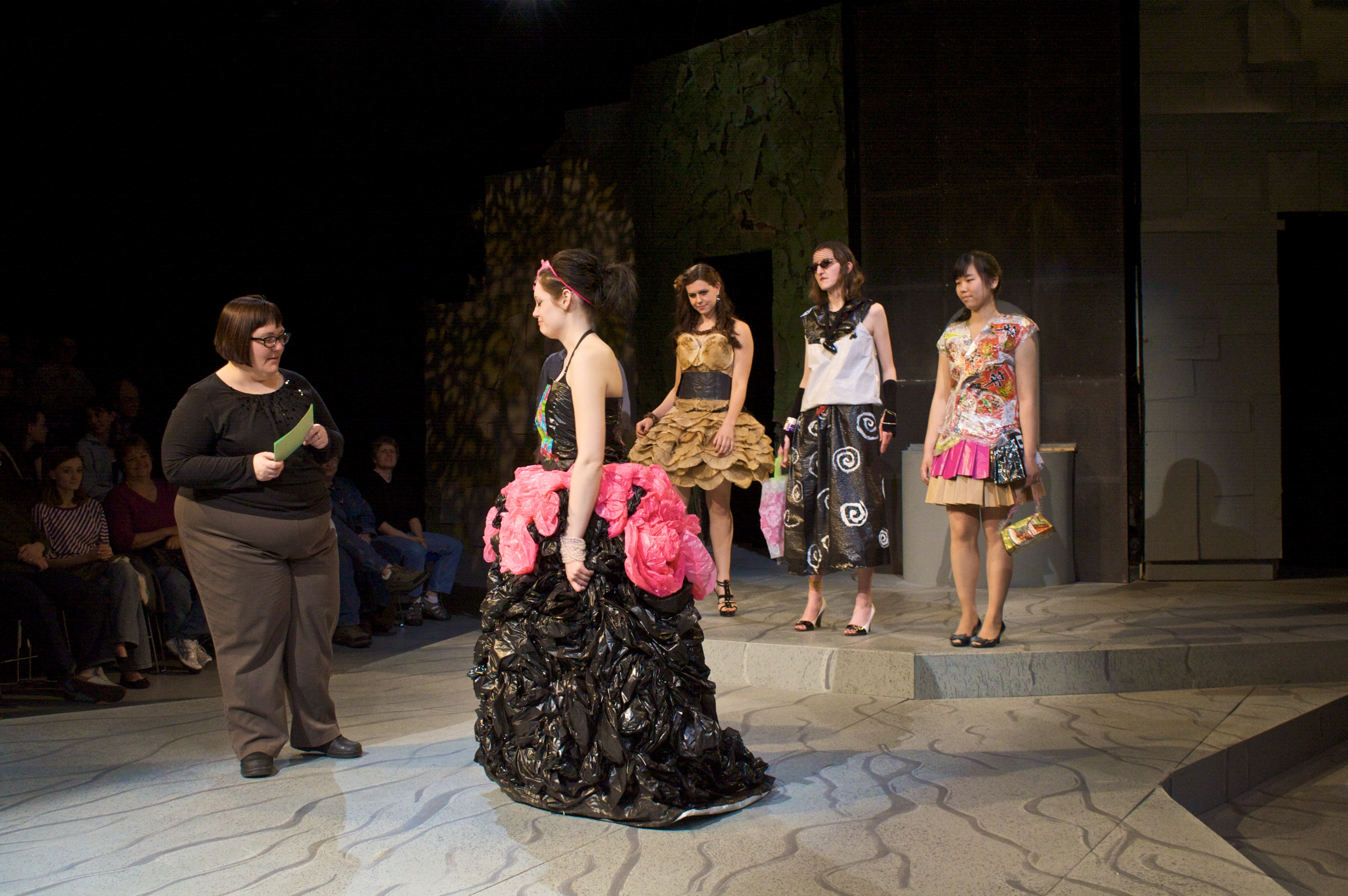
A 2010 trashion fashion show held at the University of Minnesota Morris.

Trashion (a portmanteau of trash and fashion) is a term for clothing and accessories created from used, thrown-out, found, and repurposed elements. The term was coined in New Zealand in 2004 and increased in usage through 2005. Trashion is a subgenre of found object art, using objects that already have some other defined purpose, and turning them into art.

Initially, trashion was used to describe art-couture costume usually linked to contests or fashion shows; however, as recycling and 'green' fashion have become more prevalent, trashion has taken a turn for the more wearable. The term is now widely used in creative circles to describe any wearable item or accessory that is constructed using all or part recycled materials, including clothing that has been thrifted and reconditioned.

== Philosophy ==
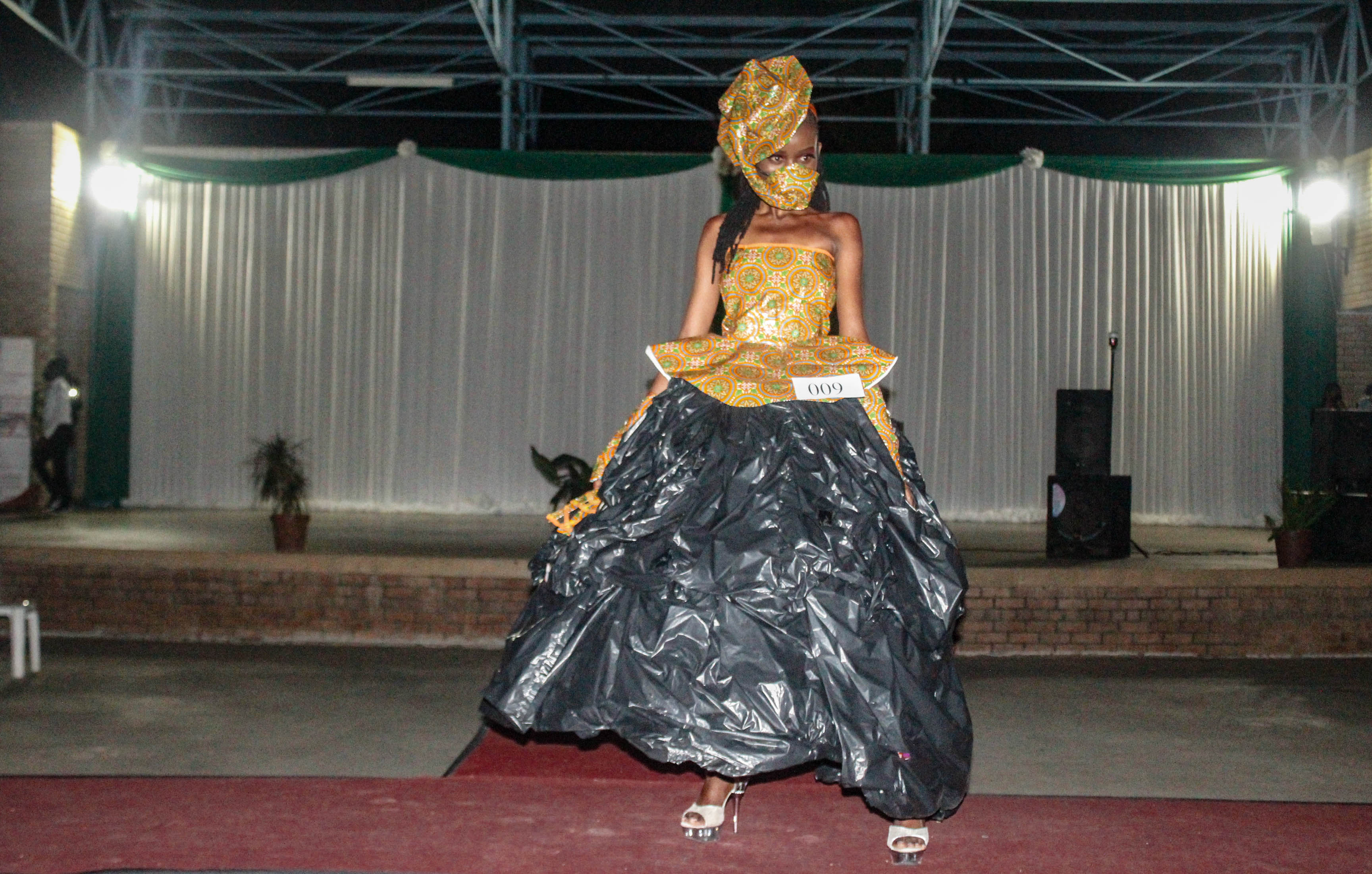
A woman in Ghana wearing a dress made of repurposed waste.

Trashion is a philosophy and an ethic encompassing environmentalism and innovation. Making traditional objects out of recycled materials can be trashion, as can making avant-garde fashion from cast-offs or junk. It springs from a desire to make the best use of limited resources. Trashion is similar to upcycling and refashion, although it began with specific fashion aspirations. Like upcycling, trashion generates items that are valued again, but these items may be either low-cost or high-cost. The environmental aim of trashion is to call attention to and reduce the polluting outcome of fashion waste.

== History ==
Trashion has become a style of art since the 1990s. Trashion is also the subject of school projects, local fashion shows, community center exhibits, and fundraisers, among other purposes. Some contemporary trashion artists include Marina DeBris and Nancy Judd.

== See also ==
- The Horn of Plenty, a fashion collection by Alexander McQueen visually inspired by trash
