= CleanHub =

Berlin-based environmental technology company

- Type: Private
- Industry: Environmental technology, Waste management, Sustainability
- Founded: 2020; 6 years ago
- Founder: Joel Tasche, Bosse Rothe and Florin Dinga
- Headquarters: Berlin, Germany
- Area served: Global (focus on coastal regions in Asia, Africa, and Central America)
- Key people: Joel Tasche (co-founder and CEO), Louis Pfitzner (co-CEO)
- Services: Plastic waste collection, Plastic credit certification, end-to-end traceability
- Website: cleanhub.com

CleanHub is a Berlin-based environmental technology company focused on plastic waste collection and processing in coastal regions. It partners with consumer brands that fund waste recovery efforts through a plastic credits model.

== History ==
CleanHub was founded by Joel Tasche, Bosse Rothe, and Florin Dinga in 2020. The company was established to develop systems to reduce ocean-bound plastic waste. The service focuses on collecting plastic waste at the source, preventing it from being dumped.

In 2021, CleanHub introduced a digital waste traceability platform to monitor plastic collection. The software records each kilogram of waste from collection to disposal, using QR codes, mobile data uploads and geo-data, and is intended to support third-party audits and real-time tracking. In June of the same year, CleanHub raised just under €4 million in a seed funding round from Lakestar Ventures and 468 Capital.

CleanHub's tracking system documents each collection with photos uploaded at every step, which are analysed using artificial intelligence to check weight, condition and GPS data. The system was designed to improve documentation and monitoring of plastic waste recovery.

In January 2023, Louis Pfitzner joined as co-CEO, and CleanHub's plastic credit system was verified by TÜV SÜD according to the ISO 14064-3 standard. The verification was renewed in January 2025.

In June 2023, the company raised €6.4 million in a funding round led by Integra Partners and Lakestar.

In October 2023, the company was named "Startup of the Week" by WirtschaftsWoche.

In July 2024, CleanHub and TÜV SÜD launched a certification program intended to help brands comply with the European Union's Empowering Consumers for the Green Transition (EmpCo) directive. The company also introduced Eddy, track-and-trace software that digitizes waste-stream data for supply chain traceability.

== Memberships and recognitions ==
In September 2023, CleanHub was selected as a Top Innovator by UpLink, the World Economic Forum's open innovation platform.

In 2024, the Clinton Global Initiative highlighted CleanHub's work on preventing plastic pollution in coastal regions. In December 2024, CleanHub received funding from the European Regional Development Fund (ERDF) to scale AI-based waste analysis and expand waste recovery facilities.

In 2024, CleanHub said it had collected more than 8,000 metric tons of plastic waste in areas lacking formal waste management infrastructure.

According to the company, as of 2025 it had worked with over 500 brands to support waste collection programs in countries including India, Indonesia, Tanzania, and Guatemala.
