= Uplink (disambiguation) =

An uplink is a telecommunications link.

Uplink may refer to:

- UpLink, the open-innovation platform of the World Economic Forum
- Uplink (video game), a 2001 "hacking simulation" video game released by Introversion Software
- Half-Life: Uplink, a 1998 demo version of the Half-Life video game
