= Plastic credit =

A plastic credit is a transferable unit representing a specific quantity of plastic that is collected and managed or recycled as a result of project activity.

This is a market-based instrument that allows individuals, organizations, and companies to finance the recovery of plastic waste for underfinanced waste management in many parts of the world. Designed as an outcome-based financing mechanism, plastic credits are earned by verifying the removal or collection of a specific quantity of plastic from the environment, typically measured in kilograms or tonnes. The system aims to address the growing global challenge of plastic pollution by channeling private sector investment into waste management infrastructure, particularly in regions where such systems are underdeveloped or non-existent.

== History ==
The concept of plastic credits emerged in the late 2010s, inspired by the structure of carbon credits used in climate finance. As global awareness of plastic pollution intensified, particularly after the release of studies and documentaries on ocean plastics, there was a growing demand for scalable, traceable services. Organizations such as Plastic Bank and Verra began exploring credit-based approaches, and by the early 2020s, several third-party standards and registries were established to verify and certify plastic credit projects.

The plastic credit market gained momentum with support from international sustainability frameworks, including the Ellen MacArthur Foundation's New Plastics Economy and initiatives under the United Nations Environment Programme. CleanHub, Repurpose Global, and other actors entered the space, further standardizing credit issuance and audit practices.

== Operations ==
A plastic credit corresponds to one kilogram of plastic waste that has been collected and properly processed—whether through recycling, co‑processing or safe disposal—under a third‑party‑certified project. Projects register with a recognized standard and undergo regular, independent audits to verify collection volumes and processing methods. Detailed documentation—including photographs, GPS coordinates and weight records—is maintained to substantiate each kilogram of waste managed. Verified credits are then issued on a public registry, where each can be tracked through issuance, transfer and eventual retirement. When an end‑user acquires and retires credits to offset their plastic footprint, the registry marks those credits as used, preventing double‑counting and ensuring full traceability and auditability.

The plastic credit market remains in its early stages relative to established carbon markets but is evolving quickly. Growth is driven by corporate sustainability commitments, the emergence of NGO- and startup‑led credit registries and marketplaces, and rising consumer and regulatory pressure. Collaborative initiatives and partnerships among stakeholders across the value chain are increasingly common.

Typical buyers include multinational consumer goods companies, sustainable product brands and event organizers, while credits are supplied by certified waste management operators, often located in emerging markets. The global plastic credit market is projected to grow at a compound annual growth rate of 121 percent between 2025 and 2033, reaching an estimated value of USD 6.83 billion by 2033.

== TÜV SÜD plastic credits ==
TÜV SÜD, a certification body based in Germany, developed its plastic credit standard.

Their standard provides:

- Clear criteria for plastic waste collection, sorting, processing, and credit issuance.
- Independent verification through on-site audits and data reviews to ensure waste is collected and treated according to the approved methodology.
- Blockchain-based tracking systems in some implementations, enhancing transparency and minimizing fraud or double counting.
- Publicly available certification documents, including detailed credit issuance reports.

TÜV SÜD credits are used by multinationals and investors for environmental claims, supported by the company's established expertise in industrial auditing and ISO certification. The system also enables co‑processing and recovery of plastic waste from challenging contexts—such as coastal areas and informal waste streams—under the same verification framework.

Clean-tech startup CleanHub became the first TÜV SÜD-verified system for plastic credits in 2023 according to the ISO 14064-3 standard.

== Benefits ==
Plastic credits offer a range of environmental, social, and economic benefits:

- Outcome-based financing: Money flows only after verified waste recovery, ensuring performance.
- Waste infrastructure investment: Projects fund new or expanded collection systems in underserved areas.
- Local economic empowerment: Jobs are created for waste workers, often in informal sectors.
- Corporate accountability: Enables companies to take responsibility for their plastic footprint transparently.
- Traceable and auditable: Advanced digital tracking, public registries, and third-party audits ensure credibility.

== Criticisms ==
Despite their promise, plastic credits face several challenges.

- Additionality concerns: Ensuring that credited activities would not have happened without the credit revenue.
- Market regulation: The lack of universal standards can lead to inconsistencies.
- Risk of offsetting mindset: Critics argue credits should not replace upstream efforts like reduction or reuse.

Critics have questioned the effectiveness of plastic credits as a means of reducing plastic pollution. Sian Sutherland, co-founder of the campaign group A Plastic Planet, described plastic credits as "about as much use as a chocolate fireguard" and a "palatable panacea" that allows large polluters to avoid reducing their own plastic use.

Zoë Lenkiewicz, founder of Global Waste Lab, which helps teams across the global south to "democratise waste wisdom" notes there are good schemes and bad. She cites CleanHub and Plastics 4 Change as two examples of those that are "community first" and develop long-term relationships, with a focus on workers' rights and protections. Transparency is high and there is "no bullshit", she adds.

== See also ==
- Carbon credit
- Circular economy
- Waste management
- Marine plastic pollution
