= Marine plastic pollution =

Environmental pollution by plastics

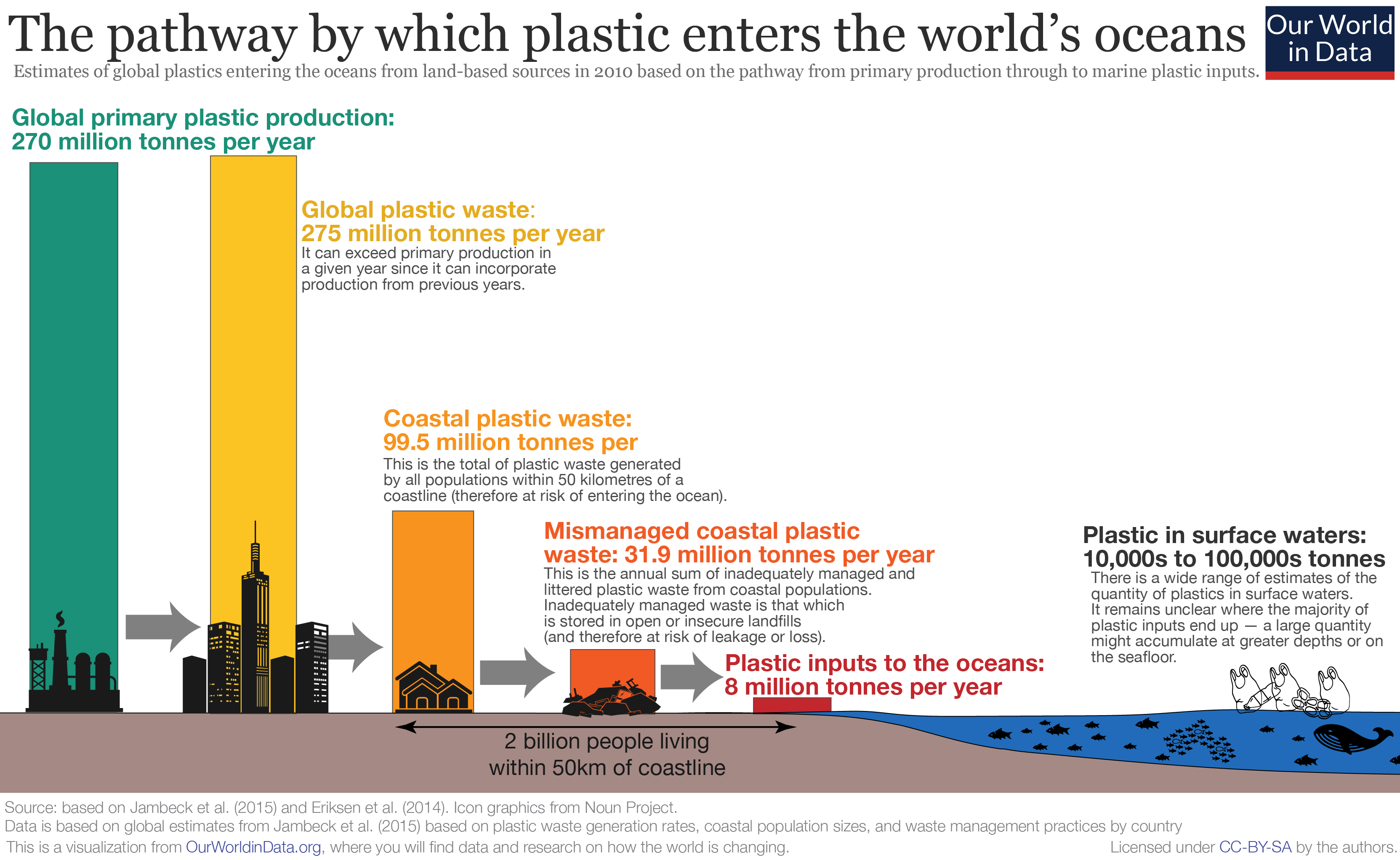
The pathway by which plastics enters the world's oceans

Marine plastic pollution is a type of marine pollution caused by plastics ranging in size from large original material such as bottles and bags, down to microplastics formed from the fragmentation of plastic material. Marine debris is mainly discarded human rubbish which floats on, or is suspended in the ocean. Eighty percent of marine debris is plastic. Microplastics and nanoplastics result from the breakdown or photodegradation of plastic waste in surface waters, rivers or oceans. Recently, scientists have uncovered nanoplastics in heavy snow, more specifically about 3,000 tons that cover Switzerland yearly.

It is estimated that there is a stock of 86 million tons of plastic marine debris in the worldwide ocean as of the end of 2013, assuming that 1.4% of global plastics produced from 1950 to 2013 has entered the ocean and has accumulated there. Global consumption of plastics is estimated to be 300 million tonnes per year as of 2022, with around 8 million tonnes ending up in the oceans as macroplastics. Approximately 1.5 million tonnes of primary microplastics end up in the seas. Around 98% of this volume is created by land-based activities, with the remaining 2% being generated by sea-based activities. It is estimated that 19–23 million tonnes of plastic leaks into aquatic ecosystems annually. The 2017 United Nations Ocean Conference estimated that the oceans might contain more weight in plastics than fish by the year 2050.

Oceans are polluted by plastic particles ranging in size from large original material such as bottles and bags, down to microplastics formed from the fragmentation of plastic material. This material is only very slowly degraded or removed from the ocean so plastic particles are now widespread throughout the surface ocean and are known to be having deleterious effects on marine life. Discarded plastic bags, six-pack rings, cigarette butts and other forms of plastic waste which finish up in the ocean present dangers to wildlife and fisheries. Aquatic life can be threatened through entanglement, suffocation, and ingestion. Fishing nets, usually made of plastic, can be left or lost in the ocean by fishermen. Known as ghost nets, these entangle fish, dolphins, sea turtles, sharks, dugongs, crocodiles, seabirds, crabs, and other creatures, restricting movement, causing starvation, laceration, infection, and, in those that need to return to the surface to breathe, suffocation. There are various types of ocean plastics causing problems to marine life. Bottle caps have been found in the stomachs of turtles and seabirds, which have died because of the obstruction of their respiratory and digestive tracts. Ghost nets are also a problematic type of ocean plastic as they can continuously trap marine life in a process known as "ghost fishing".

The 10 largest emitters of oceanic plastic pollution worldwide are, from the most to the least, China, Indonesia, Philippines, Vietnam, Sri Lanka, Thailand, Egypt, Malaysia, Nigeria, and Bangladesh, largely through the Yangtze, Indus, Yellow River, Huai He, Nile, Ganges, Pearl River, Amur, Niger, and Mekong, and accounting for "90 percent of all the plastic that reaches the world's oceans". Asia was the leading source of mismanaged plastic waste, with China alone accounting for 2.4 million metric tons. The Ocean Conservancy has reported that China, Indonesia, Philippines, Thailand, and Vietnam dump more plastic in the sea than all other countries combined.

Plastics accumulate because they do not biodegrade in the way many other substances do. They will photodegrade on exposure to the sun, but they do so properly only under dry conditions, and water inhibits this process. In marine environments, photo-degraded plastic disintegrates into ever-smaller pieces while remaining polymers, even down to the molecular level. When floating plastic particles photodegrade down to zooplankton sizes, jellyfish attempt to consume them, and in this way the plastic enters the ocean food chain.

Solutions to marine plastic pollution, along with plastic pollution within the whole environment will be intertwined with changes in manufacturing and packaging practices, and a reduction in the usage, in particular, of single or short-lived plastic products. Many ideas exist for cleaning up plastic in the oceans including trapping plastic particles at river mouths before entering the ocean, and cleaning up the ocean gyres.

== Scope of the problem ==
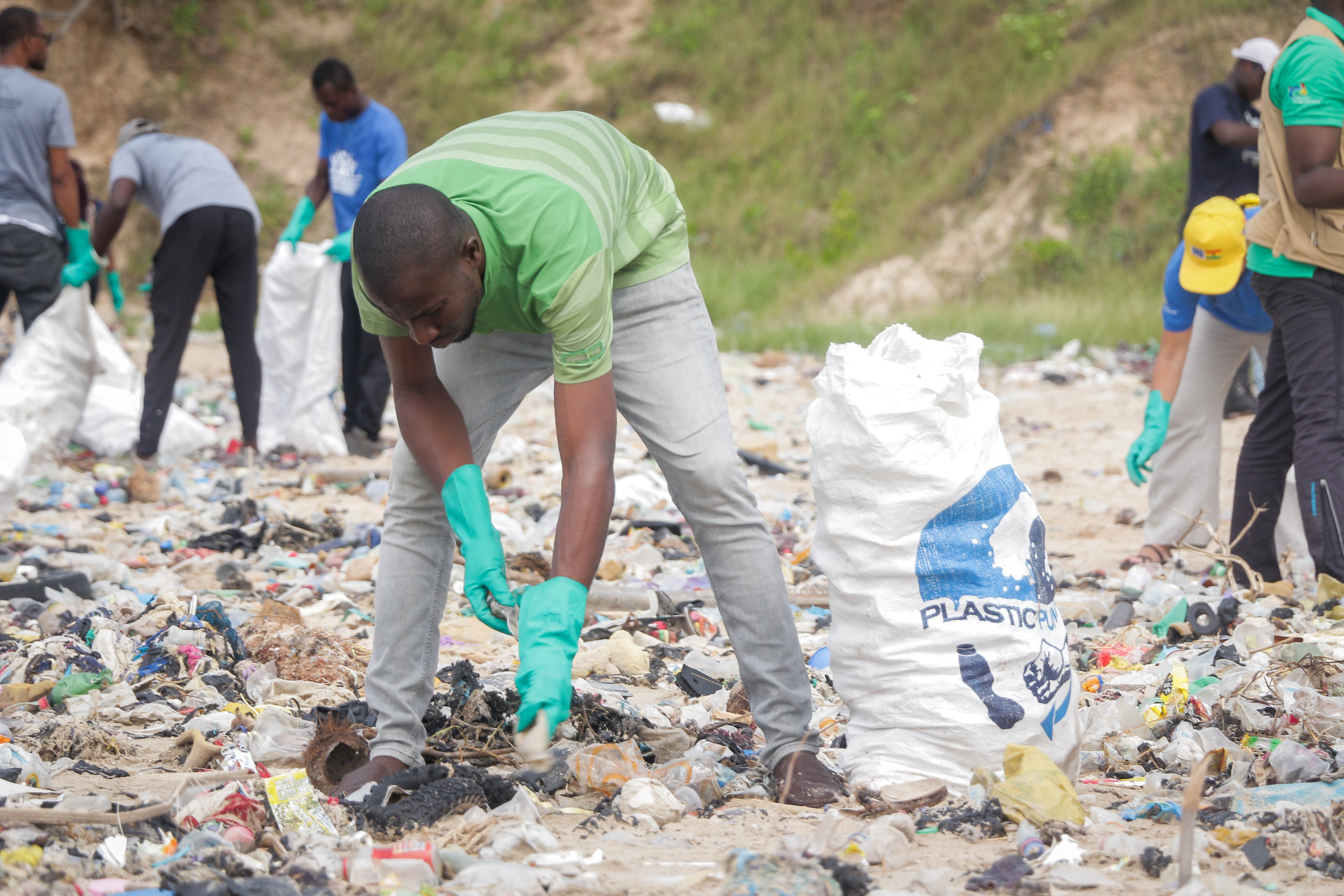
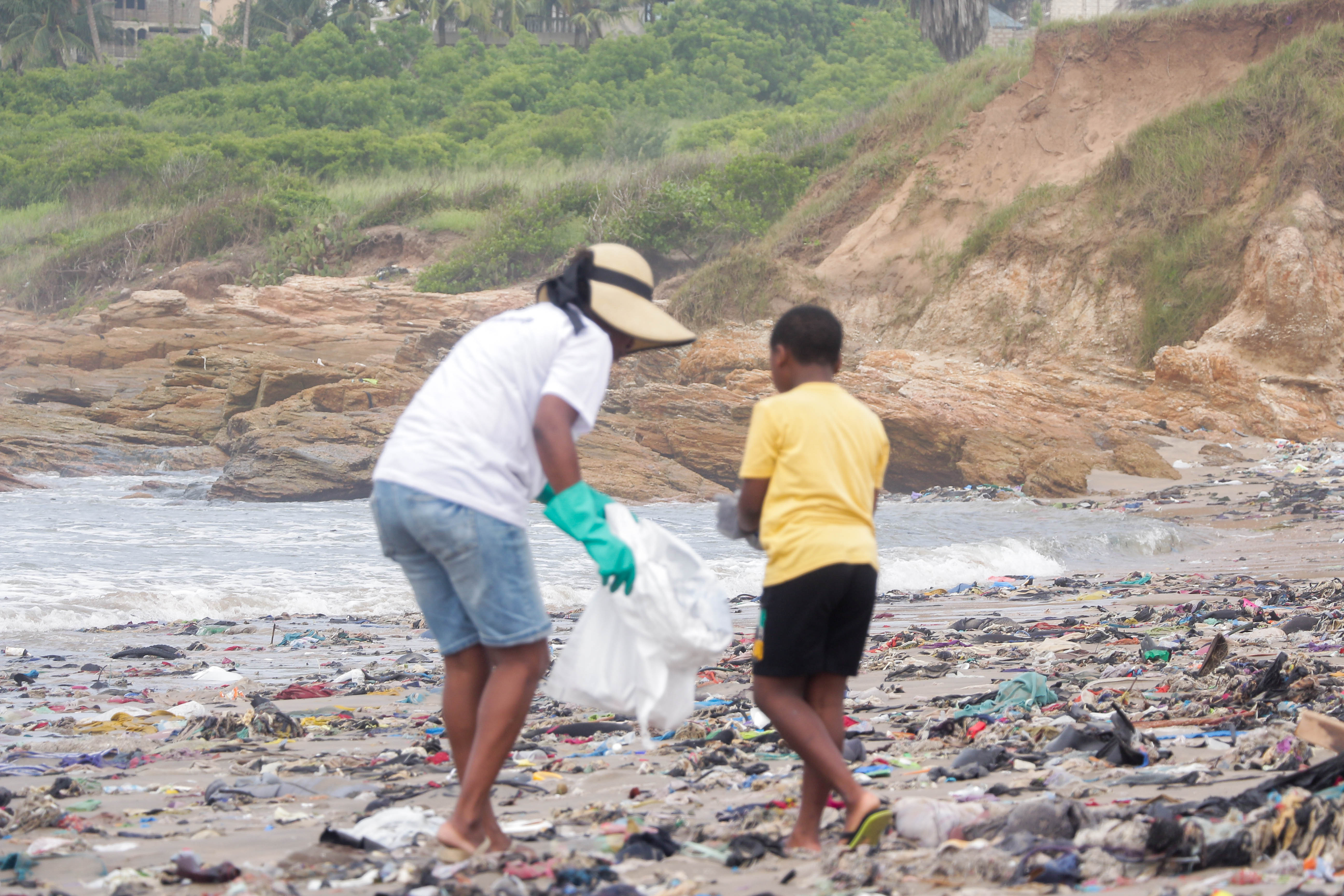
A woman and a boy collecting plastic waste at a beach during a cleanup exercise in Ghana.

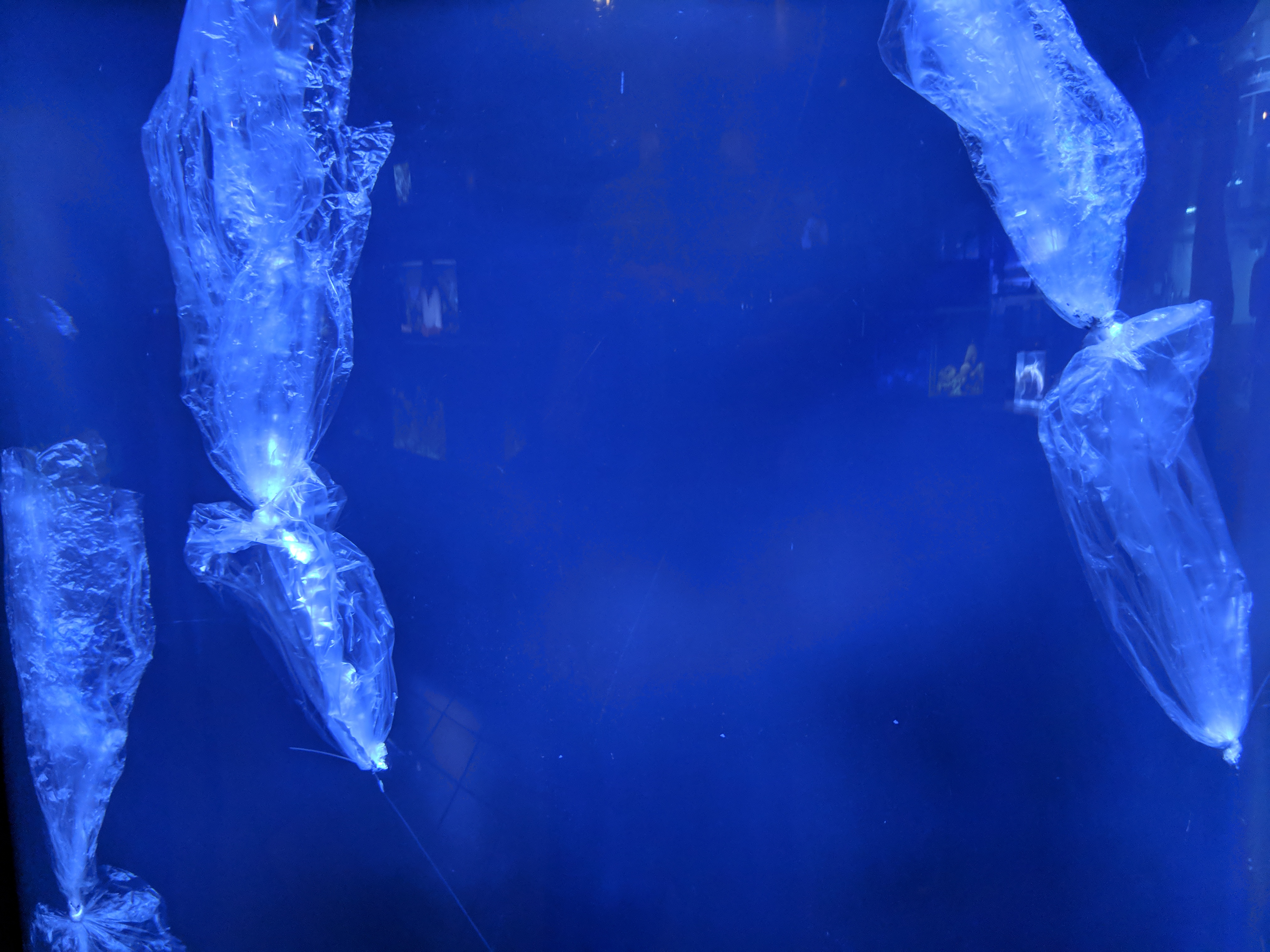
An exhibit at the Mote Marine Laboratory that displays plastic bags in the ocean that look similar to jellyfish

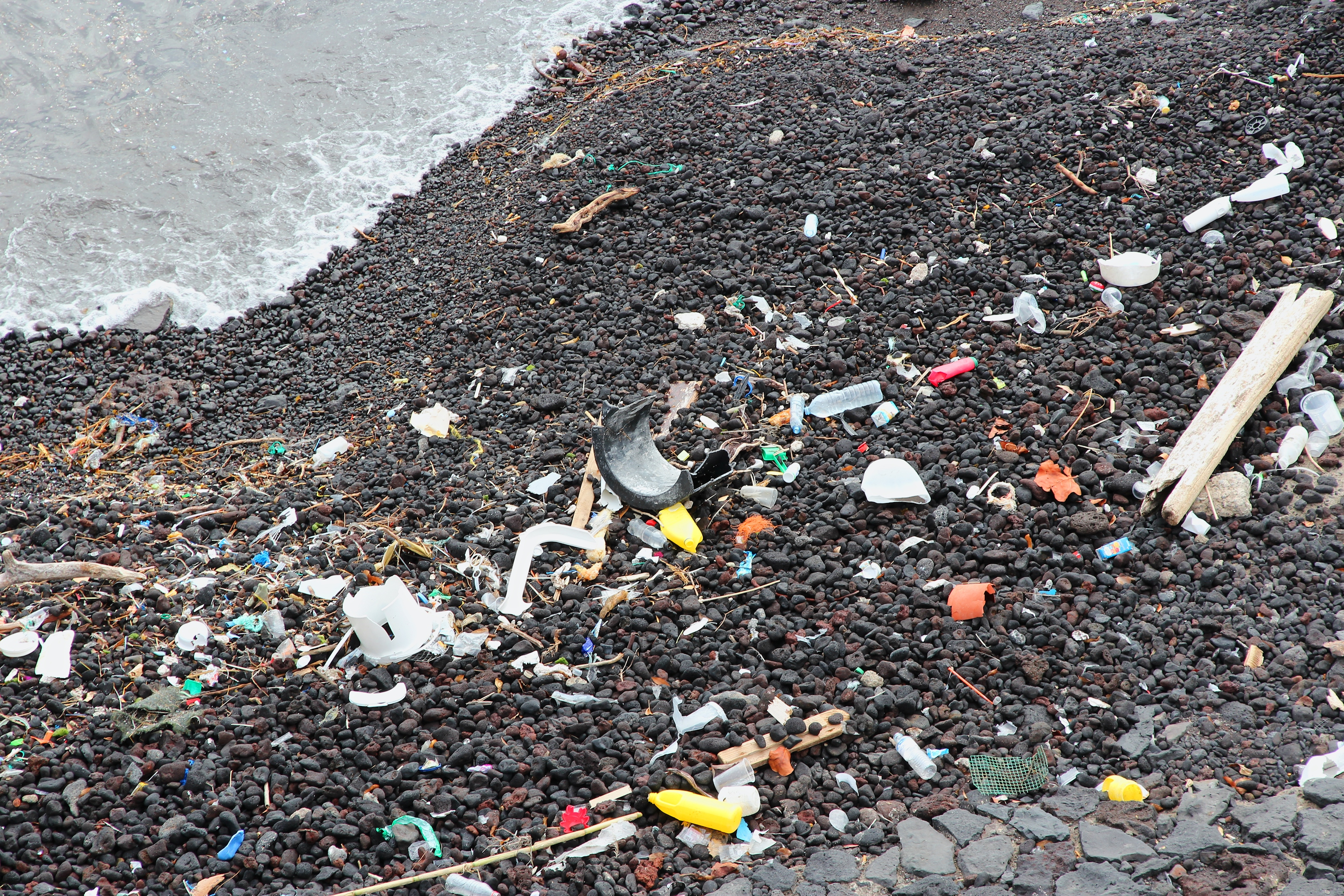
Atlantic Ocean marine plastic on a beach in Tenerife

Marine pollution caused by plastic substances is recognized as an issue of the highest magnitude, from a pollution perspective. A majority of plastics used in people's day to day lives are never recycled. Single use plastics of this kind contribute significantly to the 8 million tons of plastic waste found in the ocean each year. If this trend continues, by the year 2050 there will be more plastic than fish in the ocean by weight. In just the first decade of the century, more plastic has been created than all the plastic in history up until the year of 2000 and a majority of that plastic is not recycled. One estimate of the historic production of plastic gives a figure of 8,300 million metric tonnes (Mt) for global plastic production up to 2015, of which 79% have been accumulated in landfills or the natural environment. According to the IUCN, this number has grown to 14 million tons of plastic. There is an estimated 15 to 51 trillion pieces of plastic amongst all of the world's oceans stretching from the top of ocean to the seafloor. Oceans are Earth's deepest and most extensive basins with average depths of the abyssal plains being about 4 km beneath sea level. Gravity will naturally move and transfer materials from land to the ocean, with the ocean becoming the end-repository. Oceanic plastic pollution is remarkable for the sheer ubiquity of its presence, from ocean trenches, within deep sea sediment, on the ocean floor and ocean ridges to the ocean surface and coastal margins of oceans. Even remote island atolls can have beaches loaded with plastic from a faraway source. At the ocean surface, plastic debris is concentrated within circular structures of large areal extent, called ocean gyres. Ocean gyres form within all oceans, due to alternating patterns of zonal winds that drive equatorward interior transport in the subtropics, and poleward interior transport in subpolar oceans. Ocean currents concentrate plastic waste within the gyres.

Plastics have been increasingly manufactured because of their flexible, molding and durable qualities, which provides plastic with a myriad of useful applications. Plastics are remarkably resistant to natural weathering processes that break down many other materials at the Earth's surface. Ocean processes, including storms, wave action, ocean currents, hydration, and surface exposure to the atmospheric weathering processes (e.g. oxidation) and ultraviolet radiation, tend to break plastic particles into ever-decreasing sizes (resulting in microplastics), rather than organically digest or chemically alter plastic substances. Estimates of the total number and weight of plastic across five ocean gyre plastic concentration zones are of the order of 5.25 trillion particles weighing almost 300,000 tons. The reduction in size of plastic particles to the millimeter and micro-scales allow plastic to settle within deep sea sediments, with perhaps four times as much plastic ending up within sediments compared to surface ocean waters. Plastics are now a part of complex biogeochemical cycles with living organisms, such as cetaceans, seabirds, mammals, and bacteria, ingesting plastic.

Over 300 million tons of plastic are produced every year, half of which is used in single-use products like cups, bags, and packaging. It is estimated that 19–23 million tonnes of plastic leaks into aquatic ecosystems annually. It is impossible to know for sure, but it is estimated that about 150 million metric tons of plastic exists in our oceans. Plastic pollution makes up 80% of all marine debris from surface waters to deep-sea sediments. Because plastics are light, much of this pollution is seen in and around the ocean surface, but plastic trash and particles are now found in most marine and terrestrial habitats, including the deep sea, Great Lakes, coral reefs, beaches, rivers, and estuaries. Submarine canyons are important accumulation sites as well, contributing to the transfer of such debris to the deep sea. The most eye-catching evidence of the ocean plastic problem are the garbage patches that accumulate in gyre regions. A gyre is a circular ocean current formed by the Earth's wind patterns and the forces created by the rotation of the planet. There are five main ocean gyres: the North and South Pacific Subtropical Gyres, the North and South Atlantic Subtropical Gyres, and the Indian Ocean Subtropical Gyre. There are significant garbage patches in each of these.

Larger plastic waste (macroplastics) can be ingested by marine species, filling their stomachs and leading them to believe they are full when in fact they have taken in nothing of nutritional value. This can bring seabirds, whales, fish, and turtles to die of starvation with plastic-filled stomachs. Marine species can also be suffocated or entangled in plastic garbage.

Macroplastic waste can break can weather into smaller fragments of plastic debris, known as microplastics when they are smaller than 5mm in size. Sunlight exposure, temperature, humidity, waves, and wind begin to break the plastic down into pieces smaller than five millimeters long. Plastics can also be broken down by smaller organisms who will eat plastic debris, breaking it down into small pieces, and either excrete these microplastics or spit them out. In lab tests, it was found that amphipods of the species Orchestia gammarellus could quickly devour pieces of plastic bags, shredding a single bag into 1.75 million microscopic fragments. Although the plastic is broken down, it is still a man-made material that does not biodegrade. It is estimated that approximately 90% of the plastics in the pelagic marine environment are microplastics. There are also primary sources of microplastics, such as microbeads and nurdles. These microplastics are frequently consumed by marine organisms at the base of the food chain, like plankton and fish larvae, which leads to a concentration of ingested plastic up the food chain. Plastics are produced with toxic chemicals, so these toxic substances enter the marine food chain, including the fish that some humans eat.

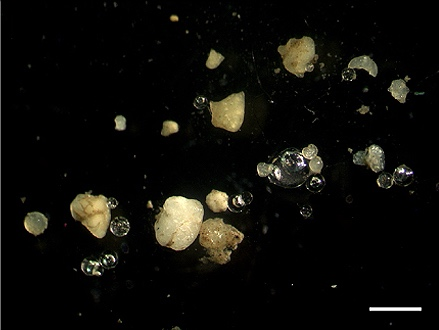
Microplastics among sand and glass spheres in sediment from the Rhine. The white bar represents 1 mm.

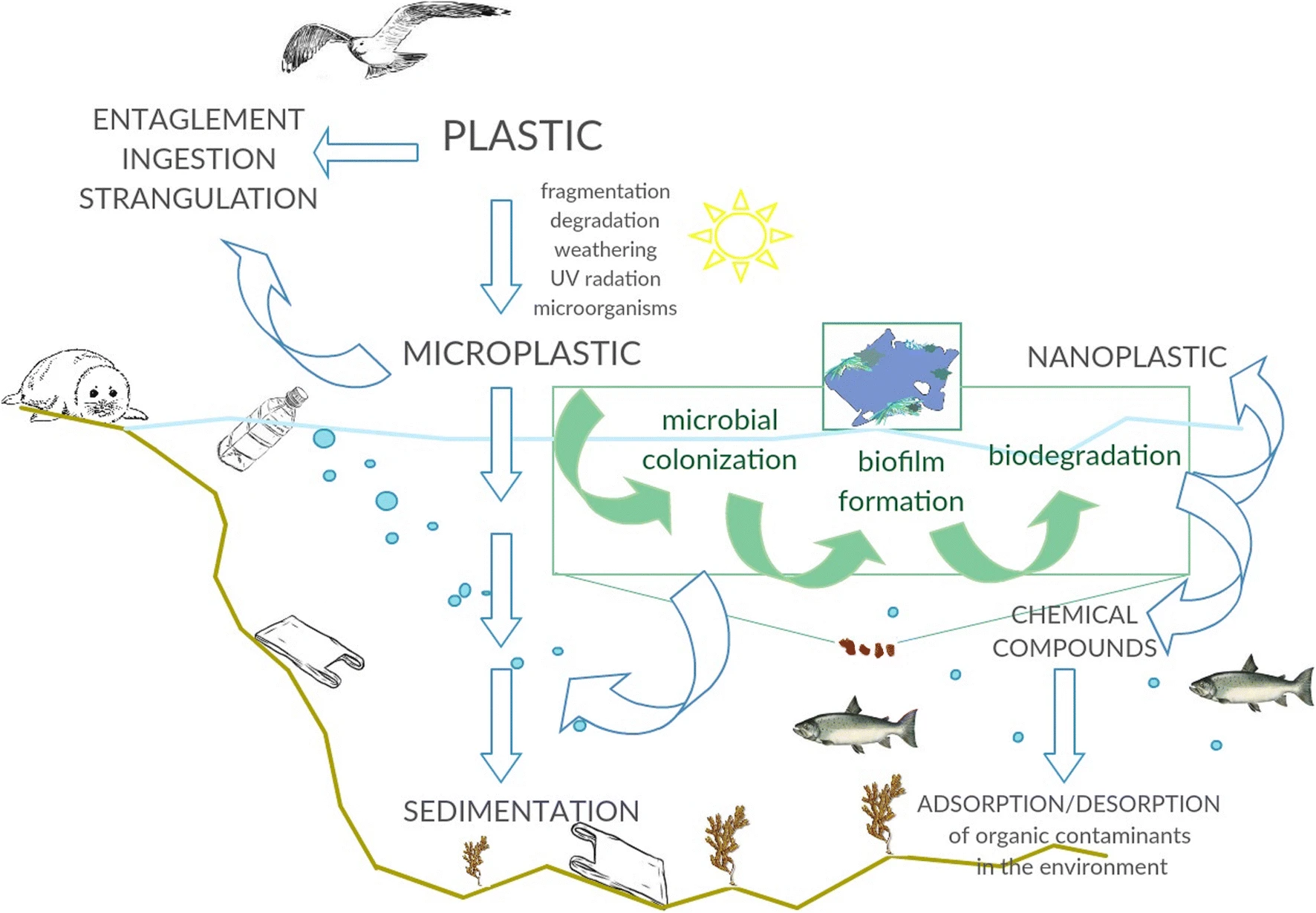
Interactions between marine microorganisms and microplastics

== Types of sources and amounts ==
Average estimated decomposition times of typical marine debris. Plastic items are shown in blue.

Plastic waste entering the seas is increasing each year with much of the plastic entering the seas is in particles smaller than 5 millimetres. As of 2016 it was estimated that there was approximately 150 million tonnes of plastic pollution in the world's oceans, estimated to grow to 250 million tonnes in 2025. Another study estimated that in 2012, it was approximately 165 million tonnes. In 2020 a study found that the Atlantic Ocean contains approximately ten times more plastic than was previously thought. The largest single type of plastic pollution (~10%) and majority of large plastic in the oceans is discarded and lost nets from the fishing industry.

The Ocean Conservancy reported that China, Indonesia, Philippines, Thailand, and Vietnam dump more plastic in the sea than all other countries combined.

One study estimated that there are more than 5 trillion plastic pieces (defined into the four classes of small microplastics, large microplastics, meso- and macroplastics) afloat at sea. In 2020, new measurements found more than 10 times as much plastic in the Atlantic Ocean than previously estimated to be there.

In October 2019, when research indicated a substantial proportion of ocean plastic pollution comes from Chinese cargo ships, an Ocean Cleanup spokesperson said: "Everyone talks about saving the oceans by stopping using plastic bags, straws and single use packaging. That's important, but when we head out on the ocean, that's not necessarily what we find."

Almost 20% of plastic debris that pollutes ocean water, which translates to 5.6 million tonnes, comes from ocean-based sources. MARPOL, an international treaty, "imposes a complete ban on the at-sea disposal of plastics". Merchant ships expel cargo, sewage, used medical equipment, and other types of waste that contain plastic into the ocean. In the United States, the Marine Plastic Pollution Research and Control Act of 1987 prohibits discharge of plastics in the sea, including from naval vessels. Naval and research vessels eject waste and military equipment that are deemed unnecessary. Pleasure craft release fishing gear and other types of waste, either accidentally or through negligent handling. The largest ocean-based source of plastic pollution is discarded fishing gear (including traps and nets), estimated to be up to 90% of plastic debris in some areas.

Continental plastic litter enters the ocean largely through storm-water runoff, flowing into watercourses or directly discharged into coastal waters. Plastic in the ocean has been shown to follow ocean currents which eventually form into what is known as Great Garbage Patches.

The impact of microplastic and macroplastic into the ocean is not subjected to infiltration directly by dumping of plastic into marine ecosystems, but through polluted rivers that lead or create passageways to oceans across the globe. Rivers can either act as a source or sink depending on the context. Rivers are thought to be a major source of plastic pollution for the ocean, although possibly not as much as direct input from coastal populations.

The amount of plastic that is recorded to be in the ocean is considerably less than the amount of plastic that is entering the ocean at any given time. According to a study done in the UK, there are "ten top" macroplastic dominant typologies that are solely consumer related (located in the table below). Within this study, 192,213 litter items were counted with an average of 71% being plastic and 59% were consumer related macroplastic items. Even though freshwater pollution is the major contributor to marine plastic pollution there is little studies done and data collection for the amount of pollution going from freshwater to marine. Majority of papers conclude that there is minimal data collection of plastic debris in freshwater environments and natural terrestrial environments, even though these are the major contributor. The need for policy change in production, usage, disposal, and waste management is necessary to decrease the amount and potential of plastic to enter freshwater environments.

A 1994 study of the seabed using trawl nets in the north-western Mediterranean around the coasts of Spain, France, and Italy reported mean concentrations of debris of 1,935 items per square kilometre. Plastic debris accounted for 77%, of which 93% was plastic bags.

A 2026 systematic review highlighted the need for standardized methods to monitor plastic pollution, as differences in sampling and analysis methods can make results difficult to compare across studies.

=== Buoyancy ===
Approximately half of the plastic material introduced to the marine environment is buoyant, but fouling by organisms can cause plastic debris to sink to the sea floor, where it may interfere with sediment-dwelling species and sedimental gas exchange processes. Several factors contribute to microplastic's buoyancy, including the density of the plastic it is composed of as well as the size and shape of the microplastic fragments themselves. Microplastics can also form a buoyant biofilm layer on the ocean's surface. Buoyancy changes in relation to ingestion of microplastics have been clearly observed in autotrophs because the absorption can interfere with photosynthesis and subsequent gas levels. However, this issue is of more importance for larger plastic debris.

Plastic densities
Plastic Type	Abbreviation	Density (g/cm^{3})
Polystyrene	PS	1.04–1.08
Expanded Polystyrene	EPS	0.01–0.04
Low-density Polyethylene	LDPE	0.89–0.93
High-density Polyethylene	HDPE	0.94–0.98
Polyamide	PA	1.13–1.16
Polypropylene	PP	0.85–0.92
Acrylonitrile-butadiene-styrene	ABS	1.04–1.06
Polytetrafluoroethylene	PTFE	2.10–2.30
Cellulose Acetate	CA	1.30
Polycarbonate	PC	1.20–1.22
Polymethyl methacrylate	PMMA	1.16–1.20
Polyvinyl chloride	PVC	1.38–1.41
Polyethylene terephthalate	PET	1.38–1.41

=== Land-based sources ===
Mismanaged plastic waste per capita

Estimates for the contribution of land-based plastic vary widely. While one study estimated that a little over 80% of plastic debris in ocean water comes from land-based sources, responsible for 800,000 tonnes (880,000 short tons) every year. In 2015, it was calculated that 275 million tonnes (303 million short tons) of plastic waste was generated in 192 coastal countries in 2010, with 4.8 to 12.7 million tonnes (5.3 to 14 million short tons) entering the ocean – a percentage of only up to 5%.

Most land-based plastic pollution enters the ocean from South, Southeast, and East Asia, with the largest emitters including China, Indonesia, Philippines, and India.

A source that has caused concern is landfills. Most waste in the form of plastic in landfills are single-use items such as packaging. Discarding plastics this way leads to accumulation. Although disposing of plastic waste in landfills has less of a gas emission risk than disposal through incineration, the former has space limitations. Another concern is that the liners acting as protective layers between the landfill and environment can break, thus leaking toxins and contaminating the nearby soil and water. Landfills located near oceans often contribute to ocean debris because content is easily swept up and transported to the sea by wind or small waterways like rivers and streams. Marine debris can also result from sewage water that has not been efficiently treated, which is eventually transported to the ocean through rivers. Plastic items that have been improperly discarded can also be carried to oceans through storm waters.

Plastic waste emitted to the ocean per capita

Plastic waste emitted to the ocean

Probability of mismanaged plastic waste being emitted to ocean

== Microplastics ==
Microplastics in the surface ocean 1950–2000 and projections beyond, in million metric tonnes

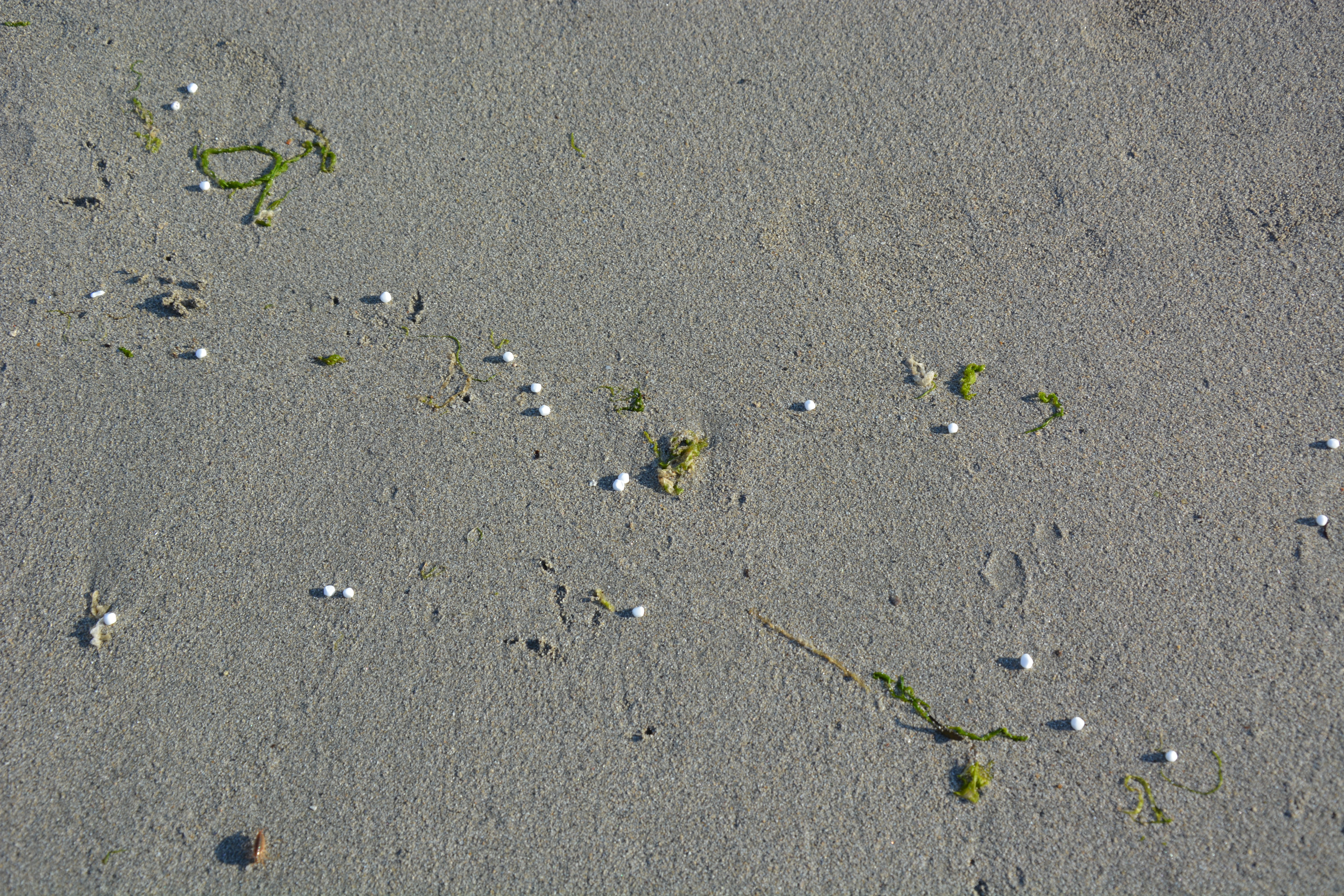
Polystyrene foam beads on an Irish beach

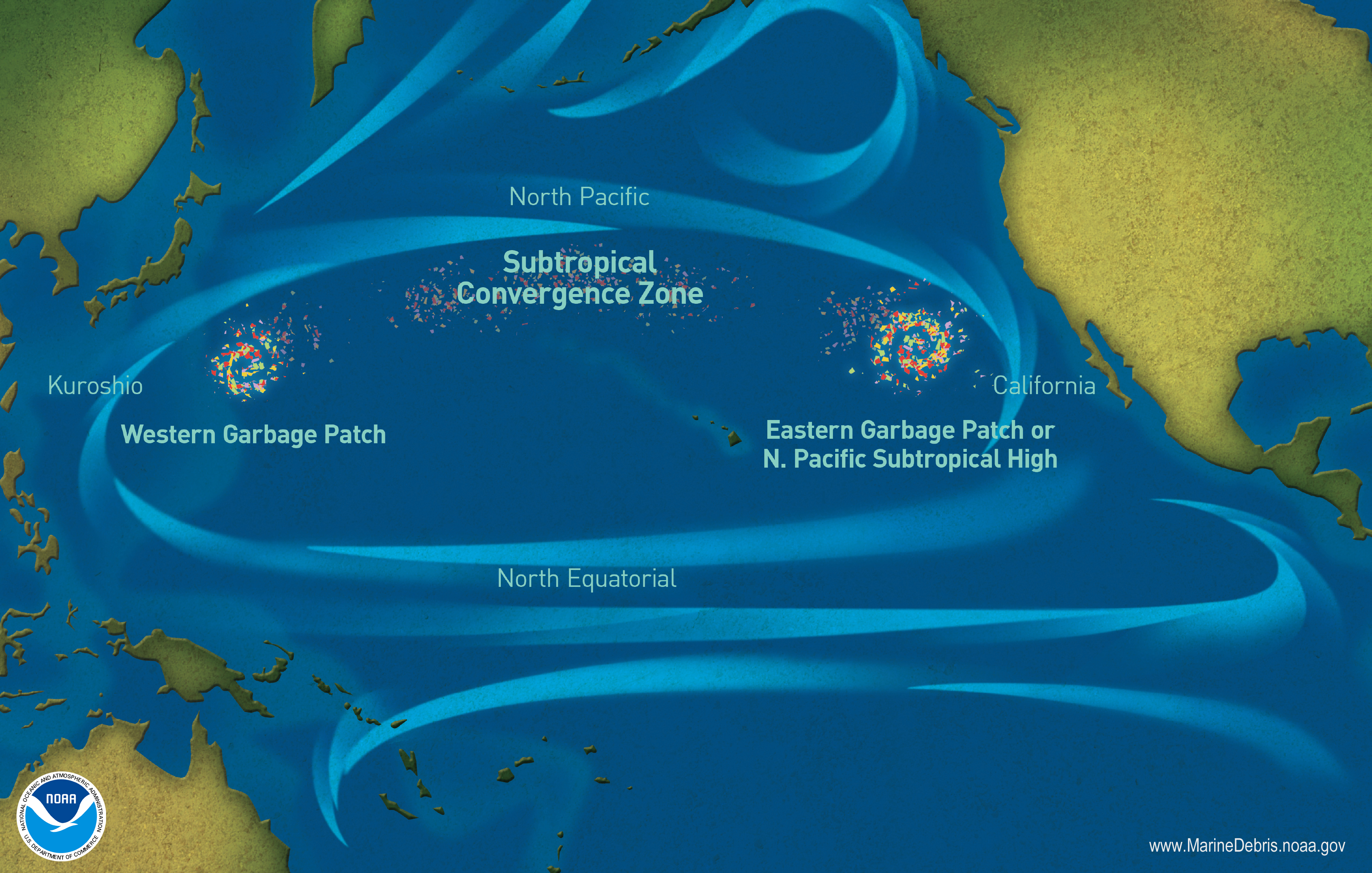
Great Pacific Garbage Patch – Pacific Ocean currents have created three "islands" of debris.

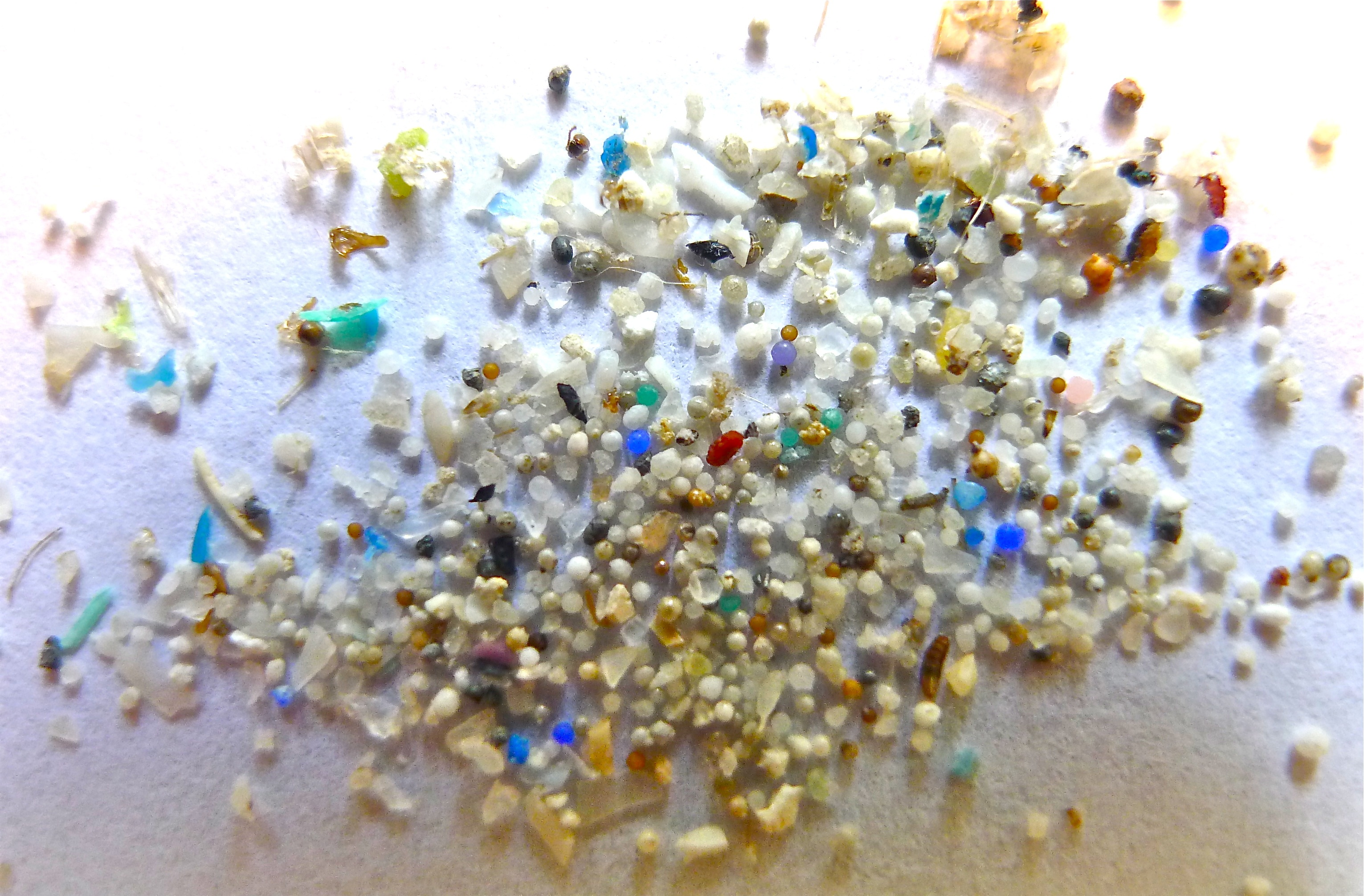
Sample of microplastic collected by Oregon State University

A growing concern regarding plastic pollution in the marine ecosystem is the use of microplastics. Microplastics are beads of plastic less than 5 millimeters wide, and they are commonly found in hand soaps, face cleansers, and other exfoliators. When these products are used, the microplastics go through the water filtration system and into the ocean, but because of their small size they are likely to escape capture by the preliminary treatment screens on wastewater plants. These beads are harmful to the organisms in the ocean, especially filter feeders, because they can easily ingest the plastic and become sick. The microplastics are such a concern because it is difficult to clean them up due to their size, so humans can try to avoid using these harmful plastics by purchasing products that use environmentally safe exfoliates.

=== The extent of marine microplastics ===
Because plastic is so widely used across the planet, microplastics have become widespread in the marine environment. For example, microplastics can be found on sandy beaches and surface waters as well as in the water column and deep sea sediment. Microplastics are also found within the many other types of marine particles such as dead biological material (tissue and shells) and some soil particles (blown in by wind and carried to the ocean by rivers). Population density and proximity to urban centers have been considered the main factors that influence the abundance of microplastics in the environment.

=== Sources of microplastics to the ocean ===
A greater concentration of microplastics have been associated with rainfall events. The runoff after rainfall on land, where plastic production and degradation rate of plastic debris is higher, could deliver these microplastics into the aquatic environment. The greater the rainfall, the stronger the erosion effect of surface runoff on land will be, and the more plastic debris will be transported.

Microplastics enter waterways through many avenues including deterioration of road paint, tire wear and city dust entering the waterways, plastic pellets spilled from shipping containers, ghost nets and other synthetic textiles dumped into the ocean, cosmetics discharged and laundry products entering sewage water and marine coatings on ships degrading.

Coatings used on ships are significant sources of plastic pollution - nearly 80% of plastic fragments collected in the German Bight were determined to have originated from marine coatings rather than land-based sources, based on their polymeric content. Plastic pollution leached from coatings are usually based on polyvinyl chloride or poly(methyl methacrylate) polymers, whereas terrestrial plastics are usually made from polypropylene, polyethylene, and polyethylene terephthalate. Coating surfaces degrade over time due to weathering and the action of waves on the coating surface. Compared with land-based plastics, pollution from marine coatings contains much higher quantities of chemical additives, such as adhesion promoters, biocides, crosslinkers, pigments, plasticizers, and UV absorbers. As such, marine coatings act as a source of toxic chemical substances into the ocean, in addition to microplastics. Biocides are toxic chemical additives, typically heavy metals (though there is a push towards fouling-release technologies), which are added to prevent fouling attaching to the hull. However, as the plastic polymer networks degrade, biocide previously within the polymeric "mesh" leaches into the ocean. The leaching of tributyltin (TBT) biocides from marine coatings was first identified in 1980 as the cause of imposex observed in dog whelks in coastal regions. TBT compounds are endocrine disruptors, which have the ability to mimic sex hormones, which can result in imposex, rendering the non-target organism infertile. Manufacturers are trending towards fouling-release coating technologies, though these coatings have even higher quantities of chemical additives to address their inherent mechanical weakness. These coatings undergo degradation easily, and can act as a vehicle for the release of microplastics into the ocean. To date, the International Convention for the Prevention of Pollution from Ships (MARPOL) does not outline any regulations addressing the leaching of chemical-laced plastics from marine coatings, though the International Maritime Organization (IMO) has set out international restrictions for a very limited number of biocidal compounds, such as TBT compounds in 2008, and Cybutryne (Irgarol 1051) in 2023.

=== Transport mechanisms ===
Upon reaching marine environments, due to their small size and low density, microplastics are transported over long distances via wind and surface ocean currents. The transportation is affected by their inherent characteristics (texture and shape) but also environmental factors such as flow velocity, matrix type and seasonal variability. Numerical models are able to trace small plastic debris (micro- and meso-plastics) drifting in the ocean, thus predicting their fate.

Some microplastics leave the sea and enter the air, as researchers from the University of Strathclyde discovered in 2020. Some remain on the ocean's surface; microplastics account for 92% of plastic debris on the ocean's surface, according to a 2018 study. And some sink to the ocean floor. Australia's national science agency CSIRO estimated that 14 million metric tons of microplastics are already on the ocean floor in 2020. This represents an increase from a 2015 estimate that the world's oceans contain 93–236 thousand metric tons of microplastics and a 2018 estimate of 270 thousand tons.

Three primary transport pathways of microplastics to the deep sea are currently being considered: the physical incorporation into marine snow aggregates, the biological uptake and transfer through food webs, and the biofouling of microplastics. Marine snow aggregates, which are primarily composed of organic detritus, microorganisms, and clay minerals, play a major role in transporting organic matter from the surface ocean to the deep sea. As these aggregates sink, they can incorporate microplastics and facilitate their transport from surface waters to depths. Ingested microplastics may be transported vertically in the water column through sinking fecal pellets or through successive trophic levels as they are consumed by different organisms. Lastly, the accumulation of microorganisms on plastic particles (biofouling) can increase the density of the plastic, causing the particles to sink. However, a study from 2024 argues that most small microplastics will not sink because of biofouling, due to the unlikeliness that the density of biofouled microplastic particles would be high enough to cause sinking and the subsequent settling to the deep ocean floor.

A study of the distribution of eastern Pacific Ocean surface plastic debris (not specifically microplastic, although, as previously mentioned, most is likely microplastic) helps to illustrate the rising concentration of plastics in the ocean. By using data on surface plastic concentration (pieces of plastic per km^{2}) from 1972 to 1985 (n=60) and 2002–2012 (n=457) within the same plastic accumulation zone, the study found the mean plastic concentration increase between the two sets of data, including a 10-fold increase of 18,160 to 189,800 pieces of plastic per km^{2}.

Arctic Ocean microplastics come mainly from Atlantic sources, especially Europe and North America. Recent studies have revealed that the concentration of microplastics on glaciers or snow is surprisingly higher than even urban water bodies, even though microplastics are not directly used or produced near glaciers. As of 2021, Europe and Central Asia account for around 16% of global microplastics discharge into the seas.

A higher concentration of microplastics in glaciers indicates that transport via wind is a significant pathway to distribute microplastics in the environment.

=== Environmental and Health Impacts of Microplastics ===
Microplastics can accumulate in the whitecaps of ocean waves or sea foam and increase the stability of breaking waves, potentially affecting sea albedo or atmosphere-ocean gas exchange. A study found that microplastics from oceans have been found in sea breeze and may re-enter the atmosphere.

Microplastics can concentrate in the gills and intestines of marine life and can interfere with their feedings habits, typically resulting in death. Microplastics have been shown to induce a lethargic swimming and feeding behavior in fish, mussels and nematodes, under severe overload situations. Microplastic size is an important feature for the production of toxic effects on the different organisms, however, the tissue structure and anatomy of each organism play an important role in the severity of the damage that these particles can produce.

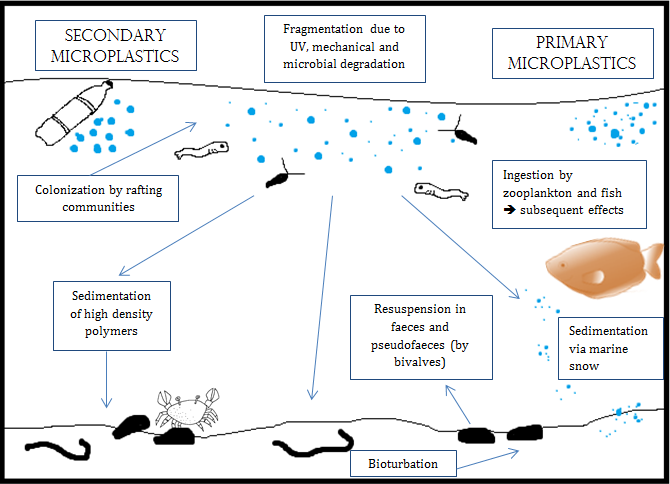
Microplastics impact on marine food web

Bioaccumulation of microplastics can have a huge effect on the food web, thus altering ecosystems and contributing to loss of biodiversity. Once ingested, microplastics will either be egested or retained by an organism. If a predator consumes an organism that has retained microplastic, the predator will be indirectly consuming this plastic as part of its diet, in a process referred to as "trophic transfer'. Retention of plastics can be influenced by food availability and shape but will be governed by the size of the plastic. Ingested microplastics will typically be passed along the intestinal tract, then will either be adsorbed across the gut lining, become entrapped in the gut (i.e., intestinal blockage causing retention of plastic), or become incorporated into the animal's feces and egested.

The ingestion of plastic by marine organisms has now been established at full ocean depth. Microplastic was found in the stomachs of hadal amphipods sampled from the Japan, Izu-Bonin, Mariana, Kermadec, New Hebrides and the Peru-Chile trenches. The amphipods from the Mariana Trench were sampled at 10,890 m and all contained microfibres.

According to one recent research estimate, a person who consumes seafood will ingest 11 000 bits of microplastics per year. Even very minute microplastics have been discovered in human blood.

Two billion people worldwide lack adequate garbage collection facilities to capture harmful plastics. Improved wastewater treatment and stormwater management in many poor nations would prevent part of the 1.5 million tonnes of microplastics from entering the marine ecosystems each year.

=== Research studies ===
The extent of microplastic pollution in the deep sea has yet to be fully determined, and as a result scientists are currently examining organisms and studying sediments to better understand this issue. A 2013 study surveyed four separate locations to represent a wider range of marine habitats at depths varying from 1100–5000m. Three of the four locations had identifiable amounts of microplastics present in the top 1 cm layer of sediment. Core samples were taken from each spot and had their microplastics filtered out of the normal sediment. The plastic components were identified using micro-Raman spectroscopy; the results showed man-made pigments commonly used in the plastic industry. In 2016, researchers used an ROV to collect nine deep-sea organisms and core-top sediments. The nine deep-sea organisms were dissected and various organs were examined by the researchers on shore to identify microplastics with a microscope. The scientists found that six out of the nine organisms examined contain microplastics which were all microfibers, specifically located in the GI tract. Research performed by MBARI in 2013 off the west coast of North America and around Hawaii found that out of all the debris observed from 22 years of VARS database video footage, one-third of the items was plastic bags. This debris was most common below 2000 m depth. A recent study that collected organisms and sediments in the Abyssopelagic Zone of the Western Pacific Ocean extracted materials from samples and discovered that poly(propylene-ethylene) copolymer (40.0%) and polyethylene terephthalate (27.5%) were the most commonly detected polymers. A long-term study has found that there has been consistent microplastic ingestion by deep-sea invertebrates over four decades (1976-2015). The mass production of plastics began in the 1940s-50s, so this study suggests a relatively rapid transport of microplastics to the deep ocean floor.

Another study was conducted by collecting deep-sea sediment and coral specimens between 2011 and 2012 in the Mediterranean Sea, Southwest Indian Ocean, and Northeast Atlantic Ocean. Of the 12 coral and sediment samples taken, all were found with an abundance of microplastics. Rayon is not a plastic but was included in the study due to being a common synthetic material. It was found in all samples and comprised 56.9% of materials found, followed by polyester (53.4%), plastics (34.1%) and acrylic (12.4%). This study found that the amount of microplastics, in the form of microfibres, was comparable to that found in intertidal or subtidal sediments. A 2017 study had a similar finding – by surveying the Rockall Trough in the Northeast Atlantic Ocean at a depth of more than 2200 meters, microplastic fibers were identified at a concentration of 70.8 particles per cubic meter. This is comparable to amounts reported in surface waters. This study also looked at micropollution ingested by benthic invertebrates Ophiomusium lymani, Hymenaster pellucidus and Colus jeffreysianus and found that of the 66 organisms studied, 48% had ingested microplastics in quantities also comparable to coastal species. A recent review of 112 studies found the highest plastic ingestion in organisms collected in the Mediterranean and Northeast Indian Ocean with significant differences among plastic types ingested by different groups of animals, including differences in colour and the type of prevalent polymers. Overall, clear fibre microplastics are likely the most predominant types ingested by marine megafauna around the globe.

In 2020 scientists created what may be the first scientific estimate of how much microplastic currently resides in Earth's seafloor, after investigating six areas of ~3 km depth ~300 km off the Australian coast. They found the highly variable microplastic counts to be proportionate to plastic on the surface and the angle of the seafloor slope. By averaging the microplastic mass per cm^{3}, they estimated that Earth's seafloor contains about 14 million tons of microplastic – about double the amount they estimated based on data from earlier studies – despite calling both estimates "conservative" as coastal areas are known to contain much more microplastic. These estimates are about one to two times the amount of plastic thought to currently enter the oceans annually.

== Toxic chemicals ==
Toxic additives used in the manufacture of plastic materials can leach out into their surroundings when exposed to water. Approximately 8000–19000 tonnes of additives are transported with buoyant plastic matrices globally with a significant portion also transported to the Arctic. Waterborne hydrophobic pollutants collect and magnify on the surface of plastic debris, thus making plastic far more deadly in the ocean than it would be on land. Hydrophobic contaminants are also known to bioaccumulate in fatty tissues, biomagnifying up the food chain and putting pressure on apex predators and humans. Some plastic additives are known to disrupt the endocrine system when consumed, others can suppress the immune system or decrease reproductive rates.

Floating debris can also absorb persistent organic pollutants from seawater, including PCBs, DDT, and PAHs. Plastic debris can absorb toxic chemicals from ocean pollution, potentially poisoning any creature that eats it. Aside from toxic effects when ingested some of these affect animal brain cells similarly to estradiol, causing hormone disruption in the affected wildlife. A study discovered, when plastics eventually decompose, they produce potentially toxic bisphenol A (BPA) and PS oligomer into the water. These toxins are believed to bring harm to the marine life living in the area. Bisphenol A (BPA) is a famous example of a plasticizer produced in high volumes for food packing from where it can leach into food, leading to human exposure. As an estrogen and glucocorticoid receptor agonist, BPA is interfering with the endocrine system and is associated with increased fat in rodents.

Researchers collected seawater samples worldwide, and found that all samples contained polystyrene derivatives. Polystyrene is a plastic found in styrofoam and many household and consumer goods. The scientists then simulated the decomposition of polystyrene in the open ocean. The results of this simulation showed that polystyrene, which begins breaking down at temperatures of 86° and higher, breaks down into harmful chemicals, such as Bisphenol A (BPA, which can cause reproductive harm in animals), styrene monomer (a suspected carcinogen), and styrene trimer (a by-product of polystyrene).

Plasticizers in microplastics have been linked to abnormal growth and reproductive problems in multiple animal models due to endocrine disruption. Microplastics have also been postulated to cause GI irritation, alteration of the microbiome, disturbance of energy and lipid metabolism, and oxidative stress.

Organic pollutants, such as pesticides, can leach into organisms that ingest microplastics, along with dangerous metals such as lead and cadmium.

== Accumulation sites ==
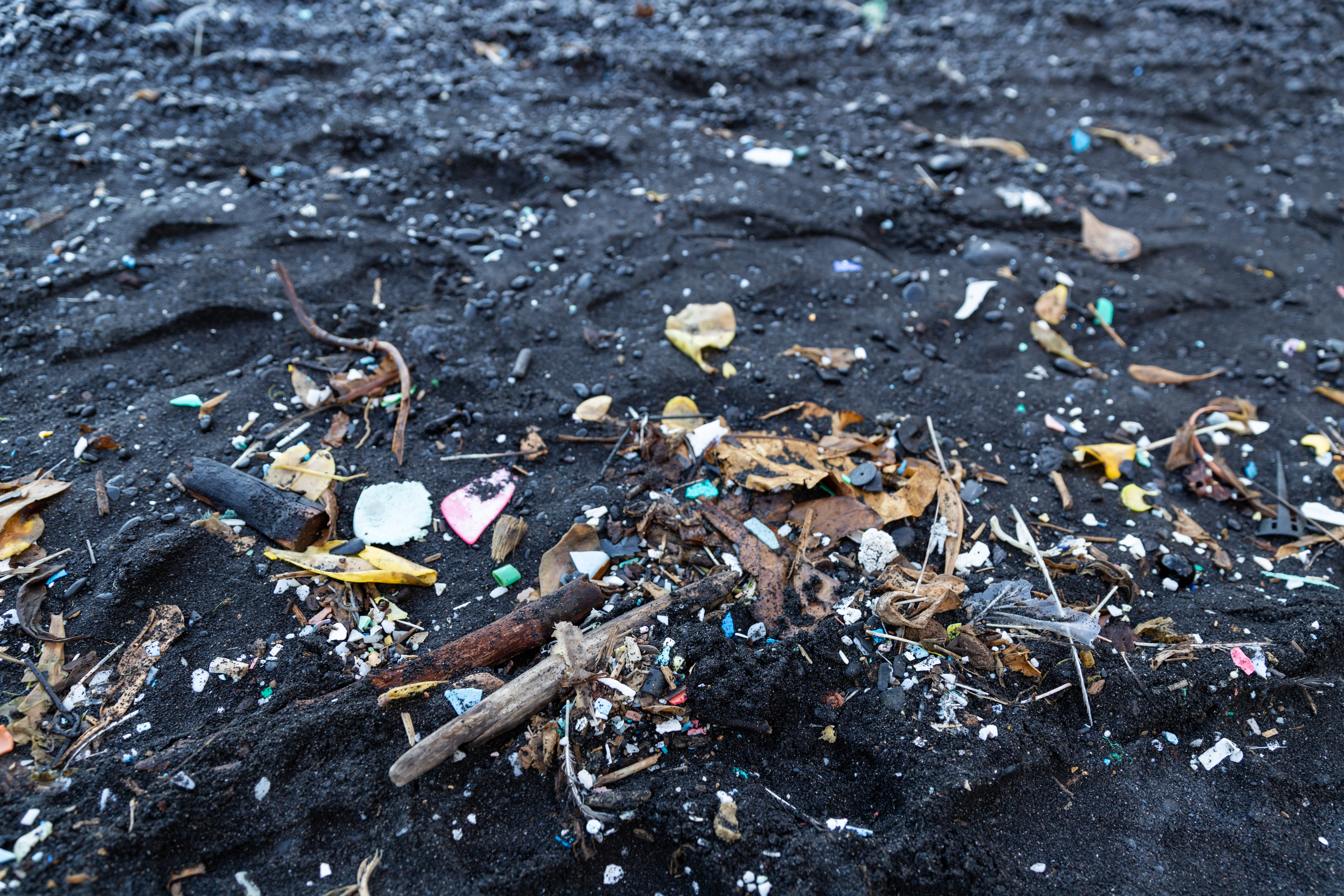
Pacific garbage on a black sand beach in Maui, Hawaii

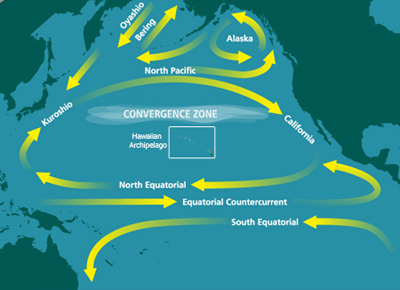
North Pacific Subtropical Convergence Zone

Plastic debris tends to accumulate at the center of ocean gyres. The North Pacific Gyre, for example, has collected the Great Pacific Garbage Patch, which is now estimated to be one to twenty times the size of Texas (approximately from 700,000 to 15,000,000 square kilometers). There could be as much plastic as fish in the sea. It has a very high level of plastic particulate suspended in the upper water column. In samples taken from the North Pacific Gyre in 1999, the mass of plastic exceeded that of zooplankton (the dominant animal life in the area) by a factor of six.

Midway Atoll, in common with all the Hawaiian Islands, receives substantial amounts of debris from the garbage patch. Ninety percent plastic, this debris accumulates on the beaches of Midway where it becomes a hazard to the bird population of the island.

=== Garbage patches ===
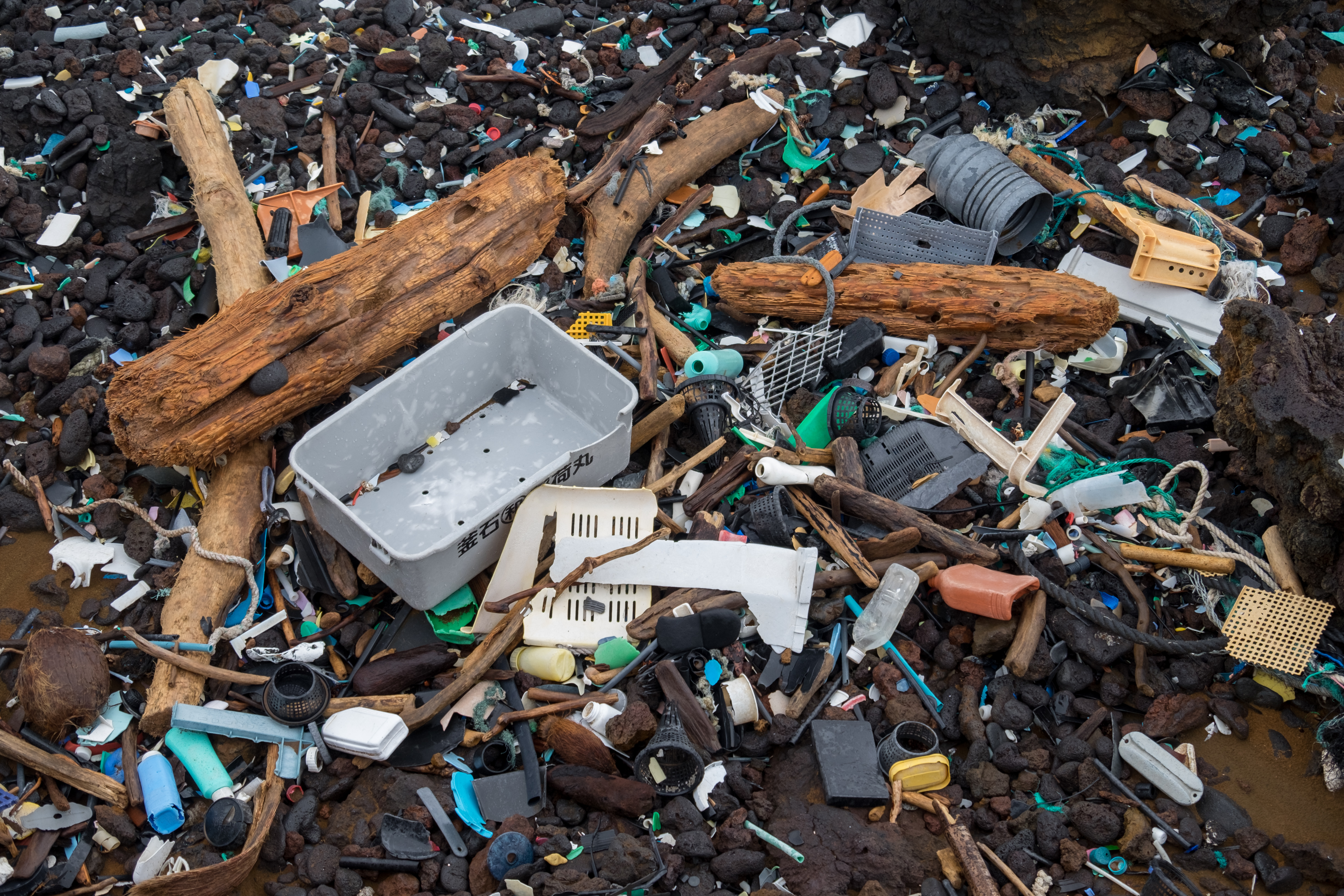
Trash washed ashore in Hawaii from the Great Pacific Garbage Patch

A garbage patch is a gyre of marine debris particles caused by the effects of ocean currents and increasing plastic pollution by human populations. These human-caused collections of plastic and other debris are responsible for ecosystem and environmental problems that affect marine life, contaminate oceans with toxic chemicals, and contribute to greenhouse gas emissions. Once waterborne, marine debris becomes mobile. Flotsam can be blown by the wind, or follow the flow of ocean currents, often ending up in the middle of oceanic gyres where currents are weakest.

== Environmental impacts ==
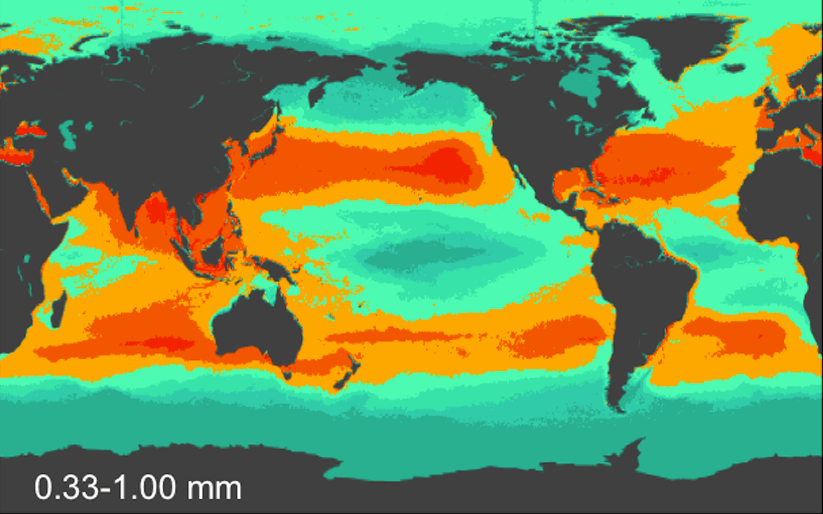
Model results for the count density of planktonic plastic particles (red is more dense, green is less dense)

The litter that is being delivered into the oceans is toxic to marine life, and humans. The toxins that are components of plastic include diethylhexyl phthalate, which is a toxic carcinogen, as well as lead, cadmium, and mercury.

Plankton, fish, and ultimately the human race, through the food chain, ingest these highly toxic carcinogens and chemicals. Consuming the fish that contain these toxins can cause an increase in cancer, immune disorders, and birth defects. However, these toxins are not only found in fish but also in staple foods, drinking water, table salts, toothpaste, and other kinds of seafood. These issues can be found in Indonesia, which is the second largest contributor of plastic waste, where human stools were collected from fishermen finding that 50% had concentrations of microplastics. Each human stool that had microplastics had a concentration between 3.33 and 13.99 μg of microplastic per gram of feces.

The majority of the litter near and in the ocean is made up of plastics and is a persistent pervasive source of marine pollution. In many countries improper management of solid waste means there is little control of plastic entering the water system. As of 2016, there are 5.25 trillion particles of plastic pollution that weigh as much as 270,000 tonnes. Since then, studies have found that the amount of plastic particles has increased to somewhere from 15 to 51 trillion particles in 2021. This plastic is taken by the ocean currents and accumulates in large vortexes known as ocean gyres. The majority of the gyres become pollution dumps filled with plastic.

Research on floating plastic debris in the ocean was the fastest-growing topic among 56 sustainability topics examined in a study of scientific publishing by 193 countries over 2011 to 2019. Over nine years, global research documenting this phenomenon ballooned from 46 (2011) to 853 (2019) publications.

=== Marine ecosystems ===
Concern among experts has grown since the 2000s that some organisms have adapted to live on floating plastic debris, allowing them to disperse with ocean currents and thus potentially become invasive species in distant ecosystems. Marine animals can experience internal injuries, lacerations, infections, starvation, and diminished swimming ability from injesting plastic or getting entangled in plastic garbage. Additionally, floating plastics aid in the spread of invasive marine organisms, endangering marine biodiversity and the food chain. Research in 2014 in the waters around Australia confirmed a wealth of such colonists, even on tiny flakes, and also found thriving ocean bacteria eating into the plastic to form pits and grooves. These researchers showed that "plastic biodegradation is occurring at the sea surface" through the action of bacteria, and noted that this is congruent with a new body of research on such bacteria. Their finding is also congruent with the other major research undertaken in 2014, which sought to answer the riddle of the overall lack of build up of floating plastic in the oceans, despite ongoing high levels of dumping. Plastics were found as microfibres in core samples drilled from sediments at the bottom of the deep ocean. The cause of such widespread deep sea deposition has yet to be determined.

The hydrophobic nature of plastic surfaces stimulates rapid formation of biofilms, which support a wide range of metabolic activities, and drive succession of other micro- and macro-organisms.

=== Photodegradation of plastics ===
Photodegraded plastic straw – a light touch breaks a straw into microplastics

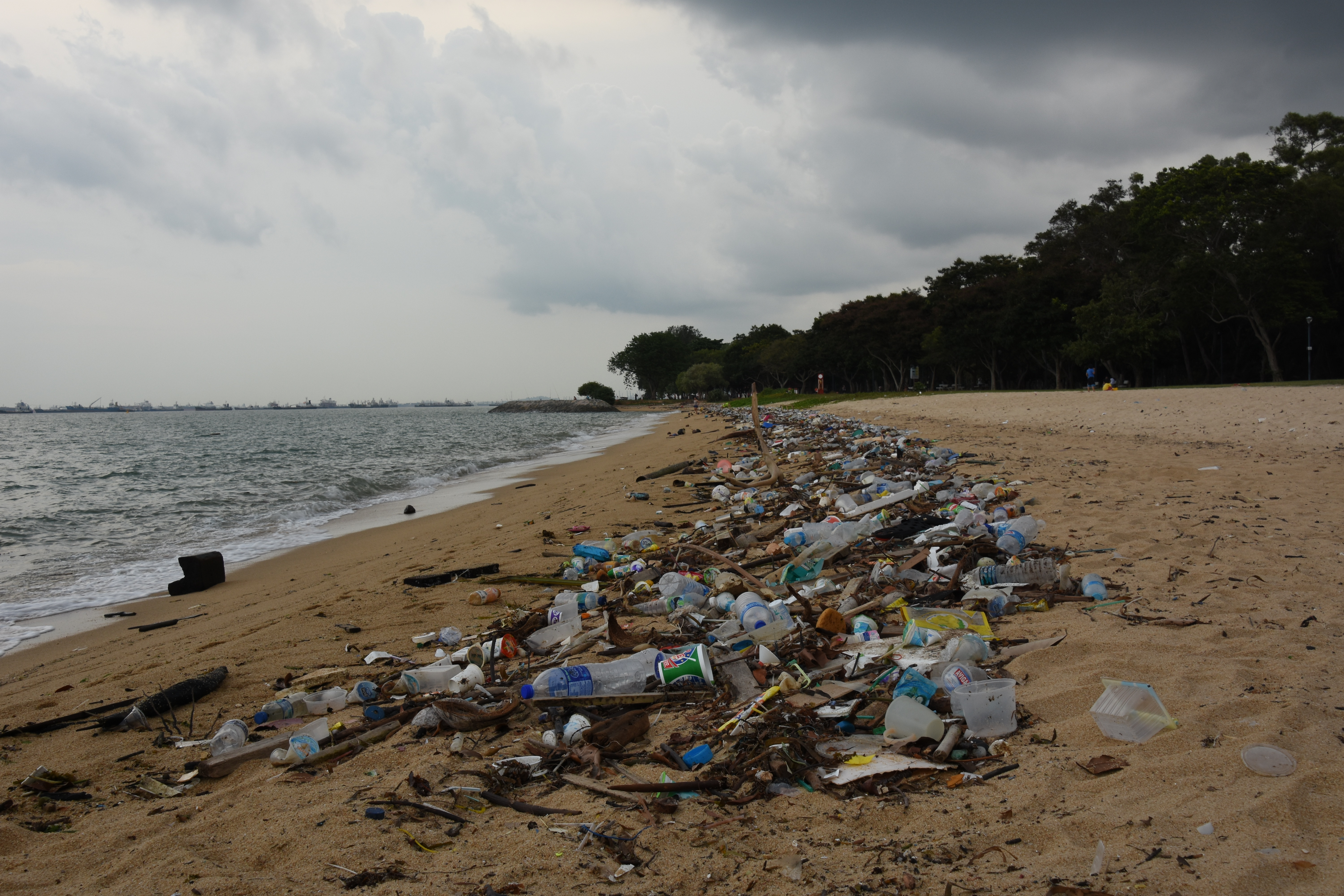
Washed-up plastic waste on a beach in Singapore

The garbage patches are one of several oceanic regions where researchers have studied the effects and impact of plastic photodegradation in the neustonic layer of water. Unlike organic debris, which biodegrades, plastic disintegrates into ever smaller pieces while remaining a polymer (without changing chemically). This process continues down to the molecular level. Some plastics decompose within a year of entering the water, releasing potentially toxic chemicals such as bisphenol A, PCBs and derivatives of polystyrene.

As the plastic particles are primarily found in the pelagic layer of the ocean they experience high levels of photodegradation, which causes the plastics to break down into ever smaller pieces. These pieces eventually become so small that even microorganisms can ingest and metabolize them, converting the plastics into carbon dioxide. In some instances, these microplastics are absorbed directly into a microorganism's biomolecules. However, before reaching this state, any number of organisms could potentially interact with these plastics.

=== Climate change and air pollution aspects ===
Plastic pollution and climate change are linked together and the effects of both are complements. The toxins released by plastic pollutants breaking down and releasing into the air are causing climate change rates to move up and worsen as a fast pace. The way that plastic contributes to climate change issues is because of the way plastic is made. Through fossil fuels being used to run machinery creating more plastic, it is released into the air resulting in greenhouse gas emissions. The ocean contains millions of pounds of plastic residue and large pieces, but also contains most of the greenhouse gases produced. The plastics in the oceans emit greenhouse gases while breaking down in the water.

The greenhouse gases produced by the making of plastics makes it difficult for the ocean to trap in carbon and help slow the processes of climate change. Another way that plastic consumption and pollution results in increasing climate change rates, is from incineration of plastic waste. This releases way more toxins into the air and then it all gets consumed by ocean water. The oceans end up taking up chemicals, but also the small pieces of plastic that were not fully broken down. This causes dirty marine water and affects the ecosystems living in the oceans. The incineration of plastic products pushes black carbon into the air. Black carbon comes from emissions and is a lead contributor to climate change.

== Effects on animals ==
The feeding habit of sea turtles influences their reaction to artificial marine debris. (Video)

Plastic waste has reached all the world's oceans. This plastic pollution harms an estimated 100,000 sea turtles and marine mammals and 1,000,000 sea creatures each year. Larger plastics (called "macroplastics") such as plastic shopping bags can clog the digestive tracts of larger animals when consumed by them and can cause starvation through restricting the movement of food, or by filling the stomach and tricking the animal into thinking it is full. Microplastics on the other hand harm smaller marine life. For example, pelagic plastic pieces in the center of our ocean's gyres outnumber live marine plankton, and are passed up the food chain to reach all marine life.

Fishing gear such as nets, ropes, lines, and cages often get lost in the ocean and can travel large distances which has negatively impacted many marine animals such as coral. The fishing gear is made up of non-biodegradable plastic in many different species of coral get tangled in which causes them to lose tissue and possibly die.

Plastic pollution has the potential to poison animals, which can then adversely affect human food supplies. Plastic pollution has been described as being highly detrimental to large marine mammals, described in the book Introduction to Marine Biology as posing the "single greatest threat" to them. Some marine species, such as sea turtles, have been found to contain large proportions of plastics in their stomach. When this occurs, the animal typically starves, because the plastic blocks the animal's digestive tract. Sometimes marine mammals are entangled in plastic products such as nets, which can harm or kill them.

=== Entanglement ===
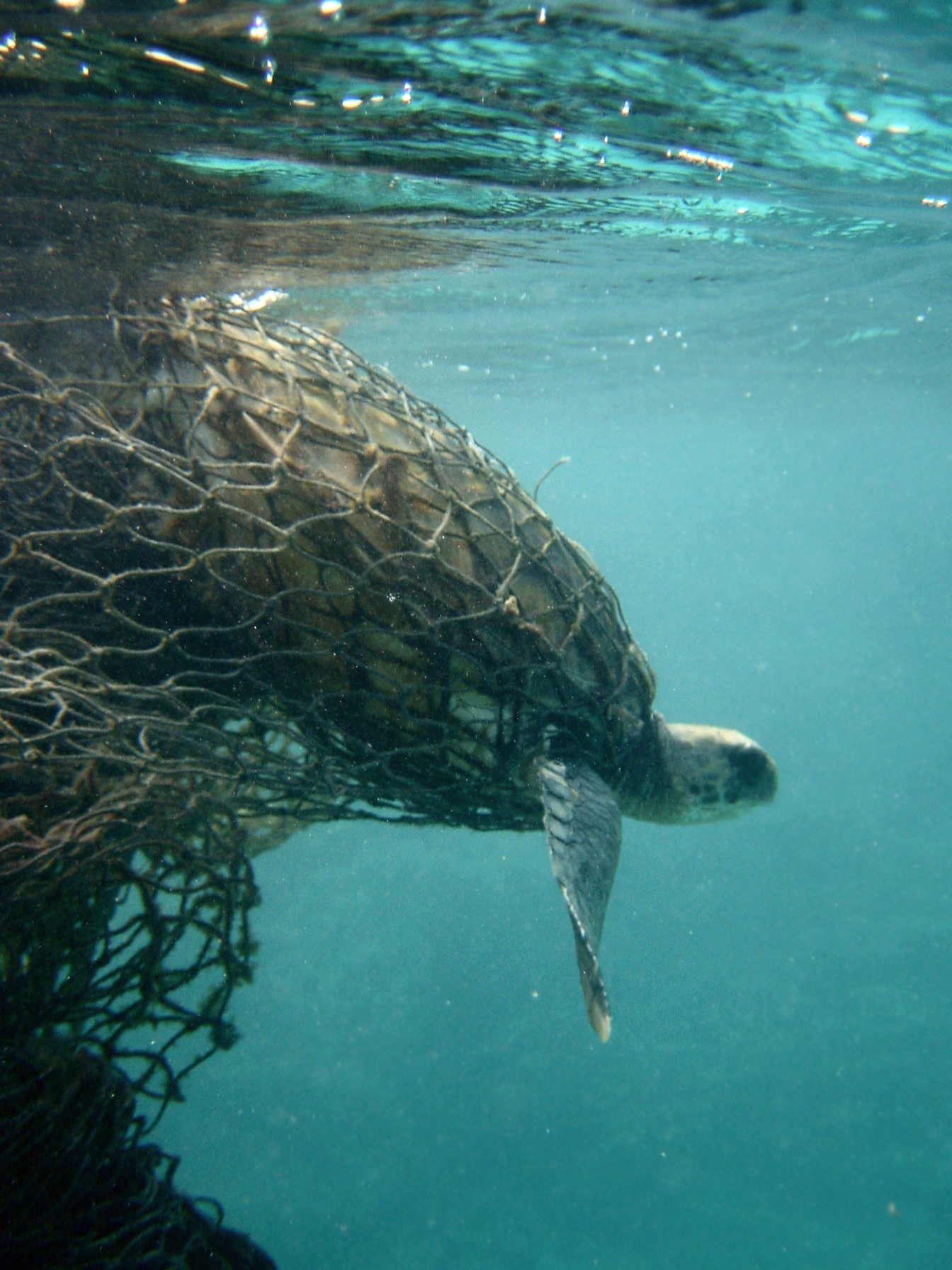
Sea turtle entangled in a ghost net

Entanglement in plastic debris has been responsible for the deaths of many marine organisms, such as fish, seals, turtles, and birds. These animals get caught in the debris and end up suffocating or drowning. Because they are unable to untangle themselves, they also die from starvation or from their inability to escape predators. Being entangled also often results in severe lacerations and ulcers. It was estimated that at least 267 different animal species have suffered from entanglement and ingestion of plastic debris. It has been estimated that over 400,000 marine mammals perish annually due to plastic pollution in oceans. Marine organisms get caught in discarded fishing equipment, such as ghost nets. Ropes and nets used to fish are often made of synthetic materials such as nylon, making fishing equipment more durable and buoyant. These organisms can also get caught in circular plastic packaging materials, and if the animal continues to grow in size, the plastic can cut into their flesh. Equipment such as nets can also drag along the seabed, causing damage to coral reefs.

Some marine animals find themselves tangled in larger pieces of garbage that cause just as much harm as the barely visible microplastics. Trash that has the possibility of wrapping itself around a living organism may cause strangulation or drowning. If the trash gets stuck around a ligament that is not vital for airflow, the ligament may grow with a malformation. Plastic's existence in the ocean becomes cyclical because marine life that is killed by it ultimately decompose in the ocean, re-releasing the plastics into the ecosystem.

Animals can also become trapped in plastic nets and rings, which can cause death. Plastic pollution affects at least 700 marine species, including sea turtles, seals, seabirds, fish, whales, and dolphins. Cetaceans have been sighted within the patch, which poses entanglement and ingestion risks to animals using the Great Pacific Garbage Patch as a migration corridor or core habitat.

=== Ingestion ===
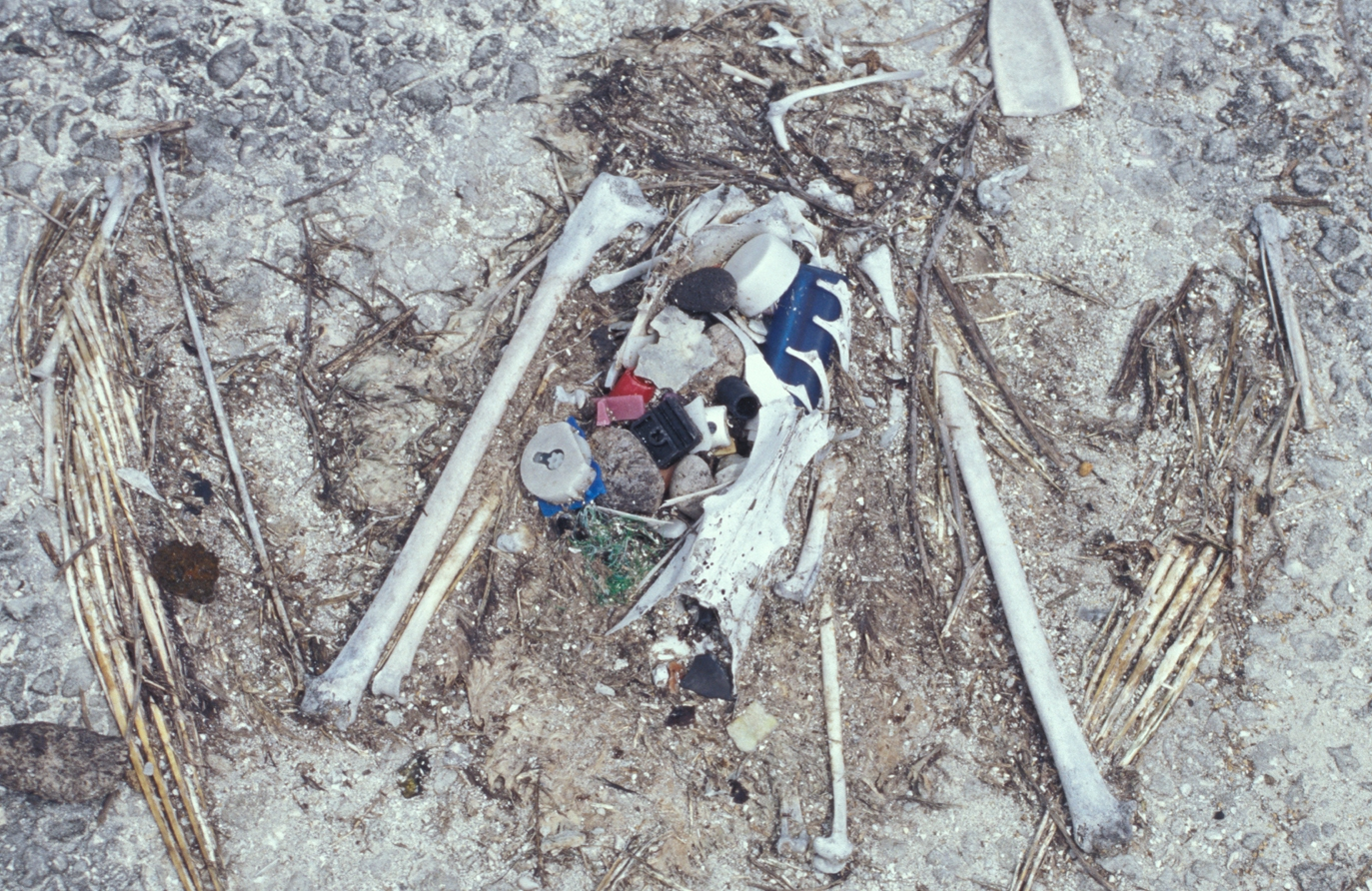
The remains of an albatross containing ingested flotsam

Many animals that live on or in the sea consume flotsam by mistake, as it often looks similar to their natural prey. Plastic debris, when bulky or tangled, is difficult to pass, and may become permanently lodged in the digestive tracts of these animals. Especially when evolutionary adaptions make it impossible for the likes of turtles to reject plastic bags, which resemble jellyfish when immersed in water, as they have a system in their throat to stop slippery foods from otherwise escaping. Thereby blocking the passage of food and causing death through starvation or infection.

Many of these long-lasting pieces end up in the stomachs of marine birds and animals, including sea turtles, and black-footed albatross. This results in obstruction of digestive pathways, which leads to reduced appetite or even starvation. In a 2008 Pacific Gyre voyage, Algalita Marine Research Foundation researchers began finding that fish are ingesting plastic fragments and debris. Of the 672 fish caught during that voyage, 35% had ingested plastic pieces.

With the increased amount of plastic in the ocean, living organisms are now at a greater risk of harm from plastic consumption and entanglement. Approximately 23% of aquatic mammals, and 36% of seabirds have experienced the detriments of plastic presence in the ocean. Since as much as 70% of the trash is estimated to be on the ocean floor, and microplastics are only millimeters wide, sealife at nearly every level of the food chain is affected. Animals who feed off of the bottom of the ocean risk sweeping microplastics into their systems while gathering food. Smaller marine life such as mussels and worms sometimes mistake plastic for their prey.

Larger animals are also affected by plastic consumption because they feed on fish, and are indirectly consuming microplastics already trapped inside their prey. Likewise, humans are also susceptible to microplastic consumption. People who eat seafood also eat some of the microplastics that were ingested by marine life. Oysters and clams are popular vehicles for human microplastic consumption. Animals who are within the general vicinity of the water are also affected by the plastic in the ocean. Studies have shown 36% species of seabirds are consuming plastic because they mistake larger pieces of plastic for food. Plastic can cause blockage of intestines as well as tearing of interior stomach and intestinal lining of marine life, ultimately leading to starvation and death.

Some long-lasting plastics end up in the stomachs of marine animals. Plastic attracts seabirds and fish. When marine life consumes plastic allowing it to enter the food chain, this can lead to greater problems when species that have consumed plastic are then eaten by other predators.

Multiple studies have found plastics and microplastics in the stomach contents of marine animals.

The ingestion of large amounts of plastic debris, such as fish nets and ropes, can lead to marine animal's deaths via gastric impaction.

==== Mammals and fish ====
A 2021 literature review published in Science identified 1,288 marine species that are known to ingest plastic. Most of these species are fish.

Sea turtles are affected by plastic pollution. Some species are consumers of jelly fish, but often mistake plastic bags for their natural prey. This plastic debris can kill the sea turtle by obstructing the oesophagus. Baby sea turtles are particularly vulnerable according to a 2018 study by Australian scientists.

Plastics are ingested by various species of whales, such as beaked whales, baleen whales, and sperm whales. They can mistake plastics for food and consume them accidentally when feeding on prey organisms that are gathered near plastics. Plastics can also enter their system if their prey already had synthetic plastic particles in their digestive tract via bioaccumulation. Large amounts of plastics have been found in the stomachs of beached whales. Plastic debris started appearing in the stomach of the sperm whale since the 1970s, and has been noted to be the cause of death of several whales. In June 2018, more than 80 plastic bags were found inside a dying pilot whale that washed up on the shores of Thailand. In March 2019, a dead Cuvier's beaked whale washed up in the Philippines with 88 lbs of plastic in its stomach. In April 2019, following the discovery of a dead sperm whale off of Sardinia with 48 pounds of plastic in its stomach, the World Wildlife Foundation warned that plastic pollution is one of the most dangerous threats to sea life, noting that five whales have been killed by plastic over a two-year period.

Some of the tiniest bits of plastic are being consumed by small fish, in a part of the pelagic zone in the ocean called the Mesopelagic zone, which is 200 to 1000 metres below the ocean surface, and completely dark. Not much is known about these fish, other than that there are many of them. They hide in the darkness of the ocean, avoiding predators and then swimming to the ocean's surface at night to feed. Plastics found in the stomachs of these fish were collected during Malaspina's circumnavigation, a research project that studies the impact of global change on the oceans.

A study conducted by Scripps Institution of Oceanography showed that the average plastic content in the stomachs of 141 mesopelagic fish over 27 different species was 9.2%. Their estimate for the ingestion rate of plastic debris by these fish in the North Pacific was between 12,000 and 24,000 tonnes per year. The most popular mesopelagic fish is the lantern fish. It resides in the central ocean gyres, a large system of rotating ocean currents. Since lantern fish serve as a primary food source for the fish that consumers purchase, including tuna and swordfish, the plastics they ingest become part of the food chain. The lantern fish is one of the main bait fish in the ocean, and it eats large amounts of plastic fragments, which in turn will not make them nutritious enough for other fish to consume.

Another study found bits of plastic outnumber baby fish by seven to one in nursery waters off Hawaii. After dissecting hundreds of larval fish, the researchers discovered that many fish species ingested plastic particles. Plastics were also found in flying fish, which are eaten by top predators such as tunas and most Hawaiian seabirds.

Deep sea animals have been found with plastics in their stomachs. In 2020, deep sea species Eurythenes plasticus was discovered, with one of the samples already having plastics in its gut; it was named to highlight the impacts of plastic pollution.

It was found in 2016–2017 that more than 35% of south Pacific Lanternfish had consumed plastic particles. When ingested by the fish, the chemical compounds found in these plastics cannot be digested. This can affect humans, as the Lanternfish is a food source for both salmon and tuna. Fish and whales may also mistake the plastic as a food source.

===== Birds =====
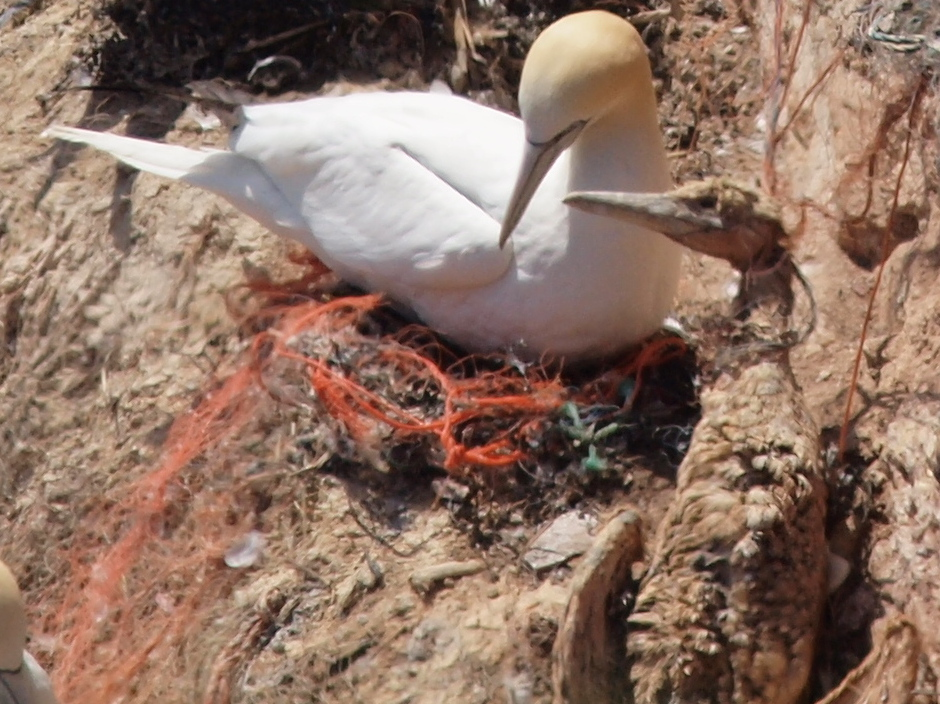
Northern gannet on Helgoland, Germany, trapped in their nests that are built only of old nets and other plastic waste

Plastic pollution does not only affect animals that live solely in oceans. Seabirds are also greatly affected. In 2004, it was estimated that gulls in the North Sea had an average of thirty pieces of plastic in their stomachs. Seabirds often mistake trash floating on the ocean's surface as prey. Their food sources often has already ingested plastic debris, thus transferring the plastic from prey to predator. Ingested trash can obstruct and physically damage a bird's digestive system, reducing its digestive ability and can lead to malnutrition, starvation, and death. Toxic chemicals called polychlorinated biphenyls (PCBs) also become concentrated on the surface of plastics at sea and are released after seabirds eat them. These chemicals can accumulate in body tissues and have serious lethal effects on a bird's reproductive ability, immune system, and hormone balance. Floating plastic debris can produce ulcers, infections and lead to death. Marine plastic pollution can even reach birds that have never been at the sea. Parents may accidentally feed their nestlings plastic, mistaking it for food. Seabird chicks are the most vulnerable to plastic ingestion since they cannot vomit up their food like the adult seabirds.

Plasticosis is a type of fibrotic disease initially found in one species of bird in 2023.

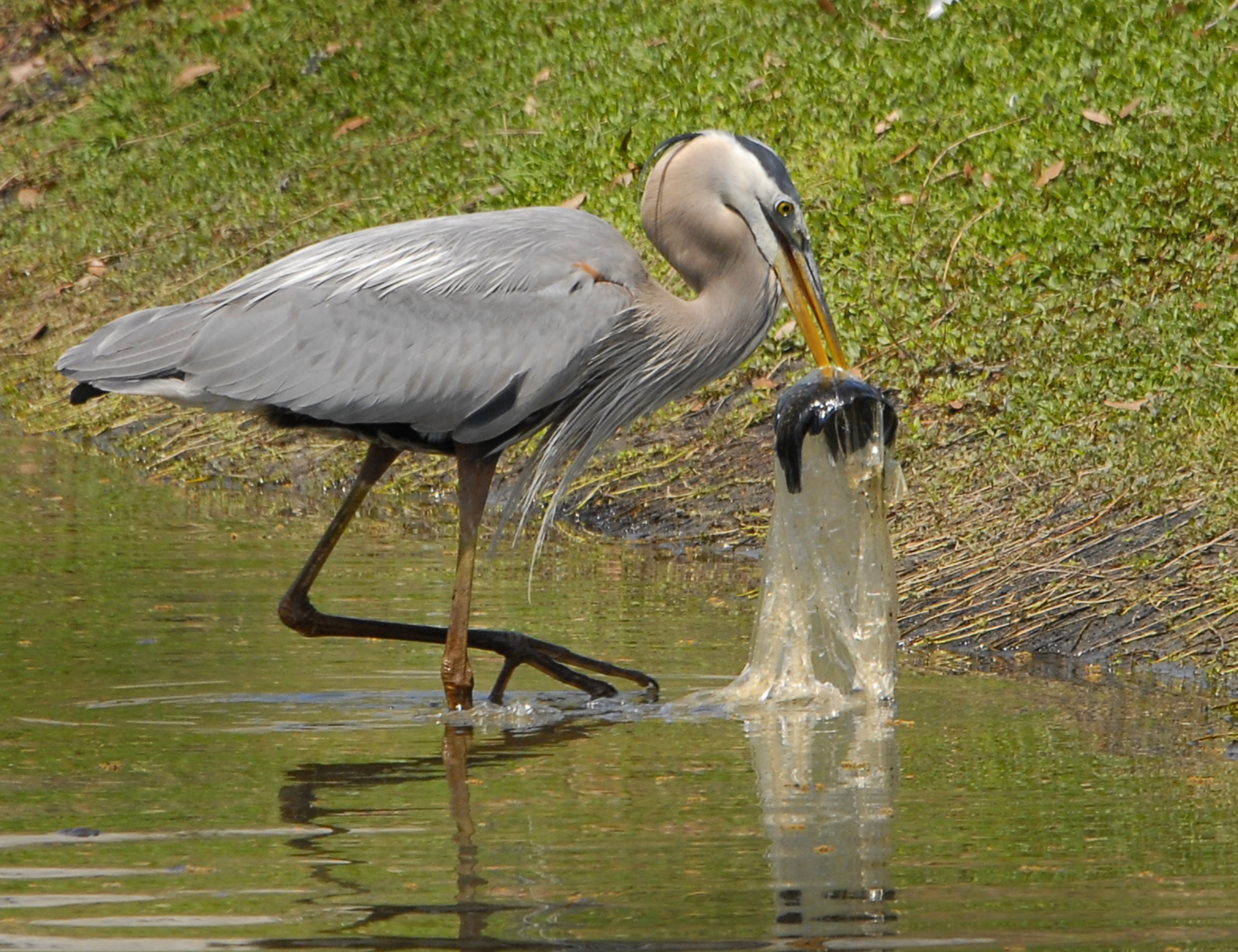
A great blue heron capturing a fish already caught in a plastic bag – birds and other wildlife regularly consume plastic when it gets entangled with or confused with food.

After the initial observation that many of the beaches in New Zealand had high concentrations of plastic pellets, further studies found that different species of prion ingest the plastic debris. Hungry prions mistook these pellets for food, and these particles were found intact within the birds' gizzards and proventriculi. Pecking marks similar to those made by northern fulmars in cuttlebones have been found in plastic debris, such as styrofoam, on the beaches on the Dutch coast, showing that this species of bird also mistake plastic debris for food.

Of the 1.5 million Laysan albatrosses that inhabit Midway Atoll, nearly all are likely to have plastic in their gastrointestinal tract. Approximately one-third of their chicks die, and many of those deaths are from plastic unwittingly fed to them by their parents. Twenty tons of plastic debris washes up on Midway every year with five tons ending up in the bellies of albatross chicks. These seabirds choose red, pink, brown, and blue plastic pieces because of similarities to their natural food sources. As a result of plastic ingestion, the digestive tract can be blocked resulting in starvation. The windpipe can also be blocked, which results in suffocation. The debris can also accumulate in the animal's gut, and give them a false sense of fullness which would also result in starvation. On the shore, thousands of birds corpses can be seen with plastic remaining where the stomach once was. The durability of the plastics is visible among the remains. In some instances, the plastic piles are still present while the bird's corpse has decayed.

Similar to humans, animals exposed to plasticizers can experience developmental defects. Specifically, sheep have been found to have lower birth weights when prenatally exposed to bisphenol A. Exposure to BPA can shorten the distance between the eyes of a tadpole. It can also stall development in frogs and can result in a decrease in body length. In different species of fish, exposure can stall egg hatching and result in a decrease in body weight, tail length, and body length.

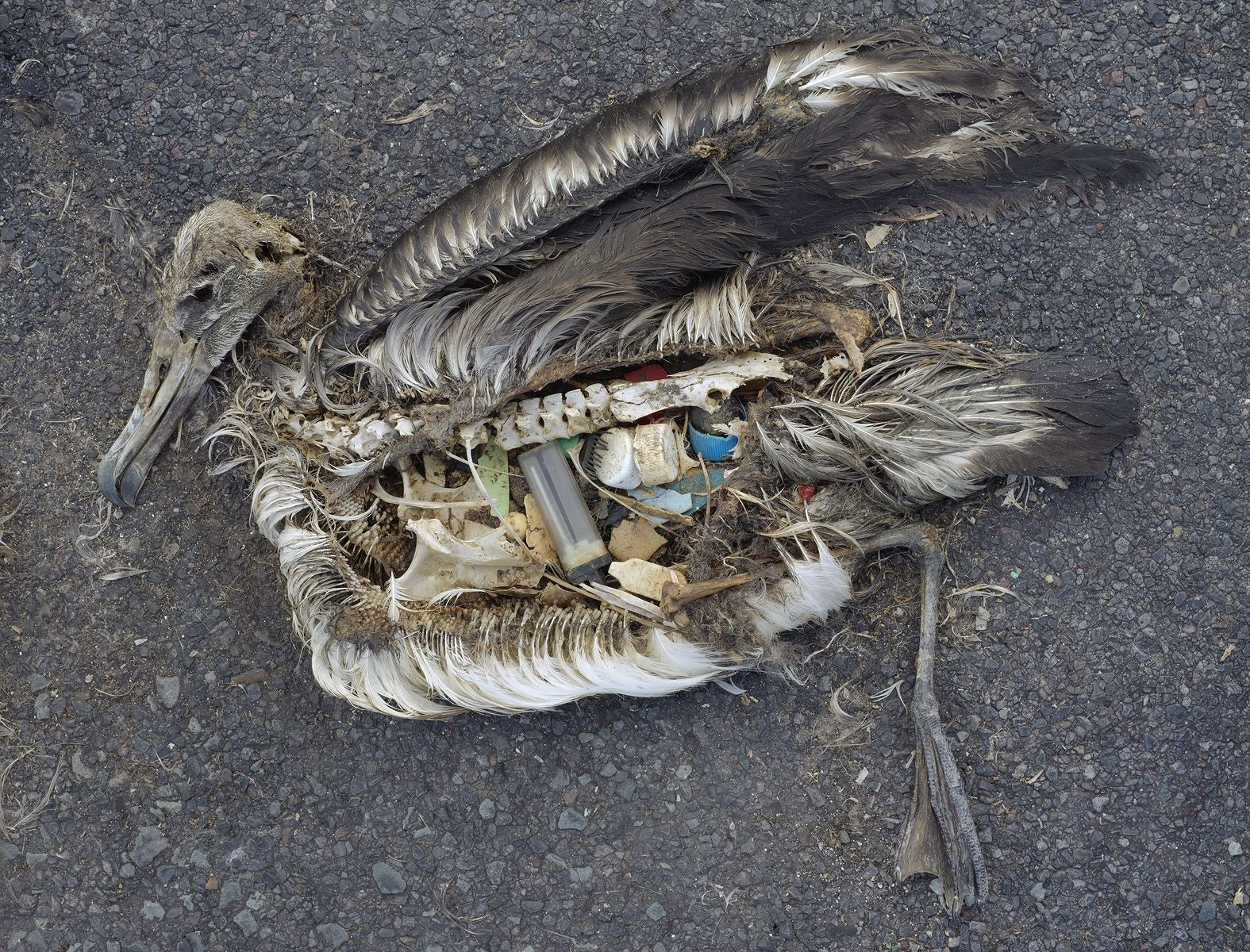
The unaltered stomach contents of a dead albatross chick include a variety of plastic marine debris.

A study found that in 1960 less than 5% of seabirds were found to have consumed waste material, while as of August 2015 that figure climbed to about 90%. It is predicted that by 2050, 99% of seabirds will have consumed such materials. Scientists studying the stomach contents of Laysan albatross chicks report a 40% mortality rate before fledging. When the stomach contents were analyzed following necropsies, they were found to contain plastic waste. Not only do plastic pellets used in manufacturing worldwide absorb toxic chemicals such as DDT and PCBs from the water, but they can even leach chemicals such as biphenyl. It is estimated that up to 267 marine species are affected by plastic pollution.

Coral

Lost fish nets or ghost nets make up around 46% of what is known as the Great Pacific Garbage Patch and have had a negative impact on many different species of coral as they often accidentally trap themselves in these nets. These fishing nets have caused tissue loss, algae growth, and fragmentation of coral. In addition, as coral gets trapped in different types of fishing gear, this causes coral to develop stress as they are not in a favorable condition, which causes coral to break and die off. According to multiple research studies, Tubastraea micranthus is a type of coral species that appears to be the most impacted by fishing gear in the ocean because of its branches and its ability to grow on top of fishing gear such as nets, ropes, and lines.

Phytoplankton

In 2019 and 2020 there were week-long studies done in Australia along the Georges River to measure the number of microplastics. The purpose of these studies was to determine if phytoplankton living in the river were being affected by the microplastics in the water. The studies included the completion of microcosm experiments where water samples were collected in bottles from the river and then filtered. In addition, microplastic solutions were made along with the collection of phytoplankton from the same river. After the studies were complete, scientists found out that there were very high concentrations of microplastics in the river which have negatively impacted phytoplankton such as cyanobacteria.

As many different species of phytoplankton are being exposed to microplastics in the Georges River, not only does this impact the lives of the phytoplankton themselves, but also affects other animals in their food chain. Phytoplankton are primary producers; therefore, when microplastics are ingested, other living organisms in the environment that feed on phytoplankton also ingest microplastics.

Fin Whales

In the Mediterranean Sea, studies have been performed to determine how the number of microplastics on the surface level of the ocean has affected fin whale populations. In the study, researchers collected samples of microplastics during the day when there was little to no wave action. The plastic pieces collected from the samples were then observed under a microscope to determine their size and whether they were microplastics or mesoplastics. The fin whale population's habitat was then observed where the zooplankton population was measured along with sea surface chlorophyll levels within their habitat. The Tyrreno-ROMS model was used to measure the ocean current or gyres along with the sea surface temperatures in the fin whales' habitat within the Mediterranean Sea.

The results of the studies indicated that there were high levels of microplastics within the surface level of the Mediterranean Sea which is the fin whales' habitat and serves as the location of their food source mainly during the summer months. The results indicate that when fin whales search for food to eat on the surface level of the ocean, they often accidentally consume microplastics. These microplastics have many toxins and chemicals that could harm the fin whale if they consume them as these toxins are then stored in the tissues of the fin whale for long periods of time.

=== Other ===
A study from 2019 indicates that the large amounts of plastic in the Great Pacific Garbage Patch could affect the behavior and distribution of some marine animals, as they can act as fish aggregating devices (FAD). FADs can attract feeding cetaceans, thus increasing the risk of being entangled or ingesting additional plastic.

== Effects on humans ==
Nanoplastics can penetrate the intestine tissue in aquatic creatures and can end up in the human food chain by inhalation (breathing) or ingestion (eating), particularly through shellfish and crustaceans. Ingestion of plastics has been associated with a variety of reproductive, carcinogenic, and mutagenic effects. The most well-known organic synthetic compound used in many plastics is bisphenol A (BPA). It has been linked with autoimmune disease and endocrine disrupting agents, leading to reduced male fertility and breast cancer. Phthalate esters are also linked to causing reproductive effects due to being found in packing products for food. The toxins from phthalate esters affect the developing male reproductive system. Diethylhexyl phthalate is also suspected to disrupt the functions of the thyroid; however, studies are currently inconclusive.

Plastics in the human body can stop or slow down detoxification mechanisms, causing acute toxicity and lethality. They have the potential to affect the central nervous system and reproductive system, although this would be unlikely unless exposure levels were very high and absorption levels were increased. In vitro studies from human cells showed evidence that polystyrene nanoparticles are taken up and can induce oxidative stress and pro-inflammatory responses.

== Reduction efforts ==
Solutions to marine plastic pollution, along with plastic pollution within the whole environment will be intertwined with changes in manufacturing and packaging practices, and a reduction in the usage, in particular, of single or short-lived plastic products. Many ideas exist for cleaning up plastic in the oceans including trapping plastic particles at river mouths before entering the ocean, and cleaning up the ocean gyres.

=== Collection in the ocean ===
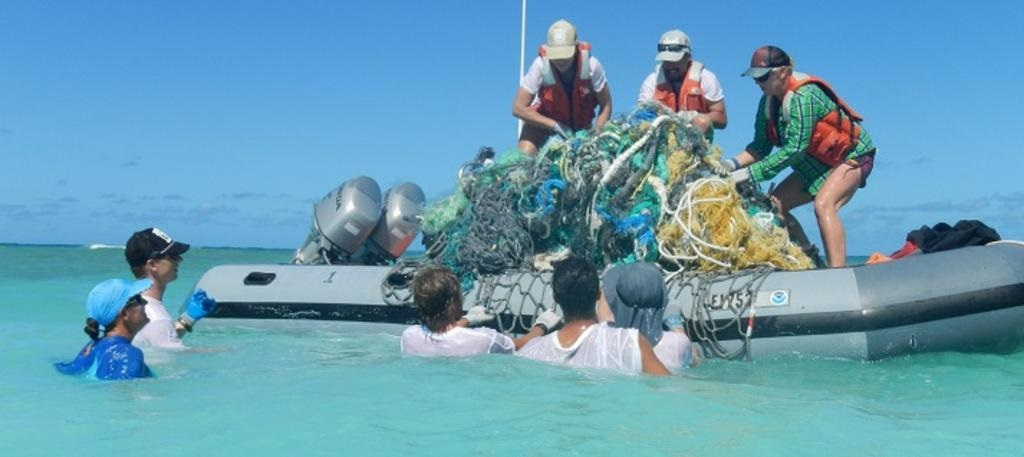
NOAA's marine debris removal in 2014

Plastics pollution in the oceans might be irreversible. Once microplastics enter the marine environment, they are extremely difficult and expensive to remove.

The organization "The Ocean Cleanup" is trying to collect plastic waste from the oceans by nets. There are concerns from harm to some forms of sea organisms, especially neuston.

At TEDxDelft2012, Boyan Slat unveiled a concept for removing large amounts of marine debris from oceanic gyres. Calling his project The Ocean Cleanup, he proposed to use surface currents to let debris drift to collection platforms. Operating costs would be relatively modest and the operation would be so efficient that it might even be profitable. The concept makes use of floating booms that divert rather than catch the debris. This avoids bycatch, while collecting even the smallest particles. According to Slat's calculations, a gyre could be cleaned up in five years' time, amounting to at least 7.25 million tons of plastic across all gyres. He also advocated "radical plastic pollution prevention methods" to prevent gyres from reforming. In 2015, The Ocean Cleanup project was a category winner in the Design Museum's 2015 Designs of the Year awards. A fleet of 30 vessels, including a 32-metre (105-foot) mothership, took part in a month-long voyage to determine how much plastic is present using trawls and aerial surveys.

The organization "everwave" uses special rubbish collection boats in rivers and estuaries to prevent rubbish from entering the world's oceans.

There is also Ocean Plastic Utilisation Ships System R&D project (OPUSS). The main objective of this project is to make the ocean cleaning process commercially realistic in time, environmentally efficient and viable in general. The central idea of the OPUSS project lies in developing new circular logistic scheme of the ocean cleanup, as existing reverse logistics supply chains are not able to capture the specifics of the plastic waste collection out on the ocean. The main target of a project is cleaning the ocean with optimal results in terms of logistics and construction costs, as well as with minimal operating costs.

==== Plastic-to-fuel conversion strategy ====
The Clean Oceans Project (TCOP) promotes conversion of the plastic waste into valuable liquid fuels, including gasoline, diesel and kerosene, using plastic-to-fuel conversion technology developed by Blest Co. Ltd., a Japanese environmental engineering company. TCOP plans to educate local communities and create a financial incentive for them to recycle plastic, keep their shorelines clean, and minimize plastic waste.

In 2019, a research group led scientists of Washington State University found a way to turn plastic waste products into jet fuel.

Also, the company "Recycling Technologies", has come up with a simple process that can convert plastic waste to an oil called Plaxx. The company is led by a team of engineers from the university of Warwick.

Other companies working on a system for converting plastic waste to fuel include GRT Group and OMV.

=== Policies and legislation ===
Shortcomings in the existing international policy framework include: "the focus on sea-based sources of marine plastic pollution; the prevalence of soft law instruments; and the fragmentation of the existing international regulatory framework". Four aspects are important for an integrated approach to solve the problem of marine plastic pollution: harmonization of international laws (action example: develop a new global plastics treaty); coherence across national policies; coordination of international organizations (action example: identify a leading coordinating organization (e.g., UN Environment Programme (UNEP)); and science-policy interaction. These shortcomings are often listed as drivers for the advancement of a global plastics treaty. The development of such a treaty is underway as of March 2022 and is expected to conclude by the end of 2024.

In the EU it is estimated that banning the intentional addition of microplastics to cosmetics, detergents, paints, polish and coatings, among others, would reduce emissions of microplastics by about 400,000 tonnes over 20 years.

The trade in plastic waste from industrialized countries to developing countries has been identified as the main cause of marine litter because countries importing the waste plastics often lack the capacity to process all the material. Therefore, the United Nations has imposed a ban on waste plastic trade unless it meets certain criteria. The global plastic waste trade when it comes into effect in January 2021.

== History ==
=== Background ===
Plastic pollution was first found in central gyres, or rotating ocean currents in which these observations from the Sargasso Sea were included in the 1972 Journal Science. In 1986, a group of undergraduate students conducted research by recording how much plastic they came across on their ship while traveling across the Atlantic Ocean. Their research led to them being able to collect useful and long term data about plastic in the Atlantic Ocean along with Charles Moore being able to discover the Great Pacific Garbage Patch. In addition, the undergraduate students' research helped lead to the invention of the term "microplastics".

=== Terminology ===
Microplastics

The term "microplastics" was first used by Richard Thompson in 2004 as he described microplastics to be small pieces of plastic, specifically less than 5 mm, that are found in the ocean and other bodies of water. After Thompson's invention of the term "microplastics", many scientists have conducted research to try to determine the effects that microplastics have in the ocean.

==== Plastic soup ====
The term "plastic soup" was coined by Charles J. Moore in 1997, after he found patches of plastic pollution in the North Pacific Gyre between Hawaii and California. This Great Pacific Garbage Patch had previously been described in 1988 by scientists who used the term neuston plastic to describe "The size fraction of plastic debris caught in nets designed to catch surface plankton (hereafter referred to as neuston plastic)", and acknowledged that earlier studies in the 1970s had shown that "neuston plastic is widespread, is most abundant in the central and western North Pacific, and is distributed by currents and winds".

In 2006, Ken Weiss published an article in the Los Angeles Times which was the first to make the public aware about the effects of the Garbage Patch in the Pacific Ocean. In 2009, a group of researchers decided to go out into the Pacific Ocean to prove if the Great Pacific Garbage Patch was real or a myth. After days out on the sea, the research group came across hundreds of plastic pieces in the ocean that were seen as a soup of microplastics rather than large pieces of plastics as expected.

The term is sometimes used to refer only to pollution by microplastics, pieces of plastic less than 5mm in size such as fibres shed from synthetic textiles in laundry: the British National Federation of Women's Institutes passed a resolution in 2017 headlined "End Plastic Soup" but concentrating on this aspect of pollution.

The Amsterdam-based Plastic Soup Foundation is an advocacy group which aims to raise awareness of the problem, educate people, and support the development of solutions.

As of January 2019, the Oxford English Dictionary did not include the terms plastic soup, neuston plastic or neustonic plastic, but it defined the term microplastic (or micro-plastic) as "Extremely small pieces of plastic, manufactured as such (in the form of nurdles or microbeads) or resulting from the disposal and breakdown of plastic products and waste" and its illustrative quotations all relate to marine pollution, the earliest being a 1990 reference in the South African Journal of Science: "The mean frequency of micro-plastic particles increased from 491 m1 of beach in 1984 to 678 m1 in 1989".

== See also ==
- Plastic pollution

== Sources ==
This article incorporates text from a free content work. Licensed under Cc BY-SA 3.0 IGO (license statement/permission). Text taken from Drowning in Plastics – Marine Litter and Plastic Waste Vital Graphics, United Nations Environment Programme.

=== Further reading ===
- Dunning, Brian (16 December 2008). "Skeptoid #132: The Sargasso Sea and the Pacific Garbage Patch". Skeptoid.
