= Plasticosis =

Disease caused by small pieces of plastic

- Specialty: Pathology
- Risk factors: Plastic ingestion

The term “plasticosis” was first used in the early 1990s by Pat Campbell, a human doctor and joint implantation researcher, to describe inflammation from degrading polyethylene joint implants in human patients. In 2022, Branson W. Ritchie, a veterinary researcher and recognized expert in animal health who serves as co-director of the University of Georgia New Materials Institute and as director of the Infectious Diseases Laboratory, used the term “plasticosis” in a presentation he made to the International Ornithologists’ Union (IOU) for their 2022 IOU Webinar Series. That presentation was transcribed in early 2026 and updated with recent scientific findings. The original presentation, the transcript with updated science, and all citations are available on the UGA New Material Institute’s website (Plasticosis: An emerging multi-systemic disease [Video and Transcript]). Dr. Ritchie has made similar presentations on this topic at professional conferences in 2019 (Hygienix, Orlando, Florida), 2019 (Plastic Free World Conference & Expo, Frankfurt, Germany), and 2020 [Veterinary Meeting & Expo (VMX), Orlando, Florida].

In recent years, more researchers have used the term “plasticosis” to describe an expanding association between environmentally persistent plastic particles and diseases in humans and animals. At the UGA New Materials Institute, researchers look for stronger associations between plastic particles and their potential impact on health, as documented through anatomic and clinical pathology.

== Plasticosis in birds ==
A 2023 study by Hayley Charlton-Howard, Alex Bond, Jack Rivers-Auty, and Jennifer Lavers, found that plastic pollution caused disease in seabirds. The researchers used the term plasticosis to describe a form of fibrotic scarring that is caused by small pieces of plastic which inflame the digestive tract. “Further, the ingestion of plastic has far-reaching and severe consequences, many of which we are only just beginning to fully document and understand.”

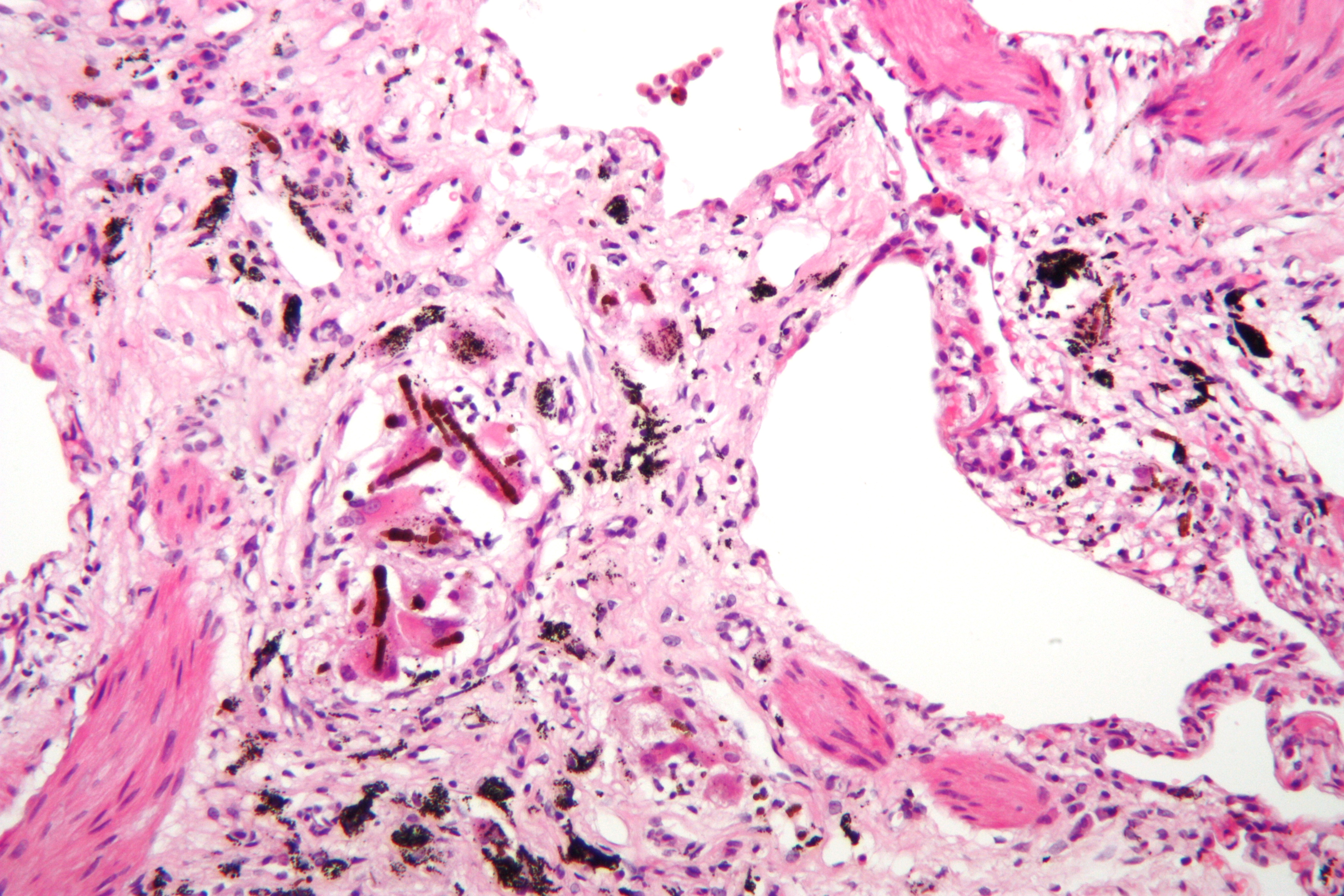
Example of fibrosis

The disease is caused only by plastic according to the study.

According to this 2023 study, plasticosis is a pathological wound healing in which connective tissue replaces normal parenchymal tissue to the extent that it goes unchecked, leading to considerable tissue remodelling and the formation of permanent scar tissue. Repeated injuries, chronic inflammation and repair are susceptible to fibrosis where an accidental excessive accumulation of extracellular matrix components, such as the collagen is produced by fibroblasts, leading to the formation of a permanent fibrotic scar.

=== Pathogenesis ===
Plasticosis was first identified in Flesh-footed Shearwaters (Ardenna carneipes) on Lord Howe Island, Australia. Previous research on this population found that ~90% of necropsied chicks contained ingested plastics, which are thought to negatively affect chick growth and survival. Microscopic pieces of plastic have also been found embedded in tissues of this species, causing inflammation and tissue damage, as well as loss of tubular glands and rugae. Plastic-induced fibrosis has been previously demonstrated in recent laboratory studies, in organs such as the heart, liver, ovaries, and uterus.

Plasticosis is found to cause increased collagen prevalence in the tubular glands and submucosa, and widespread scar tissue formation across the whole organ, leading to extensive reorganisation and tissue damage, and potentially a loss of tissue function. Since tubular glands produce mucus to protect the epithelium, as well as fluids that are crucial for digestion and nutrient absorption, plasticosis may affect the ability of birds to prevent injury or infection in the stomach and reduce stomach function. Excessive scar tissue formation in the stomach wall and loss of rugae induced by plastics may also reduce the ability of the stomach to expand, potentially reducing stomach capacity and function. Plasticosis has been compared to asbestosis and silicosis, where plastic acts a similar persistent irritant leading to fibrosis.

== See also ==
- Marine plastic pollution
- Marine pollution
- Microplastics
- Plastic pollution
- Seabird
