= Clean Oceans International =

American environmental organization

- Founded: 2009
- Founder: Jim Holm(Co-founder); Nick Drobac(Co-founder)
- Purpose: Ocean plastic pollution
- Location: Santa Cruz, California
- Region served: International
- Key people: Amelia Labbe Executive Director
- Volunteers: 3,100
- Website: cleanoceansinternational.org

Clean Oceans International, originally The Clean Oceans Project, is an ocean-oriented environmental organization founded in 2009 as an IRS 501c3 public benefit corporation. Clean Oceans International seeks to reduce plastic pollution in the oceans through a comprehensive global approach that includes research, technical innovation, public awareness, and efficient plastic waste management.

COI is based in Santa Cruz, California on the Santa Cruz Harbor, gateway to the Monterey Bay National Marine Sanctuary.

== Clean Oceans International’s Vision, Mission, and Goals ==
COI’s Vision is a healthy marine environment free of plastic pollution. COI’s Mission is to reduce oceanic plastic pollution through research, innovation, and direct action.

COI’s Goals are twofold: Track plastic pollution over time: Provide accurate, up-to-date, and historical data through our global Environmental Plastic Assessment Program (EPAP), enabling informed decisions and more effective action.

Develop scalable, sustainable recycling infrastructure: Deploy Portable Plastic Waste Conversion (PPWC) systems to transform plastic waste into financially viable, locally-managed resources in communities worldwide.

== Plastic Waste Conversion Strategy ==
Clean Oceans International (COI) promotes conversion of the plastic waste into valuable liquid fuels, including gasoline, diesel, and paraffin, using plastic-to-fuel conversion technology.

COI is conducting research with nonprofit, academic, and government organizations including Oregon State University and PDO Technologies.

== Education Efforts ==
COI is working to improve plastic pollution assessment in shorelines and other environments (oceans, lakes, and rivers) through a program called the Environmental Plastic Assessment Program (EPAP). EPAP is a simple, cost-effective survey method to document changes in quality, quantity, and source of plastic debris in given locations over time to determine the efficacy of mitigation measures. EPAP surveys also serves as a platform for educating and engaging communities on the local and global impacts of plastic pollution.

COI is also working in collaboration with Cabrillo Community College, and Berkeley City College where students are participating with EPAP through their coursework or COI's Internship Program.
