= UpLink =

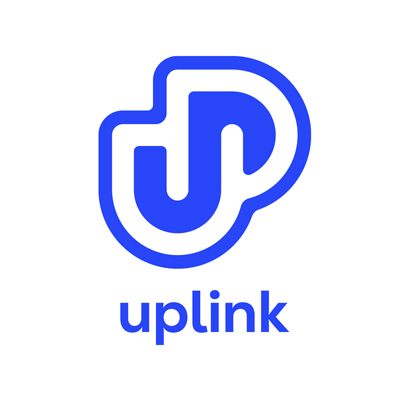
- Developer: Salesforce, Deloitte and the World Economic Forum

UpLink is an open, digital crowd-engagement platform, created to foster mass participation to meet the United Nations' 17 global Sustainable Development Goals (SDGs) in their 2030 Agenda. It is a collaboration platform created in partnership with Deloitte and Salesforce.

UpLink is available to everyone and allows users to register and contribute to different SDGs by responding to various thematic 'Challenges'. User's submissions have a chance to be selected as winners, joining the 'UpLink Innovation Ecosystem' and receiving support. The World Economic Forum (WEF) will oversee the online networking platform.

== History ==
At the United Nations' (U.N.) yearly summit in 2015, world leaders gathered together to adopt a 2030 Agenda for what the U.N. calls Sustainable Development Goals. These goals are meant to guide U.N. member states on how to face seventeen different core issues currently affecting humanity. On 18 January 2018, the World Economic Forum and International Finance Corporation (IFC) announced that they were to select fifty regional start-ups in Latin America to take part in the creation of the UpLink initiative, meant to tackle these core issues.

At the annual WEF event on 25 September 2019, it was announced publicly in New York that UpLink will be launched in January 2020 with the first SDG issue being tackled is "ocean" and water-related issues, also known as SDG 14. The remaining 16 SDGs will have other platforms set to be released in lieu with UpLink by beginning 2021. It is unknown whether these platforms will be separate or converged under the UpLink initiative.

At the Annual Meeting in Davos in January 2020, the World Economic Forum launched the platform at a session titled "UpLink: Linking Up the Next Generation of Change-Makers."

== See also ==
- Crowdsourcing
- Internet culture
