= Trojan Horse (disambiguation) =

The Trojan Horse, according to legend, was a giant hollow horse in which Greeks hid to gain entrance to Troy, also used metaphorically.

Trojan Horse may also refer to:

- Trojan horse (business), a business offer that appears to be a good deal but is not
- Trojan horse (computing), a computer program that appears harmless but is harmful

== Art, entertainment, and media ==
=== Fictional entities ===
- White Base or The Trojan Horse, a fictional battleship from Mobile Suit Gundam

=== Literature ===
- Caballo de Troya or Trojan Horse, a 1984 science fiction novel by Juan José Benitez
- Creationism's Trojan Horse, a 2004 book on the origins of the intelligent design movement, by Barbara Forrest and Paul R. Gross
- The Trojan Horse (novel), a 1940 novel by Hammond Innes
- The Trojan Horse (Morley novel), a novel by Christopher Morley
- Trojan Horse, a 2012 novel by Mark Russinovich

=== Music ===
- Trojan Horse (album), a 2026 album by Matt Proxy
- "Trojan Horse" (song), a 1978 song by Dutch girl group Luv'
- "Trojan Horse", a song by Bloc Party from the 2008 album Intimacy
- "Trojan Horse", a song by Agnes Obel from the 2016 album Citizen of Glass
- "Trojan Horse", a song by Dave and Central Cee from the 2023 EP Split Decision

=== Film and television ===
- The Trojan Horse, a 1946 Terrytoons Mighty Mouse short
- The Trojan Horse (film), the American title of the 1961 film La guerra di Troia
- The Trojan Horse (miniseries), a 2008 Canadian miniseries
- "Trojan Horse" (The Avengers), a 1964 episode
- "Trojan Horse" (The Bill), a 1990 episode
- "Trojan Horse" (NCIS), a 2007 episode
- "Trojan's Horse", a 2025 episode of Severance

== See also ==
- Operation Trojan Horse (book), a 1970 book by John Keel
- Trojan Horse scandal, a 2014 scandal involving claims of a plot by Muslims to take over schools in Birmingham
- Trojan Horse Incident, a 1985 incident in Athlone, Cape Town, in which police officers opened fire on stone-throwing protesters
- Trojan Horse effect, the transport of certain substances is accompanied by another, either in an organism or the environment
