= Microplastics =

Extremely small fragments of plastic

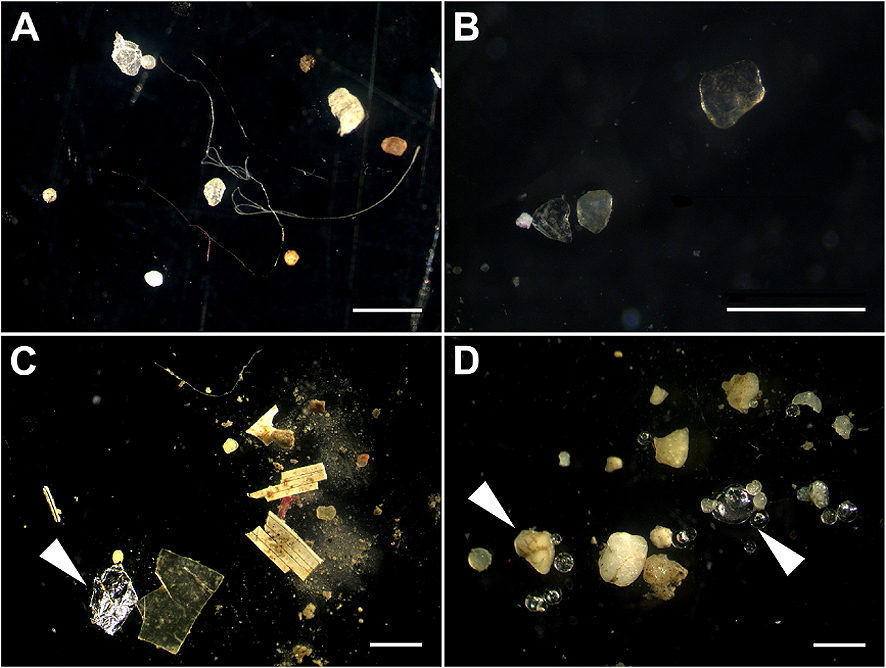
Micro plastics of diverse shapes in sediments from four rivers in Germany—‌white arrowheads indicate aluminium, glass and sand (white bars represent 1 mm for scale)

Photodegraded plastic straw. A light touch breaks the larger straw into microplastics.

Microplastics are "synthetic solid particulate matter or polymeric matrices, with regular or irregular shape and with size ranging from 1 μm to 5 mm, of either primary or secondary manufacturing origin, which are insoluble in water." Microplastics cause pollution by entering natural ecosystems from a variety of sources, including cosmetics, clothing, construction, renovation, food packaging, and industrial processes. However, there are different microplastic remediation strategies that can help mitigate the effects of plastic pollution.

The term microplastics is used to differentiate them from larger, non-microscopic plastic waste. Two classifications of microplastics are currently recognized. Primary microplastics include any plastic fragments or particles that are already 5 mm in size or less before entering the environment. These include microfibers from clothing, microbeads, plastic glitter and plastic pellets (also known as nurdles). Secondary microplastics arise from the degradation (breakdown) of larger plastic products through natural weathering processes after entering the environment. Such sources of secondary microplastics include water and soda bottles, fishing nets, plastic bags, microwave containers, tea bags and tire wear.

Both types are recognized to persist in the environment at high levels, particularly in aquatic and marine ecosystems, where they are considered water pollution. It is estimated that by 2050, the weight of microplastics in the sea will exceed that of the fish.

Microplastics also accumulate in the air and terrestrial ecosystems. Airborne microplastics have been detected in the atmosphere, as well as indoors and outdoors.

Because some plastics degrade slowly (often over hundreds to thousands of years), microplastics have a high probability of ingestion, incorporation into, and accumulation in the bodies and tissues of many organisms. In terrestrial ecosystems, microplastics have been demonstrated to lower the viability of soil ecosystems.

Microplastics are likely to degrade into smaller nanoplastics through chemical weathering processes, mechanical breakdown, and even through the digestive processes of animals. Nanoplastics are a subset of microplastics and are smaller than 1 μm (1 micrometer, or 1000 nm). Nanoplastics cannot be seen by the human eye.

== Classification ==
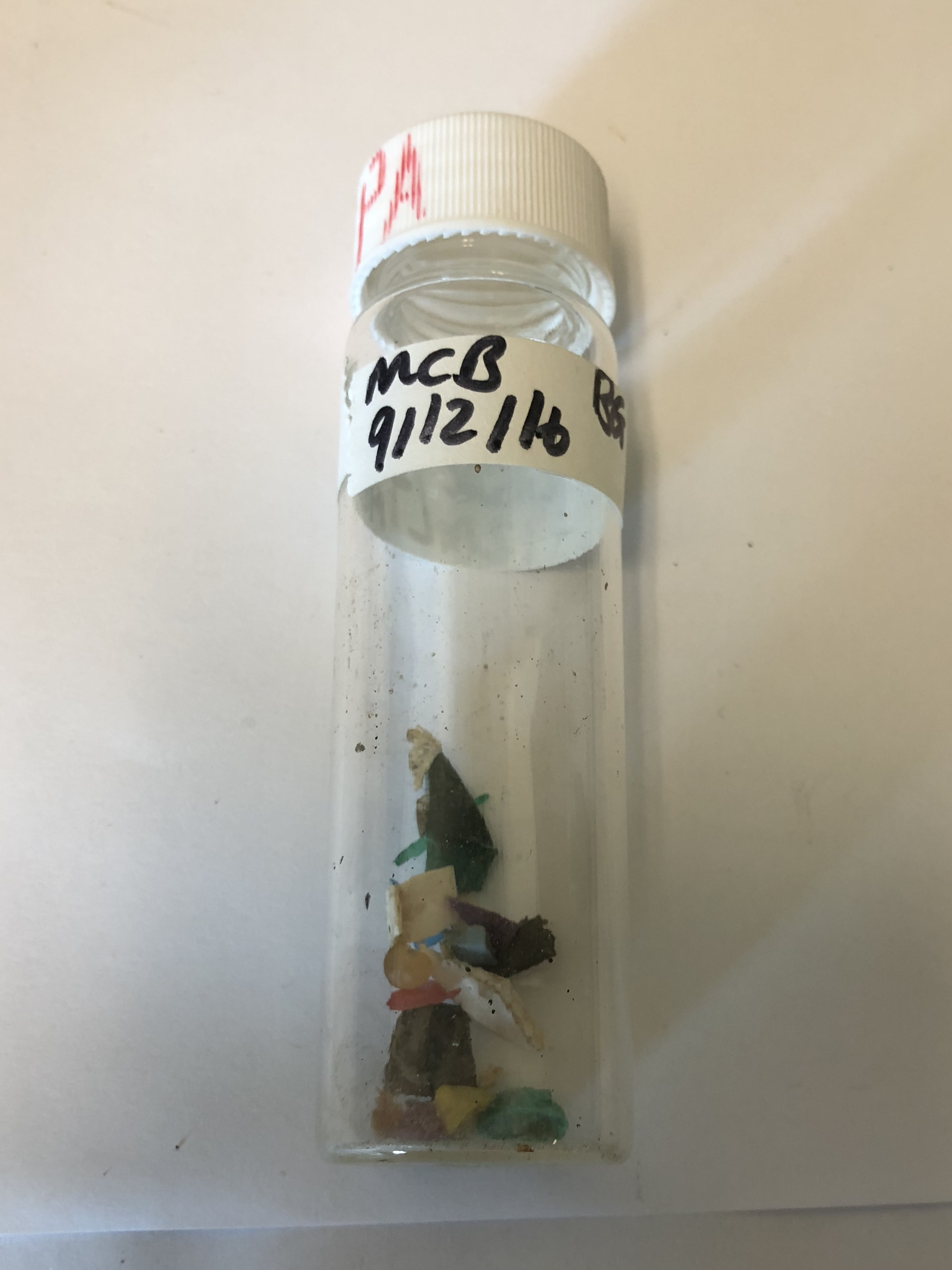
Microplastic samples.

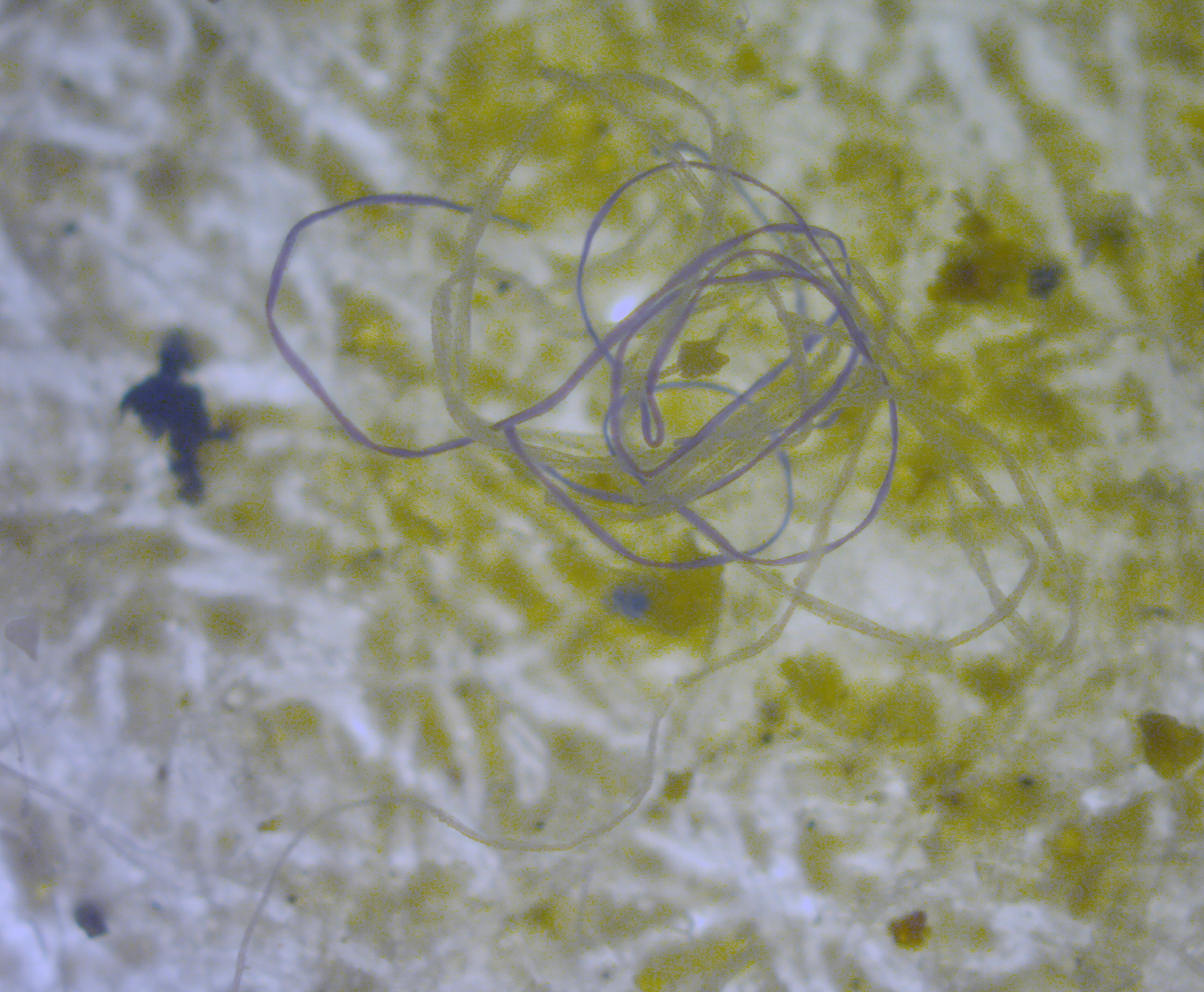
Microplastic fibers identified in the marine environment.

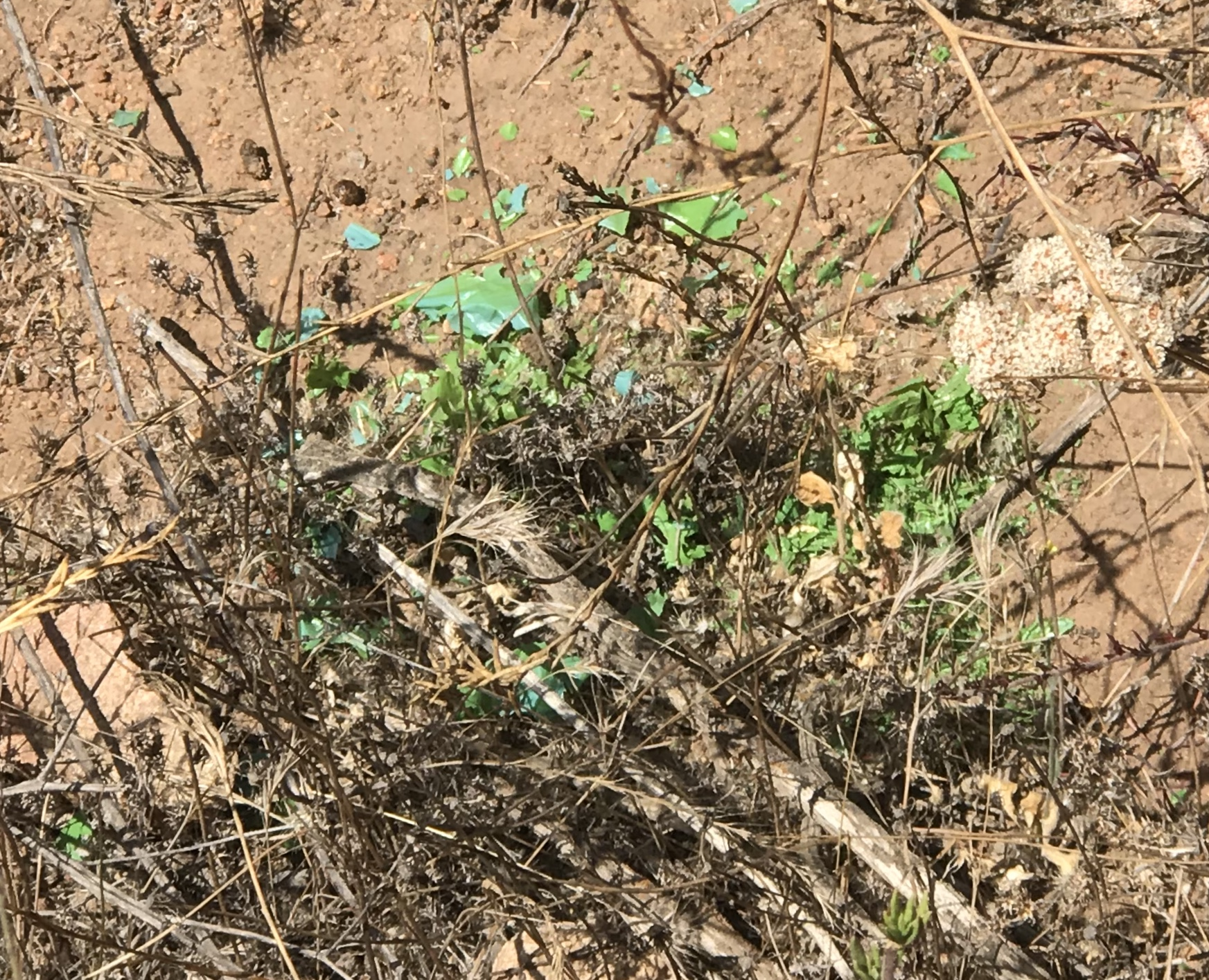
Photodegraded green plastic bag adjacent to hiking trail in about 2,000 pieces of 1 to 25 mm size after three months' exposure outdoors.

The term "microplastics" has been widely attributed to a 2004 paper by Professor Richard Thompson, a marine biologist at the University of Plymouth in the United Kingdom. However, there are examples of the term being used in relation to marine pollution dating back to the early 1990s, throughout the 1990s and into the early 2000s. There is also evidence that the authors who first used the term had been exploring the topic during the late 1980s.

Microplastics are common in our world today. In 2014, it was estimated that there are between 15 and 51 trillion individual pieces of microplastic in the world's oceans, which was estimated to weigh between 93,000 and 236,000 metric tons. Under the influence of sunlight, wind, waves and other factors, plastic degrades into small fragments known as microplastics, or even nanoplastics.

=== Primary microplastics ===
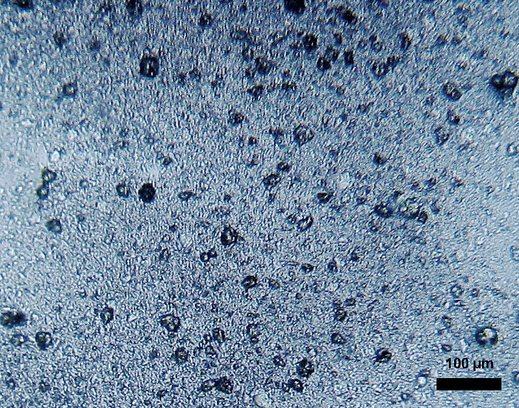
Polyethylene based microspherules in toothpaste.

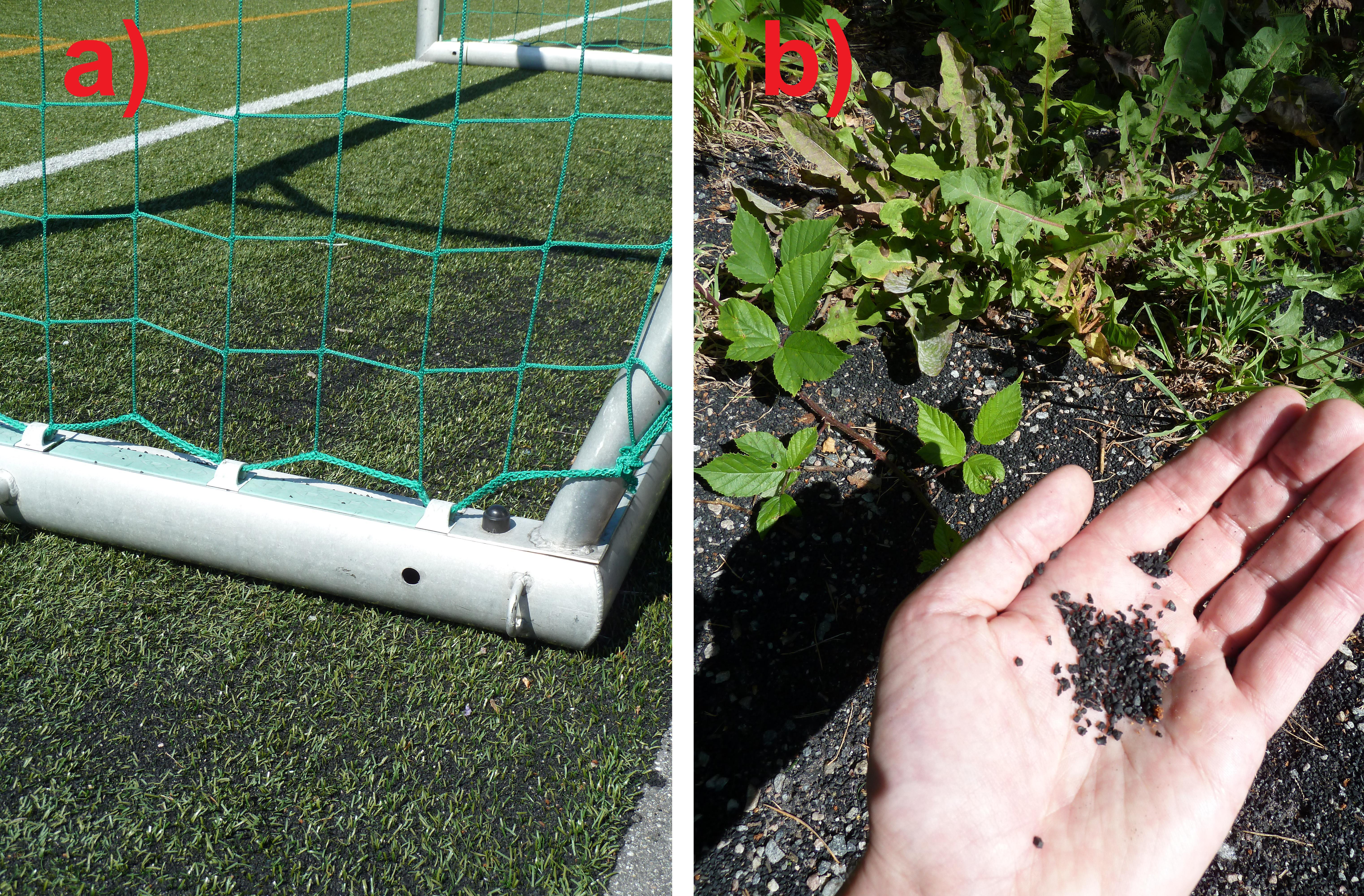
a) Artificial turf football field with ground tire rubber (GTR) used for cushioning. b) Microplastics from the same field, washed away by rain, found in nature close to a stream.

Primary microplastics are small pieces of plastic that are purposefully manufactured. They are usually used in facial cleansers and cosmetics, or in air blasting technology. In some cases, their use in medicine as vectors for drugs was reported. Microplastic "scrubbers", used in exfoliating hand cleansers and facial scrubs, have replaced traditionally used natural ingredients, including ground almond shells, oatmeal, and pumice. Primary microplastics have also been produced for use in air-blasting technology. This process involves blasting acrylic, melamine, or polyester microplastic scrubbers at machinery, engines, and boat hulls to remove rust and paint. As these scrubbers are used repeatedly until they diminish in size and their cutting power is lost, they often become contaminated with heavy metals such as cadmium, chromium, and lead. Although many companies have committed to reducing the production of microbeads, there are still many bioplastic microbeads that also have a long degradation life cycle, for example in cosmetics.

=== Secondary microplastics ===
Secondary microplastics are small pieces of plastic derived from the physical breakdown and mechanical degradation of larger plastic debris, both at sea and on land. Over time, a combination of physical, biological, and photochemical degradation, including photo-oxidation caused by sunlight exposure, can reduce the structural integrity of plastic debris to a size that is eventually undetectable to the naked eye. This process of breaking down large plastic material into much smaller pieces is known as fragmentation. It is considered that microplastics might further degrade to be smaller in size, although the smallest microplastic reportedly detected in the oceans in 2017 was 1.6 micrometres (6.3×10^{−5} in) in diameter. The prevalence of microplastics with uneven shapes suggests that fragmentation is a key source. One study suggested that more microplastics might be formed from biodegradable polymer than from non-biodegradable polymer in both seawater and fresh water.

Microplastic fibers enter the environment as a by-product during wear and tear and from the washing of synthetic clothing. Tires, composed partly of synthetic styrene-butadiene rubber, erode into tiny plastic and rubber particles as they are used and become dust particles. 2–5 mm plastic pellets, used to create other plastic products, enter ecosystems due to spillages and other accidents.

A 2015 Norwegian Environment Agency review report about microplastics stated it would be beneficial to classify these sources as primary, as long as microplastics from these sources are added from human society since the "start of the pipe", and their emissions are inherently a result of human material and product use and not secondary to fragmentation in the nature.

=== Nanoplastics ===
Depending on the definition used, nanoplastics are less than 1 μm (i.e. 1000 nm) or less than 100 nm in size. Speculations over nanoplastics in the environment range from it being a temporary byproduct during the fragmentation of microplastics to it being an invisible environmental threat at potentially high and continuously rising concentrations. The presence of nanoplastics in the North Atlantic Subtropical Gyre has been confirmed. Recent developments in Raman spectroscopy coupled with optical tweezers (Raman Tweezers) as well as nano-fourier-transform infrared spectroscopy (nano-FTIR), atomic force infrared (AFM-IR), and dynamic light scattering (DLS) are promising answers in the near future regarding the nanoplastic quantity in the environment. Fluorescence could represent a unique tool for the identification and quantification of nanoplastics, since it allows the development of fast, easy, cheap, and sensitive methods. A microfluidics method is also developed to aggregate nanoplastics into larger aggregates for convenient isolation, enrichment and downstream quantification via fluorescence microscopy of Nile-Red stained nanoplastics aggregates. However, the nanoplastic problem is complex and nanoscale properties as well as interaction with biomolecules need to be explored at the fundamental level with high spatial and temporal resolution.

Nanoplastics are thought to be a risk to environmental and human health. Due to their small size, nanoplastics can cross cellular membranes and affect the functioning of cells. Nanoplastics are lipophilic and models show that polyethylene nanoplastics can be incorporated into the hydrophobic core of lipid bilayers. Nanoplastics are also shown to cross the epithelial membrane of fish accumulating in various organs including the gallbladder, pancreas, and the brain. Nanoplastics are believed to cause interruptions in bone cell activities, causing improper bone formation. Little is known on adverse health effects of nanoplastics in organisms including humans. In zebrafish (Danio rerio), polystyrene nanoplastics can induce a stress response pathway altering glucose and cortisol levels, which is potentially tied to behavioral changes in stress phases. In Daphnia, polystyrene nanoplastic can be ingested by the freshwater cladoceran Daphnia pulex and affect its growth and reproduction as well as induce stress defense, including the ROS production and MAPK-HIF-1/NF-κB-mediated antioxidant system. Nanoplastics can also adsorb toxic chemical pollutants, such as antibiotics, which enables selective association with antibiotic-resistant bacteria, resulting in the dissemination of nanoplastics and antibiotic-resistant bacteria by the bacterivorous nematode Caenorhabditis elegans across the soil.

== Sources of microplastics ==
The existence of microplastics in the environment is often established through aquatic studies. These include taking plankton samples, analyzing sandy and muddy sediments, observing vertebrate and invertebrate consumption, and evaluating chemical pollutant interactions.

Microplastic is also a type of airborne particulates and is found to prevail in air. A 2017 IUCN report identified microplastics as a major contributor to marine plastic pollution. Microplastics can adsorb heavy metals from seawater.

Microplastics can also enter terrestrial systems through multiple pathways, including the degradation of plastic mulching films, the application of compost and sewage sludge, as well as atmospheric deposition, surface runoff, and irrigation. Their distribution in soils is influenced by land use, agricultural practices, and environmental conditions.

Observations have shown that microplastics can also be detected in soils without direct plastic application, indicating the importance of diffuse input pathways and long-term accumulation.

=== Oral intake ===
Oral intake is the main pathway of human exposure to microplastics. Microplastics exist in daily necessities like drinking water, bottled water, seafood, salt, sugar, tea bags, milk, and so on.

In 2017, more than eight million tons of plastics entered the oceans, greater than 33 times as much as that of the total plastics accumulated in the oceans by 2015. One consequence of this is marine life consumption of microplastics. It is estimated that Europeans are exposed to about 11,000 particles/person/year of microplastics due to shellfish consumption.

Microplastics may enter drinking water sources in a number of ways: from surface runoff (e.g. after a rain event), to wastewater effluent (both treated and untreated), combined sewer overflows, industrial effluent, degraded plastic waste, and atmospheric deposition. Surface run-off and wastewater effluent are recognized as the two main sources, but better data are required to quantify the sources and associate them with more specific plastic waste streams. Plastic bottles and caps that are used in bottled water have been confirmed as sources of microplastics in drinking-water.

Microplastics may also have been widely distributed in soil, especially in agricultural systems. They (especially with negative charge) can get into the water transport system of plants, and then move to the roots, stems, leaves, and fruits. Once microplastics enter agricultural systems through sewage sludge, compost, and plastic mulching, they will cause food pollution, which may increase the risk of human exposure. A 2023 study found that microplastics can reduce soil fertility and crop yields by disrupting soil microbial communities and water retention capacity.

=== Clothing ===
Many synthetic fibers, such as polyester, nylon, acrylics, and spandex, can be shed from clothing and persist in the environment. Each garment in a load of laundry can shed more than 1900 fibers of microplastics, with fleeces releasing the highest percentage of fibers, over 170% more than other garments. For an average wash load of 6 kilograms (13 lb), over 700,000 fibers could be released per wash.

The amount of microfibers released during laundering can vary depending on the type of fabric, its construction, and the washing conditions. Factors such as water temperature, washing cycle intensity, and detergent use may influence how many fibers detach from synthetic clothing. Repeated washing can also affect microfiber shedding as garments experience wear over time. Understanding these factors is important for identifying ways to reduce microfiber pollution from household laundry.

Washing machine filters can reduce the amount of microfiber fibers that need to be treated by sewage treatment facilities.

These microfibers have been found to persist throughout the food chain from zooplankton to larger animals such as whales. The primary fiber that persists throughout the textile industry is polyester which is a cheap cotton alternative that can be easily manufactured. However, these types of fibers contribute greatly to the persistence of microplastics in terrestrial, aerial, and marine ecosystems. The process of washing clothes causes garments to lose an average of over 100 fibers per liter of water. This has been linked with health effects possibly caused by the release of monomers, dispersive dyes, mordants, and plasticizers from manufacturing. The occurrence of these types of fibers in households has been shown to represent 33% of all fibers in indoor environments.

Textile fibers have been studied in both indoor and outdoor environments to determine the average human exposure. The indoor concentration was found to be 1.0–60.0 fibers/m^{3}, whereas the outdoor concentration was much lower at 0.3–1.5 fibers/m^{3}. The deposition rate indoors was 1586–11,130 fibers per day/m^{3} which accumulates to around 190–670 fibers/mg of dust.

=== Containers and packaging ===
Plastic containers can shed microplastics and nanoparticles into foods and beverages.

==== Bottled water ====
In one study, 93% of the bottled water from 11 different brands were contaminated with an average of 325 microplastic particles per liter. Of the tested brands, Nestlé Pure Life and Gerolsteiner bottles contained the most microplastic with 930 and 807 microplastic particles per liter (MPP/L), respectively. San Pellegrino products showed the least quantity of microplastic densities. Compared to water from taps, water from plastic bottles contained twice as much microplastic. Another study published in 2024, capable of detecting nanoplastics found 240,000 fragments per liter: 10% between 5 mm and 1 μm and 90% under 1 μm in diameter.

Some of the contamination likely comes from the process of bottling and packaging the water, and possibly from filters used to purify the water.

==== Baby bottles ====
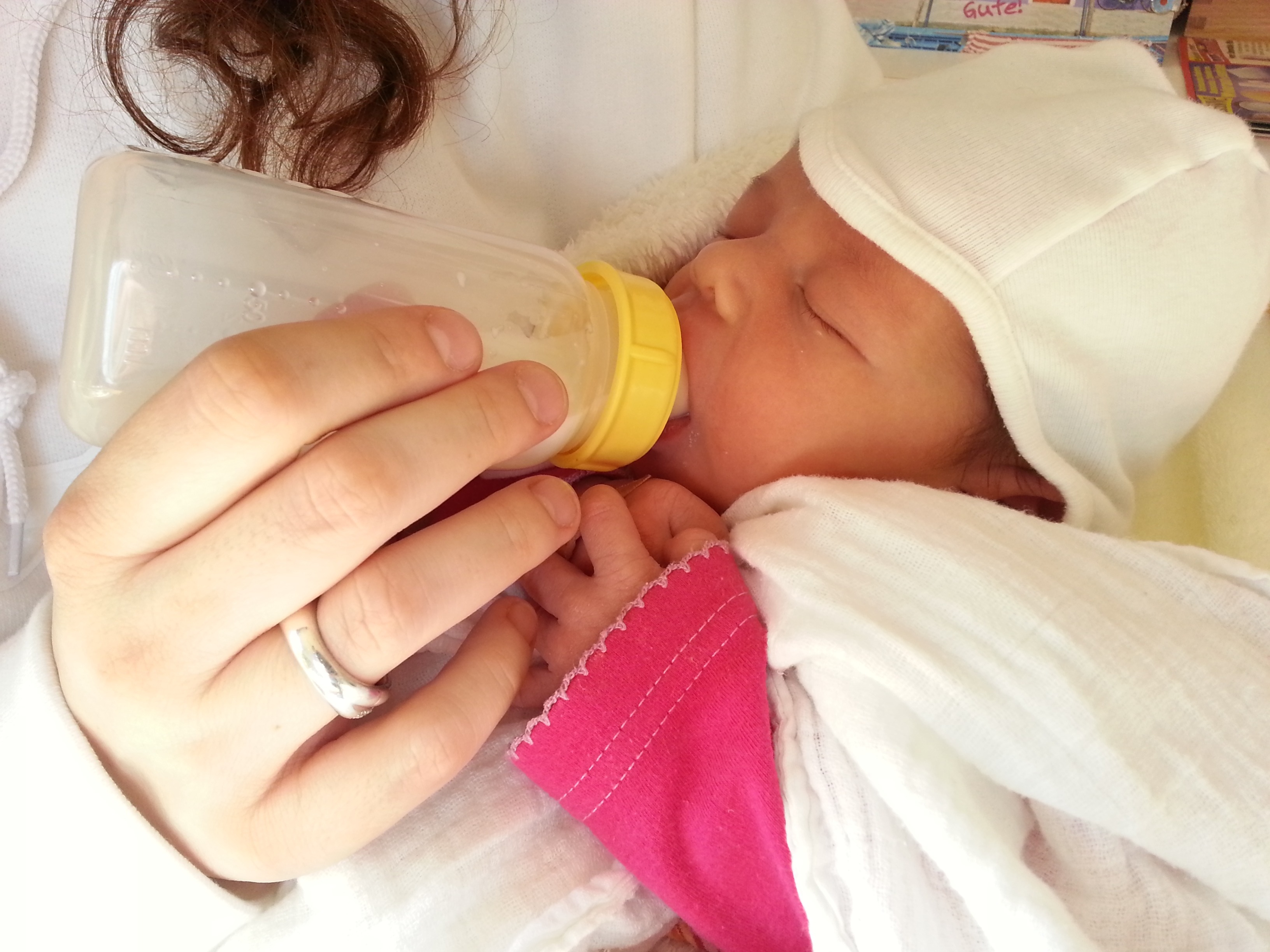
Newborn drinks milk from a baby bottle.

In 2020 researchers reported that polypropylene infant feeding bottles with contemporary preparation procedures were found to cause microplastics exposure to infants ranging from 14,600 to 4,550,000 particles per capita per day in 48 regions. Microplastics release is higher with warmer liquids and similar with other polypropylene products such as lunchboxes. Unexpectedly, silicone rubber baby bottle nipples degrade over time from repeated steam sterilization, shedding micro- and nano-sized particles of silicone rubber, researchers found in 2021. They estimated that, using such heat-degraded nipples for a year, a baby will ingest more than 660,000 particles.

==== Single-use plastic products ====
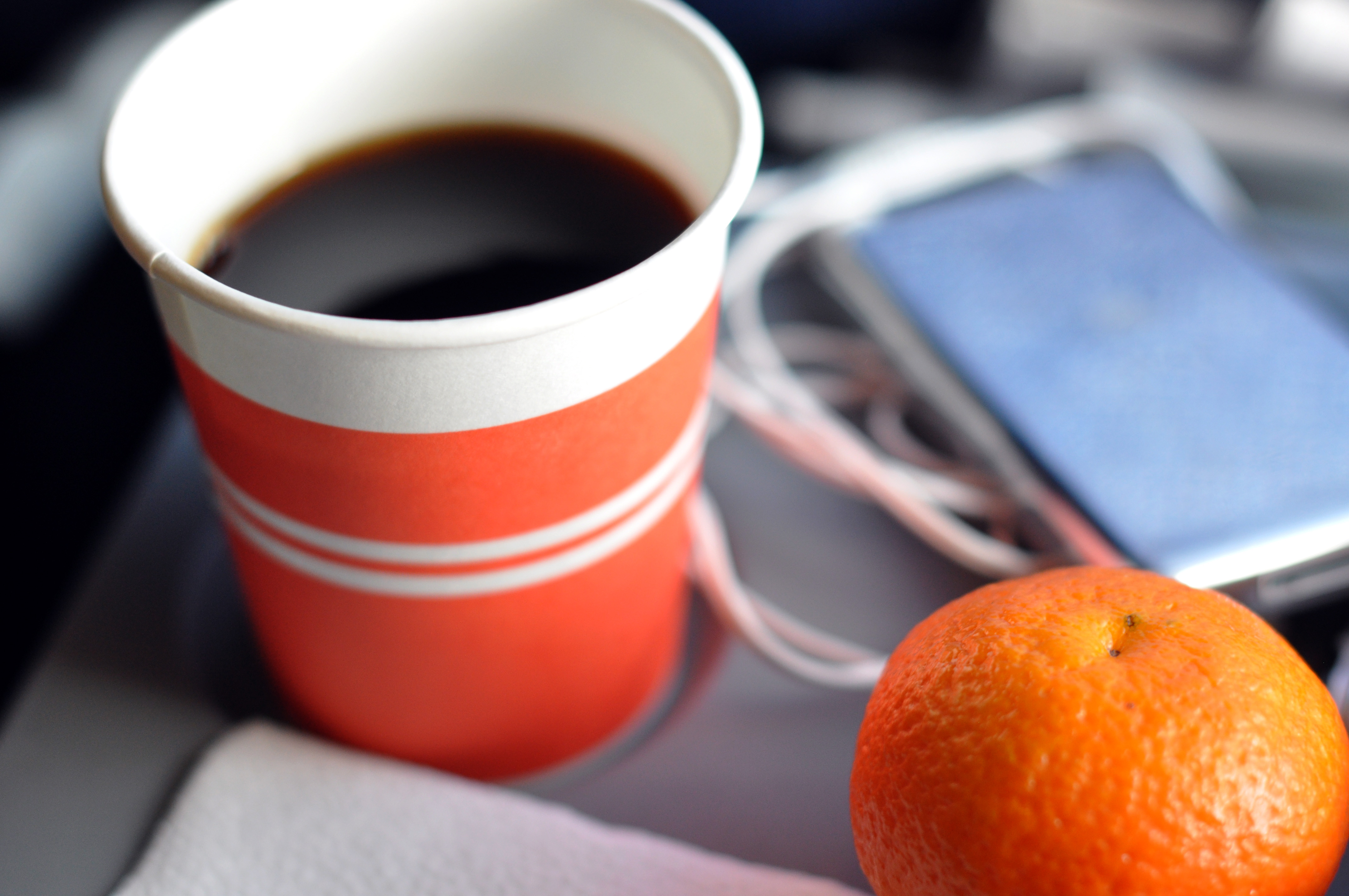
Conventional paper coffee cups, with internal plastic coating, release many nanoplastics into water.

Common single-use plastic products, such as plastic cups, or even paper coffee cups that are lined with a thin plastic film inside, release trillions of microplastic-nanoparticles per liter into water during normal use. Single-use plastic products enter aquatic environments and "[l]ocal and statewide policies that reduce single-use plastics were identified as effective legislative actions that communities can take to address plastic pollution".

=== Construction and renovation ===
Plastics are extensively used in the construction and renovation industry. Airborne microplastic dust is produced during renovation, building, bridge and road reconstruction projects.

Materials containing polyvinyl chloride (PVC), polycarbonate, polypropylene, and acrylic, can degrade overtime releasing microplastics. During the construction process single use plastic containers and wrappers are discarded adding to plastic waste. These plastics are difficult to recycle and end up in landfills where they break down over a long period of time causing potential leaching into the soil and the release of airborne microplastics. Airborne microplastic dust is also generated by deterioration of building materials.

Due to the environmental impact from plastic waste creation in the construction and renovation sectors waste management practices that address this issue are required. Although many researchers have investigated the use of wastes, such as plastic, in the construction process in an effort to reduce waste and increase sustainability, construction is not an environmentally-friendly activity by nature. Efforts have been made to reduce plastic waste by adding it to concrete as agglomerates. However, one solution for resolving the problem from the large amount of plastic wastes generated could bring another serious problem of leaching of microplastics. The unknown part of this area is huge and needs prompt investigation.

Around twenty percent of all plastics and seventy percent of all polyvinyl chloride (PVC) produced in the world each year are used by the construction industry. It is predicted that much more will be produced and used in the future. "In Europe, approximately 20% of all plastics produced are used in the construction sector including different classes of plastics, waste and nanomaterials."

Common types:

- Polyvinyl chloride (PVC)
- Polyethylene (PE)
- Polypropylene (PP)
- Expandable polystyrene (EPS)
- Polyurethane (PU)

Indirect use (packaging of construction materials) examples:

- Foils and moisture barriers
- Covers
- Soft plastic wraps
- EPS and PP sacks

Direct use (construction materials containing plastics) examples:

- Building products
  - Insulation
  - Damp-proofing
  - Flooring
  - Roofing
  - Windows
  - Laminated surfaces
- Building service installations
  - Pipes
  - Cabling
- Surface treatments
  - Paints
  - Varnishes
  - Sealants
  - Glues
  - Resins
- Covers
  - Shrink wrap
- Tarpaulins

=== Cosmetics industry ===
Some companies have replaced natural exfoliating ingredients with microplastics, usually in the form of "microbeads" or "micro-exfoliates". These products are typically composed of polyethylene, a common component of plastics, but they can also be manufactured from polypropylene, polyethylene terephthalate (PET), and nylon. They are often found in face washes, hand soaps, and other personal care products; the beads are usually washed into the sewage system immediately after use. Their small size prevents them from fully being retained by preliminary treatment screens at wastewater plants, thereby allowing some to enter rivers and oceans. Wastewater treatment plants only remove an average of 95–99.9% of microbeads because of their small design. This leaves an average of 0–7 microbeads per litre being discharged. Considering that the treatment plants of the world discharge 160 trillion liters of water per day, around 8 trillion microbeads are released into waterways every day. This number does not account for the sewage sludge that is reused as fertilizer after the waste water treatment that has been known to still contain these microbeads.

Although many companies have committed to phasing out the use of microbeads in their products, there are at least 80 different facial scrub products that are still being sold with microbeads as a main component. This contributes to the 80 metric tons of microbead discharge per year by the United Kingdom alone, which not only has a negative impact upon the wildlife and food chain, but also upon levels of toxicity, as microbeads have been proven to absorb dangerous chemicals such as pesticides and polycyclic aromatic hydrocarbons. The restriction proposal by the European Chemicals Agency (ECHA) and reports by the United Nations Environment Programme (UNEP) and TAUW suggest that there are more than 500 microplastic ingredients that are widely used in cosmetics and personal care products.

Even when microbeads are removed from cosmetic products, there are still harmful products being sold with plastics in them. For example, acrylate copolymers cause toxic effects for waterways and animals if they are polluted. Acrylate copolymers also can emit styrene monomers when used in body products which increases a person's chances of cancer. Countries like New Zealand which have banned microbeads often pass over other polymers such as acrylate copolymers, which can be just as toxic to people and the environment.

After the Microbead-Free Waters Act of 2015, the use of microbeads in toothpaste and other rinse-off cosmetic products has been discontinued in the US, however since 2015 many industries have instead shifted toward using FDA-approved "rinse-off" metallized-plastic glitter as their primary abrasive agent.

Recent research has explored sustainable alternatives to synthetic microplastics in cosmetic formulations. Natural polymers such as starch, cellulose, alginate, lignin, and pectin can be formulated as micro-particles and may serve functions such as stabilization and texture modification in skincare, haircare, and makeup products.

=== Fishing industry ===
Recreational and commercial fishing, marine vessels, and marine industries are all sources of plastic that can directly enter the marine environment, posing a risk to biota both as macroplastics, and as secondary microplastics following long-term degradation. Marine debris observed on beaches also arises from beaching of materials carried on inshore and ocean currents. Fishing gear is a form of plastic debris with a marine source. Discarded or lost fishing gear, including plastic monofilament line and nylon netting (sometimes called ghost nets), is typically neutrally buoyant and can, therefore, drift at variable depths within the oceans. Various countries have reported that microplastics from the industry and other sources have been accumulating in different types of seafood. In Indonesia, 55% of all fish species had evidence of manufactured debris similar to America which reported 67%. However, the majority of debris in Indonesia was plastic, while in North America the majority was synthetic fibers found in clothing and some types of nets. The implication from the fact that fish are being contaminated with microplastic is that those plastics and their chemicals will bioaccumulate in the food chain.

One study analyzed the plastic-derived chemical called polybrominated diphenyl ethers (PBDEs) in the stomachs of short-tailed shearwaters. It found that one-fourth of the birds had higher-brominated congeners that are not naturally found in their prey. However, the PBDE got into the birds' systems through plastic that was found in the stomachs of the birds. It is therefore not just the plastics that are being transferred through the food chain but the chemicals from the plastics as well.

=== Manufacturing ===
The manufacture of plastic products uses granules and small resin pellets as their raw material. In the United States, production increased from 2.9 million pellets in 1960 to 21.7 million pellets in 1987. In 2019, plastic world production was 368 million tonnes; 51% were produced in Asia. China, the world's largest producer, created 31% of the world total. Through accidental spillage during land or sea transport, inappropriate use as packing materials, and direct outflow from processing plants, these raw materials can enter aquatic ecosystems. In an assessment of Swedish waters using an 80 μm mesh, KIMO Sweden found typical microplastic concentrations of 150–2,400 microplastics per m^{3}; in a harbor adjacent to a plastic production facility, the concentration was 102,000 per m^{3}.

Many industrial sites in which convenient raw plastics are frequently used are located near bodies of water. If spilled during production, these materials may enter the surrounding environment, polluting waterways. "More recently, Operation Cleansweep, a joint initiative of the American Chemistry Council and Society of the Plastics Industry, is aiming for industries to commit to zero pellet loss during their operations". Overall, there is a significant lack of research aimed at specific industries and companies that contribute to microplastics pollution.

=== Personal protective equipment ===
Since the emergence of the COVID-19 pandemic, the usage of medical face masks has sharply increased. Single use face masks are made from polymers, such as polypropylene, polyurethane, polyacrylonitrile, polystyrene, polycarbonate, polyethylene, or polyester. The increase in production, consumption, and littering of face masks has been added to the list of environmental challenges, due to the addition of plastic particle waste to the environment. After degrading, disposable face masks can break down into smaller size particles (under 5mm), creating a prolific source of microplastic. A single surgical weathered face mask can release up to 173,000 fibers/ day.

A report made in February 2020 by Oceans Asia, an organization committed to advocacy and research on marine pollution, confirms "the presence of face masks of different types and colors in an ocean in Hong Kong".

=== Sewage treatment plants ===
Sewage treatment plants, also known as wastewater treatment plants (WWTPs), remove contaminants from wastewater, primarily from household sewage, using various physical, chemical, and biological processes. Most plants in developed countries have both primary and secondary treatment stages, and some provide a tertiary stage. In the primary stage of treatment, physical processes are employed to remove oils, sand, and other large solids using conventional filters, clarifiers, and settling tanks. Secondary treatment uses biological processes involving bacteria and protozoa to break down organic matter. Common secondary technologies are activated sludge systems, trickling filters, and constructed wetlands. The optional tertiary treatment stage may include processes for nutrient removal (nitrogen and phosphorus) and disinfection.

Microplastics have been detected in both the primary and secondary treatment stages of the plants. A groundbreaking 1998 study suggested that microplastic fibers would be a persistent indicator of sewage sludges and wastewater treatment plant outfalls. A study estimated that about one particle per liter of microplastics are being released back into the environment, with a removal efficiency of about 99.9%. A 2016 study showed that most microplastics are actually removed during the primary treatment stage where solid skimming and sludge settling are used. When these treatment facilities are functioning properly, the contribution of microplastics into oceans and surface water environments from WWTPs is not disproportionately large. Many studies show that while wastewater treatment plants certainly reduce the microplastic load on waterways, with current technological developments they are not able to clean the waters fully of this pollutant.

Sewage sludge is used for soil fertilizer in some countries, which exposes plastics in the sludge to the weather, sunlight, and other biological factors, causing fragmentation. As a result, microplastics from these biosolids often end up in storm drains and eventually into bodies of water. In addition, some studies show that microplastics do pass through filtration processes at some WWTPs. According to a study from the UK, samples taken from sewage sludge disposal sites on the coasts of six continents contained an average one particle of microplastic per liter. A significant amount of these particles was of clothing fibers from washing machine effluent.

=== Plastic production industry and recycling plants ===
Plastic producing and recycling industry as a point source of microplastic pollution has been investigated less frequently but was shown to contribute substantial amounts of small plastic particles to the environment: A study in Austria showed that a plastic plant released between 50 and 200 kg of primary microplastics during heavy rainfall, and a study conducted in Sweden showed a runoff of pellets through industrial wastewater of tens of thousands particles per day. Investigating a recycling plant in the UK, it was estimated that tons of microplastics were released into the environment.

=== Transportation ===
==== Car and truck tires ====
Wear and tear from tires significantly contributes to the flow of (micro-)plastics into the environment. Estimates of emissions of microplastics to the environment in Denmark are between 5,500 and 14,000 tonnes (6,100 and 15,400 tons) per year. Secondary microplastics (e.g. from car and truck tires or footwear) are more important than primary microplastics by two orders of magnitude. The formation of microplastics from the degradation of larger plastics in the environment is not accounted for in the study.

The estimated per capita emission ranges from 0.23 to 4.7 kg/year, with a global average of 0.81 kg/year. The emissions from car tires (wear reaching 100%) are substantially higher than those of other sources of microplastics, e.g., airplane tires (2%), artificial turf (wear 12–50%), brakes (wear 8%), and road markings (wear 5%). In the case of road markings, recent field study indicated that they were protected by a layer of glass beads and their contribution was only between 0.1 and 4.3 g/person/year, which would constitute approximately 0.7% of all of the secondary microplastics emissions; this value agrees with some emissions estimates. Emissions and pathways depend on local factors like road type or sewage systems. The relative contribution of tire wear and tear to the total global amount of plastics ending up in our oceans is estimated to be 5–10%. In air, 3–7% of the particulate matter (PM_{2.5}) is estimated to consist of tire wear and tear, indicating that it may contribute to the global health burden of air pollution which has been projected by the World Health Organization at 3 million deaths in 2012. Pollution from tire wear and tear also enters the food chain, but further research is needed to assess human health risks.

==== Shipping ====
Shipping has significantly contributed to marine pollution. Some statistics indicate that in 1970, commercial shipping fleets around the world dumped over 23,000 tons of plastic waste into the marine environment. In 1988, an international agreement (MARPOL 73/78, Annex V) prohibited the dumping of waste from ships into the marine environment. In the United States, the Marine Plastic Pollution Research and Control Act of 1987 prohibits discharge of plastics in the sea, including from naval vessels. However, shipping remains a dominant source of plastic pollution, having contributed around 6.5 million tons of plastic in the early 1990s. Research has shown that approximately 10% of the plastic found on the beaches in Hawaii are nurdles. In one incident on 24 July 2012, 150 tonnes of nurdles and other raw plastic material spilled from a shipping vessel off the coast near Hong Kong after a major storm. This waste from the Chinese company Sinopec was reported to have piled up in large quantities on beaches. While this is a large incident of spillage, researchers speculate that smaller accidents also occur and further contribute to marine microplastic pollution.

== Exposure pathways ==
=== Air ===
Airborne microplastics have been detected in the atmosphere, as well as indoors and outdoors. Microplastic can be atmospherically transported to remote areas by the wind. A 2017 study found indoor airborne microfiber concentrations between 1.0 and 60.0 microfibers per cubic meter (33% of which were found to be microplastics). Another study looked at microplastic in the street dust of Tehran and found 2,649 particles of microplastic within 10 samples of street dust, with ranging samples concentrations from 83 particle – 605 particles (±10) per 30.0 g of street dust. Microplastics and microfibers were also found in snow samples, and high up in "clean" air in high mountains at vast distances from their source. Much like freshwater ecosystems and soil, more studies are needed to understand the full impact and significance of airborne microplastics.

=== Water ===
==== Oceans ====
A growing concern regarding plastic pollution in the marine ecosystem is the use of microplastics. Microplastics are beads of plastic less than 5 millimeters wide, and they are commonly found in hand soaps, face cleansers, and other exfoliators. When these products are used, the microplastics go through the water filtration system and into the ocean, but because of their small size they are likely to escape capture by the preliminary treatment screens on wastewater plants. These beads are harmful to the organisms in the ocean, especially filter feeders, because they can easily ingest the plastic and become sick. The microplastics are such a concern because it is difficult to clean them up due to their size, so humans can try to avoid using these harmful plastics by purchasing products that use environmentally safe exfoliates.

==== Ice cores ====
Plastic pollution has previously been recorded in Antarctic surface waters and sediments as well as in the Arctic sea ice, but in 2009, for the first time, plastic was found in Antarctic sea ice, with 96 microplastic particles from 14 different types of polymers in an ice core sampled from east Antarctica. Relatively large particle sizes in Antarctic sea ice suggest local pollution sources.

==== Freshwater ====
Microplastics have been widely detected in the world's aquatic environments. The first study on microplastics in freshwater ecosystems was published in 2011 that found an average of 37.8 fragments per square meter of Lake Huron sediment samples. Additionally, studies have found MP (microplastic) to be present in all of the Great Lakes with an average concentration of 43,000 MP particle km^{−2}. Microplastics have also been detected in freshwater ecosystems outside of the United States, for example in 2019 study conducted in Poland showed that microplastic was present in all 30 studied lakes of the Masurian Lakeland with density from 0.27 to 1.57 particles per liter. In Canada, a three-year study found a mean microplastic concentration of 193,420 particles km^{−2} in Lake Winnipeg. None of the microplastics detected were micro-pellets or beads and most were fibers resulting from the breakdown of larger particles, synthetic textiles, or atmospheric fallout. The highest concentration of microplastic ever discovered in a studied freshwater ecosystem was recorded in the Rhine river at 4000 MP particles kg^{−1}.

==== Watersheds ====
Researchers from Western Carolina University, Highlands Biological Station, and Virginia Tech found microplastics in Richland Creek watershed in Western North Carolina. 90% of the microplastics were fibers, largely attributed to clothing, city runoff, and atmospheric deposition.

=== Soil ===
A substantial portion of microplastics are expected to end up in the world's soil, yet very little research has been conducted on microplastics in soil outside of aquatic environments. In wetland environments microplastic concentrations have been found to exhibit a negative correlation with vegetation cover and stem density. There exists some speculation that fibrous secondary microplastics from washing machines could end up in soil through the failure of water treatment plants to completely filter out all of the microplastic fibers. Furthermore, geophagous soil fauna, such as earthworms, mites, and collembolans could contribute to the amount of secondary microplastic present in soil by converting consumed plastic debris into microplastic via digestive processes. Further research, however, is needed. There is concrete data linking the use of organic waste materials to synthetic fibers being found in the soil; but most studies on plastics in soil merely report its presence and do not mention origin or quantity. Controlled studies on fiber-containing land-applied wastewater sludges (biosolids) applied to soil reported semiquantitative recoveries of the fibers a number of years after application.

=== Salt and seafood ===
A 2015 review of 15 brands of table salts commercially available in China found microplastics were much more prevalent in sea salts compared to lake, rock, or well salts, attributing this to sea salts being contaminated by ocean water pollution while the rock/well salts were more likely contaminated during the production stages of collecting, wind drying, and packaging. According to a 2017 estimate, a person who consumes seafood will ingest 11,000 bits of microplastics per year. A 2019 study found a kilo of sugar had 440 microplastic particles, a kilo of salt contained 110 particles, and a litre of bottled water contained 94 particles.

== Composition ==
The composition of microplastics are complex. A study in 2023 tested some fish species and found that "about 80% of the MPs detected were fibrous in shape and were made of polyethylene (25%), polyester (20%), and polyamide (10%). Most microplastic particles observed were black (61%) or blue (27%) in color."

Microplastics contain two different types of chemicals. The first are additives and polymeric raw materials such as monomers or oligomers. Additives are chemicals intentionally added during plastic production to give plastic qualities like color and transparency and to enhance the performance of plastic products to improve both the resistance to degradation by ozone, temperature, light radiation, mold, bacteria and humidity, and mechanical, thermal and electrical resistance. Examples of additives in microplastics are inert or reinforcing fillers, plasticizers, antioxidants, UV stabilizers, lubricants, dyes and flame-retardants The second type of chemicals are ones absorbed from the surrounding environment.

== Effects on the environment ==
In 2008, an International Research Workshop at the University of Washington at Tacoma concluded that microplastics were a problem in the marine environment, based on their documented occurrence, the long residence times of these particles, their likely buildup in the future, and their demonstrated ingestion by marine organisms.

According to a comprehensive review of scientific evidence published by the European Union's Scientific Advice Mechanism in 2019, microplastics were present in every part of the environment. While there was no evidence of widespread ecological risk from microplastic pollution yet, risks were likely to become widespread within a century if pollution continued at its current rate.

As of 2020, microplastics had been detected in freshwater systems including marshes, streams, ponds, lakes, and rivers in Europe, North America, South America, Asia, and Australia. Samples collected across 29 Great Lakes tributaries from six states in the United States were found to contain plastic particles, 98% of which were microplastics ranging in size from 0.355mm to 4.75mm. Likewise, they have been found in high mountains, at great distances from their source.

Deep layer ocean sediment surveys in China (2020) show the presence of plastics in deposition layers far older than the invention of plastics, leading to suspected underestimation of microplastics in surface sample ocean surveys.

In September 2021 Hurricane Larry deposited, during the storm peak, 113,000 particles/m^{2}/day as it passed over Newfoundland, Canada. Back-trajectory modelling and polymer type analysis indicated that those microplastics may have been ocean-sourced as the hurricane traversed the North Atlantic garbage patch of the North Atlantic Gyre.

A 2025 study in China confirmed a similar phenomenon of typhoon-driven microplastic transport. Research on Typhoon Gaemi found it deposited up to 12,722 microplastic particles per square meter per day in Ningbo, with a peak rate 54 times higher than typical levels in Beijing. The study demonstrated that typhoons effectively vacuum microplastics from the ocean depth and eject them into the atmosphere via sea spray, acting as a major vector for landward microplastic pollution.

As of 2023, there was rapid growth of microplastic pollution research, with marine and estuarine environments most frequently studied. Researchers have called for better sharing of research data that might lead to effective solutions.

A 2023 study formally identified plasticosis as a fibrotic disease caused by plastic ingestion, distinguishing it from general physical damage by detailing the chronic tissue remodeling and inflammation it induces in seabird digestive systems.

Consequences of plastic degradation and pollution release over long term have mostly been overlooked. The large amounts of plastic in the environment, exposed to degradation, with years of decay and release of toxic compounds to follow was referred to as toxicity debt.

=== Marine and freshwater organisms ===
Microplastics are inconspicuous, being less than 5 mm. Particles of this size are available to every species, enter the food chain at the bottom, and become embedded in animal tissue.

Micro- and nanoplastics can become embedded in animals' tissue through ingestion or respiration. The initial demonstration of bioaccumulation of these particles in animals was conducted under controlled conditions by exposing them to high concentrations of microplastics over extended periods, accumulating these particles in their gut and gills due to ingestion and respiration, respectively. Various annelid species, such as deposit-feeding lugworms (Arenicola marina), have been shown to accumulate microplastics embedded in their gastrointestinal tract. Similarly, many crustaceans, like the shore crab, Carcinus maenas, have been seen to integrate microplastics into both their respiratory and digestive tracts. Plastic particles are often mistaken by fish for food, which can block their digestive tracts, sending incorrect feeding signals to the brains of the animals. However, research in 2021 revealed that fish ingest microplastics inadvertently rather than intentionally. The first occurrence of bioaccumulation of micro and nanoplastics in wild animals was documented in the skin mucosa of salmon, and it was attributed to the resemblance between nanoplastics and the outer shell of the viruses that the mucosa traps. This discovery was entirely serendipitous, as the research team had developed a detailed molecular separation process for the components of fish skin with the primary objective of isolating chitin from a vertebrate for the first time.

A study done at the Argentinean coastline of the Rio de la Plata estuary, found the presence of microplastics in the guts of 11 species of coastal freshwater fish. These 11 species of fish represented four different feeding habits: detritivore, planktivore, omnivore and ichthyophagous. This study is one of the few so far to show the ingestion of microplastics by freshwater organisms.

It can take up to 14 days for microplastics to pass through an animal (as compared to a normal digestion period of 2 days), but enmeshment of the particles in animals' gills can prevent elimination entirely. When microplastic-laden animals are consumed by predators, the microplastics are then incorporated into the bodies of higher trophic-level feeders. For example, scientists have reported plastic accumulation in the stomachs of lantern fish which are small filter feeders and are the main prey for commercial fish like tuna and swordfish. Microplastics also absorb chemical pollutants that can be transferred into the organism's tissues. Small animals are at risk of reduced food intake due to false satiation and resulting starvation or other physical harm from the microplastics.

Zooplankton ingest microplastics beads (1.7–30.6 μm) and excrete fecal matter contaminated with microplastics. Along with ingestion, the microplastics stick to the appendages and exoskeleton of the zooplankton. Zooplankton, among other marine organisms, consume microplastics because they emit similar infochemicals, notably dimethyl sulfide, just as phytoplankton do. Plastics such as high-density polyethylene (HDPE), low-density polyethylene (LDPE), and polypropylene (PP) produce dimethyl sulfide odors. These types of plastics are commonly found in plastic bags, food storage containers, and bottle caps. Green and red filaments of plastics are found in the planktonic organisms and in seaweeds.

Bottom feeders, such as benthic sea cucumbers, who are non-selective scavengers that feed on debris on the ocean floor, ingest large amounts of sediment. It has been shown that four species of sea cucumber (Thyonella gemmate, Holothuria floridana, H. grisea and Cucumaria frondosa) ingested between 2- and 20-fold more PVC fragments and between 2- and 138-fold more nylon line fragments (as much as 517 fibers per organism) based on plastic-to-sand grain ratios from each sediment treatment. These results suggest that individuals may be selectively ingesting plastic particles. This contradicts the accepted indiscriminate feeding strategy of sea cucumbers, and may occur in all presumed non-selective feeders when presented with microplastics.

The larvae of caddisflies (Trichoptera), freshwater insects that build protective cases, now also include microplastic particles into their builds. In 2023, caddisfly cases were rediscovered in the natural history collection of the Naturalis Biodiversity Center, which were collected in 1971 and 1986, yet already contained microplastics. This discovery predates the coining of the term microplastic in 2004, as well as the initiation of microplastic research in freshwater environments. These historical specimens thus provide a unique opportunity to retrospectively study the occurrence and impact of microplastics in aquatic ecosystems. A recent 2025 study revealed that in certain streams, over half of all caddisfly cases incorporated artificial materials.

Bivalves, important aquatic filter feeders, have also been shown to ingest microplastics and nanoplastics. Upon exposure to microplastics, bivalve filtration ability decreases. Multiple cascading effects occur as a result, such as immunotoxicity and neurotoxicity. Decreased immune function occurs due to reduced phagocytosis and NF-κB gene activity. Impaired neurological function is a result of the inhibition of ChE and suppression of neurotransmitter regulatory enzymes. When exposed to microplastics, bivalves also experience oxidative stress, indicating an impaired ability to detoxify compounds within the body, which can ultimately damage DNA. Bivalve gametes and larvae are also impaired when exposed to microplastics. Rates of developmental arrest, and developmental malformities increase, while rates of fertilization decrease. When bivalves have been exposed to microplastics as well as other pollutants such as POPs, mercury or hydrocarbons in lab settings, toxic effects were shown to be aggravated.

Not only fish and free-living organisms can ingest microplastics. Some corals such as Pocillopora verrucosa have also been found to ingest microplastics. Scleractinian corals, which are primary reef-builders, have been shown to ingest microplastics under laboratory conditions. Researchers from Japan and Thailand investigating microplastics in coral have found that all three parts of the coral anatomy (surface mucus, tissue, and skeleton) contain microplastics. According to recent study, mall-polyp corals (P. cf. damicornis and P. lutea) demonstrated a higher degree of MP accumulation than the large-polyp corals. The interplay of precipitation, wind patterns, and ocean currents considerably influences MP abundance in corals by increasing the exposure of corals to elevated MP concentrations. Additionally, since the reef site was situated near a large rock formation, it experienced strong water movements due to constant wave action. MPs deposited in skeletons are likely to be preserved on a millennium timescale, even if the corals die. Thus, given the extensive presence of coral reefs worldwide, corals can accumulate a considerable number of MPs, thereby acting as a sink for ocean plastics.

While the effects of ingestion on these corals has not been studied, corals can easily become stressed and bleach. Microplastics have been shown to stick to the exterior of the corals after exposure in the laboratory. The adherence to the outside of corals can potentially be harmful, because corals cannot handle sediment or any particulate matter on their exterior and slough it off by secreting mucus, expending energy in the process, increasing the likelihood of mortality. The thermodynamic properties, development, and nutrition of corals are thought to be negatively impacted by the engaged consumption and detached exterior bond strength of MPs. This could result in decreased feed intake, decreased photosynthetic efficiency, altered metabolic rates, decreased bone calcification, and even skin chlorination and necrotizing.

Marine biologists in 2017 discovered that three-quarters of the underwater seagrass in the Turneffe Atoll off the coast of Belize had microplastic fibers, shards, and beads stuck to it. The plastic pieces had been overgrown by epibionts (organisms that naturally stick themselves to seagrass). Seagrass is part of the barrier reef ecosystem and is fed on by parrotfish, which in turn are eaten by humans. These findings, published in Marine Pollution Bulletin, may be "the first discovery of microplastics on aquatic vascular plants... [and] only the second discovery of microplastics on marine plant life anywhere in the world." Experimental flume studies have also shown that seagrass canopies can retain microplastics, suggesting that vegetated coastal habitats may influence the transport and accumulation of microplastic particles. More recent studies have investigated whether microplastics can alter seagrass stress tolerance, sediment microbial communities, and the functioning of seagrass carbon sinks

Research published in 2023 demonstrated that microplastic exposure impaired the cognitive performance of hermit crabs, which could potentially impact their survivability.

=== Microbes, soil ecosystems and terrestrial plants ===
In agricultural soils, residues of plastic mulch films have been shown to affect wheat growth and biomass allocation. The impact of microplastics on plants can, in some aspects, be compared to their effects on microorganisms, as it strongly depends on the type of plastic. Some studies have shown that bioplastics may induce stronger effects than conventional plastics.

There is also evidence that microplastics can alter root and leaf traits, total biomass, and morphophysiological characteristics of plants. In well-watered soils, microplastics decrease fungal biodiversity, but in drought conditions, soils with microplastics host higher soil fungal biodiversity.

A 2024 meta-analysis of 180 studies found that microplastic exposure increased soil carbon dioxide emissions by 25.7%, while also increasing soil organic carbon content by 25.4%. The analysis also found a significant reduction in aboveground plant biomass, suggesting that microplastic pollution may affect agricultural productivity. These effects varied depending on microplastic type, particle size, concentration, and exposure duration.

Microbes also live on the surface of microplastics, and can form a biofilm which, according to a 2019 study, has a unique structure and possesses a special risk, because microplastic biofilms have been proven to provide a novel habitat for colonization that increases overlap between different species, thus spreading pathogens and antibiotic resistant genes through horizontal gene transfer. Then, due to rapid movement through waterways, these pathogens can be moved from their origin to another location where a specific pathogen may not be naturally present, spreading potential disease. There is concern microplastic pollutants may act as a vector for antibiotic resistant genes and bacteria. Clinically important bacterial genus like Eggerthella were more than three times enriched on riverine microplastics compared to water.

=== Animals ===
In 2019, the first European records of microplastic items in amphibians' stomach content was reported in specimens of the common European newt (Triturus carnifex). This also represented the first evidence for Caudata worldwide, highlighting that the emerging issue of plastics is a threat even in remote high-altitude environments. The microplastic has also been found in common blackbirds (Turdus merula) and song thrushes (Turdus philomelos) which shows a ubiquity of microplastics in terrestrial environments.

In 2023, plasticosis, a new disease caused solely by plastics, was discovered in seabirds who had scarred digestive tracts from ingesting plastic waste. "When birds ingest small pieces of plastic, [...]it inflames the digestive tract. Over time, the persistent inflammation causes tissues to become scarred and disfigured, affecting digestion, growth and survival."

=== Gastrointestinal effects ===
Microplastics can affect the gastrointestinal system of aquatic organisms, where they represent a primary site of interaction following ingestion. In fish such as Danio rerio, microplastic particles accumulate in the intestine and may induce biological responses including inflammation and alterations of the intestinal microbiome. Exposure to microplastics has been associated with shifts in microbial composition, including increases in Proteobacteria and decreases in Firmicutes and Bacteroidetes, which are linked to inflammatory responses and impaired intestinal function. Microplastic exposure has also been associated with histopathological alterations of the intestinal epithelium. Observed changes include damage to intestinal villi, increased mucus secretion, and disruption of epithelial structure, which may impair nutrient absorption and barrier function. In addition, microplastic exposure has been linked to increased intestinal permeability and alterations in tight junction integrity, further contributing to compromised barrier function and facilitating the translocation of harmful substances. Furthermore, microplastics can act as vectors for chemical contaminants. Due to their hydrophobic surfaces, particles such as polystyrene can adsorb persistent organic pollutants, including compounds such as DDT, phenanthrene, perfluorooctanoic acid (PFOA), and di-2-ethylhexyl phthalate (DEHP).

=== Persistent organic pollutants and emerging organic contaminants ===
Plastic particles may highly concentrate and transport synthetic organic compounds (e.g. persistent organic pollutants and emerging organic contaminants), commonly present in the environment and ambient seawater, on their surface through adsorption. Microplastics can act as carriers for the transfer of POPs from the environment to organisms, also termed as the Trojan Horse effect. Recent articles have also shown that microplastics can sorb emerging organic chemicals such as pharmaceuticals and personal care products. The sorption potential is affected by water matrix, pH, ionic strength and aging of microparticles.

Additives added to plastics during manufacture may leach out upon ingestion, potentially causing serious harm to the organism. Endocrine disruption by plastic additives may affect the reproductive health of humans and wildlife alike.

=== Geophysics ===
Microplastics exhibit distinct radiative properties that influence how they interact with solar and terrestrial radiation. Their absorption, scattering, and reflectance depend on polymer type as well as physical characteristics such as particle size, shape, surface roughness, and opacity. Experimental and modeling studies indicate that microplastics interact with radiation across the ultraviolet, visible, and near-infrared spectrum in a wavelength-dependent manner, with scattering generally dominating over absorption. Depending on their optical properties and environmental setting, microplastics may contribute to either cooling through enhanced scattering or warming through increased absorption of radiation.

Atmospheric microplastics can influence Earth's radiative balance by scattering solar radiation. Model simulations indicate that microplastics concentrated in the atmospheric boundary layer produce a small net negative radiative forcing at both the surface and the top of the atmosphere. The sign of this effect is strongly controlled by underlying surface albedo, with cooling favored over snow, ice, oceans, and forests, while intermediate-albedo surfaces such as grasslands and bare soil may experience weak warming. Owing to the large ocean surface area, the net global radiative effect was initially expected to be negative, though strongest regionally. This picture has however been challenged by a study published in May 2026 in Nature Climate Change, conducted by researchers from Fudan University and Duke University, which found that atmospheric micro and nanoplastics primarily absorb rather than scatter solar radiation, with a net warming effect estimated to be approximately 16% of that of black carbon. Particle color was identified as the dominant factor, with darker particles absorbing sunlight far more efficiently than white ones. The authors noted that current climate models do not yet incorporate this effect.

Microplastics may also influence cloud microphysical processes. While pristine microplastics are generally hydrophobic and inefficient as cloud condensation nuclei, atmospheric aging processes can increase their wettability and potentially enhance their ability to participate in cloud droplet formation. Based on their physicochemical properties, microplastics and nanoplastics have also been proposed as potential ice-nucleating particles.

Microplastics have been detected in snow and ice from remote cryospheric regions, including the Arctic, high mountain ranges, and Antarctica. Due to their light-absorbing properties, microplastics deposited on snow and ice surfaces may reduce surface albedo and enhance melting. Dark-colored microplastics, including particles derived from tire wear, absorb solar radiation in a manner comparable to black carbon and may further accelerate snowmelt. Albedo-driven melting can also release microplastics into downstream aquatic systems, potentially amplifying environmental impacts.

Floating microplastics may increase surface reflectivity and suppress turbulent mixing, potentially reducing heat uptake by aquatic systems. By altering the distribution of solar radiation, microplastics may affect both heat storage and biological activity in water bodies. Laboratory experiments indicate that microplastic particles can increase the stability and surface coverage of sea foam by accumulating at the air–water interface. Enhanced foam persistence may increase ocean surface albedo by reflecting a larger fraction of incoming solar radiation, although the magnitude of this effect remains uncertain. Microplastics in the ocean may re-enter the atmosphere via sea spray.

Microplastics are widespread in terrestrial soils through irrigation, plastic mulching, and atmospheric deposition. Experimental studies show that microplastics can reduce soil thermal conductivity and increase surface albedo, leading to lower soil heat uptake and altered temperature dynamics. By modifying heat exchange between land surfaces and the atmosphere, microplastics may influence soil microclimate conditions, with potential consequences for ecosystem processes.

A study published in May 2026 in Nature Climate Change, conducted by researchers from Fudan University and Duke University, provides the first global quantification of the radiative forcing of atmospheric micro- and nanoplastics. Using laboratory measurements and climate models, the authors found that airborne plastic particles — transported by winds across the globe — predominantly absorb solar radiation rather than reflecting it, thereby contributing to atmospheric warming. Particle color was identified as the dominant factor: black, yellow, blue, and red particles absorb sunlight far more efficiently than white ones. The estimated global warming effect of atmospheric microplastics corresponds to approximately 16% of that attributed to black carbon, one of the most significant known short-term warming agents. The authors note that current climate models do not yet account for this effect.

=== Measurement Methods ===
We can identify microplastics in drinking water by using infrared and Ramen spectroscopy, which help researches determine the type of plastic present in the water. The number, size, and shape of the particles is also included in this analysis. On the contrary, thermal analysis methods are used to measure the mass of different type of plastics but they do not produce details about individual particles. Studies tend to use different particle sizes so their findings can be difficult to compare.

Many different things can also influence the results, like contamination while things are being tested in the lab and samples are collected. Plastic particles can enter samples from the surrounding air, clothing, or equipment used during testing. To take this into consideration, researchers use blank samples, like participle-free water that goes through the same testing process. Guidelines for analyzing drinking water also recommend avoiding plastic equipment when testing and reporting the smallest particle size than can be detected.

== Human health ==
Although the impacts of microplastics on human health are still being tested, their possible effects can be studied through human absorption models of nanomaterials that are produced by various industrial production processes. Several in vitro and in vivo studies have shown that micro- and nanoplastics were able to cause serious impacts on the human body, including physical stress and damage, apoptosis, necrosis, inflammation, oxidative stress and immune responses. Microplastic pollution has been associated with various adverse human health conditions, including respiratory disease and inflammation, but it was not known whether this was a causative effect. Microplastics accumulate in the brain.

Microplastics often contain chemical additives like phthalates and bisphenol A (BPA), which are known endocrine-disrupting chemicals. Microplastics and their additives can disrupt the hypothalamic-pituitary-gonadal (HPG) axis, a critical regulator of male reproductive function.

A study from Harvard found that microplastics have been linked to "inflammation, cell death, lung and liver effects, changes in the gut microbiome, and altered lipid and hormone metabolism."

A number of studies have concluded that microplastics create inflammatory effects in the human body. An in vitro study found that ultrafine particles composed of low-toxicity material, such as polystyrene, have proinflammatory activity as a consequence of their large surface area. Another study found pro-inflammatory factors and debris in human joints from polyethylene components used as prostheses, for example knee and hip replacements.

In vitro studies have also shown that different polystyrene nanoparticles can induce oxidative stress, apoptosis and autophagic cell death in a context-dependent manner. Despite these toxic effects, no obvious severe toxicity was observed in liver, duodenum, ileum, jejunum, large intestine, testes, lungs, heart, spleen, and kidneys of mice following oral exposure of a mixture of microplastics.

A study published in Nature in October 2026 found that several common plastics could generate reactive oxygen species at their surfaces when in contact with water. In laboratory experiments, the researchers linked this chemical activity to protein aggregation and damage to mouse red blood cells. The findings suggest a possible mechanism through which microplastics could contribute to biological harm, although the extent to which these effects occur in humans remains unclear.

Recent studies have revealed that microplastics and nanoplastics can impair cellular metabolism in both in vitro and in vivo models. After exposure to negatively charged carboxylated polystyrene nanoparticles measuring 20 nm, basolateral K+ ion channels were found to be activated in human lung cells. The nanoplastic particles caused persistent and concentration-dependent increases in short-circuit currents by the activation of the ion channels and the stimulation of Cl− and HCO3− ion efflux. Furthermore, 30 nm polystyrene nanoparticles induced large vesicle-like structures in the endocytic route in macrophages and human cancer cell lines A549, HepG-2, and HCT116. As a result, vesicle transport and the distribution of proteins involved in cytokinesis are blocked, thus stimulating the formation of binucleated cells.

An article from Stanford Medicine reported that microplastics are widespread, and are invariably found in the human body. Even babies contain microplastics, from the placenta and breast milk. The brain, heart, and fluids such as urine have been found to have traces of microplastics and nano plastics. Early evidence suggests that these particles are harmful with animal and cellular studies, connecting them with inflammation, immune disruption, tissue damage, digestive issues, and respiratory health risks. A study from 2024 found that patients with microplastics in their arterial plaque were at a higher risk of heart attack, stroke, and death. Recently, studies have found that exposure to microplastics can alter gene expression, potentially leading to vascular disease and long-lasting conditions.

The results of several high-profile studies of microplastics in the human body have been contested. Fats in human tissue may be mistaken for plastic polyethylene and PVC plastics in certain tests for microplastics in human organs. Also, coatings on laboratory gloves can rub off during handling in tests and cause error in infrared light techniques used to scan for microplastics. The authors of the relevant study, however, point out that even a lower amount of plastics in human tissue is unacceptable, saying "there should be none."

Evaluating the health risks of inhaling microplastics is complicated because the particles being used in laboratory studies often differ from those found in the environment. The United Kingdom's Committee on the Medical Effects of Air Pollutants noted that many studies have tested newly manufactured polystyrene particles at concentrations much higher than those people would typically see in daily life. Microplastics are all different from one another in many ways including: shape, chemical composition, and the amount they have broken down over time. These differences make it difficult to determine how accurately laboratory findings reflect the true effects of everyday exposure. The committee ended up concluding that there was not enough evidence to assess the health risks of airborne microplastics, even though some studies involving people exposed to high levels of these particles have reported changes in their lung function.

== Prevention ==
=== Dust control ===
Some of the suggested dust control measures include "lining cutting areas with tarps, cutting inside a protective tent, and using vacuum bags on power tool" when cutting materials like Trex and Azek. The cost of these measures is low." Street sweeping may also inhibit the spread of pollutants by gathering significant amounts of dirty materials from the extensive construction, renovation and reconstruction projects of road tunnels, bridges, roads and buildings.

=== Treatment ===
Some researchers have proposed incinerating plastics to use as energy, which is known as energy recovery. As opposed to losing the energy from plastics into the atmosphere in landfills, this process turns some of the plastics back into energy that can be used. Incineration of plastics does not, however, result in their complete combustion. Research carried out in China in 2025 has found high levels of non-combusted, superheated microplastic in flue gas, averaging 2.1 trillion microplastics per annum per incinerator.. Incineration, as opposed to recycling, does not diminish the amount of plastic material that is produced. Therefore, recycling plastics is considered a more efficient solution.

Biodegradation is another possible solution to large amounts of microplastic waste. In this process, microorganisms consume and decompose synthetic polymers by means of enzymes. These plastics can then be used in the form of energy and as a source of carbon once broken down. The microbes could potentially be used to treat sewage wastewater, which would decrease the amount of microplastics that pass through into the surrounding environments.

=== Filtering ===
Efficient removal of microplastics via waste water treatment plants is critical to prevent the transfer of microplastics from society to natural water systems. The captured microplastics in the treatment plants become part of the sludge produced by the plants. The problem is that this sludge is often used as farm fertilizer meaning the plastics enter waterways through runoff.

=== Collection devices ===
The Ocean Cleanup, a Dutch foundation, has developed various proposals, with the stated aim of "clearing 90% of the ocean's microplastics". The project has been met with widespread criticism from oceanographers and plastic pollution experts, despite positive news articles. It has been dismissed by almost all microplastics experts as unlikely to have any impact on the microplastics issue. Some of the reasons for this are it only targets plastics larger than 2 cm (this is larger than the criteria for a microplastic), is infeasible from an engineering standpoint and likely to fail rapidly, and it only captures plastic from the top 3m of depth (most plastic circulates much deeper than this).

In addition, some bacteria have adapted to eat plastic, and some bacteria species have been genetically modified to eat (certain types of) plastics. Other than degrading microplastics, microbes had been engineered in a novel way to capture microplastics in their biofilm matrix from polluted samples for easier removal of such pollutants. The microplastics in the biofilms can then be released with an engineered 'release' mechanism via biofilm dispersal to facilitate with microplastics recovery.

Absorption devices include sponges made of cotton and squid bones, which may be scalable for water remediation projects.

=== Microplastics detection ===
Several methods are available to obtain microplastic samples from the environment, such as using nets or pumps in surface waters, and some methods are low-cost and appropriate for citizen scientists. or the recollection of beach sediments. Microplastics are difficult to detect due to their small sizes. Conventional methods include direct enumeration and measurement of sizes under light microscopy, and identification of microplastic polymer type via Raman microspectrometry. microbes were engineered to detect microplastics pollution via the activation of green fluorescent protein.

However, analytic methods for micro- and nanoplastic detection are not yet fully standardized. There are methodological limitations that influence concentrations during sampling and analysis. In water samples, mesh size correlates with detected size and shape of particles. By using larger mesh sizes, smaller particle sizes tend to be underestimated. This may lead to inaccurate representation of occurring environmental concentrations, imposing difficulties for risk and effect assessment. Differences in sample preparation and measuring techniques can lead to significant variations in interlaboratory comparability. This includes differences in detection of different particle sizes and overestimation of micro- and nanoplastic concentration in environmental samples due to contamination by chemical reagents.

=== Education and recycling ===
Increasing education through recycling campaigns is another proposed solution for microplastic contamination. While this would be a smaller-scale solution, education has been shown to reduce littering, especially in urban environments where there are often large concentrations of plastic waste. If recycling efforts are increased, a cycle of plastic use and reuse would be created to decrease our waste output and production of new raw materials. In order to achieve this, states would need to employ stronger infrastructure and investment around recycling. Some advocate for improving recycling technology to be able to recycle smaller plastics to reduce the need for production of new plastics.

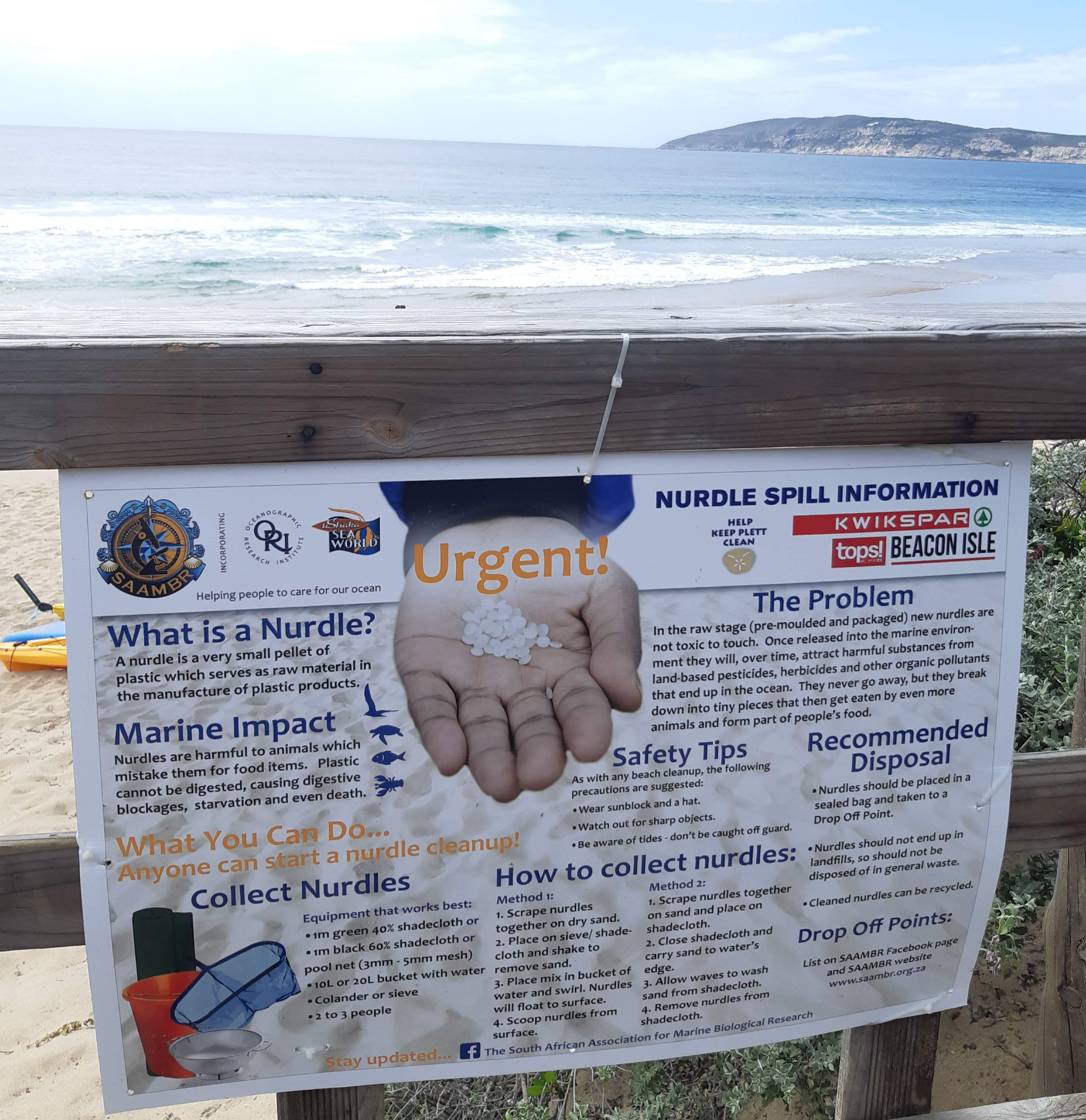
A signboard encouraging the public to collect nurdles so as to reduce their negative impact on the coastal environment.

In April 2013, Italian artist Maria Cristina Finucci founded The Garbage Patch State in order to create awareness, under the patronage of UNESCO and the Italian Ministry of the Environment.

In February 2013 the U.S. Environmental Protection Agency (EPA) launched its "Trash-Free Waters" initiative to prevent single-use plastic wastes from ending up in waterways and ultimately the ocean. As of 2018, EPA collaborated with the United Nations Environment Programme–Caribbean Environment Programme (UNEP-CEP) and the Peace Corps to reduce and remove trash in the Caribbean Sea. EPA also funded various projects in the San Francisco Bay Area including one that is aimed at reducing the use of single-use plastics such as disposable cups, spoons and straws, from three University of California campuses.

The Florida Microplastic Awareness Project (FMAP), a group of volunteers who search for microplastics in coastal water samples Many organizations advocate action to counter microplastic, spreading microplastic awareness. Global advocacy aimed at achieving the target of the United Nations Sustainable Development Goal 14 hopes to prevent and significantly reduce all forms of marine pollution by 2025.

=== Funding ===
The Clean Oceans Initiative is a project launched in 2018 by the public institutions European Investment Bank, Agence Française de Développement and KfW Entwicklungsbank. Their goal was to provide up to €2 billion in lending, grants and technical assistance until 2023 to develop projects that removed pollution from waterways (with a focus on macroplastics and microplastics) before it reached the oceans. The effort focuses on initiatives that demonstrate efficient methods of minimising plastic waste and microplastics output, emphasising on riverine and coastal areas. Cassa Depositi e Prestiti (CDP), the Italian national promotional institution and financial institution for development cooperation, and the Instituto de Crédito Oficial (ICO), the Spanish promotional bank, became new partners in October 2020. As of December 2023, The Clean Oceans Initiative had funded almost €3.2 billion, exceeding 80% of its €4 billion objective. Over 20 million people were supposed to benefit from the signed project proposals, which include better wastewater treatment in Sri Lanka, China, Egypt, and South Africa, solid waste management in Togo and Senegal, and stormwater management and flood protection in Benin, Morocco, and Ecuador.

In February 2022, the initiative stated that it would increase its financing aim to €4 billion by the end of 2025. At the same time, the European Bank for Reconstruction and Development (EBRD) became the Clean Oceans Initiative's sixth member. By February 2023, the program had met 65% of its goal, with €2.6 billion spent in 60 projects benefiting more than 20 million people across Africa, Asia, Latin America, and Europe. By the beginning of 2022, more than 80% of this target was achieved, with €1.6 billion being used in long-term financing for public and private sector initiatives that minimise the discharge of plastics, microplastics, and other pollutants through enhanced solid waste, wastewater, and storm water management.

In January 2021, the European Investment Bank and the Asian Development Bank had formed the Clean and Sustainable Ocean Partnership to promote cooperative projects for a clean and sustainable ocean and blue economy in the Asia-Pacific region.

== Policy and legislation ==
With increasing awareness of the detrimental effects of microplastics on the environment, groups are now advocating for the removal and ban of microplastics from various products. One such campaign is "Beat the Microbead", which focuses on removing plastics from personal care products. The Adventurers and Scientists for Conservation run the Global Microplastics Initiative, a project to collect water samples to provide scientists with better data about microplastic dispersion in the environment. UNESCO has sponsored research and global assessment programs due to the trans-boundary issue that microplastic pollution constitutes. These environmental groups will keep pressuring companies to remove plastics from their products in order to maintain healthy ecosystems.

=== China ===
In 2018, China banned the import of recyclables from other countries, forcing those other countries to re-examine their recycling schemes. The Yangtze River in China contributes 55% of all plastic waste going to the seas. Including microplastics, the Yangtze bears an average of 500,000 pieces of plastic per square kilometer.

In 2019, Scientific American reported that China dumps 30% of all plastics in the ocean.

=== European Union ===
The European Commission has noted the increased concern about the impact of microplastics on the environment. In April 2018, the European Commission's Group of Chief Scientific Advisors commissioned a comprehensive review of the scientific evidence on microplastic pollution through the EU's Scientific Advice Mechanism. The evidence review was conducted by a working group nominated by European academies and delivered in January 2019. A Scientific Opinion based on the SAPEA report was presented to the Commission in 2019, on the basis of which the commission will consider whether policy changes should be proposed at a European level to curb microplastic pollution.

In January 2019, the European Chemicals Agency (ECHA) proposed to restrict intentionally added microplastics.

The European Union participates with 10% of the global total, around 150 000 tonnes of microplastics each year. This is 200 grams per person per year, with significant regional variance in per-capita microplastic creation.

The European Commission's Circular Economy Action Plan sets out mandatory requirements for the recycling and waste reduction of key products e.g. plastic packaging. The plan starts the process to restrict addition of microplastics in products. It mandates measures for capturing more microplastics at all stages of the lifecycle of a product. E.g. the plan would examine different policies which aim to reduce release of secondary microplastics from tires and textiles. The European Commission plans to update the Urban Waste Water Treatment Directive to further address microplastic waste and other pollution. They aim to protect the environment from industrial and urban waste water discharge. A revision to the EU Drinking Water Directive was provisionally approved to ensure microplastics are regularly monitored in drinking water. It would require countries must propose solutions if a problem is found.

The REACH restriction on synthetic polymer microparticles entered into force on 17 October 2023. Different uses have different Transition periods under the restriction. On October 17, 2031 the ban on selling polymeric granular infill for artificial sports surfaces takes place. Existing pitches that contain this material can remain in use and do not have to be removed.

In May 2026, microplastics were also added to the watch list of emergent pollutants of the European Union directive (EU) 2026/805, therefore requiring member states to develop adequate methods for their monitoring in relation with the Water Framework Directive, the Groundwater Directive and the directive on environmental quality standards in the field of water policy. Sampling and analyses methods are to be developed by December 2027.

=== Haiti ===
Haiti has no collective system for waste collection and treatment, and thus plastic is often disposed of in urban water evacuation canals, which then degrade to form microplastics. Due to tropical temperatures and average daily duration of 12 hours, the plastics present in urban waterways could degrade more rapidly. Their discharge into Port-au-Prince Bay exposes this ecosystem to a number of environmental hazards pollutants contained in the waste, and to climatic hazards, particularly ocean acidification.

On August 9, 2012, the Haitian government published a decree prohibiting the production, importation, marketing and use, of polyethylene bags and expanded polystyrene objects for foodstuffs. However, 14 Caribbean countries (more than a third) have banned single-use plastic bags and/or polystyrene containers.

On July 10, 2013, a second decree was published to once again prohibit "the importation, production or sale of expanded polystyrene articles for food use". In support of the second decree, the ministries of the Environment, Justice and Public Security, Trade and Industry as well as the Economy and Finance announced in a note published in January 2018 that specialists from the brigade will be deployed on the territory to force the application of the said decree.

=== Hong Kong ===
In 2024, the Hong Kong government implemented the first phase of its plastic restriction regulation. Promotional videos have also been produced to encourage citizens to bring their own utensils when dining out, to refrain from using disposable utensils, and to bring their own shopping bags when shopping. Merchants are prohibited from providing related plastic products to customers.

=== Japan ===
On 15 June 2018, the Japanese government passed a bill with the goal of reducing microplastic production and pollution, especially in aquatic environments. Proposed by the Environment Ministry and passed unanimously by the Upper House, this is also the first bill to pass in Japan that is specifically targeted at reducing microplastic production, specifically in the personal care industry with products such as face wash and toothpaste. This law is revised from previous legislation, which focused on removing plastic marine debris. It also focuses on increasing education and public awareness surrounding recycling and plastic waste. The Environment Ministry has also proposed a number of recommendations for methods to monitor microplastic quantities in the ocean (Recommendations, 2018). However, the legislation does not specify any penalties for those who continue manufacturing products with microplastics.

=== United Kingdom ===
The Environmental Protection (Microbeads) (England) Regulations 2017 ban the production of any rinse-off personal care products (such as exfoliants) containing microbeads. This particular law denotes specific penalties when it is not obeyed. Those who do not comply are required to pay a fine. In the event that a fine is not paid, product manufacturers may receive a stop notice, which prevents the manufacturer from continuing production until they have followed regulation preventing the use of microbeads. Criminal proceedings may occur if the stop notice is ignored.

=== United States ===
In the US, some states have taken action to mitigate the negative environmental effects of microplastics. In 2014, Illinois became the first US state to ban cosmetics containing microplastics. At the federal level, the Microbead-Free Waters Act 2015 was signed by President Barack Obama on 28 December 2015. The law bans "rinse-off" cosmetic products that perform an exfoliating function, such as toothpaste or face wash but does not apply to other products such as household cleaners. The act took effect on 1 July 2017, with respect to manufacturing, and 1 July 2018, with respect to introduction or delivery for introduction into interstate commerce. On 16 June 2020, California adopted a definition of 'microplastics in drinking water', setting the foundation for a long-term approach to studying their contamination and human health effects.

On 25 July 2018, a microplastic reduction amendment was passed by the U.S. House of Representatives. The legislation, as part of the Save Our Seas Act designed to combat marine pollution, aims to support the NOAA's Marine Debris Program. In particular, the amendment is geared towards promoting NOAA's Great Lakes Land-Based Marine Debris Action Plan to increase testing, cleanup, and education around plastic pollution in the Great Lakes. President Donald Trump signed the re-authorization and amendment bill into effect on 11 October 2018.

By June 2025, sixteen towns on the New Jersey shore had passed ordinances aimed at limiting microplastic pollution from construction sites.

== See also ==
- Citizen Science, participatory research that people without a formal scientific education can take part in.
- Microbead (research)
- Microspheres
- Plastic bans
- Plastic pollution in the Mediterranean sea
- Plastitar
- Tea bag plastics
