= Plastic pollution in the Mediterranean sea =

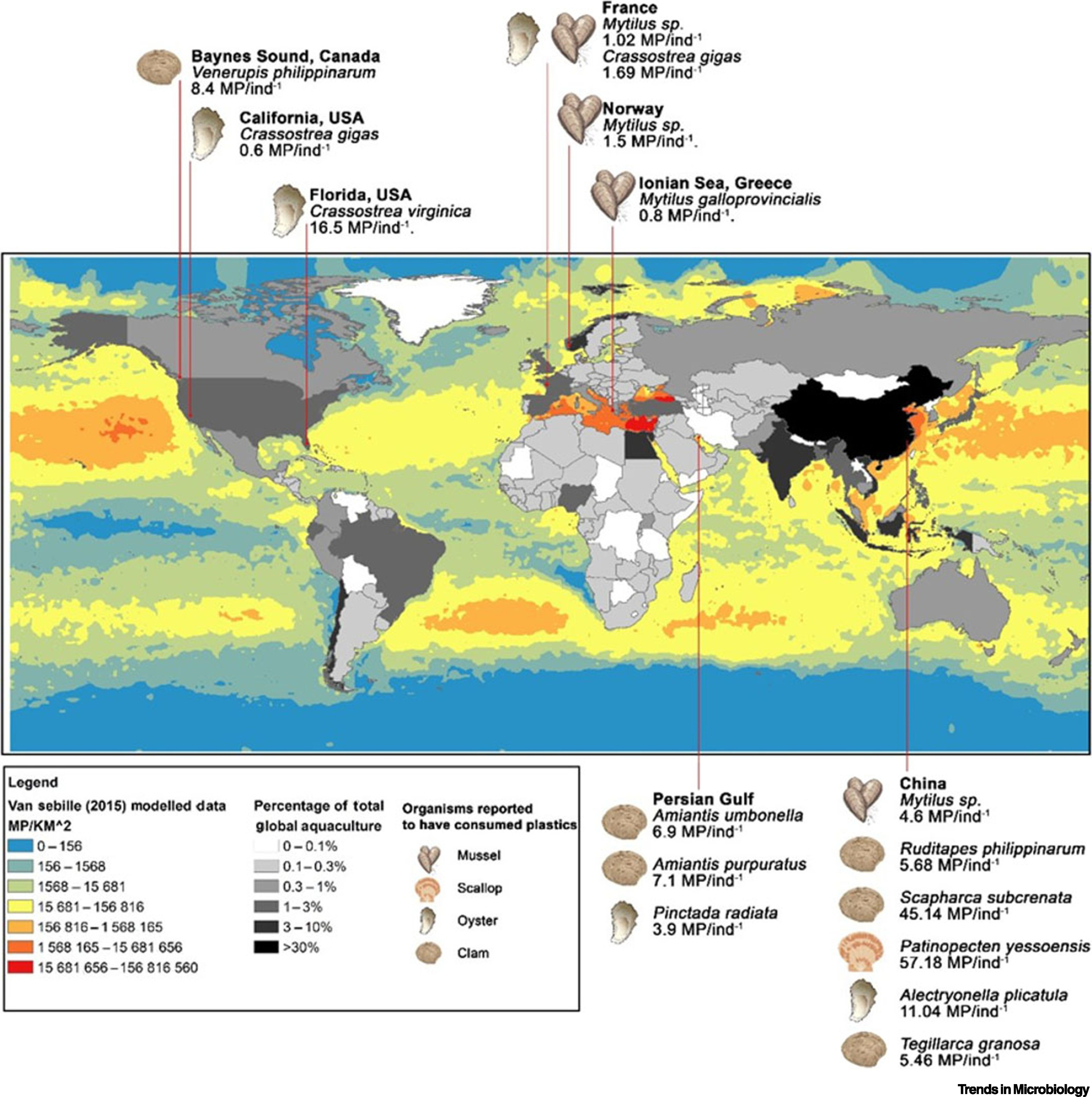
Global microplastic abundance at the ocean surface (ArcGIS)

The Mediterranean Sea has been defined as one of the seas most affected by marine plastic pollution.

It has concentrations of microplastics which are estimated to be higher than those on average found at the global level. Studies conducted within the WWF Mediterranean Marine Initiative of 2019 have estimated that 0.57 million metric tons of plastic enter the Mediterranean Sea every year; this quantity corresponds to the dumping of 33.800 bottles made of plastic into waters every minute, representing important risks for marine ecosystems, human health, but also for the blue economy of the area, whose coastal zones are very densely populated and among the first tourist destinations worldwide.

Marine plastic pollution was found in Mediterranean waters in amounts similar to those present in the ocean gyres (Indian Ocean Gyre, North Atlantic Gyre, North Pacific Gyre, South Atlantic Gyre, South Pacific Gyre). Therefore, the Mediterranean Sea is oftentimes being defined as the "world's sixth greatest accumulation zone" for marine plastic litter or as an invisible "sixth garbage patch", primarily composed of microplastics. This is an invisible garbage patch as there is no trace of permanent litter accumulation areas in the Mediterranean Sea, primarily because of the semi-enclosed shape of its basin, the cyclonic circulation and the currents present in the region.

The Mediterranean Sea receives waste from coastal areas and from waters, such as rivers (like in the case of the Nile river, which, as of 2017, brought around 200 tonnes of plastic waste into the Mediterranean basin yearly). A World Wide Fund for Nature report of 2019 estimates that, considering the Mediterranean countries, around 70% of plastic pollution coming from water-based sources comes from three areas: Egypt (41.3%), Turkey (19.1%) and Italy (7.6%). Plastic litter originating from land-based sources is instead estimated to be coming from, in decreasing order: Turkey, Morocco, Israel, Spain, France, Syria, Egypt, Albania, Tunisia and Italy.

Initiatives are being implemented at various levels to reduce and end the problem of marine plastics pollution in the Mediterranean Sea; however, the governance of this problem is very complex because of the nature of such plastics (especially microplastics), the transboundary character of this matter, the difficulties connected with the multiplicity of the actors involved, the increasing levels of production of plastics and the issues connected with responsibility at different levels.

== History of research on the problem ==
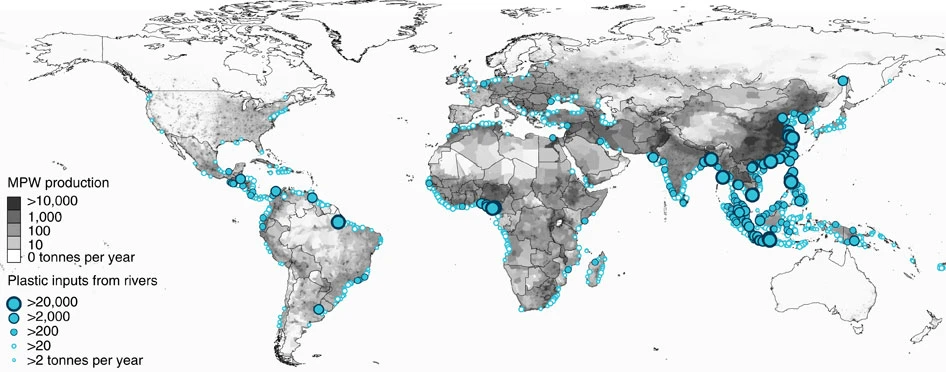
Mass of river plastic flowing into oceans

Studies on marine plastic pollution began in the 1970s, when plastic debris was found in gyres in the Sargasso Sea and the first scientific findings were published in 1972.

Around a decade later, in the 1980s, the first researches focusing on the problem of marine plastic pollution in the Mediterranean Sea were published. The first study on the Mediterranean basin focused on an area 40 miles SW of Malta and reported the presence of floating debris, the majority of which was constituted by plastic.

This body of research focusing on the Mediterranean continued growing in the 1990s, with numerous studies on the impacts, especially biological, of plastic pollution in the marine environment and with the start of interstate discussions, primarily in the form of conferences such as, among others, that of the "International Symposium on plastics in Mediterranean countries". However, the real increase in the number and variety of such studies only came later, around 2010, when more pieces of information on the quantity and distribution of plastics in the Mediterranean Sea was made accessible, when the knowledge on microplastics was being spread and when the impacts started to be addressed through diverse investigations as a concern.

Recent research, conducted at various regional, national and international levels, addresses the impacts of plastic pollution in the Mediterranean Sea from ecological, biological, economic and social points of view and the possibilities in terms of reduction efforts and governance of the problem, also while awaiting the prospective Global plastic pollution treaty.

== Types of plastics found in the Mediterranean Sea ==
Plastics accounts for 80% of waste dispersed in the marine and coastal environment of the Mediterranean Sea. Recent studies focus on the types of plastics found and primarily on the issue of microplastics, both at a global but also at a regional level, as in the case of the Mediterranean Sea, which was identified as a "target hotspot of the world" due to its amounts of microplastics, around four times higher than those present in the North Pacific Ocean. In the Mediterranean Sea, microplastics are found on surface waters, as well as on beaches and deep seafloor. 94% of microplastic items present in the Mediterranean Sea are thought to be in the seabed, 5% on beaches and 1% on surface waters.

=== Plastics on Mediterranean beaches and surface waters ===
Plastics has been identified as the primary source of litter found on beaches of the Mediterranean Sea. Researches conducted between 2019 and 2023 within the framework of the COMMON project ("COastal Management and MOnitoring Network for tackling marine litter in the Mediterranean Sea", financed by the European Union through the ENI CBC MED programme) show that, out of more than 90.000 collected objects on beaches of Italy, Tunisia and Lebanon, 17.000 are cigarette butts and 6.000 are cotton buds sticks, which contain plastics.

Earlier researches, conducted in 2016, present similar findings and show that the ten "top marine litter items" found on beaches and surface waters of the Mediterranean Sea were, from the most abundant: cigarette butts and filters, plastic and polystyrene pieces, plastic caps and lids and plastic rings from bottle caps and lids, cotton bud sticks, nets and pieces of nets, bottles, foam sponge, cigarette packets, plastic bags and what remains from these when they are ripped off. These items, primarily made of single-use plastics, account for more than 60% of marine waste in the beaches and surface waters of the Mediterranean Sea.

The surface waters of the Mediterranean Sea present concentrations of microplastics that, according to a 2015 study (UNEP/MAP), are above 100.000 objects per km2, with more than 64.000.000 floating particles per km2. As of 2019, the most common types of microplastics found are polyethylene, polystyrene, polyester and polypropylene.

=== Plastics in the Mediterranean seafloor ===
Plastic litter that accumulates in the Mediterranean Sea is fragmented into small particles that then tend to gather in the seabed. Studies aimed at analysing plastic pollution in the sea floor of the Mediterranean have shown that plastic debris can be found in every depth from 900 m to 3000 m; plastic litter could be found in 92.8% of the surveys collected from the Mediterranean deep-sea.

Particular attention is now being devoted to the presence of microplastics and nanoplastics in the Mediterranean seabed and sediments, the two regions with the highest levels of microplastics in the Mediterranean Sea. In 2020, scientists from the University of Manchester analysed sediment samples of the Mediterranean Sea and identified the highest concentration ever recorded of microplastics on sediments of the sea floor; the scientists also discovered that such microplastics are moved by wind, storms, hurricane and currents present in the sea bed which then make them accumulate in specific areas. Once these items are deposited, their degradation is minimal because of a lack of oxygen or light and therefore the microplastics, once they come to the seafloor, remain preserved.

Another study from 2020 has led to the discovery of two types of plastic debris in the Mediterranean seabed for the first time, on Giglio Island, Italy: plasticrust and pyroplastics. Plasticrust had been found for the first time in the Atlantic Ocean. This discovery revealed that the contamination by plastic debris may be more widespread than previously expected.

=== Plastics in Marine Protected Areas ===
Researches on the sediment of the Cabrera Archipelago National Maritime-Terrestrial Park marine protected area has found that the majority of plastic debris in these waters is microplastics, probably transported by wave currents and winds; the study also showed that higher amounts of microplastics were found in the marine protected area rather than on other samples taken from different sites, thus opening the debate regarding the protection and conservation of these areas. Other studies on the presence of plastic debris in marine protected areas have been conducted, among others, in the waters of the Natural Park of Telaščica bay in Croatia and on the EU Site of Community Interest in the North-West Adriatic; both areas present marine litter, primarily in the form of microplastics and mesoplastics.

== Sources of plastic litter in the Mediterranean Sea ==
The Mediterranean Sea is considered as a hotspot for plastic pollution and one of the most impacted regions of the world by this problem. As of 2019, of the estimated 10.000 tons of plastic input per year in the Mediterranean Sea, half of this litter had land-based origins (from coastal zones) whereas the other half originated from rivers and maritime routing. This is the case for example of the Nile River which, as of 2017, brought around 200 tonnes of plastic waste into the Mediterranean basin yearly.

Once plastic waste reaches Mediterranean waters, it hardly gets out: the peculiar shape of the Mediterranean sea and its currents mean that the outflow circulation of waters is limited and, therefore, that the waste that enters from the coastlines remains inside the Mediterranean, accumulating within it.

Researchers identify some main causes of the large presence of plastic pollution in this Sea: namely its semi-enclosed shape, its densely populated coasts, tourism activities, fishing, shipping, waste disposal problems, increase of the use of plastic and unsustainable consumption patterns.

=== Land-based sources of plastic litter in the Mediterranean Sea ===
The primary land-based sources of plastic pollution in the Mediterranean Sea are tourism activities, vast population on the coasts, inefficient management of waste, unsustainable consumption patterns and increase on the use of plastics. According to a UNEP report, inhabitants and tourists of the Mediterranean region produce 24 million metric tons of plastic waste (of which less than 6% is recycled) each year; this figure normally grows during the summer because of tourism presence and activities. Mediterranean countries are the world's number one tourism destination (considering both international and domestic visitors) and waste management facilities frequently experience overload. Most of the waste produced is dumped into unprotected landfills and gets into the Mediterranean Sea through stormwater runoffs, wind currents, rivers, wastewater streams. To this extent, considering the fact that wastewater is a pathway for waste disposal in open waters, a key challenge is also constituted by the fact that only small percentages of wastewater in the Mediterranean area undergo basic and tertiary treatment.

=== Ocean-based sources of plastic litter in the Mediterranean Sea ===
Ocean-based sources of plastic litter are connected with some important economic sectors in the Mediterranean: fisheries, shipping and acquaculture, which generate diverse types of debris that ends up in waters. The shipping sector in the Mediterranean Sea is very important as about 15% of global shipping passes through this region. Cruise-liners, military fleets, oil and gas stations, drilling activities are other ocean-based sources of plastic litter: the debris produced is then fragmented into microplastics present at all levels of the Mediterranean basin.

== Impacts and costs of plastic pollution in the Mediterranean Sea ==
As the Mediterranean Sea is characterised by a rich biodiversity, ecological value and intense presence of economic activities, the current and future impacts of marine plastic pollution in this area are particularly high. The Mediterranean Sea in fact hosts between 4% and 18% of all marine exemplars, and tourism on the coastal zones, aquaculture, the fishing industry and maritime transport represent substantial sources of income for the Mediterranean countries .

Research shows that marine plastic pollution has impacts on marine ecosystems and economic activities at various levels, but further studies are currently being conducted to thoroughly investigate the size of such impacts in the Mediterranean area, both on marine biota and on human health.

=== Biological and ecological impacts ===
A study conducted by Legambiente on 700 individuals of 6 different fish species discovered that one out of three fish had ingested plastic items and that more than half of the sea turtles that were analysed presented plastic litter either inside or around the body. Other studies found traces of ingested plastic debris also in the stomachs of seabirds and nanoplastic particles in mussels.

These are just some of the signals of the negative impact that plastic litter has on the marine biodiversity of the Mediterranean basin. Marine plastic litter causes problems not only in terms of the accidental ingestion of plastic items (which can lead to gastrointestinal blockages, diseases and mortality), but also in terms of the toxic effects that additives used in plastics can have. Moreover, studies have shown that plastic items soaks up contaminants in a more rapid and efficient way than organic items floating on sea waters. Long-term exposure to such plastic items and the contaminants, in particular microplastic debris, has been shown to have topological effects on species living in regions where marine plastic pollution is intense, like in the case of the Mediterranean region, whose ecosystem is in constant contact with plastics.

=== Impacts on human health ===
Potential impacts on human health are connected, among others, with the possibility of eating fish that had ingested plastics, of drinking waters that do not undergo treatment, or through releases of chemical substances. However, effects of plastics (and especially microplastics) on human health are a particularly debated topic within scholars and researchers and more studies are being conducted to assess these effects.

=== Impacts and costs on marine industries ===
The dangerous effect of plastic pollution has also noticeable impacts on the blue economy of the Mediterranean basin, in particular on the tourism, fishing and shipping sectors. Calculating the complete economic impacts of marine plastic litter in the Mediterranean Sea is very complicated due to the various sources, the impacts at the environmental, social and economic levels, and the number of involved sectors in different geographic locations. A 2021 report by UNEP tried estimating annual losses of US$700 million on the entire blue economy of the Mediterranean Sea. Because of current waves, high amounts of plastic objects accumulate on beaches, thus demanding continuous clean-ups and potentially disincentivizing tourism.

Aquaculture and fishery are impacted as the marine ecosystem is affected and as litter can damage nets, contaminate the catches and also reduce them. For the fishing sector, researches of 2021 estimate a general annual loss of euros 61.7 millions due to marine debris in European countries; this figure is also comprising a loss due to the decreasing of demand of fish products due to concerns on the quality of these items. The specific loss at the Mediterranean level is more complicated to calculate but scholars argue the costs are considered to be higher to the substantial concentration of marine litter.

The shipping sector suffers economic pressures too, as plastic marine litter, among others, can damage motors, which then have to be repaired. Assessments on the impact of plastic marine litter on the shipping sector in the Mediterranean region are being conducted.

=== Social and clean up costs ===
Marine pollution in the Mediterranean has led to an increase in the costs sustained by diverse local, regional and national authorities to clean-up the beaches and coastal areas. For example, as of 2016, Nice's administration spent around euros 2 million to clean up beaches.

Analysis conducted within the CleanSea project estimated a cost of Euros 3.800 to clean up one tonne of marine litter in European countries' beaches: Euros 2.200 have been estimated to be spent annually to clean up each tonne of floating plastic litter.

Other impacts have been registered at the local level with losses of income and jobs in the tourism sector, as well as losses in values of residential property.

== Reduction efforts ==
Marine plastic pollution has been defined as a global concern by the European Union, the G7 and G20, the United Nations Environment Programme (UNEP) and various organisations and institutions at local, regional and international levels. Over the last few years, marine plastic debris has started to be recognised as a relevant issue also in terms of its governance and regulatory complexities, which are also due to the fact that it is a transboundary, "multifaceted" problem, with multiple causes, sources and actors involved, and that requires integrated approaches and solutions at various levels.

National, regional and international actors, along with civil society and private industries are trying to address the problem of pollution in the Mediterranean Sea with initiatives, policies, campaigns. The majority of these initiatives addresses marine pollution in general, while also focusing, among others, on the problem of marine plastic pollution in the Mediterranean Sea and region.

=== Policies and conventions on the Mediterranean Sea ===
The Barcelona Convention, which was adopted in 1995, was the first regional treaty aiming at reducing pollution, and marine plastic pollution, in the Mediterranean region; the European Union and all countries with a Mediterranean shoreline are parties to the Convention and to the Protocol for the Protection of the Mediterranean Sea against Pollution from Land Based Sources and to Activities that concern plastic pollution in the Mediterranean basin.

The Barcelona Convention and its Protocols were established within the regional cooperation platform "Mediterranean Action Plan of the United Nations Environment Programme" (UNEP/MAP), the first regional action plan of the UNEP Regional Seas Programme, which was instrumental in the adoption of the Convention itself. The UNEP/MAP - Barcelona Convention System has been playing a role for responding to environmental challenges threatening marine and coastal ecosystems in the Mediterranean region. It collects data for marine debris, litter in waters and on coastlines, amounts of plastic litter ingested by marine species.

The first ever legal binding instrument with the purpose of preventing and limiting marine plastic pollution and of cleaning up marine litter already affecting the area of the Mediterranean Sea is the "Regional Plan on Marine Litter Management" (RPML) in the Mediterranean, which was adopted, among others, in the framework of the Barcelona Convention in 2013. The Plan is further supported by the EU funded "Marine Litter MED II project" (2020-2023), which is focused on countries of the Southern Mediterranean (Algeria, Egypt, Libya, Morocco, Tunisia, Israel and Lebanon) and is built on the results of the Marine Litter MED project, carried out between 2016 and 2019.

Scholars have argued that an international agreement among countries with shorelines on the Mediterranean Sea could be pursued, with actions focused on eliminating plastic waste in nature, on creating plans for the prevention, control and removal of plastic litter from marine ecosystems, on banning specific types of plastic products and prevent their dumping into waters, and on establishing international committees.

The prospective Global Plastic Pollution Treaty is awaited.

=== Marine Protected Areas ===
Marine Protected Areas represent a policy instrument which can be helpful in reducing plastic pollution in seas and its impacts on marine ecosystems, as they ban or limit fisheries, some tourism activities, dumping of materials, mining and building of harbours and offshore wind farms. Nevertheless, high levels of plastic pollution, especially microplastics, have been recorded in Marine Protected Areas in the Mediterranean Sea. Initiatives focusing specifically on Marine Protected Areas and plastic pollution in the Mediterranean region are awaited.

=== Other actors, initiatives and programmes ===
Programmes and strategies at the EU level address the problem of plastic pollution in Europe's seas, therefore also the Mediterranean Sea. Key policies are the EU Green Deal and the Zero Pollution Action Plan, of which an important goal is that of reducing waste, marine plastic pollution and the dispersal of microplastics. Among the relevant strategies, some are the Water Framework Directive, the Industrial Emissions Directive, the Environmental Liability Directive, the Environmental Crimes Directive, the Waste Framework Directive, the Waste Shipment Regulation, the Packaging and Packaging Waste Directive, the Single-Use Plastics Directive. The Marine Strategy Framework Directive constitutes the EU legal framework for the safeguard and preservation of the European Seas, also from marine plastic litter; the Directive addresses the importance of identifying the sources of marine litter and its impacts to deploy efficient and comprehensive measures. Among various actions, there is the European Union's ban on diverse kinds of single-use plastics.

The EU has invited Mediterranean countries to implement legal, administrative and financial actions to create sustainable waste management systems to limit the problem of plastic pollution in the Mediterranean Sea.

Some of the other actors carrying out activities to raise awareness and build knowledge on the topic of plastic pollution in the Mediterranean Sea involve: the Union for the Mediterranean; the International Union for the Conservation of Nature and IUCN-Med, which conducts researches on macro, micro and nano plastics in the Mediterranean Sea and builds partnerships and alliances for the implementation of projects in the region;WWF with different analyses and projects, such as the WWF Mediterranean Marine Initiative; the Mediterranean Information Office for Environment, Culture and Sustainable Development (MIO-ECSDE) and the MARLISCO project; Mediterranean Experts on Climate and Environmental Change.

States and civil societies actors are also operating and creating partnerships (like in the case of the COastal Management and MOnitoring Network for tackling marine litter in the Mediterranean Sea) in awareness-raising initiatives and in clean-up activities on the coastlines of the Mediterranean Sea, like in the case of OGYRE and ENALEIA, who are directly cooperating with fishermen in cleaning various seas, including the Mediterranean Sea. Other clean-up activities comprise the "Mediterranean CleanUP" (MCU), "Clean up the Med" by Legambiente and spontaneous initiatives at various levels.

The Day of the Mediterranean is celebrated each year on 28 November to commemorate the foundation of the Barcelona Convention and to raise awareness on various issues of the Mediterranean basin, among which that of plastic pollution.
