= Trojan Horse effect =

Diffusion effect

The Trojan Horse effect is a phenomenon of substances that act as carriers for other compounds, facilitating their transport. An example of this is observed with microplastics that act as carriers of organic compounds to new sites in the environment via sorption and desorption.

An example in the field of medicine is the administration of medicine across the blood–brain barrier via lipid nanoparticles. The Trojan Horse effect is used by some antibiotics that have the active compound bound to a mimic molecules desirable to the bacteria.
