= Rotor current meter =

Mechanical current meter used in oceanography to measure flow

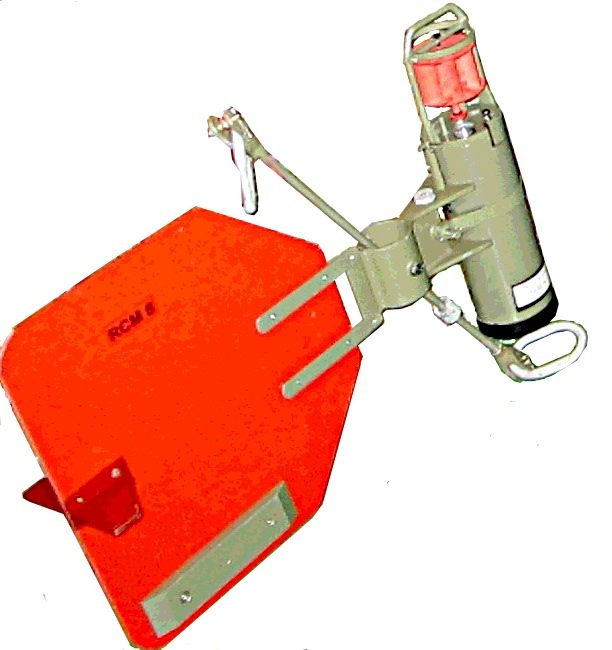
Rotor current meter RCM 8 with red vane and Savonius-rotor.

A rotor current meter (RCM) is a mechanical current meter, an oceanographic device deployed within an oceanographic mooring measuring the flow within the world oceans to learn more about ocean currents. Many RCMs have been replaced by instruments measuring the flow by hydroacoustics, the so-called Acoustic Doppler Current Profilers. However, for instance in Fram Strait, the Alfred Wegener Institute still uses RCMs for long-term monitoring the inflow into the Arctic Ocean.

== Measurement principle ==
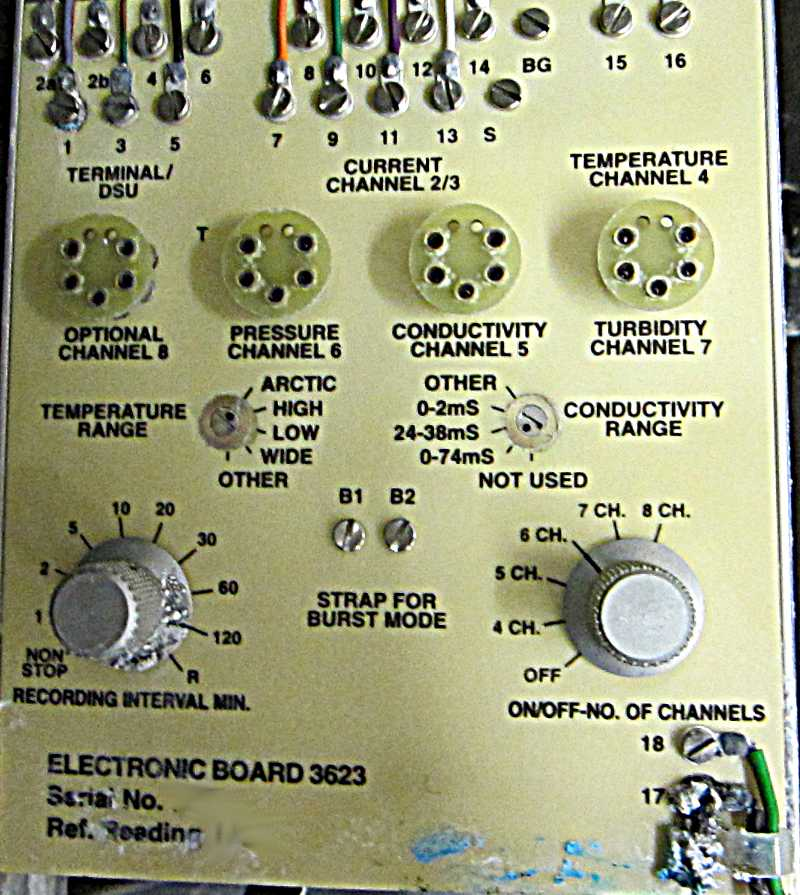
Data storage unit of an RCM-8.

A RCM usually consists of the recording unit, a propeller to detect the water velocity and a vane to determine the direction of the flow. The gimbal rings of the RCM-instruments allow to compensate a tilt of up to 40° of the mooring line.

The recording unit houses a battery pack for energy supply, the Analog-to-digital converter, possible additional sensors for other variables (like the standard parameters conductivity, temperature, depth, CTD) and a micro-controller. According to the data sheet of the instruments RCM 7/8, the micro-controller performs the following tasks:

A built-in clock triggers the instrument at preset intervals and a total of six channels are sampled in sequence. The first channel is a fixed reference reading for control purposes and data identification. Channels 2, 3 and 4 represent measurement of temperature, conductivity and depth respectively. Channels 5 and 6 represent the vector averaged current speed and direction since the previous triggering of the instrument. The data is sequentially fed to the Data Storage Unit (DSU) 2990 or 2990E.

— RCM 7/8 Manual

The movement of Earth's north magnetic pole across the Canadian arctic, 1831–2007.

The flow direction is detected by a magnetic compass, a needle clamped onto a potentiometer. This design becomes problematic for instruments in the Arctic Ocean since the North Magnetic Pole moves relative to the geographic North Pole and this (time-depended) magnetic declination cannot be neglected any more.

== Data quality ==
Accuracy and precision of the RCMs are topic of an ongoing discussion. Comparative studies between different types of RCMs placed close to each other show that the instruments have large systematical errors.

The following table summarizes the specification for various single-point current meters.

Instrument type	Measurement principle	Measurement error according to manual
Aanderaa RCM 7	rotor	±0.01 m/s or 4% (whatever is greater)
Aanderaa RCM 8	rotor	±0.01 m/s or 4% (whatever is greater)
Aanderaa RCM 9	acoustic, single-point	±0.0015 m/s
Aanderaa RCM 11	acoustic, single-point	±0.0015 m/s
Falmouth Scientific Instruments	state of the art ADCP	±0.005 m/s

These values only hold for medium currents between 0.02 and 2.95 m/s. Small velocities are difficult to detect because the vane shows a lot of inertia and the rotor needs to overcome friction before starting to rotate. The company Aanderaa calls the acoustical single-point instruments recording current meter which allows to keep the abbreviation RCM.
