= Nordic Seas =

Marginal seas of the Arctic Ocean

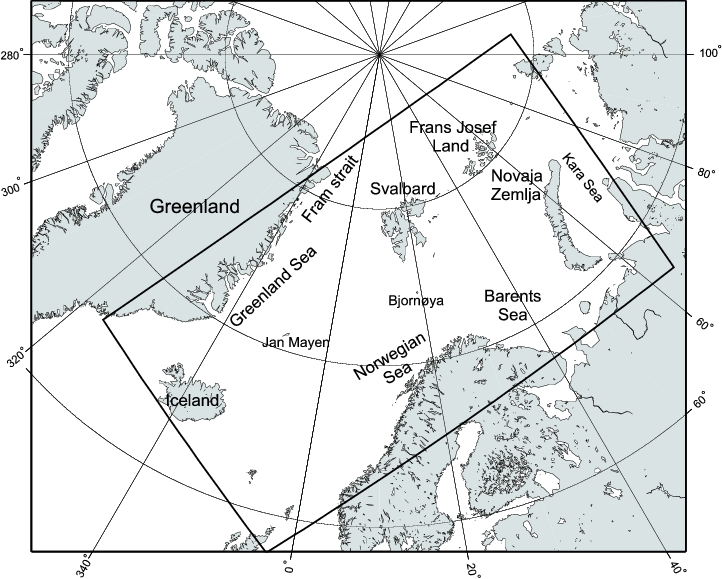
Figure 1: Map of the Nordic Seas

The Nordic Seas are located north of Iceland and south of Svalbard. They have also been defined as the region located north of the Greenland-Scotland Ridge and south of the Fram Strait-Spitsbergen-Norway intersection. Known to connect the North Pacific and the North Atlantic waters, this region is also known as having some of the densest waters, creating the densest region found in the North Atlantic Deep Water. The deepest waters of the Arctic Ocean are connected to the worlds other oceans through Nordic Seas and Fram Strait. There are three seas within the Nordic Sea: Greenland Sea, Norwegian Sea, and Iceland Sea. The Nordic Seas make up about 0.75% of the world's oceans. This region is known as having diverse features in such a small topographic area, such as the mid oceanic ridge systems. Some locations have shallow shelves, while others have deep slopes and basins. This region, because of the atmosphere-ocean transfer of energy and gases, has varying seasonal climate. During the winter, sea ice is formed in the western and northern regions of the Nordic Seas, whereas during the summer months, the majority of the region remains free of ice.

== Geology ==
The Nordic Seas include the Greenland Sea, the Norwegian Sea, and the Iceland Sea. The Greenland and the Norwegian Sea are separately distinguished by Mohn's Ridge. The Greenland and Iceland Sea are separated by the Jan Mayen fracture zone, and the Norwegian and Iceland Seas have the Aegir Ridge between them. The Nordic Seas have varying and diverse features as a result of each sea having separate water mass structures and circulation patterns. The Greenland Sea produces dense waters because of its high salinity and cooler temperatures from winter cooling. Higher salinity is present as a result of the Greenland Sea's close proximity to the salinity inflow that occurs from the Atlantic Ocean. Another dense water source comes from the Arctic waters that also flow into the Greenland Sea. These water source mixtures are important because they play a role in the overflows that occur in the North Atlantic. The water that overflows from the Greenland ridge becomes the North Atlantic Deep Water dense water, even though this body of water does not make up the deep waters of the Nordic Sea.

== Circulation ==
The circulation of the Nordic Seas is cyclonic.

The Nordic Seas exchange water with the North Atlantic in the upper ocean. Warm water from the North Atlantic enters the Nordic Seas from the east, specifically in the Norwegian Atlantic Current (part of the North Atlantic Current). The western boundary of the Nordic Seas is the southward-flowing East Greenland Current. This current enters through the Fram Straight from the Arctic. This current is considered one of the main ways for Arctic sea ice to be exported. The East Greenland Current splits into the Jan Mayen Current on the eastern boundary of the Nordic Seas due to bathymetry. The Jan Mayen Current plays an important role in the dense water formation that occurs in the Greenland Sea. Continuing northward, the Norwegian Atlantic Current flows along the coast of Norway to the Arctic, eventually separating into the Barents Sea and the Spitsbergen Current. There are several gyre circulations that occur in the Nordic Seas. The subsurface waters leave the Nordic Seas through the south from overflows between Greenland and Scotland. The intermediate water leaves through the Denmark Straight and the Iceland Ridge. The densest overflow waters leave through the Faroe-Bank Channel.

== Climate ==
Several water masses are found interacting in the Nordic Sea. These water masses are present due to subduction, deep convective mixing, surface/frontal mixing, and entrainment of water from low and high latitudes. Interaction from multiple water sources can lead to varying conditions. New primary production is higher in this region, usually exceeding regenerated primary production. New production is higher in regions where water interacts with Atlantic Water, which has nutrient-rich waters. When looking at carbon flux from the atmosphere to the ocean, this region is considered one of the highest in the world's oceans. This region is also known as being one of the few bodies of water that take up large quantities of carbon dioxide yearly, ranging from 20 to 85 g C m^{−2}y^{−1}, which is considered high in comparison the carbon dioxide flux in the world's oceans.

The water masses that encompass the Nordic Seas are always changing in response to the local variations that occur between atmosphere-ocean fluxes and convection of intermediate to deep water. The Nordic Seas are found between the North Atlantic and the Arctic Ocean, both having variable surface water conditions. The Nordic Seas are complex in the variety of water masses it contains: two surface waters, three intermediate waters, and three deep waters. Figure 3 shows the water mass circulations that occur in the Nordic Seas, displaying the surface waters, the intermediate waters, and the deep waters.

The two surface waters are the Atlantic Water and the Polar Surface Water. The Atlantic water is warm and has a higher salinity than the cooler, fresh Polar Surface Water. The difference in temperature and salinity between the two water masses plays a role in the climate of Scandinavia. The Atlantic Water enters the system with temperatures of 7 to 9 °C and a salinity of 35.2 psu. As the Atlantic water moves in the Norwegian Atlantic Current, the temperature cools to 1 to 3 °C with a salinity of 35.0 psu. The warmth provided by this current plays a role in giving Scandinavia the warmer temperatures. The Polar Surface Water has a temperature around 1.5 °C and a salinity of approximately 34 psu. Depths are around 150 meters. This water increases in temperature as it reaches the Greenland Sea, but causes colder upper waters in the Greenland Sea.

The first intermediate water is a remnant of the Atlantic Water from the East Greenland Current. This water has been cooled and covered by the Polar Surface Water. The temperature is around 2 °C with a salinity of 35 psu. The second intermediate water is the Arctic Intermediate Water. This water is cooler and fresher. The temperature is around -1.5 to 3 °C and has a salinity of approximately 34.88 psu. Depths are around 800 meters. This intermediate water is a salinity minimum layer in the Nordic Seas, which is unique in that is lies below a salinity maximum layer, the Atlantic Water. The third intermediate layer is called the upper Polar Deep Water. This water mass comes through the Fram Strait and is found in the East Greenland Current. This intermediate water has a temperature of -0.5 °C and a salinity of 34.85-34.9 psu.

The three deep waters consist of the Greenland Sea Deep Water, Norwegian Sea Deep Water, and the Arctic Ocean Deep Water. The Greenland Sea Deep Water has a temperature of approximately -1.8 °C and a salinity of 34.895 psu. This water mass is formed by deep convection that occurs intermittently in the Greenland gyre. The Arctic Ocean Deep Water is approximately 34.92 psu. This water mass has a higher salinity due to brine rejection in the Arctic Seas. The depth is around 1500 and 2000 meters. The Norwegian Sea Deep Water is a combination of the Arctic Ocean Deep Water and the Greenland Sea Deep Water. This water mass is found below 2000 meters. Because of the warmer temperatures from the North Atlantic Current, this water mass is ice-free during the year.
