= Ocean-bottom seismometer =

Type of seismometer

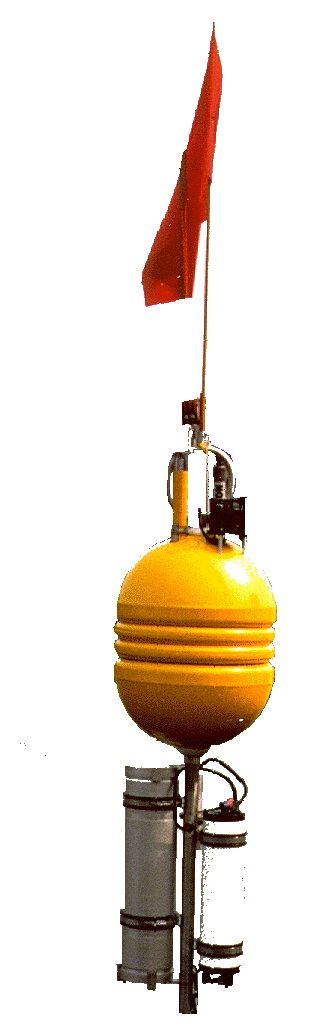

An ocean-bottom seismometer (OBS) is a seismometer that is designed to record the earth's motion under oceans and lakes from man-made sources and natural sources.

Sensors at the sea floor are used to observe acoustic and seismic events. Seismic and acoustic signals may be caused by different sources, by earthquakes and tremors as well as by artificial sources. Computing and analyzing the data yields information about the kind of source and, in case of natural seismic events, the geophysics and geology of the sea floor and the deeper crust. The deployment of OBS along a profile will give information about the deep structure of the Earth's crust and upper mantle in offshore areas. OBS may be equipped with a maximum of a three-component geophone in addition to a hydrophone, and thus it needs a capacity of more than 144 Mbytes, which would be the minimum for adequate MCS profiling. In a typical survey, the instruments should be operational for several days (deployments can exceed 12 months), which requires a data storage capacity of more than 500 Mbyte. Other experiments, such as tomographic investigations within a 3D-survey or seismological monitoring, demand even larger capacities.

== Instrument package ==
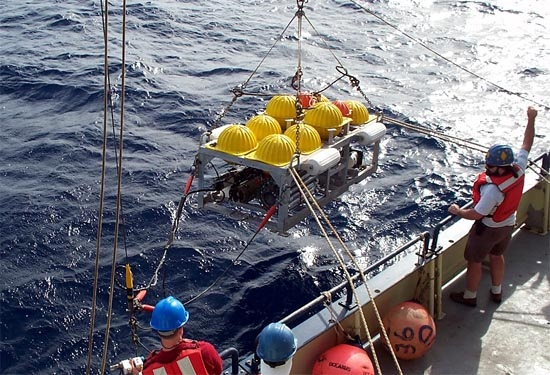
An ocean-bottom seismometer goes over the side of R/V Oceanus in early 2001, off Barbados. It will record long-period, low-frequency seismic waves for up to a year before the ship returns to retrieve the instrument. (Photo by John Whitehead, Woods Hole Oceanographic Institution)

The OBS consists of an aluminum sphere which contains sensors, electronics, enough alkaline batteries to last 10 days on the ocean bottom, and an acoustic release. The two sphere halves are put together with an O-ring and a metal clamp to hold the halves together. A slight vacuum is placed on the sphere to better ensure a seal. The sphere by itself floats, so an anchor is needed to sink the instrument to the bottom. In this case, the anchor is a flat metal plate 40 inches (1.02 meters) in diameter. The instrument has been designed to be able to deploy and recover off almost any vessel. All that is needed (for deployment and recovery) is enough deck space to hold the instruments and their anchors and a boom capable of lifting an OBS off the deck and swinging it over to lower it into the water. The OBS is bolted to the anchor and then dropped (gently) over the side.

== Working ==
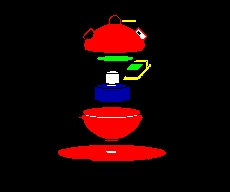

Seismometers work using the principle of inertia. The seismometer body rests securely on the sea floor. Inside, a heavy mass hangs on a spring between two magnets. When the earth moves, so do the seismometer and its magnets, but the mass briefly stays where it is. As the mass oscillates through the magnetic field it produces an electric current which the instrument measures. The seismometer itself is a small metal cylinder; the rest of the footlocker-sized OBS consists of equipment to run the seismometer (a data logger and batteries), weight to sink it to the sea floor, a remote-controlled acoustic release and flotation to bring the instrument back to the surface.

== Types of OBS ==
The ground motion caused by earthquakes can be extremely small (less than a millimeter) or large (several meters). Small motions have high frequencies, so monitoring them requires measuring movement many times per second and produces huge amounts of data. Large motions are much rarer, so instruments need to record data less frequently, to save memory space and battery power for longer deployments. Because of this variability, engineers have designed two basic kinds of seismometers:

=== Short-period OBSs ===
They record high-frequency motions (up to hundreds of times per second). They can record small, short-period earthquakes and are also useful for studying the outer tens of kilometers of the seafloor. Technical details for two models: WHOI D2 and Scripps L-CHEAPO.

=== Long-period OBSs ===
They record a much broader range of motions, with frequencies of about 10 per second to once or twice a minute. They are used for recording mid-sized earthquakes and seismic activity far from the instrument. Technical details for two models: WHOI long-deployment OBS and Scripps long-deployment OBS.

=== Custom OBSs ===
Custom OBS are beginning to be developed, as the need for expansion on coverage in the field of seismology increases and permanent deployments are necessary. One customizations to improve the data quality of the seismometers is to borehole the seismometer in an aluminium casing into the surface (~1 m) to create stability in the soft sediment of the ocean floor. Another customization that is possible is to add a differential pressure gauge (DPG) and/or current meter, to understand how the pressure is changing around the seismometer. It can also be practical to store the datalogger and battery in a glass Benthos sphere to be able to connect to the ship through the use of a remotely operated vehicle (ROV), which is a necessary advancement to have and maintain permanent OBS deployments.

This shows a P wave (red) converting into an S wave (blue), with the P wave having the ability to travel through the ocean and reflect bown off of the surface into the seismometer. This creates water multiples that do not exist when the seismometer has free-air above it.

== Advantages ==
Very stable clocks make comparable the readings from many far-flung seismometers. (Without reliable time-stamps, data from different machines would be unusable.) Development of these clocks was a crucial advance for seismologists studying the Earth's interior. After recovering an ocean-bottom seismometer, scientists can offload the instrument's data by plugging in a data cable. This feature saves the task of gingerly disassembling the instrument's protective casing while aboard a rolling ship. The ability to connect a seismometer to a mooring or observatory makes the instrument's data instantly available. This is a huge advantage for geologists scrambling to respond to a major earthquake.

== Disadvantages ==
The environment of these deployments complicates standard methods that are used in analyzing the data because of the ocean on top of the seismometer, as opposed to free-air above a typical land station. These seismometers also have a decreased signal-to-noise ratio because of noise created by the movement of the oceans due to wind driven tides, particularly at periods of 7 and 14 seconds. This long period motion and current flowing around the seismometer can create problems of long period noise on the horizontal components because the soft (saturated) sediment that the seismometer is resting on is more susceptible to allow the seismometer to tilt and ideally, the horizontal component will not move and be perpendicular to gravity to get the best results out of the seismometer. The saturated sediment also reduces signal-to-noise ratio significantly because the velocity of the P and S waves decreases and the seismic waves get trapped in the sediment layer creating a large amplitude ringing due to the conservation of energy.

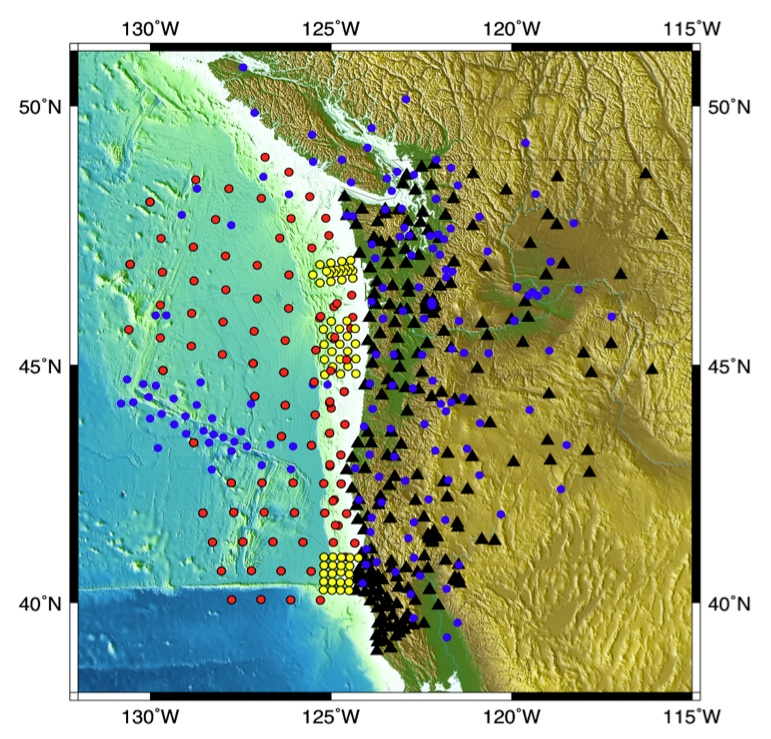
This is a map of the land and ocean-bottom stations that were deployed in the Cascadia Initiative. (Photo from http://cascadia.uoregon.edu/CIET/cascade-initiative-background)

== Notable deployments ==
One of the largest OBS deployments ever was The Big Mantle Electromagnetic and Tomography (Big MELT) Experiment, involving almost 100 OBS in the East Pacific Rise with the goal of understanding magma generation and mid-ocean ridge development. The Cascadia Initiative is an offshore/onshore deployment to observe the deformation of the Juan de Fuca and Gorda plates, as well as topics ranging from megathrust earthquakes to volcanic arc structure in the Pacific Northwest. The Hawaiian PLUME (Plume-Lithosphere Undersea Melt Experiment) was an onshore/offshore (predominantly offshore) deployment to better understand what type of mantle plume is beneath Hawaii and to better understand the mantle upwelling in this region and its relationship to the lithosphere. The Asthenospheric and Lithospheric Broadband Architecture from the California Offshore Region Experiment (ALBACORE) deployment from 2010 to 2011 of 34 OBS to help better understand the tectonic interaction at the Pacific-North America plate boundary and deformation styles of the Pacific plate and the nearby microplates.
