= Greenland Current =

Greenland Current may refer to:

- West Greenland Current
- East Greenland Current
