= Releaser =

The term releaser may refer to:

- Monoamine releasing agent
- A type of stimulus that can elicit a fixed action pattern
- Acoustic release
