= Barents Sea Opening =

Area of the Western Barents Sea

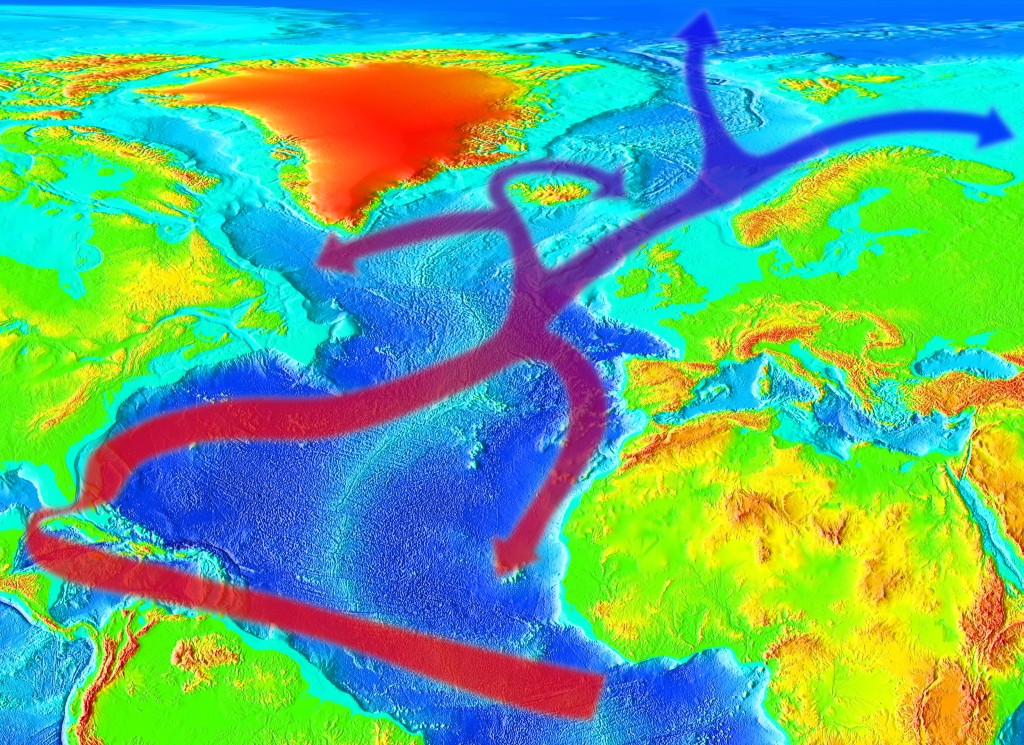
The upper right arrow symbolizes the Norwegian Current flowing through the BSO. Some waters originates from the North Atlantic Current which continues the Gulf Stream to the North-East.

The Barents Sea Opening (BSO) is an oceanographic term for the Western Barents Sea. It is a sea area between Bear Island in the south of Svalbard and the northern extremity of Norway through which a water mass of Atlantic origin flows into the Arctic Ocean. The inflow of relative warm water into the Arctic Ocean occurs not only through the Barents Sea Opening, but also through Fram Strait which is much deeper. The internal energy entering the colder waters has an influence on the atmosphere and the sea ice above and therefore possibly on the global climate.

== Oceanographic measurements ==
The Norwegian Polar Institute performs about six hydrographic survey per year across the Barents Sea Opening from 71.58°N 20°E to 73.58°N 20°E since 1977. A set of oceanographic current meters captures the seasonal cycle of the inflow since 1997. Roughly every 30 nm two instruments are deployed, one at 50 m depth, and another 15 m above the sea floor.
