= Whalers Bay =

Whalers Bay or Whaler's Bay can refer to:

- Whalers Bay (Svalbard)
- Whalers Bay (South Shetland Islands)
- Whalers Bay Whaling Site, Thistle Island, on Thistle Island, South Australia
