= High capacity oceanographic lithium battery pack =

Type of battery pack used by oceanographers

A High capacity oceanographic lithium battery pack is a type of battery pack used by oceanographers. Physical Oceanographers use high capacity lithium battery packs for long term deployments of oceanographic instruments to extend the duration of the deployments between service intervals and gather more data. Oceanographic instruments are often located in remote sites that are difficult to get to. The cost of accessing deployed instruments, often by ship, can dominate the cost of an investigation. This motivates oceanographers to extend the duration of instrument deployments so that they can visit them less often. This means, among other things, increasing the capacity of their battery packs.

== Reasons for use ==
When possible, oceanographers use alkaline batteries because they are inexpensive and readily available. However, when alkaline batteries provide insufficient capacity, oceanographers turn to lithium battery packs, which can supply three times the capacity. Battery packs based on lithium thionyl chloride chemistry cost more than alkaline battery packs, but they provide roughly three times the energy density at about 60% of the weight (both by volume). Lithium batteries have other advantages as well. They produce negligible gas, and what gas is produced is contained in hermetically sealed metal containers. The voltage over the life of the pack varies considerably less than the voltage of an alkaline pack. Low current lithium cells also have relatively low self-discharge, losing less than 10% of their capacity in 10 years.

== Battery Pack Design ==
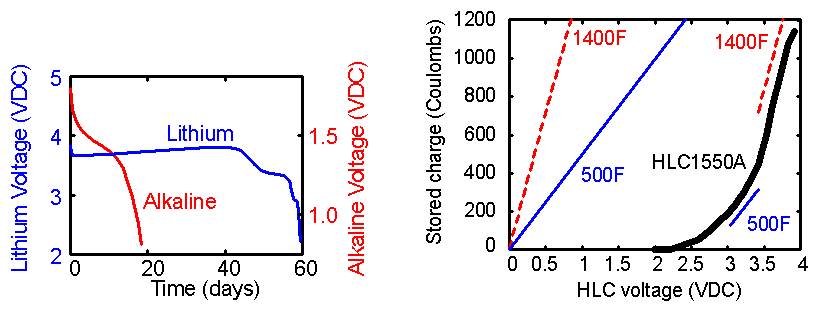
Fig. 1. Left. Lithium cell voltage profile, compared with an alkaline cell. Both profiles assume depletion using the same constant power. Fig. 2. Right. Comparison of stored charge vs. voltage for HLCs and large capacitors. Over narrow voltage ranges, the HLC's stored charge increases as voltage increases, with slopes that look like 500 F -1400 F capacitors.

Doppler Ltd. oceanographic battery packs use Tadiran's TL6930 low current lithium thionyl chloride primary cells combined with small rechargeable cells called Hybrid Layer Capacitors (HLC). Low current lithium cells cannot supply the currents required for many applications, but they store more energy than high current cells. High current cells use spiral wound electrodes, that is, electrodes built in sheets wrapped in a spiral inside the cell. The large surface area of the sheets increases the current that the cell can supply. Low current cells use bobbin electrodes, a simpler design consisting of an inner anode, an outer layer of metallic lithium, and electrolyte between the two. This design is less costly to manufacture, and it stores more energy.

=== Cell characteristics ===
The TL6930 cells work well over typical ocean temperatures (0-40 °C), and for typical ocean deployments (1 month - 2 years). At a temperature of 5-10 °C, one TL6930 holds roughly three times the energy of the same size alkaline cell. Most of that difference is accounted by the lithium cell's higher voltage (nominally 3.8 VDC vs. 1.5 VDC). Fig. 1 provides an example of how the voltage on these cells varies with time, assuming both cells supply the same continuous power. The lithium cell lasts 3 times as long as an alkaline cell, and sustains a more constant voltage during its life. Primary lithium cells also hold several times the capacity of rechargeable lithium cells.

=== Hybrid layer capacitors ===
Most oceanographic instruments use little power most of the time, and only require high currents for short durations. Examples are instrument systems that telemeter data through Iridium, and acoustic modems (e.g. from Benthos or Link-Quest). ADCPs also require short pulses of high current to support high power acoustic transmissions. HLCs are the key that enables low current lithium battery packs to supply short pulses of high current. HLCs are actually rechargeable lithium cells that behave like huge capacitors over a narrow voltage range (Fig. 2).

=== Cell arrangement ===
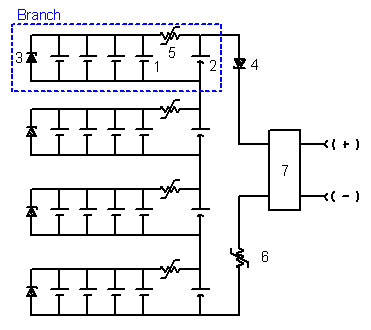
Fig. 3. Schematic of a typical Pulses Plus battery pack. The components are: 1) Primary lithium cell, 2) HLC, 3,4) Schottky diode, 5,6) PTC, 7) Safety circuit.

Most alkaline battery packs used by oceanographers are built with strings of cells. A typical alkaline battery pack often consists of a number of strings of alkaline cells, all connected in parallel to increase the total capacity. PulsesPlus packs take the opposite approach. Packs are constructed in "branches" of parallel primary cells, each branch charging one or more HLCs. The HLC sources most of the current when high currents are required, then the HLCs slowly recharge at a low current from the primary cells. The cell's low current enables it to work more efficiently. High current dissipates energy as heat inside low current cells and has other detrimental affects. These reduce the energy available to power instrumentation. Combining the primary lithium cells with HLCs enables the pack to deliver more of its stored energy to the instrument system.

=== Short circuit protection ===
Fig. 3 shows a typical Pulses Plus schematic. The pack includes diodes in each branch to minimize the possibility of reverse charging the cells. PTCs, or positive temperature coefficient thermistors act as resettable fuses. PTCs begin to get warm at a trip current. The warmth increases their resistance which produces even more heat, and the PTC quickly "trips" and shuts off most of the current. The PTC rarely trips in a typical ADCP pack, because the safety circuit is the primary protection against short circuits (defined to be any current above about 8 A). The safety circuit also turns off the pack before its voltage falls below a threshold. If the pack were allowed to fully discharge, one branch could discharge before the others, which could lead to the discharged branch being charged by the remaining cells. Any attempt to charge a lithium cell is potentially dangerous, and turning the pack off at about 75-80% of its starting voltage prevents this from happening. At this voltage, only around 3% of the capacity remains, but the remaining capacity still allows years for disposal of the pack before it discharges fully.

== Pre-Deployment Test ==
Because oceanographers spend considerable time and money in long term deployments, then wait to see the results, oceanographers invest extraordinary efforts prior to deployments to ensure the success of their experiments. One of their concerns is battery failure. Doppler Ltd's Acoustic Doppler Current Profiler (ADCP) batteries provide an example of lithium battery packs that an oceanographer can test prior to deployment. These battery packs are commonly used in RD Instruments Workhorse Sentinel and Long Ranger and in Nortek's AWAC. These lithium packs, based on Tadiran's PulsesPlus technology are designed considerably differently from typical alkaline battery packs.

=== Safety circuit ===
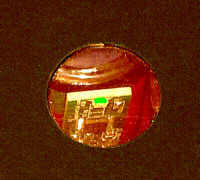
Fig. 4. Safety circuit behind a plastic window on a lithium battery pack.

In additions to its safety functions, the safety circuit also provides a self test that confirms the health of the pack in advance of a deployment. If there is no window with an LED behind it, the pack should not be shorted. Only battery packs with safety circuits instantly turn off the pack in response to a short circuit.

=== Self test ===
The self test indicates that the battery and its safety circuit work, that the battery voltage is within an acceptable range, that the battery can supply an 8 A pulse of current, and that the battery will protect itself against a short. The test confirms that the battery pack is new. If a new battery tests used, the supplier should be contacted. In some circumstances, a battery that is stored at a cold temperature could produce a test result that indicates it has been used, even though it holds its full original capacity.

=== "Used" and "depleted" ===
The safety circuit determines that a pack has been used when its voltage falls below a threshold, or if it detects a minimum number of pulses. Testing a pack is not normally sufficient to cause it to become "used", but normal operation should make it "used" around the time 1% of its capacity has been depleted. The safety circuit causes the pack to become "depleted" when it falls below its end-of-life voltage and turns off. A used pack will continue to function normally, but a depleted pack can no longer be used.
