= Baffin Island Current =

Arctic Ocean current

Coordinates: 64.724°N 62.629°W

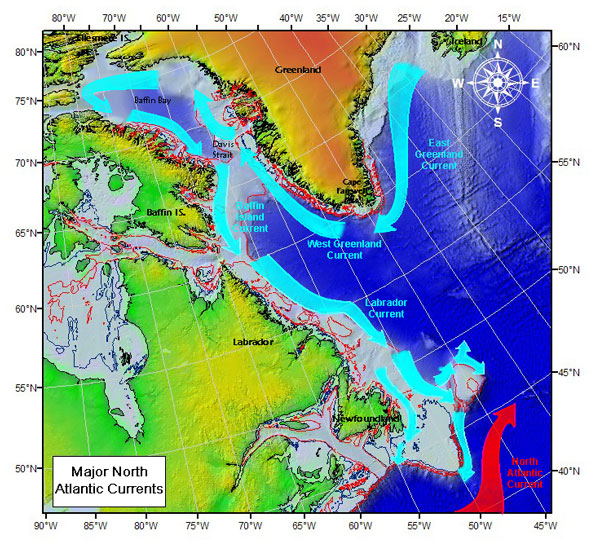
Baffin Island Current

Baffin Island Current (or Baffin Current) is an ocean current running south down the western side of Baffin Bay in the Arctic Ocean, along Baffin Island. Its sources are the West Greenland Current and outflow from the Arctic Ocean. Its speed is approximately 17 km (11 mi) per day.

== See also ==
- Labrador Current
- East Greenland Current
