= Faroe-Bank Channel overflow =

Overflow current from Nordic Seas towards North Atlantic Ocean

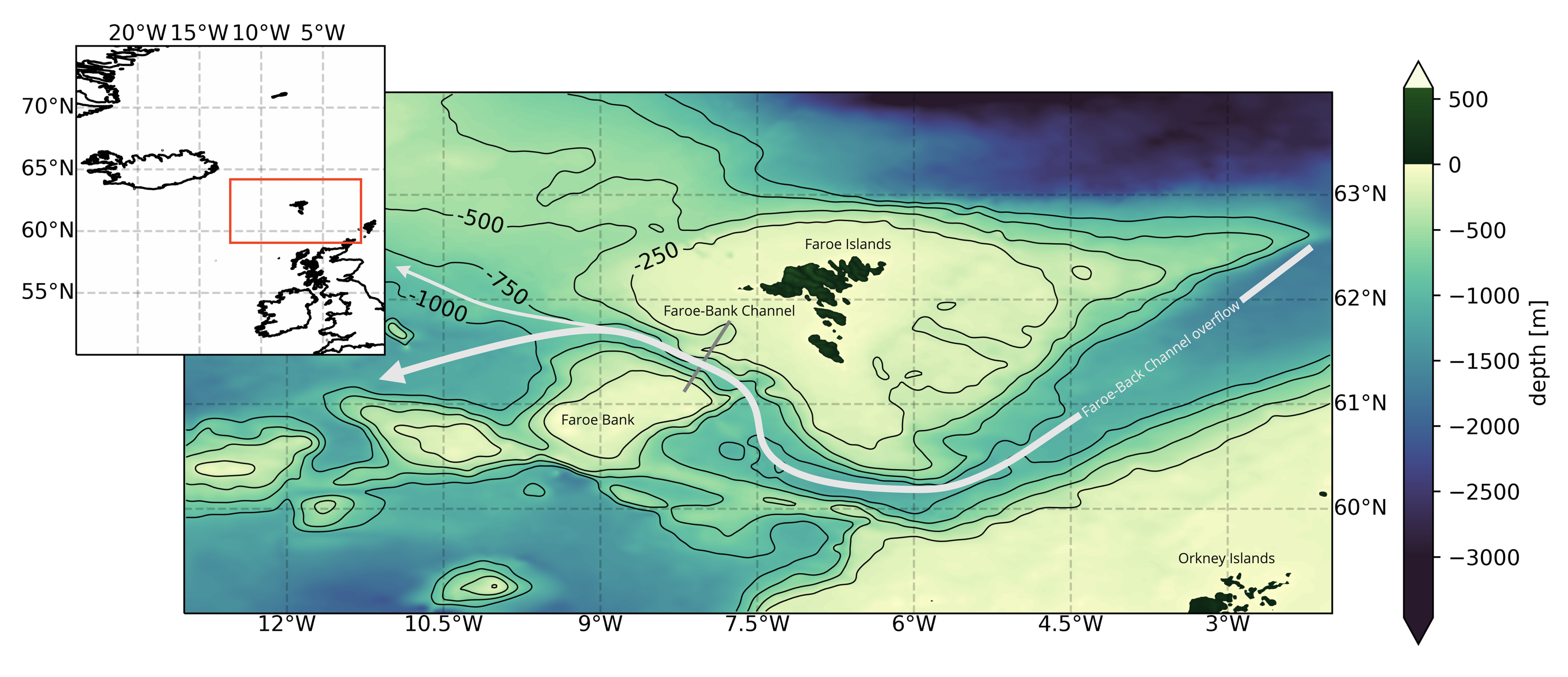
Location of Faroe-Bank Channel, indicating the two different directions of Faroe-Bank Channel overflow. Data retrieved from ETOPO.

Cold and dense water from the Nordic Seas is transported southwards as Faroe-Bank Channel overflow. This water flows from the Arctic Ocean into the North Atlantic through the Faroe-Bank Channel between the Faroe Islands and Scotland. The overflow transport is estimated to contribute to one-third (2.1±0.2 Sv, on average) of the total overflow over the Greenland-Scotland Ridge. The remaining two-third of overflow water passes through Denmark Strait (being the strongest overflow branch with an estimated transport of 3.5 Sv), the Wyville Thomson Ridge (0.3 Sv), and the Iceland-Faroe Ridge (1.1 Sv).

Faroe-Bank Channel overflow (FBCO) contributes to a large extent to the formation of North Atlantic Deep Water. Therefore, FBCO is important for water transport towards the deep parts of the North Atlantic, playing a significant role in Earth's climate system.

== Faroe-Bank Channel ==
The Faroe-Bank Channel (FBC) is a deeply eroded channel in the Greenland-Scotland Ridge (GSR). Its primary sill, located south of the Faroe Islands, has a width of about 15 km and a maximum depth of 840 m, with very steep walls at both sides of the channel. 100 km north-west of this sill, there is a secondary sill with a maximum depth of 850 m. Faroe-Bank Channel overflow enters the FBC from the northeast, turns towards the west between the Faroe Islands and the Faroe Bank, and leaves the GSR in southwestern direction, west-southwest of the Faroe Islands.

== Hydrography ==
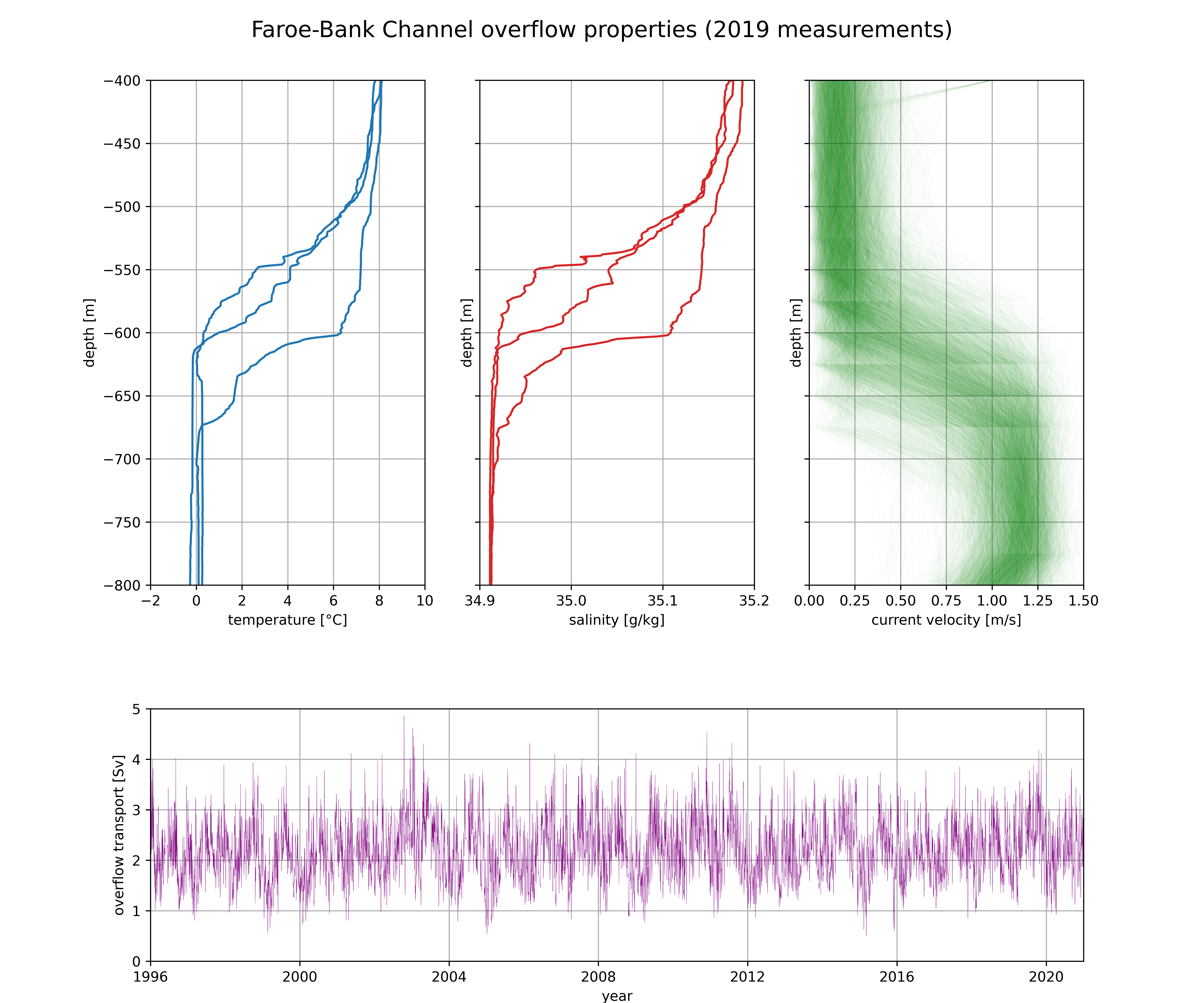
Temperature, salinity (both 2019 vessel cruise measurements) and current speed (2019 ADCP ensemble) profiles, and overflow transport (daily averages since 1996) for the part of the Faroe-Bank Channel where the overflow takes place. Data retrieved from ENVOFAR.

The water flowing over the Greenland-Scotland Ridge through the Faroe-Bank Channel consists of a very well-mixed bottom layer, with a stratified water layer on top. The temperature of this stratified layer can get to 11 °C in the upper 100 m of the channel, with a salinity around 35.1 g/kg; between 100 and 400 m depth the temperature of the water in the stratified layer is around 8 °C, with a salinity of 35.2 g/kg. The water below 400 m, in the well-mixed layer, can be characterised as overflow water.

=== Definition of overflow ===
The mixed bottom layer of the FBC is where the actual overflow takes place, being fed by inflow of cold and fresh North Atlantic Water, Modified North Atlantic Water, Norwegian Sea Deep Water and Norwegian Sea Arctic Intermediate Water. These water masses have different temperatures (between -0.5 and 7.0 °C) and salinities (between 34.7 and 35.4 g/kg). Therefore, it may be complicated to exactly define which water entering the FBC contributes to the actual overflow. Four definitions are possible, two of which depending on the overflow velocity, one depending on the overflow flux, and one depending on the overflow water properties.

The simplest definition is in terms of velocities: water with a velocity in northwestern direction is then termed Faroe-Bank Channel overflow. At the sill, velocities can grow up until 1.2 m/s, accelerating when flowing downwards the deepening bathymetry. In this respect, high velocities are associated with strong mixing and highly turbulent flows. In the stratified layer at the top of the channel, velocities become negative (i.e., in southeastern direction), which makes these water no part of the overflow.

Another option is to take into account the barotropic (i.e., horizontal sea-surface height gradients determine currents) and baroclinic (i.e., horizontal density gradients determine currents) pressure gradients at the overflow depth between both sides of the GSR:
$$\Delta P_{trop} = g\Delta h$$
$$\Delta P_{clin} = g\Delta H \frac{\Delta\rho}{\rho}$$
where $\Delta h$ is the decrease in sea-surface height and $\Delta H$ is the decrease in interface height from upstream areas to the sill. Processes like mixing, circulation and convection contribute to these pressure gradients. The overflow velocity, then, scales as follows with the pressure gradient between the basins north and south of the ridge:

$$v = \sqrt{2\left(\Delta P_{trop} + \Delta P_{clin}\right)}$$
This velocity can then be used to define the total overflow flux in the FBC.

A third definition is so-called kinematic overflow: the water flux from the bottom of the channel up to the interface height, being the level where the velocity in northwestern direction measures one half of the maximum velocity in the profile. The overflow flux is then calculated through
$$Q_{k}(t) = \int_{x_{1}}^{x_{2}} v_{0}(x,t) \left(h_{0}(x,t) -
h_{B}\right) \operatorname{d}\!x + \int_{x_{1}}^{x_{2}} q_{B}\left(x,t\right)\operatorname{d}\!x$$
where $v_{0}$ is the average profile velocity, $h_{0}$ is the interface height, $h_{B}$ is the height of the layer below the lowest measurement station in the channel, and $q_{B}$ is the volume flux per unit width of the channel.

Lastly, overflow can also be defined on the basis of hydrographical properties: namely as water that flows through the FBC having a temperature lower than 3 °C, or having a potential density higher than 27.8 kg/m^{3}. This definition is most often used when estimating values for the magnitude of the FBCO.

=== Periodicity ===
Temperature and salinity profiles as well as current speeds in the FBC vary strongly on a day-to-day basis. The dense water forms domes that move through the channel with a period of 2.5 to 6 days. At the ocean surface, this periodicity can be observed in the form of topographic Rossby waves at the sea surface, which are caused by mesoscale oscillations in the velocity field. The resulting eddies are the consequence of baroclinic instabilities within the overflow water, which then induce the observed periodicity.

On a greater timescale, atmospheric forcing also causes periodic changes in the FBCO. When the atmospheric circulation governing the Nordic Seas is in a cyclonic (anticyclonic) regime, the source of the deep water predominantly comes via a western (eastern) inflow path, and the FBCO will be weaker (stronger). The eastern inflow path is called the Faroe-Strait Channel Jet. This transition from a cyclonic to an anticyclonic regime takes place on an interannual timescale, but the atmospheric forcing also shows a seasonal cycle. During summer the weakened cyclonic winds are associated with a higher FBCO transport. This indicates a fast barotropic response to the wind forcing.

== Outflow ==
Faroe-Strait Channel Jet water is much colder than the water flowing into the Faroe-Bank Channel via its western entrance path. Within the FBC, water always flows along its eastern rather than its western boundary, regardless the different inflow pathways from the Nordic Seas. Moreover, at times the eastern inflow path is dominant, overflow waters are denser and higher in volume.

After passing the primary Faroe-Bank Channel sill, the overflow bifurcates into two different branches that both flow with a maximum velocity of 1.35 m/s on top of each other. The average thickness of the total outflow plume along its descent is 160±70 m, showing a high lateral variability, and yields a transport of ~1 Sv per branch. A transverse circulation actively dilutes the bottom branch of the plume. The shallow, intermediate branch transports warmer, less dense outflow water along the ridge slope towards the west. This branch mixes with oxygen-poor, fresh Modified East Icelandic Water. The deep (deeper than 1000 m) branch transports the most dense, cold water towards the deep parts of the North Atlantic. This branch entrains warmer and more saline water, mixes, and consequently obtains higher temperatures and salinity. Both branches ultimately contribute to the formation of North Atlantic Deep Water.

== North Atlantic overturning ==
The Atlantic meridional overturning circulation (AMOC) is important for Earth's climate because of its distribution of heat and salinity over the globe. The strength of the Faroe-Bank Channel overflow is an important indicator for the stability of the AMOC, since the overflow produces dense waters that contribute for a large extent to the total overturning in the North Atlantic. Parameters that can effect the AMOC are kinematic overflow (i.e., the magnitude of the overflow transport) and overflow density (as the AMOC being a density-driven circulation). In this respect, density characteristics of the overflow could vary even if the kinematic overflow does not.

=== Measurements ===
From 1995 onwards, FBCO has been monitored by a continuous Acoustic Doppler current profiler (ADCP) mooring, measuring volume transport, hydrographic properties and the density of the overflow. The kinematic overflow, derived from the velocity field, showed a non-significant positive linear trend of 0.01±0.013 Sv/yr between 1995 and 2015, whereas the coldest part of the FBCO warmed in that same period with 0.1±0.06 °C (which made density decrease), causing increasing transport of heat into the AMOC. This warming, however, is accompanied by an observed salinity (and therefore density) increase, which results in no net change in density.

=== Model simulations ===
Climate models have shown an overall decreasing trend in the baroclinic component of the overflow between 1948 and 2005; the barotropic pressure gradient, however, shows an increasing trend of equal magnitude. These processes compensate each other; as a result the pressure difference at depth does not show a significant trend over time.

Global inverse modelling, ocean hydrographic surveys, chlorofuorocarbon (CFC) inventories, and monitoring of the AMOC from 2004 to present have shown that the AMOC has slowed down in the past decades. As explained, density of FBCO waters did not significantly change in that time period, so changes in FBCO cannot (fully) explain the changes in the AMOC.

== See also ==
- Atlantic meridional overturning circulation
- Nordic Seas
- Mesoscale ocean eddies
