= West Spitsbergen Current =

Warm, salty current that runs poleward just west of Spitsbergen

The West Spitsbergen Current transport relative warm and saline water into the Arctic Ocean.

The West Spitsbergen Current (WSC) is a warm, salty current that runs poleward just west of Spitsbergen, (formerly called West Spitsbergen), in the Arctic Ocean. The WSC branches off the Norwegian Atlantic Current in the Norwegian Sea. The WSC is of importance because it drives warm and salty Atlantic Water into the interior Arctic. The warm and salty WSC flows north through the eastern side of Fram Strait, while the East Greenland Current (EGC) flows south through the western side of Fram Strait. The EGC is characterized by being very cold and low in salinity, but above all else it is a major exporter of Arctic sea ice. Thus, the EGC combined with the warm WSC makes the Fram Strait the northernmost ocean area having ice-free conditions throughout the year in all of the global ocean.

== Horizontal movement ==
The WSC has a unique structure as it flows poleward off the western coast of Spitsbergen. It is easiest to discuss horizontal movements and vertical movements of the WSC, separately. The WSC begins its movement in the Norwegian Sea where it branches off the Norwegian Atlantic Current and arrives at Spitsbergen's western coast, where it is guided by the bathymetric profile of the ocean floor surrounding Svalbard. Specifically, it tends to follow along steep continental shelves. The current is quite narrow and strong, having a width of roughly 100 kilometers and a maximum speed of 35 cm/s. At about 80° North latitude the WSC splits into two different sections, the Svalbard branch and the Yermak Branch. The Svalbard Branch continues to follow the continental shelf northeastward, and eventually sinks to an intermediate depth and is cyclonically recirculated throughout the Arctic, eventually being pushed out through the East Greenland Current. The Yermak Branch moves northwesterly till about 81°N, and then it moves directly westward and eventually equatorward in the Return Atlantic Current. The Return Atlantic Current is directly east of the East Greenland Current. The high salinity and warm temperatures of the Return Atlantic Current compared to the cold temperatures and low salinities of the EGC contribute to the existence of the East Greenland Polar Front a result of the strong gradient in both salinity and temperature. There is a current that splits off from the Yermak Branch and flows towards the Northeast at a higher latitude. This current is not well understood in the literature, and thus more information is needed. It is believed this current loops back into the Svalbard Branch further along in its track eastward.

== Vertical movement ==
After the WSC splits off from the Norwegian Atlantic Current it begins to enter very cold atmospheric conditions. The cold atmosphere is able to cool the surface water, and in some instances this water cools so much that some of the WSC water actually sinks due to its density increase, all the while holding its salinity constant. This is one element of the formation of the Lower Arctic Intermediate Water. As the current continues to move northward and reaches the continental shelf of western Svalbard it begins to encounter sea-ice. The sea-ice melts due to the warmth of the WSC, and thus a surface layer of very freshwater begins to exist. Winds mix the freshwater and the warm salty water of the WSC mix, creating some Arctic Surface Water. This Arctic Surface Water is now less dense than the Atlantic Water in the WSC and thus the WSC begins to sink underneath the Arctic Surface Water. At this point the WSC is still relatively warm and very saline. Thus, this allows the Atlantic Water in the WSC to be completely isolated from the surface waters.

After the current splits into the Svalbard Branch and the Yermak Branch, the general sinking process described above still continues in the Svalbard Branch. However, in the Yermak Branch the WSC is not able to penetrate deep inside the Arctic Ocean because the zone it enters has very strong tidal mixing. This allows the Atlantic Water to mix with the Polar Waters, creating more of a homogeneous mixture of relatively warm and moderately saline water. This extends down to about 300 meters which is recognized as the bottom depth of the Return Atlantic Current. For the Svalbard Branch, the Atlantic Water core of the WSC continues to sink as it meets more and more freshwater on its eastern route. It sinks fairly quickly to a depth greater than 100 meters by the time it reaches the Barents Sea because in Northern Svalbard there is quite a lot of freshwater run-off from fjords which adds to a deeper, less dense Arctic Surface Water and thus a deeper WSC. By the time this water recirculates to the Beaufort Gyre, the Atlantic core of the WSC is 400 to 500 meters deep. Unlike the Yermak Branch and the Return Atlantic Current, the Svalbard Branch is able to retain a strong Atlantic Water chemical signal whereas the Yermak Branch and the Return Atlantic Current carry a very weak Atlantic Water signal. The Atlantic Water core temperature is a direct reflection of the depth of the Svalbard Branch of the WSC.

If the WSC encounters a significant amount of ice along the continental shelves of Spitsbergen, then the WSC advancing poleward will sink much faster, due to a greater amount of freshwater melt from the increased sea-ice. The ability to sink faster means more of the heat content of the WSC will be preserved and not lost to the atmosphere or surrounding waters and thus warmer waters will be transported into the Arctic. This could have profound impacts on sea-ice melting.

== Properties ==
The temperature of the WSC is highly variable. It often depends on atmospheric conditions which are highly variable in their own right. In general, however, the warmest core temperature of the Atlantic Water in the WSC is around 2.75 °C near Svalbard to 2.25 °C near Franz Josef Land to 1.0 °C north of the new Siberian Islands. Salinity in this warm core is often greater than 34.95 psu. Ocean temperature values for the beginning of the WSC are typically between 6 and 8 °C with salinities between 35.1 and 35.3 psu.

== Mass transport ==
Water mass transport in the WSC at around 78.83° North varies strongly on an annual time scale. Fahbrach et al. showed that the maximum volume transport (~20 sverdrups) occurred in February and the minimum volume transport occurred in August (~5 sverdrups). One big issue in deriving these mass volume transports is the fact that in some areas of the WSC there exist counter-currents, which make it difficult to gauge how much volume is actually being transported.

== Current research ==
Current research on the WSC focuses in on two areas: heat content and methane gas release. It has been well documented that the Atlantic Water core temperature associated with the WSC has increased by almost 1 °C in recent years. It has also been well documented that the Atlantic Water core temperature decreases as you move cyclonically around the Arctic. Thus, this means that heat is being lost to the surrounding water. As the temperature of the water is increased, more heat will be lost to the surrounding water as the WSC tracts around the Arctic Ocean. If the heat flux out of the Atlantic Water core in the WSC is vertically upward then that would lead to warming of the Arctic Surface Water and the melting of more Arctic Sea Ice. Thus, this current topic is of high interest because an increase of heat flux out of the AW core will result in more Arctic Sea Ice melting.

The second major topic being looked at is how this warming will affect methane gas release in the ocean seabed along the continental margins in West Spitsbergen. There exists these gas hydrate stability zones where a small fluctuation in temperature could dissociate these hydrates and release methane gas bubbles that rise to the surface and are released into the atmosphere.

== See also ==
- Ocean current
- Oceanic gyres
- Physical oceanography
- Fram Strait
- Arctic Ocean
- Whalers Bay
