= Norwegian Trench =

Elongated depression in the sea floor off the southern coast of Norway

Norwegian Trench

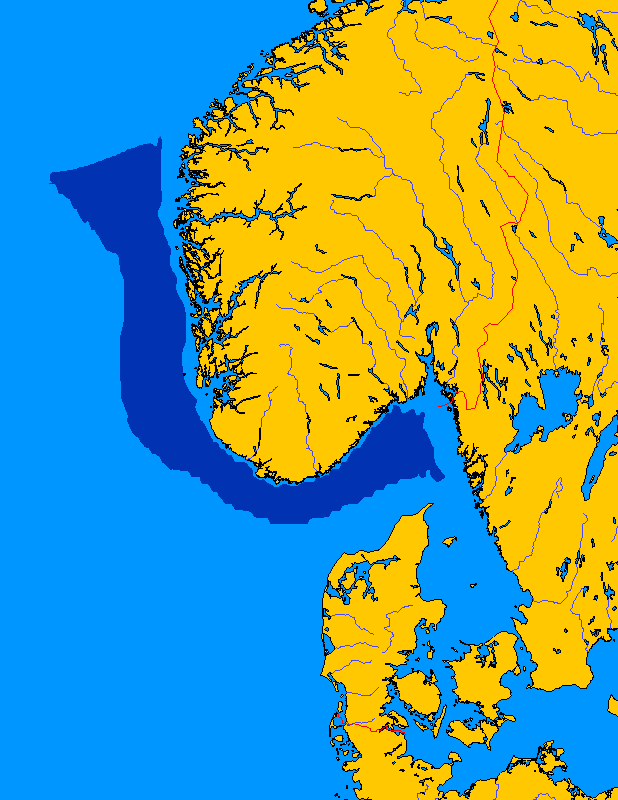
The Norwegian Trench

The Norwegian Trench or Norwegian channel (Norwegian: Norskerenna; Danish: Norskerenden; Swedish: Norska rännan) is an elongated depression in the sea floor off the southern coast of Norway. It reaches from the Stad peninsula in Vestland county in the northwest to the Oslofjord in the southeast. The trench is between 50 and 95 kilometres (31 and 59 miles) wide and up to 700 metres (2,300 ft) deep. Off the Rogaland coast it is 250–300 metres (820–980 ft) deep, and its deepest point is off Arendal where it reaches 700 metres (2,300 ft) deep – an abyss compared to the average depth of the North Sea, which is about 100 metres (330 ft).

== Geology ==
It was formed during the last 1.1 million years by the effects of erosion associated with repeated ice stream activity. The trench is not a subduction-related oceanic trench, where one tectonic plate is being forced under another. The Norwegian Trench was created by fluvial erosion processes during the later Tertiary age. Pleistocene glaciers and ice sheets further deepened the trench. During the main glaciations, the Skagerrak Trough was the meeting point for ice from southeastern Norway, southern Sweden and parts of the Baltic causing a relatively fast-moving ice stream that passed south of the Norwegian coast and then turned north, eventually reaching deepwater at about 62°N. The material carried by the ice stream was then deposited in the North Sea fan. Glacial erratics such as flint and rhomb porphyry, thought to originate from the Skagerrak and Oslo areas respectively, and deformed glacial tills found on the coast of Jæren provide the main onshore evidence for the Norwegian Channel Ice Stream.

== Effect on currents ==
The Norwegian Current generally flows northeasterly along the Norwegian trench. The depth of the trench, along with density differences between Norwegian current water and the adjacent Atlantic Water, results in large-scale eddies. The Norwegian trench region in the Skagerrak is a biologically productive zone, as upwelling of North Atlantic water in the Skagerrak provides an input of nutrients.

== Chemical weapons dumping ==
After World War II, chemical weapons were dumped in the Norwegian Channel, when 36 ships were sunk there by allies with approval from the Norwegian authorities.

== Oil and gas pipelines ==
The trench is an obstacle for oil and gas pipelines.
