= Whalers Bay (Svalbard) =

Bay in Svalbard, Norway

Whaler's Bay is located where the word Svalbard is written in this figure.

Whaler's Bay is a bay in Svalbard in the Arctic Ocean.

The former whaling grounds to the north of Nordaustlandet (roughly 81°N 10°E), the second largest island of the Svalbard archipelago are called Whaler's Bay and the bowhead whale has been abundant in this region. The West Spitsbergen Current (WSC) transports salt and internal energy through Fram Strait into Whaler's bay. Oceanographic field-studies suggest that the waters on the surface are mainly influenced by atmospheric cooling. Other studies claim that the warm temperature correlates with the sea ice extent in this area.
