= Norwegian Current =

Current that flows northeasterly along the Atlantic coast of Norway

Coordinates: 67°N 3°E

The Norwegian Current (also known as the Norway Coastal Current) is one of two dominant arctic inflows of water. It can be traced from near Shetland, north of Scotland, otherwise from the eastern North Sea at depths of up to 100 metres. It finally passes the opening into the Barents Sea, a large outcrop of the Arctic Ocean. Compared to its partial source the North Atlantic Current (which otherwise loops into the East Greenland Current) it is colder and less salty; the other sources are the less saline North and Baltic seas and the Norwegian fjords and rivers. It is considerably warmer and saltier than the Arctic Ocean, which is freshened by precipitation and ice in and around it. Winter temperatures in the flow are typically between 2 and 5 °C — the co-parent North Atlantic flow, a heat remnant of its Gulf Stream chief contributor, exceeds 6 °C.

Norwegian coastal waters are dominated by two main water masses, water from the Norwegian Coastal Current and water from the North Atlantic Drift (Atlantic water). As the Norwegian Coastal Current moves northward, water from the North Atlantic Drift is mixed in, raising the salinity (see § Salinity).

The current is both wind-driven, "piling up" of water along the Norwegian coast by southwesterly winds (creating elevation and thus pressure differences), and also driven by its salinity distribution which in turn creates density gradients.

North Atlantic Current (red) and Norwegian Current (orange)

== Sources ==
It is composed primarily of outflow from the Baltic Sea (50% of its freshwater input) through the Skagerrak into the North Sea (10% of its freshwater input) circulation, joining with a fraction of the North Atlantic Drift (the western turn of the northward Gulf Stream). The current is seasonally affected but on average has inputs of fjords and rivers of Norway being 40% of its freshwater input. Northwest of the Skagerrak (the access to the Baltic) the current has about 2100 m³/s of freshwater, 75% of which is Baltic outflow, 15% North Sea outflow and 10% runoff from Norway and Sweden. It is thus seen from a saline osmotic pressure viewpoint as a continuation of the Baltic Current and means relatively less salty ocean water than would intuitively be expected counterbalances the naturally non-saline precipitation and ice melt topping up the Arctic Sea (and the outcrop of the Barents Sea). The current uses the Norwegian Trench picking up fresh and brackish water. It is a surface current – it flows along the top 50–100 metres.

As the current moves north-northeast, saltier water from the North Atlantic Drift joins (see § Salinity).

== Properties ==
=== Salinity ===
The Norwegian Coastal Current is a wedge-shaped current that has varying salinity and temperature characteristics, and thus densities. The volume of freshwater inputs is greatest in the summer months and smaller during the winter months, contributing to the variability in salinity. On average, it has a salinity of about 34.5 psu (ppt); the near coastal waters have a slightly lower salinity (32-31 psu), the current's boundary to the North Atlantic Drift is marked by a slightly higher salinity, 35 ppt.

=== Temperature ===
The average winter temperature of the Norwegian Coastal Current is about 3.5 °C and ranges from 2 to 5 °C, while in summer the temperature of the current is warmer as the tributary sources (Baltic Sea, Norwegian fjords, rivers) are warmed up.

=== Velocity ===
Although there is much variability in the current's velocities, ranging from as little as 20 cm/s to 100 cm/s at its maximum it is characterized by a velocity of 30 cm/s.

== Effects on climate ==
A mechanism of exchange of energy between the atmosphere and the surface waters of the Atlantic Ocean, Norwegian Coastal Current, is very important to the climate of Norway.

In the winter time, there is a release of heat from the ocean to the overlying air masses. These air masses generally flow in the direction of north-east, thereby warming the adjacent land masses (Norway); especially the coastal regions.

In the summer, the effect is actually reversed. Warm air masses (heated by the Sun on long days) above the Atlantic Ocean will transfer heat to the underlying cooler ocean. This results in cooler air masses reaching the Scandinavian Peninsula, thereby cooling it down in the summer months, especially the coastal regions.

Hence, the Atlantic Ocean and the nearby coastal waters have a moderating effect on the extremes of temperature in Norway, making (especially the coastal regions) warmer in the winter and cooler in the summer. The same effect is very pronounced at Iceland.

To a slight extent, the Norwegian Coastal Current is conveying warmer water into the Barents Sea, decreasing the amount of ice that will form there. In this perspective, the effect of the North Atlantic Drift is much larger.

=== Fisheries effects ===
The current brings nutrient rich water along the coast of Norway, and with it rich fisheries of cod, herring, and capelin. Wind driven upwelling along the Strait of Skagerrak brings abundant nutrients to the surface which are then carried along the coastline. Norway has one of the biggest fishing industries in the world, harvesting an average of 3 million metric tons of fish each year. The Norwegian coast is also an important spawning ground for many of the commercial fishes.

=== Global climate change ===
The 1990s was an exceptional decade for interannual climate variations in Norway.

The temperatures were, on average, warmer, producing wet, warm winters and hot summers in Norway. This has led to increased precipitation extremes, and changes in fish stocks.

Increased atmospheric temperatures due to global climate change cause strong south westerly winds to pile water up along the Norwegian coast. The pressure difference creates storm surges that have increased coastal flooding in recent years.

Temperatures have also been rising in the deep layers of Norwegian coastal waters.

Increasing temperatures cause a decrease in sea ice that is supplying the Norwegian Sea with greater amounts of freshwater and lowering the salinities overall.

This decrease in salinity could cause changes in the rate at which (Arctic) bottom water form (through the process of sea ice formation and the sinking of the highly saline by-product excluded when sea ice forms). If the rate of the formation of (Arctic) bottom water is slowed, then the entire inward flow of the North Atlantic Drift to the Arctic Ocean may be slowed down.

Additionally, increased warming of the North Atlantic Drift is a much larger contributor to the inhibition of formation of sea ice in the Arctic, than the contribution from the Norwegian Coastal Current. Hence, the impact of the Norwegian Coastal Current on climate change is relatively small.

== See also ==
- Ocean current
- Norwegian trench
