= Mooring (oceanography) =

Collection of devices, connected to a wire and anchored on the sea floor

Mooring as deployed in Fram Strait with top buoy, a CTD-sensor, two rotor current meters, acoustic release and train wheels as anchor.

A mooring in oceanography is a collection of devices connected to a wire and anchored on the sea floor. It is the Eulerian way of measuring ocean currents, since a mooring is stationary at a fixed location. In contrast to that, the Lagrangian way measures the motion of an oceanographic drifter, the Lagrangian drifter.

== Construction principle ==
The mooring is held up in the water column with various floats, such as glass ball and syntactic foam floats. The attached instrumentation is wide-ranging but often includes conductivity, temperature, depth sensors (conductivity, temperature, and depth sensors), current meters (e.g. acoustic Doppler current profilers or deprecated rotor current meters), and biological sensors to measure various parameters. Long-term moorings can be deployed for durations of two years or more, powered with alkaline or lithium battery packs.

== Components ==
=== Top buoy ===
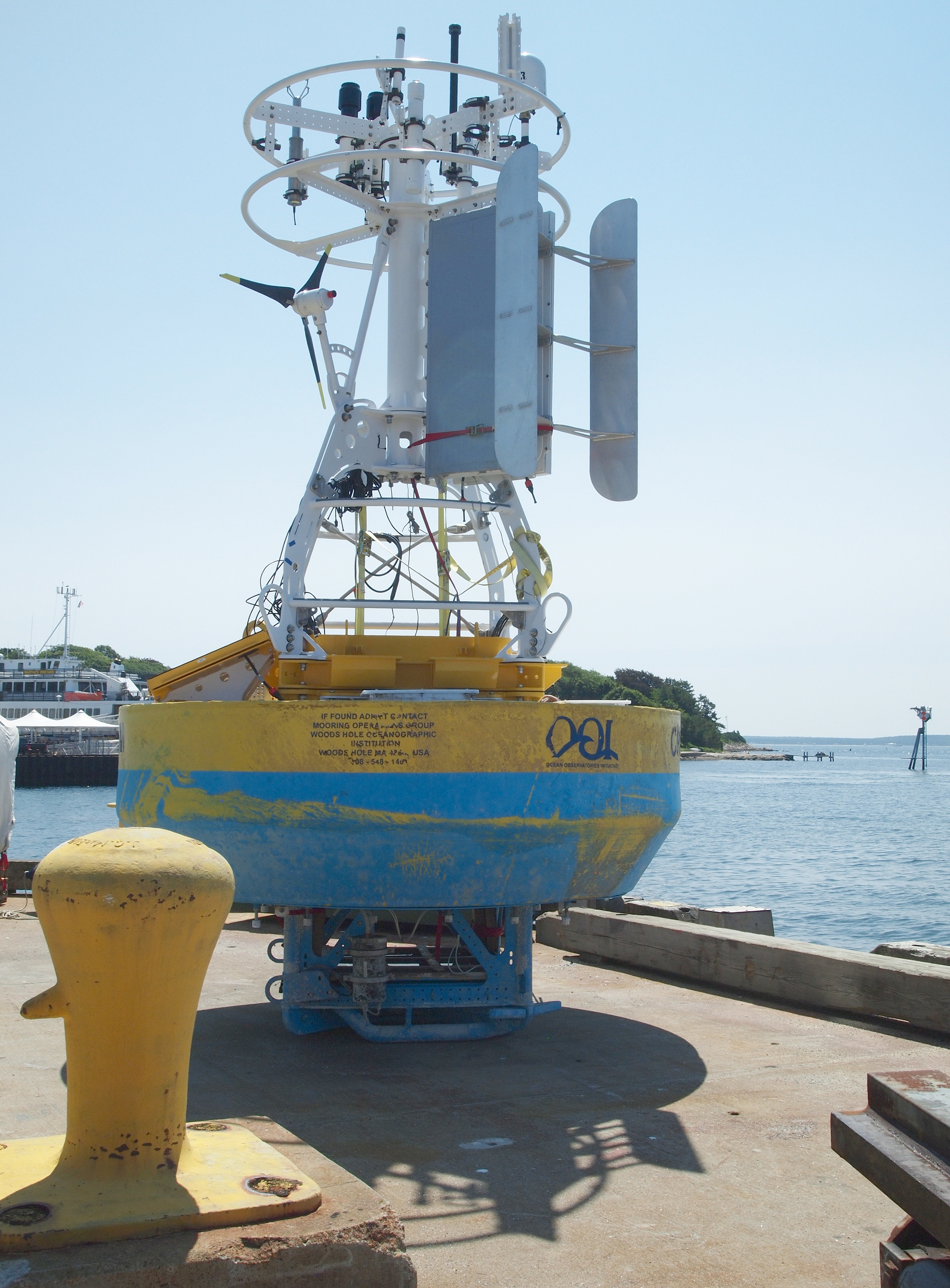
WHOI moored surface buoy with meteorological sensors and satellite transmitters

==== Surface buoys ====
Moorings often include surface buoys that transmit data in real time. The conventional approach is to use the Argos System. Alternatively, some use the commercial Iridium satellite system, which allows higher data rates.

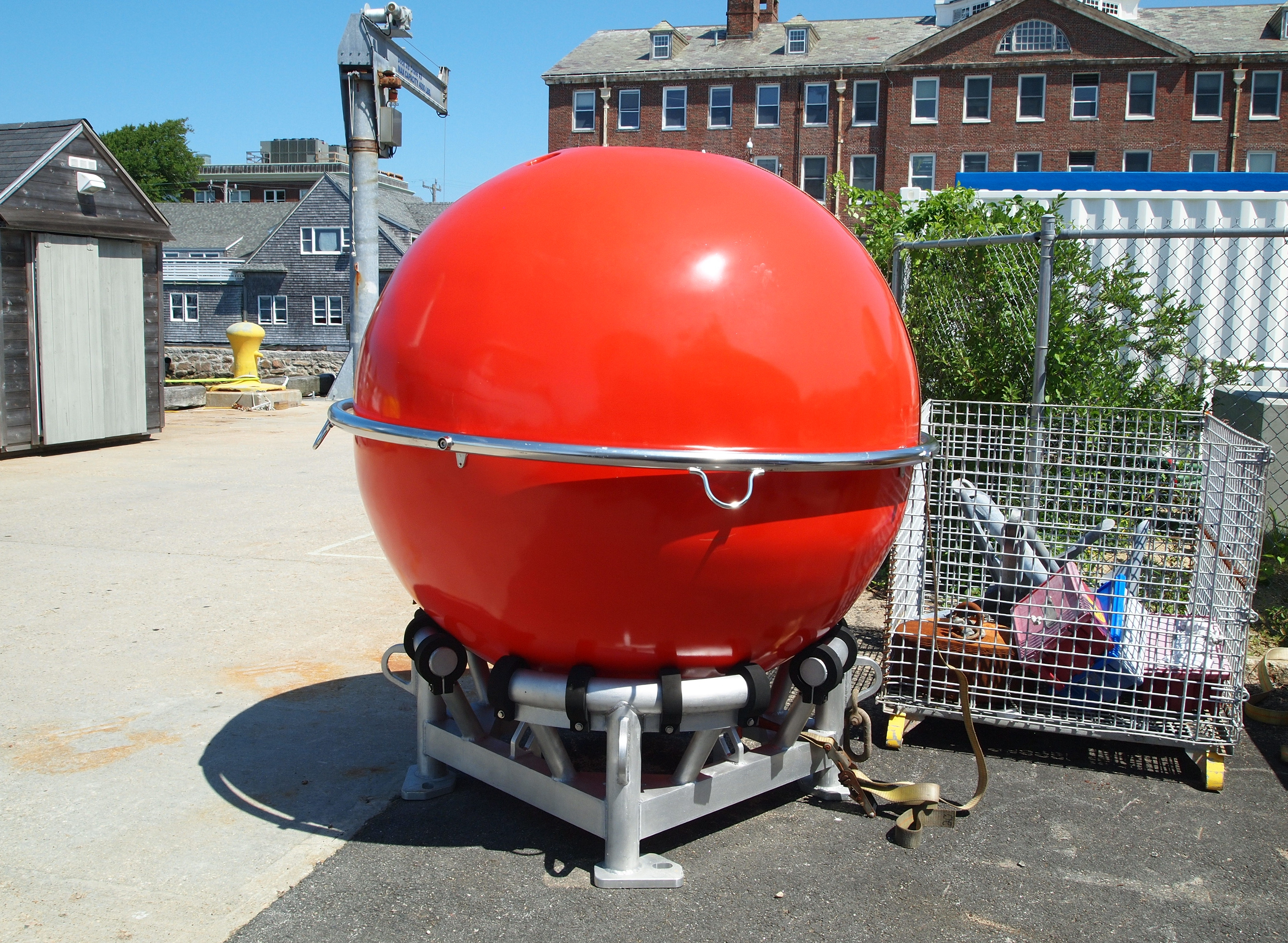
Syntactic foam sphere used as a subsurface float

==== Submerged buoys ====
In deeper waters, areas covered by sea ice, areas within or near shipping lanes and areas that are prone to theft or vandalism, moorings are often submerged with no surface markers. A submerged mooring typically uses an acoustic or timed release connecting to an anchor weight on the sea floor. With the former, the anchor is detached from the rest of the system when the release receives a coded acoustic command signal, leaving the anchor on the floor. Deep-water anchors are typically made from steel and may be as massive as 100 kg. A common deep-water anchor consists of a stack of two to four railroad wheels. In shallow waters an anchor may be a concrete block or commercially produced small anchor.

The buoyancy of the floats, i.e. of the top buoy plus additional packs of glass bulbs of foam, is sufficient to carry the instruments back to the surface. In order to avoid entangled ropes, it has been practical to place an additional float directly above each instrument.

=== Instrument housing ===
==== Profiling crawlers ====
Profiling crawlers, or prawlers, are sensor bodies which climb and descend the cable to observe at multiple depths. The energy to move is "free" in the sense that wave energy is harnessed to move the prawler upwards by ratcheting, and prawler simply falls downward with gravity.

== Depth correction ==
Similar to a kite in the wind, the mooring line will follow a (half-)catenary curve. The influence of currents (and wind if the top buoy is above the sea surface) can be modeled, and the shape of the mooring line can be determined by software. If the currents are strong (above 0.1 m/s) and the mooring lines are long (more than 1 km), the instrument position may vary up to 50 m.

== See also ==
- Benthic lander, a mooring which does not have any mooring line
