= West Greenland Current =

Weak cold water current that flows to the north along the west coast of Greenland

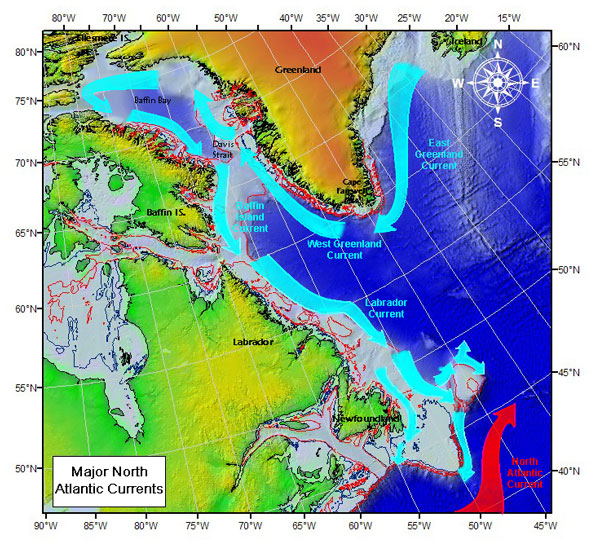
West Greenland Current

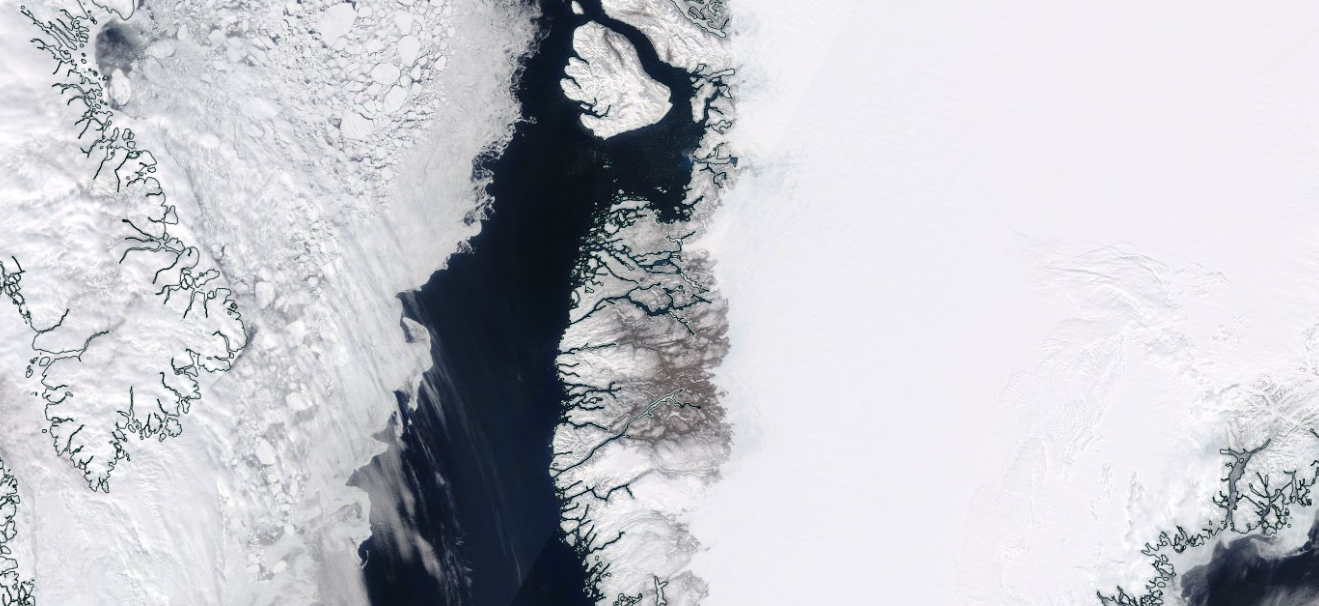
The West Greenland Current, south of Disko Island, leaves the western coast of Greenland free from ice, making it suitable for human settlements

The West Greenland Current (WGC) is a weak cold water current that flows to the north along the west coast of Greenland. The current results from the movement of water flowing around the southernmost point of Greenland caused by the East Greenland Current.

According to Lloyd et al., 2007, the WGC is a WARM current connected to a broader scale North Atlantic climate via the combined influences of Atlantic water from the Irminger Current (IC) and polar water from the East Greenland Current.

Paleoclimatology records derived from foraminifera abundance show that periodic influxes of warm subsurface temperatures and near-bottom temperatures occurred throughout the Late Holocene epoch, particularly during the Holocene climatic optimum. The increased flow from the nearby East Greenland Current was associated with increased glacial iceberg calving from the large Jacobshavn Isbræ glacial outlet within the western Greenland Ice Sheet, causing rapid melting and destabilization events. Following the Neoglaciation, the Jacobshavn outlet formed a floating ice tongue around 2000 years before present.

== See also ==
- Labrador Current
- Baffin Island Current
- Gulf Stream
- Jacobshavn Isbræ
- Ocean current
- Oceanic gyres
- Physical oceanography
