= Current meter =

Device for measuring the flow in a water current

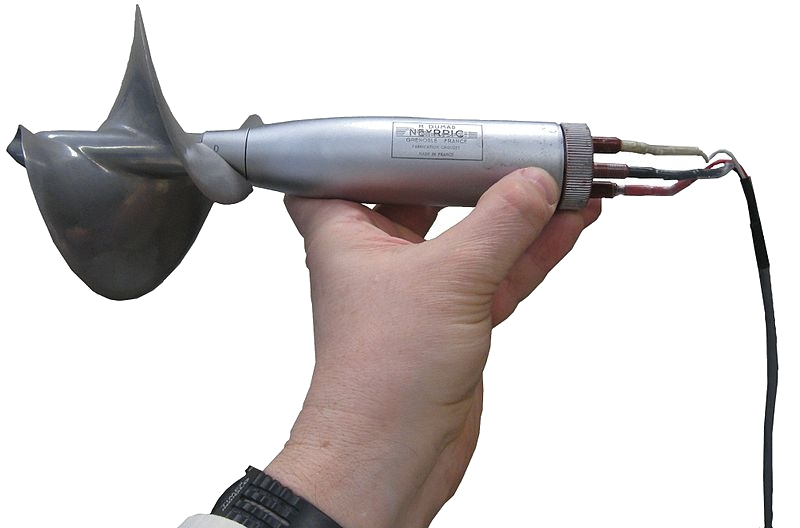
Propeller-type current meter. The revolutions of the propeller per time interval are counted electronically.

A current meter is an oceanographic device for flow measurement by mechanical, tilt, acoustical or electrical means.

== Different reference frames ==
In physics, one distinguishes different reference frames depending on where the observer is located, this is the basics for the Lagrangian and Eulerian specification of the flow field in fluid dynamics: The observer can be either in the Moving frame (as for a Lagrangian drifter) or in a resting frame.

- Lagrangian current meters measure the displacement of an oceanographic drifter, an unmoored buoy or a non-anchored ship's actual position to the position predicted by dead reckoning.
- Eulerian current meters measure current passing a resting current meter.

== Types ==
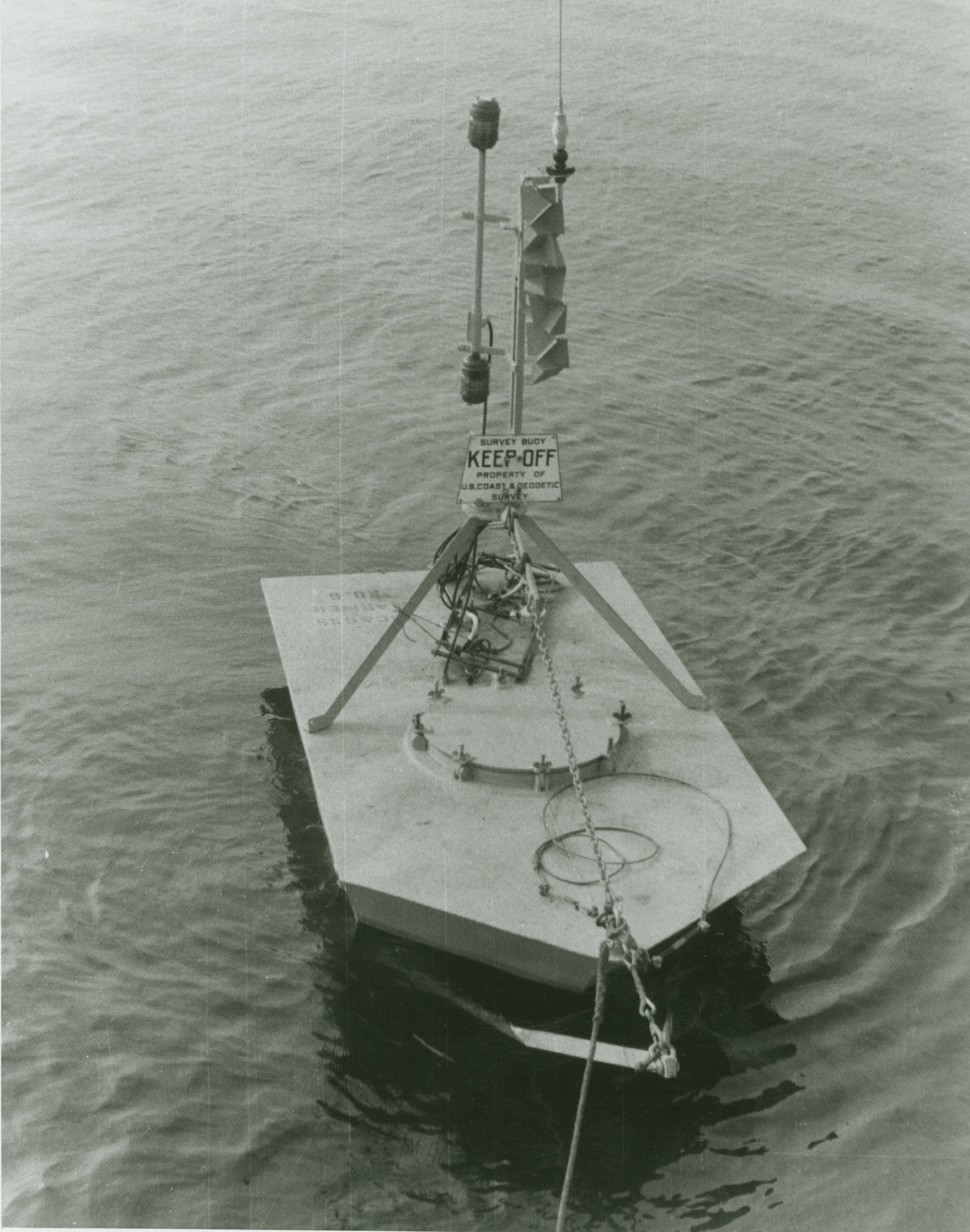
A buoy deploying a Roberts radio current meter, c. 1960

=== Mechanical ===
Mechanical current meters are mostly based on counting the rotations of a propeller and are thus rotor current meters. A mid-20th-century realization is the Ekman current meter which drops balls into a container to count the number of rotations. The Roberts radio current meter is a device mounted on a moored buoy and transmits its findings via radio to a servicing vessel. Savonius Current meters rotate around a vertical axis in order to minimize error introduced by vertical motion.

=== Acoustic ===
There are two basic types of acoustic current meters: Doppler and Travel Time. Both methods use a ceramic transducer to emit sound into the water.

Doppler instruments are more common. An instrument of this type is the Acoustic Doppler current profiler (ADCP), which measures the water current velocities over a depth range using the Doppler effect of sound waves scattered back from particles within the water column. The ADCPs use the traveling time of the sound to determine the position of the moving particles. Single-point devices use again the Doppler shift, but ignoring the traveling times. Such a single-point Doppler Current Sensor (DCS) has a typical velocity range of 0 to 300 cm/s. The devices are usually equipped with additional optional sensors.

Travel time instruments determine water velocity by at least two acoustic signals, one up stream and one down stream. By precisely measuring the time to travel from the emitter to the receiver, in both directions, the average water speed can be determined between the two points. By using multiple paths, the water velocity can be determined in three dimensions.

Travel time meters are generally more accurate than Doppler meters, but only record the velocity between the transducers. Doppler meters have the advantage that they can determine the water velocity at a considerable range, and in the case of an ADCP, at multiple ranges.

=== Electromagnetic induction ===
This novel approach is for instance employed in the Florida Strait where electromagnetic induction in submerged telephone cable is used to estimate the through-flow through the gateway and the complete setup can be seen as one huge current meter. The physics behind: Charged particles (the ions in seawater) are moving with the ocean currents in the magnetic field of the Earth which is perpendicular to the movement. Using Faraday's law of induction (the third of Maxwell's equations), it is possible to evaluate the variability of the averaged horizontal flow by measuring the induced electric currents. The method has a minor vertical weighting effect due to small conductivity changes at different depths.

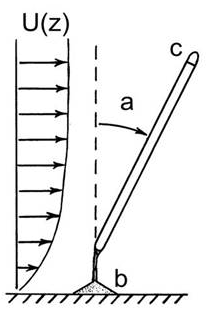
Tilt Current Meter Operating Principle

=== Tilt ===
Tilt current meters operate under the drag-tilt principle and are designed to either float or sink depending on the type. A floating tilt current meter typically consists of a sub-surface buoyant housing that is anchored to the sea floor with a flexible line or tether. A sinking tilt current is similar, but the housing is designed such that the meter hangs from the attachment point. In either case, the housing tilts as a function of its shape, buoyancy (negative or positive) and the water velocity. Once the characteristics of a housing is known, the velocity can be determined by measuring the angle of the housing and direction of tilt. The housing contains a data logger that records the orientation (angle from vertical and compass bearing) of the Tilt Current Meter. Floating tilt current meters are typically deployed on the bottom with a lead or concrete anchor but may be deployed on lobster traps or other convenient anchors of opportunity. Sinking tilt current meters may be attached to an oceanographic mooring, floating dock or fish pen. Tilt current meters have the advantage over other methods of measuring current in that they are generally relatively low-cost instruments and the design and operation is relatively simple. The low-cost of the instrument may allow researchers to use the meters in greater numbers (thereby increasing spatial density) and/or in locations where there is a risk of instrument loss.

== Depth correction ==
Current meters are usually deployed within an oceanographic mooring consisting of an anchor weight on the ground, a mooring line with the instrument(s) connected to it and a floating device to keep the mooring line more or less vertical. Like a kite in the wind, the actual shape of the mooring line will not be completely straight, but following a so-called (half-)catenary. Under the influence of water currents (and wind if the top buoy is above the sea surface) the shape of the mooring line can be determined and by this the actual depth of the instruments. If the currents are strong (above 0.1 m/s) and the mooring lines are long (more than 1 km), the instrument position may vary up to 50 m.

== See also ==
- Stream gauge
