= Labrador Current =

Western North Atlantic Ocean current

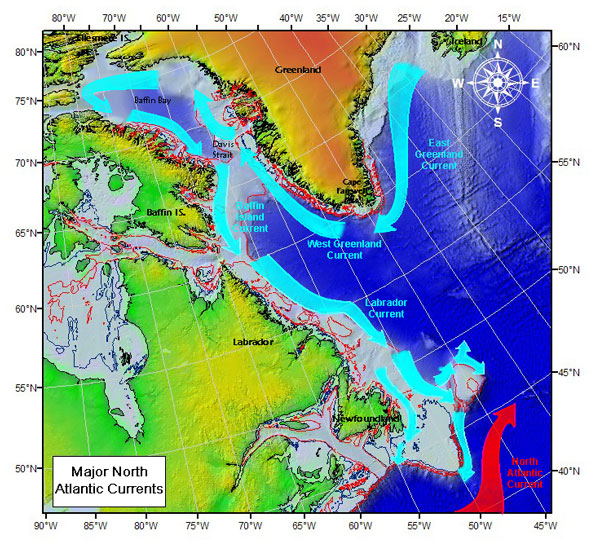
Map of Labrador Current

The Labrador Current is a cold current in the North Atlantic Ocean which flows from the Arctic Ocean south along the coast of Labrador and passes around Newfoundland, continuing south along the east coast of Canada near Nova Scotia. Near Nova Scotia, this cold water current meets the warm northward moving Gulf Stream. The combination of these two currents produces heavy fogs and has also created one of the richest fishing grounds in the world.

In spring and early summer, the Labrador Current transports icebergs from the glaciers of Greenland southwards into the trans-Atlantic shipping lanes. The waters of the current have a cooling effect on the Canadian Atlantic provinces, and on the United States' upper northeast coast from Maine south to Massachusetts. South of Cape Cod, Massachusetts, the Gulf Stream becomes the dominant ocean current.

== Iceberg transport ==
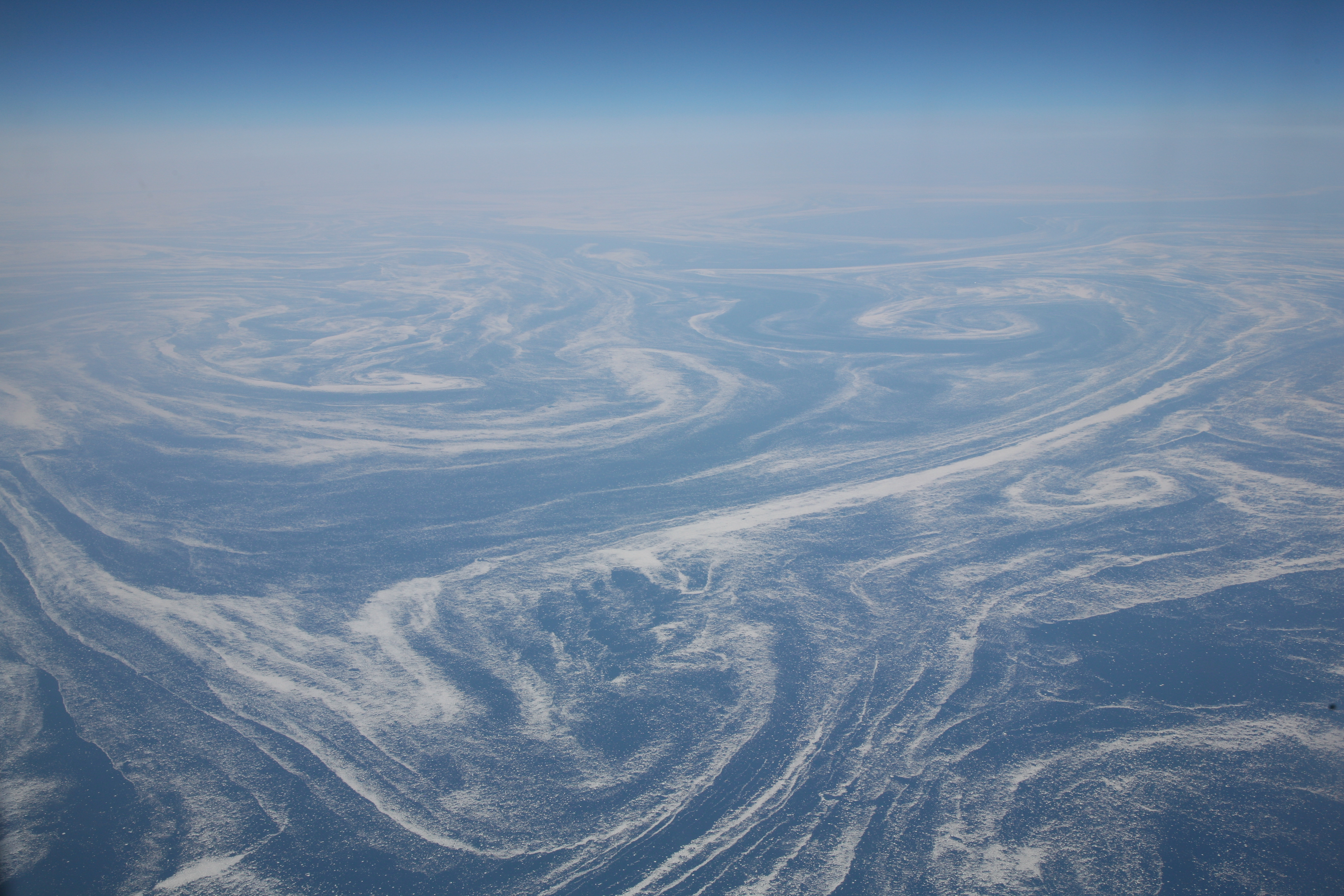
Photo of eddies in the Labrador Current

The Labrador Current has a tendency to sometimes go farther south and/or east than normal. This can produce hazardous shipping conditions, because it can carry icebergs into an area of the Atlantic where they are not usually found. The current has been known to transport icebergs as far south as Bermuda and as far east as the Azores. After the sinking of the Titanic in 1912, the International Ice Patrol was set up to track icebergs, including those found in areas of the ocean where they are rarely located.

== Freshwater origins ==
The Labrador Current has an average annual velocity of 20 cm/s and is formed from very cold water that is around 1.5°C from the Arctic through Baffin Island, Canada, and Western Greenland. These waters come together in the Labrador Sea. The Labrador Sea is affected by seasonality and will experience greater freshwater imports during the late spring and early summer with riverine runoff and glacial melt.

The ocean circulation in the subpolar regions in the North Atlantic have seasonal variations due to the cold, freshwater Labrador Current and the warm, salty North Atlantic Current, as well as with changing surface winds, heat flux, and ice melting and formation. There are two parts that make up the Labrador Current. The first part is baroclinic, meaning that the density depends on temperature and pressure, and is buoyancy-driven due to the amount of freshwater that is imported from the North. The second part of the Labrador Current is deeper and is barotropic, meaning the density is only dependent on pressure, and reaches a depth of about 2500 meters.

Baffin Bay and the Hudson Strait are the largest freshwater contributors to the Labrador Current. The Hudson Strait is a narrow channel that is about 400 km long and is the opening to the Hudson Bay System, which is connected to the Labrador Sea, and contributes 50% of the freshwater transport of the Labrador Current. Hudson Bay is covered in ice in the winter and is ice-free in the summer. Hudson Bay has 42 rivers, contributing to the river runoff. The Labrador Current is made up of the Hudson Strait outflow, or the southeast flow, that meets with the Davis Strait and the West Greenland Current. This current then flows south, down through Newfoundland and Flemish Cap and along the continental shelf break. Part of this current moves westward along the continental slope near Nova Scotia, eventually reaching north of the Gulf Stream, this is called the Slope Water Current. The southward flow joins in the subpolar circulation, forming the narrow, western subpolar gyre in the North Atlantic. The current interacts with the Gulf Stream and the North Atlantic Current forming the western boundary current that makes up this gyre.
