= East Greenland Current =

Current from Fram Strait to Cape Farewell off the eastern coat of Greenland

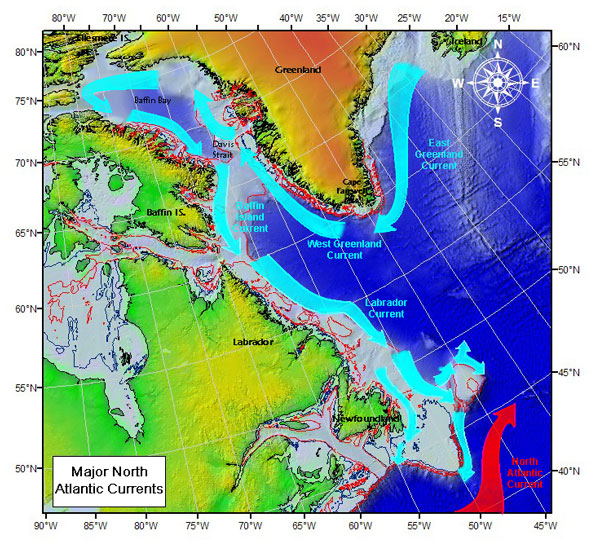
East Greenland Current.

The East Greenland Current (EGC) is a cold, low-salinity current that extends from Fram Strait (~80N) to Cape Farewell (~60N). The current is located off the eastern coast of Greenland along the Greenland continental margin. The current cuts through the Nordic Seas (the Greenland and Norwegian Seas) and through the Denmark Strait. The current is of major importance because it directly connects the Arctic to the Northern Atlantic, it is a major contributor to sea ice export out of the Arctic, and it is a major freshwater sink for the Arctic.

== Water properties ==
The EGC is composed of a mixture of three distinct water masses. The water masses are Polar Water, Atlantic Water, and Deep Water. These water masses can be clearly seen throughout the EGC's tract southward; however, the upper layer water masses do change some due to atmospheric interaction along with inflow from other water sources in the Nordic Seas.

The top 150 meters of the EGC is considered polar water and it is cold and low in salinity. The lowness in salinity has a lot to do with freshwater run off from sea ice melting, river runoff, and Pacific water flux and it is cold due to air-sea interactions while in the Arctic. Typical characteristics for the EGC Polar water are a temperature between 0 °C and –1.7 °C (e.g. freezing point of low-salinity sea water), and the salinity varies greatly from 30 psu (near the surface) to 34 psu at a 150-meter depth. The layer beneath the Polar Water is known as the Atlantic Water layer. It extends down to about 1000 m. This layer is defined as having relatively warm temperatures and saline waters.

The temperatures are normally above 0 °C and have a salinity of 34 psu at 150 meters and it increases to about 35 psu at 1000 meters. The Atlantic water that is seen in the EGC comes from two different sources. The first source of Atlantic Water originates from westward directed Atlantic water in the West Spitsbergen Current. This current sends Atlantic water (AW) into the Fram Strait, and because it is denser than the surface Polar water it sinks to an intermediate depth. The second source of AW in the EGC originates from recirculated AW in the Arctic. This is AW that has entered the Arctic via the North Atlantic and has been circulating in the Arctic and is now being pushed out of the Arctic via the EGC. The layer beneath the Atlantic Water is simply referred to as the Deep Water where the salinity and temperatures are relatively constant. This level typically extends from 1000 meters to the bottom of the ocean. The temperatures in this bottom level are normally below 0 °C and the salinity is around 34.9 psu.

The deep-water masses (>1600 m) are recirculated within the Greenland Sea due to the Jan Mayen fracture zone. Here, the deep water encounters the Jan Mayen Ridge and are deflected eastward towards the interior of the Greenland Sea Gyre. The upper layers are able to pass into the waters north of Iceland unhindered. These recirculated deep-water masses in the Greenland Sea Gyre will be recirculated into the EGC once again in the future near Fram Strait.

== Dynamics ==
The general movement of the EGC is southward along the eastern Greenland continental margin. The currents are quite strong with annual averages of 6–12 cm/s in the upper part of the EGC (<500 m) with inter-annual maximums of 20–30 cm/s. It was estimated in 1991 by Hopkins et al. that the transport of water southward ranged from 2–32 sverdrups. That is quite a large variation that they attributed to the widely varying strength of the Atlantic Water flow at intermediate depths. More recent estimations of water transport in the top layers (<800 m) of the EGC is between 3 and 4 sverdrups.

== Export of Arctic Sea ice ==
One of the most important aspects of the East Greenland Current is the amount of sea ice it exports into the North Atlantic Ocean. It is a major pathway for sea ice to leave the Arctic. It is estimated that more than 90% of the Arctic Sea Ice exported from the Arctic takes place within the East Greenland Current. The volume of ice exported on an annual scale is a strong function of multiple atmospheric variables (wind, temperature, etc.) and oceanic variables and dynamics. There is a maximum of ice-flux export from October through December and a minimum from January to March. This interannual variability occurs because during the summer months the sea ice melts back quite a bit, and it results in a lot of drifting sea ice that can be easily exported through Fram Strait during the windy times of October through December. During the winter months, the sea ice refreezes together and thus the ability to have numerous sea ice drifts decreases due to the increase in overall sea ice extent. Essentially open water drifting decreases substantially during the winter months. The volume export ranges greatly from year to year. It can be as high as 5000 km^{3}/year and as low as 1000 km^{3}/year.

Atmospheric forcings also have a strong impact on Arctic Sea Ice export through the EGC. The North Atlantic Oscillation (NAO)/Arctic Oscillation (AO) has a profound impact on the wind field over the Arctic. During high NAO/AO indexes the cyclonic wind field over the Arctic becomes very strong, this transports more ice out through Fram Strait and into the EGC. During low NAO/AO indexes the cyclonic wind field is quite small and thus the transport out of the Fram Strait diminishes greatly.

== Current research ==
Current research in the EGC is largely focused on freshwater fluxes (in the ocean and also as sea ice). Because the EGC runs through the Greenland Sea and eventually through the Labrador Sea (as the West Greenland Current) it can have strong implications for the strengthening and weakening of deep-water formation in the Greenland and Labrador Seas. The Meridional Overturning Circulation is a density driven circulation in which a small perturbation in the density field could easily slow down or speed up the deep-water formation in the Nordic Seas.

Jones et al. note that there are three different freshwater sources for the EGC: Pacific water, river runoff, and sea-ice meltwater. They find that the biggest contributor to the freshening of the EGC is due to river runoff, followed by Pacific water, and a distant last is sea-ice meltwater (nearly negligible). They find that even though these sources freshen the EGC, these specific sources do not penetrate very well into the central Greenland Sea where the deep convection takes place. They then decide that there must be some other freshwater influence in the central Greenland Sea. They believe it may be from solid sea ice being transported to the central Greenland Sea and then melting. Solid sea ice is very mobile, and winds can easily direct its flow along with ocean currents. Previous thoughts were that the recirculation of the EGC in the Greenland Sea via the Jan Mayen Fracture Zone helps lead to a freshening of the central Greenland Sea, however, Rudels et al. disproved this theory and said it must be due to solid sea ice melt and precipitation in the central Greenland Sea.

== See also ==
- Ocean current – Directional mass flow of oceanic water
- Labrador Current – Western North Atlantic Ocean current
- Baffin Island Current – Arctic Ocean current
- West Greenland Current – Weak cold water current that flows to the north along the west coast of Greenland
- Piteraq – Cold katabatic wind in Greenland
