= Current (fluid) =

Magnitude and direction of flow in a fluid

A current in a fluid is the magnitude and direction of flow within each portion of that fluid, such as a liquid or a gas.

Types of fluid currents include:

- Air current
- Water current
  - Current (hydrology), a current in a river or stream
  - Ocean current
    - Longshore current
    - Boundary current
    - Rip current
    - Rip tide
    - Subsurface currents
      - Turbidity current
    - Tidal current

== See also ==
- Laminar flow
