= Fram Strait =

Passage between Greenland and Svalbard

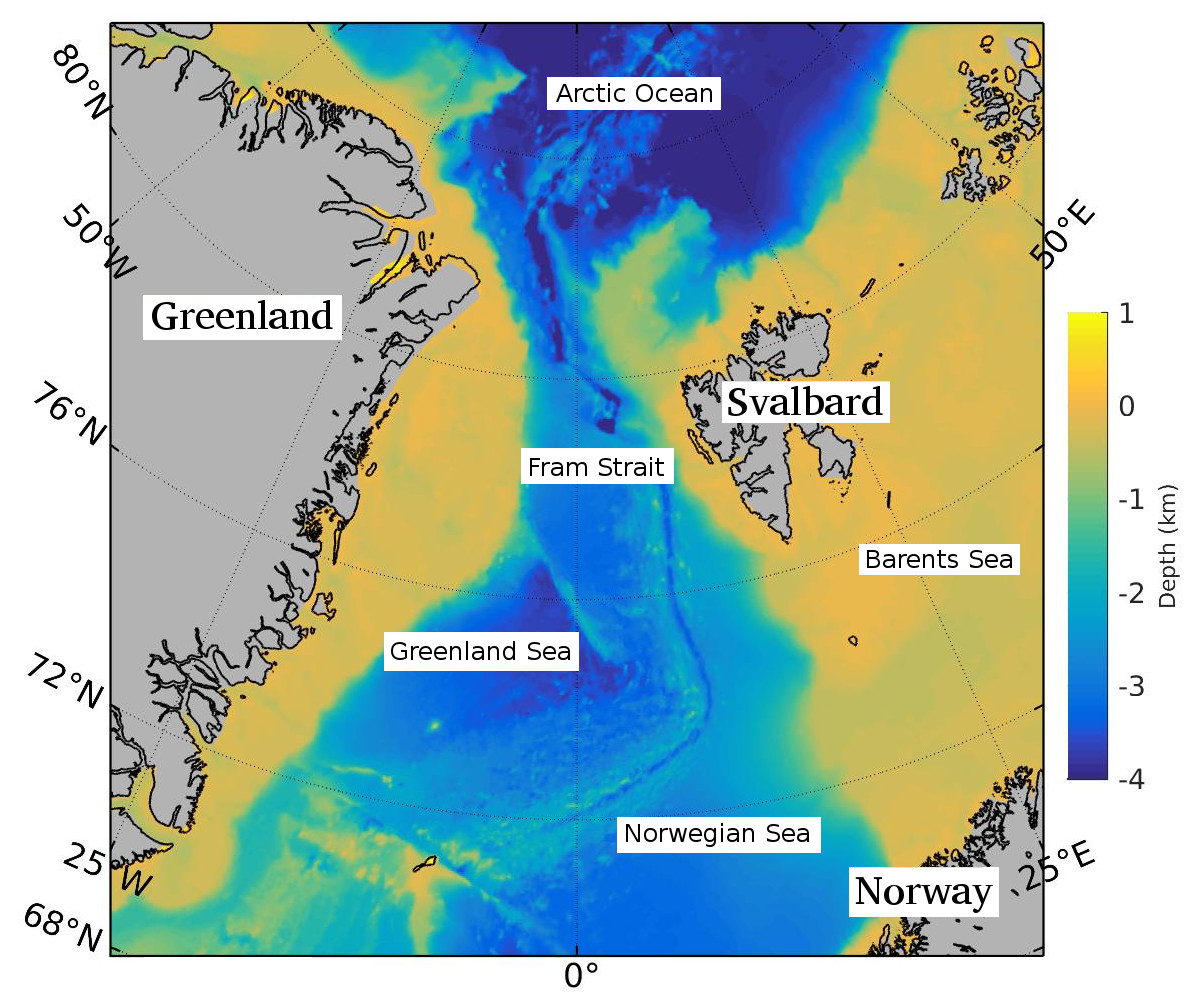
Fram Strait is located between Svalbard and Greenland. It is the only deep passage between the Arctic and World Oceans.

The Fram Strait is the passage between Greenland and Svalbard, located roughly between 77°N and 81°N latitudes and centered on the prime meridian. The Greenland and Norwegian Seas lie south of Fram Strait, while the Nansen Basin of the Arctic Ocean lies to the north. Fram Strait is noted for being the only deep connection between the Arctic Ocean and the World Oceans. The dominant oceanographic features of the region are the West Spitsbergen Current on the east side of the strait and the East Greenland Current on the west.

== Description ==
Fram Strait is the northernmost ocean area having ice-free conditions throughout the year. The width of the strait is about 450 km, but because of the wide continental shelves of Greenland and Spitsbergen, the deep portion of Fram Strait is only about 300 km wide. The ocean over the Greenland continental shelf is often covered with ice.

Within Fram Strait, the sill connecting the Arctic and Fram Strait is 2545 m deep. The Knipovich Ridge, the northernmost section of the Mid-Atlantic Ridge, extends northward through the strait to connect to the Nansen-Gakkel Ridge of the Arctic Ocean. A rift valley, caused by sea-floor spreading, runs adjacent and parallel to the Knipovich Ridge. The Molloy Deep within Fram Strait is the deepest point of the Arctic. This small basin at 79°8.5′N and 2°47′E has a maximum depth of 5,550 m (18,210 ft) ±14 m (46 ft)(See also: Litke Deep). The Yermak Plateau, with a mean depth of about 650 m, lies to the northwest of Spitsbergen.

Historically, Fram Strait was home to a large population of Bowhead whales, then called the Greenland right whale. By mid-17th century, the Svalbard population of Bowhead whales was reduced to near extinction by excessive whaling (See also: Whaling in Spitsbergen; Smeerenburg). Western Fram Strait may be a wintering ground for this critically endangered population.

== Etymology ==
The use of the name "Fram Strait" for the passage between Spitsbergen and Greenland appears to have come into common use in the oceanographic literature in the 1970s. Fram Strait is named after the Norwegian ship Fram. In an 1893 expedition led by Fridtjof Nansen, the Fram drifted for two years across the Arctic before exiting the Arctic through what is now known as Fram Strait. According to glaciologist and geographer Moira Dunbar, an early adopter of the name, the name "Fram Strait" originated in the Russian scientific literature. While in common use, particularly in the oceanographic scientific literature, the name appears to be unofficial.

== Oceanography ==
Fram Strait is the only deep-water connection between the World Oceans and the Arctic. Other gateways are the Barents Sea Opening (BSO), the Bering Strait and various small channels in the Canadian Arctic Archipelago. They are all shallower than Fram Strait, leaving Fram Strait the only route by which deep water can be exchanged between the Atlantic and Arctic Oceans. This exchange occurs in both directions, with specific water masses identified with specific regions flowing between the Oceans. Water with characteristics of the deep Canadian and Eurasian Basins of the Arctic are observed leaving the Arctic in the deep western side of Fram Strait, for example. On the eastern side, cold water from the Norwegian Sea is observed entering the Arctic below the West Spitsbergen Current. In recent years the nature and interactions of these water masses have been changing, symptoms of the changes occurring with the ocean's climate.

=== Current systems ===
Main currents in Fram Strait. The West Spitsbergen Current (red) transports warm and saline water northward. The East Greenland Current (blue) flows southward and transports fresh water (both fluid and sea ice) out of the Arctic Ocean.

Warm, salty water is transported northward from the Atlantic by the West Spitsbergen Current in the east of the strait. The West Spitsbergen Current is the northernmost branch of the North Atlantic Current system. This water forms a water mass called the Atlantic water. The sub-surface flow has a strong seasonality with a minimal volume transport in winter. This current transports internal energy into the Arctic Ocean . The northward velocity is maximum in winter, so the heat transport is highest in winter.

On the west side of the strait, the East Greenland Current flows southward on the Greenland Shelf. The current carries is relatively cold and fresh water out of the Arctic that corresponds to a water mass called Polar water.

The Fram Strait area is located downwind of the Transpolar Drift and therefore covered by multi-year ice in the west of the strait, next to the coast of Greenland. Approximately 90% of sea ice exported from the Arctic is transported by the East Greenland Current. (Sea ice essentially corresponds to fresh water, since its salt content of 4 per mil is much less than the 35 per mil for sea water.) A 2019 estimate states that about "80% of the water exchanged between the Arctic ice cap and the world’s oceans passes through the Fram Strait."

=== Long-time observations ===
The Alfred Wegener Institute for Polar and Marine Research (AWI) and the Norwegian Polar Institute (NPI) have maintained long term monitoring measurements in Fram Strait to obtain volume- and energy-budgets through this choke point. The observations also serve to assess the development of the Arctic Ocean as a sink for terrestrial organic carbon. The AWI=NPI observing array consists of a line of up to 16 moorings across Fram Strait. The mooring line has been maintained since 1997 with a spacing of roughly 25 km. At up to five different depths, the moored array measures the water velocity, temperature, and salinity of the water column.

== Importance for climate ==
Computer simulations suggest that 60 to 70% of the fluctuation of the sea ice flowing through the Fram Strait is correlated with a 6–7 year fluctuation in which the Icelandic Low Pressure system extends eastward into the Barents Sea. The amount of sea ice passing through the Fram Strait varies from year to year and affects the global climate through its influence on thermohaline circulation. The warming in the Fram Strait region has likely amplified Arctic shrinkage, and serves as a positive feedback mechanism for transporting more internal energy to the Arctic Ocean.

In the past century, the sea surface temperature at Fram Strait has on average warmed roughly 1.9 °C (3.5 °F), and is 1.4 °C (2.5 °F) warmer than during the Medieval Warm Period.
