= Tegg =

Tegg is a surname. Notable people with the surname include:

- Rebecca Tegg (born 1985), New Zealand footballer
- Susan Tegg (born 1975), Australian canoeist
- Thomas Tegg (1776–1845), British bookseller and publisher
- William Tegg (1816–1895), English publisher

== See also ==
- Pegg
