= George Harvey =

George Harvey may refer to:

- Sir George Harvey (painter) (1806–1876), Scottish painter
- George Harvey (British politician) (1870–1939), British Conservative MP for Kennington 1924–1929, 1931–1939
- George Harvey (sport shooter) (1878–1958), South African sport shooter
- George Harvey (cricketer) (1885–1962), Australian cricketer
- George Harvey (The Lovely Bones), fictional serial killer in Alice Sebold's 2002 novel The Lovely Bones
- George Brinton McClellan Harvey (1864–1928), American diplomat and journalist
- George Harvey Collegiate Institute, a high school in Toronto, Ontario, Canada
- George Isaac Harvey (1892–?), politician in the Canadian province of Ontario
- George Roy Harvey (1869–1935), American football coach
- George Harvey (American football) (born 1945), American football player
- George U. Harvey (1881–1946), borough president of Queens, New York City
- George Harvey (FRS) (died 1834), mathematician
- George Harvey (RAF officer) (1905–1969), British air marshal

== See also ==
- George Harvie-Watt (1903–1989), British Conservative Party politician
