= Norwegian Sea =

Marginal sea northwest of Norway

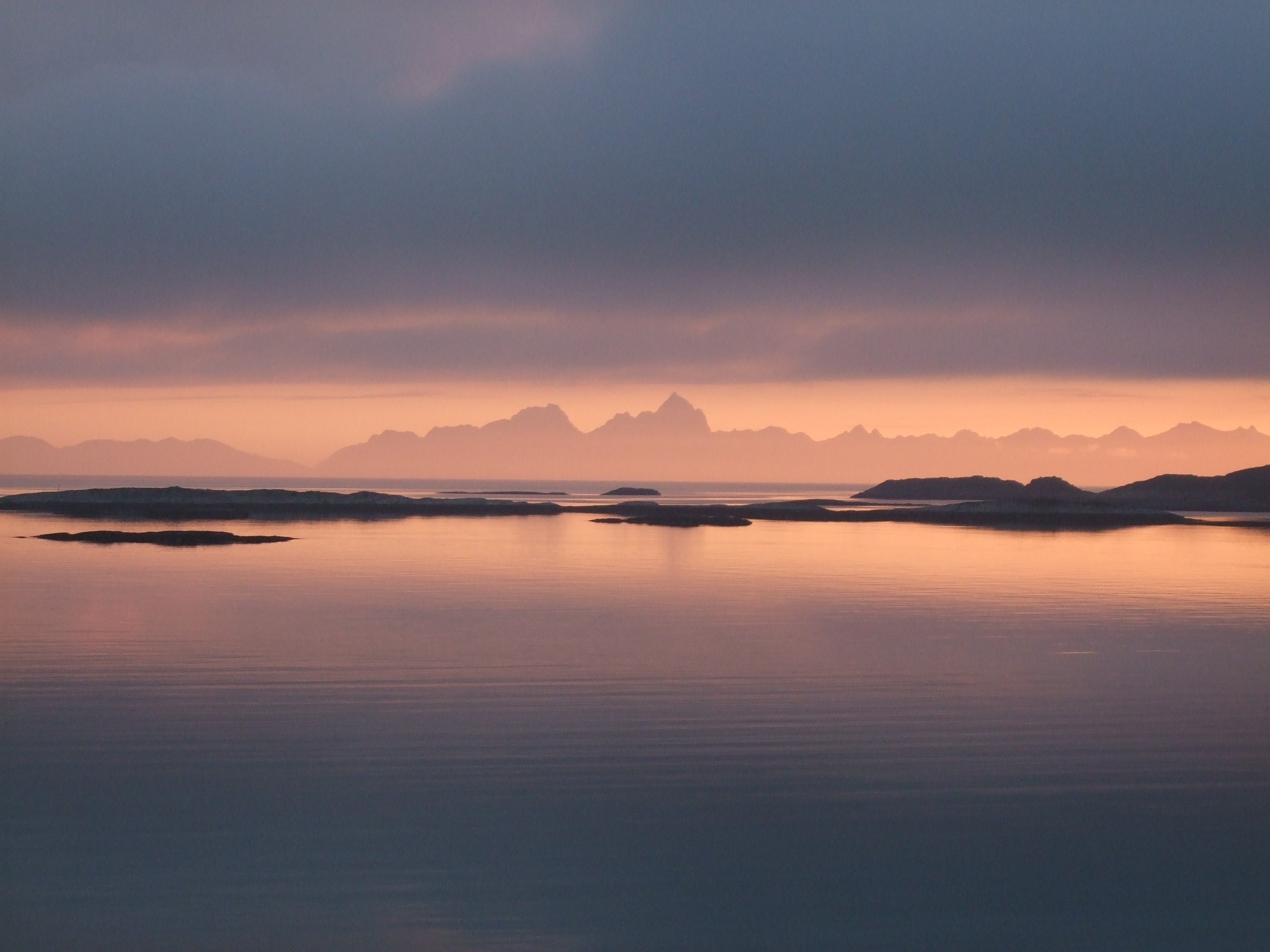
- The Vestfjorden with the mountains of the Lofoten archipelago seen from Løvøy Island in Steigen. Vågakaillen (942 m) is the taller of the two peaks in the centre of the image.
- Interactive map of Norwegian Sea
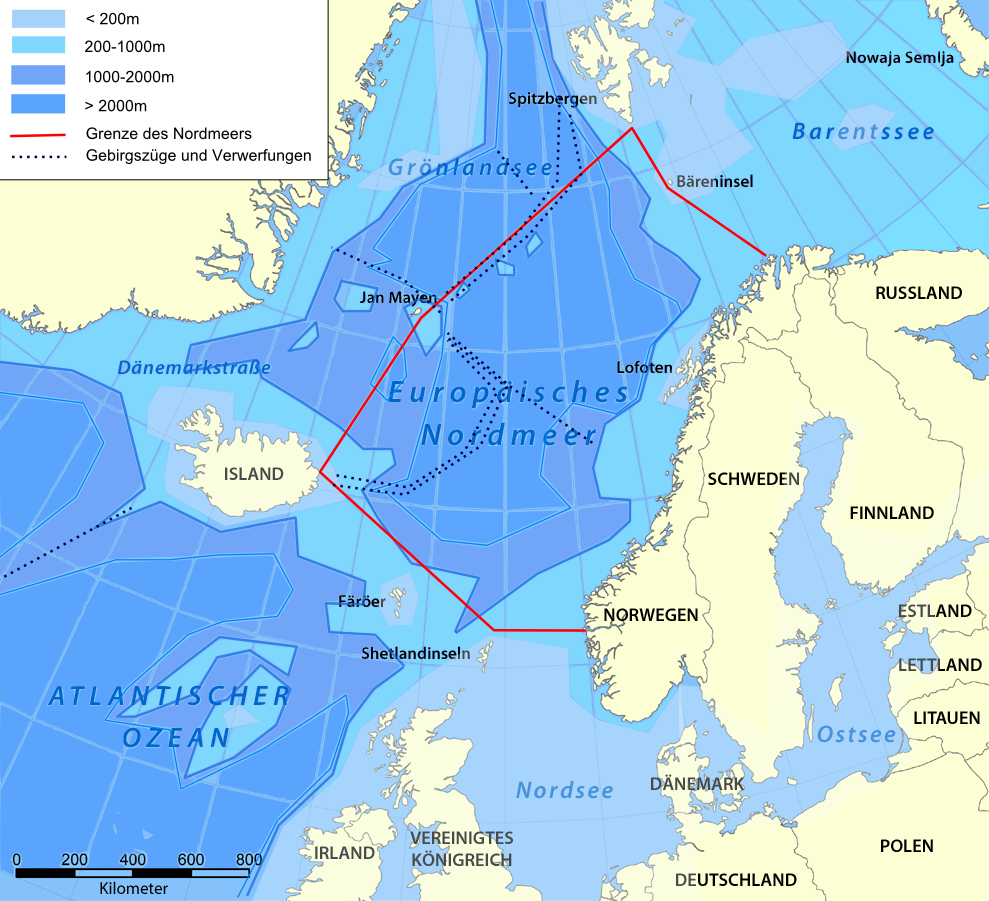
- The Norwegian Sea is outlined in red (Europäisches Nordmeer in German)
- Location: Northern Europe
- Coordinates: 69°N 2°E
- Type: Sea
- Primary inflows: Central North Atlantic, numerous Norwegian fjords
- Basin countries: Iceland, Norway, Denmark (Faroe Island) and United Kingdom (Shetland Island)
- Surface area: 1,383,000 km^{2} (534,000 sq mi)
- Average depth: 2,000 m (6,600 ft)
- Max. depth: 3,970 m (13,020 ft)
- Water volume: 2,000,000 km^{3} (1.6×10^{12} acre⋅ft)

The Norwegian Sea is a marginal sea, grouped with either the Atlantic Ocean or the Arctic Ocean, northwest of Norway between the North Sea and the Greenland Sea, adjoining the Barents Sea to the northeast. In the southwest, it is separated from the Atlantic Ocean by a submarine ridge running between Iceland and the Faroe Islands. To the north, the Jan Mayen Ridge separates it from the Greenland Sea.

Unlike many other seas, most of the bottom of the Norwegian Sea is not part of a continental shelf and therefore lies at a great depth of about two kilometres (1.2 miles) on average. Rich deposits of oil and natural gas are found under the sea bottom and are being explored commercially, in the areas with sea depths of up to about one kilometre (0.6 miles). The coastal zones are rich in fish that visit the Norwegian Sea from the North Atlantic or Barents Sea (cod) for spawning. The warm North Atlantic Current ensures relatively stable and high water temperatures, so that unlike the Arctic seas, the Norwegian Sea is ice-free throughout the year. Recent research has concluded that the large volume of water in the Norwegian Sea with its large heat absorption capacity is more important as a source of Norway's mild winters than the Gulf Stream and its extensions.

== Extent ==
The International Hydrographic Organization defines the limits of the Norwegian Sea as follows:

On the Northeast. A line joining the southernmost point of West Spitzbergen [sic] to North Cape of Bjørnøya (Bear Island), through this island to Cape Bull and thence on to North Cape, Norway (25°45'E).

On the Southeast. The West coast of Norway between North Cape and Cape Stadt (62°10′N 5°00′E).

On the South. From a point on the West coast of Norway in Latitude 61°00' North along this parallel to Longitude 0°53' West thence a line to the NE extreme of Fuglö (62°21′N 6°15′W) and on to the East extreme of Gerpir (65°05′N 13°30′W) in Iceland.

On the West. The Southeastern limit of Greenland Sea [A line joining the southernmost point of West Spitzbergen [sic] to the Northern point of Jan Mayen Island, down the West coast of that island to its Southern extreme, thence a Line to the Eastern extreme of Gerpir (65°05′N 13°30′W) in Iceland].

== Formation and geography ==
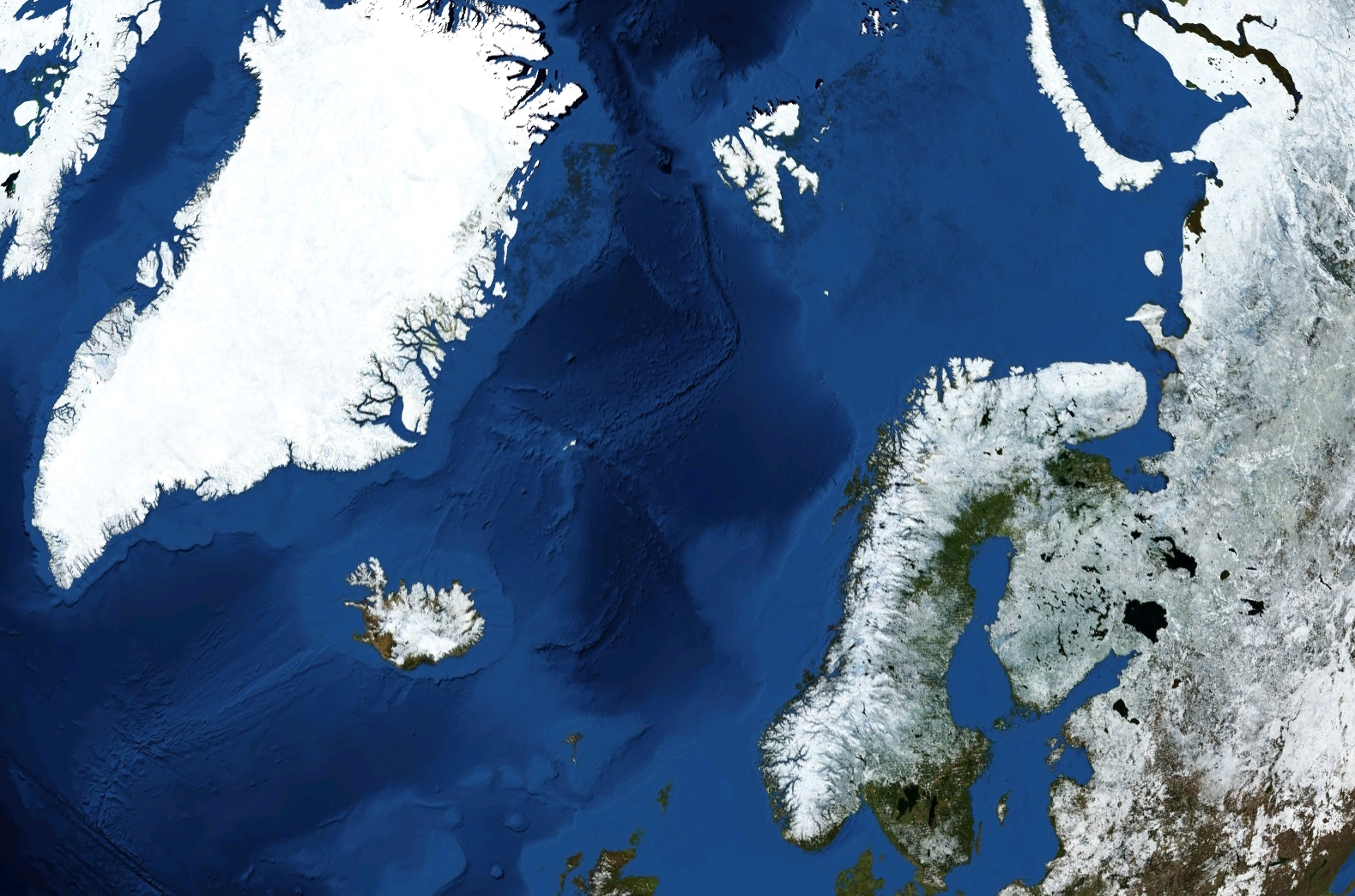
Norwegian Sea, surrounded by shallower seas to the south (North Sea) and northeast (Barents Sea). The white dot near the centre is Jan Mayen, and the dot between Spitsbergen (large island to the north) and Norway is Bear Island.

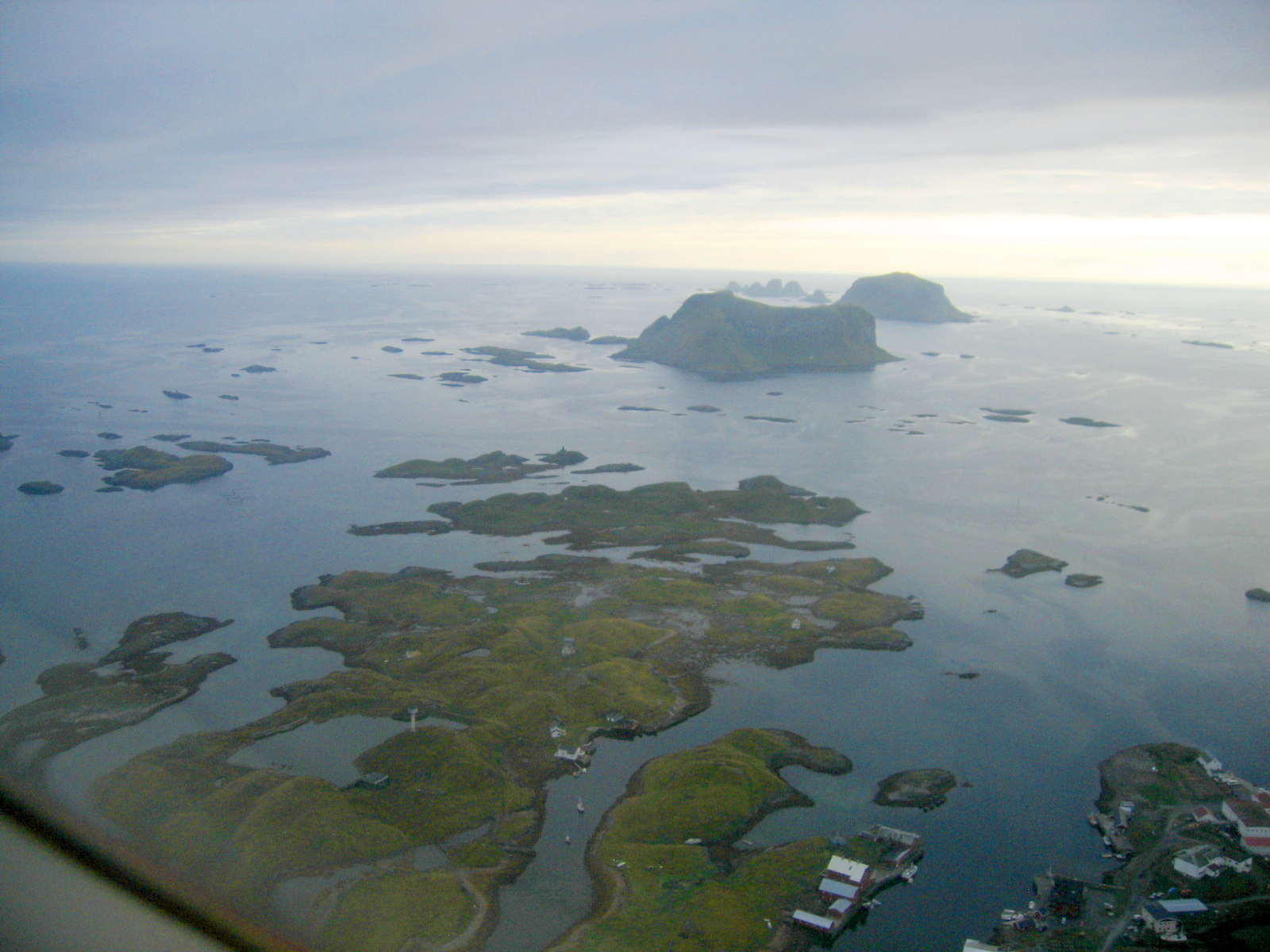
Vedøya, Skumvær and Røst islands, Lofoten, Norway

The Norwegian Sea was formed about 250 million years ago, when the Eurasian Plate of Norway and the North American Plate, including Greenland, started to move apart. The existing narrow shelf sea between Norway and Greenland began to widen and deepen. The present continental slope in the Norwegian Sea marks the border between Norway and Greenland as it stood approximately 250 million years ago. In the north it extends east from Svalbard and on the southwest between Britain and the Faroes. This continental slope contains rich fishing grounds and numerous coral reefs. Settling of the shelf after the separation of the continents has resulted in landslides, such as the Storegga Slide about 8,000 years ago that induced a major tsunami.

The coasts of the Norwegian Sea were shaped during the last ice age. Large glaciers several kilometres high pushed into the land, forming fjords, removing the crust into the sea, and thereby extending the continental slopes. This is particularly clear off the Norwegian coast along Helgeland and north to the Lofoten Islands. The Norwegian continental shelf is between 40 and 200 kilometres (25 and 124 miles) wide, and has a different shape from the shelves in the North Sea and Barents Sea. It contains numerous trenches and irregular peaks, which usually have an amplitude of less than 100 metres (328 feet), but can reach up to 400 metres (1,312 feet). They are covered with a mixture of gravel, sand, and mud, and the trenches are used by fish as spawning grounds. Deeper into the sea, there are two deep basins separated by a low ridge — its deepest point at 3,000 metres (9,843 feet) — between the Vøring Plateau and Jan Mayen island. The southern basin is larger and deeper, with large areas between 3,500 and 4,000 metres (11,483 and 13,123 feet) deep. The northern basin is shallower at 3,200 to 3,300 metres (10,499 to 10,827 feet), but contains many individual sites going down to 3,500 metres (11,483 feet). Submarine thresholds and continental slopes mark the borders of these basins with the adjacent seas. To the south lies the European continental shelf and the North Sea, to the east is the Eurasian continental shelf with the Barents Sea. To the west, the Scotland-Greenland Ridge separates the Norwegian Sea from the North Atlantic. This ridge is on average only 500 metres (1,640 feet) deep, only in a few places reaching the depth of 850 metres (2,789 feet). To the north lie the Jan Mayen Ridge and Mohns Ridge, which lie at a depth of 2,000 metres (6,562 feet), with some trenches reaching depths of about 2,600 metres (8,530 feet).

== Hydrology ==
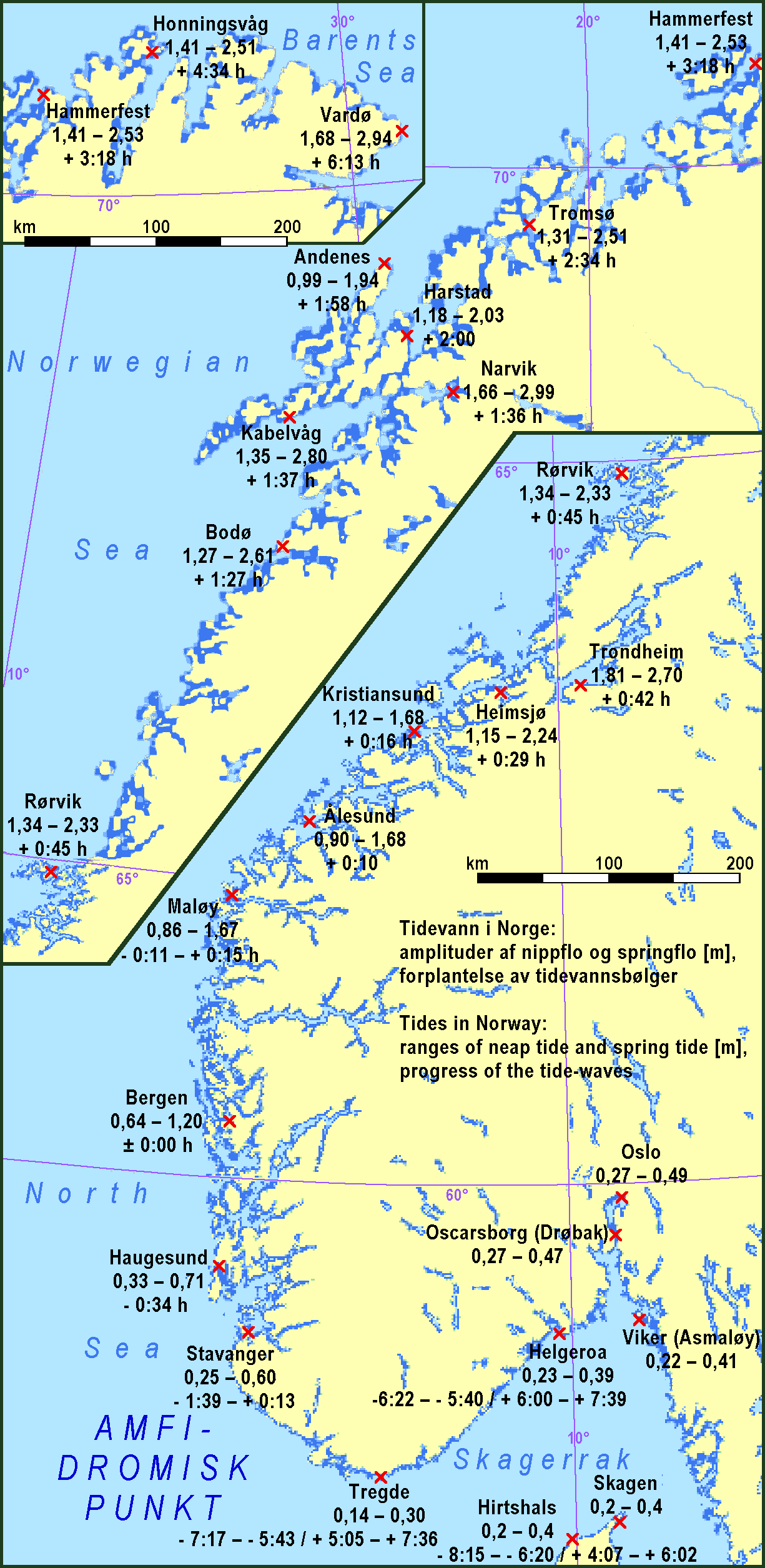
Tide ranges and tide times (hours after Bergen) along the Norwegian coast

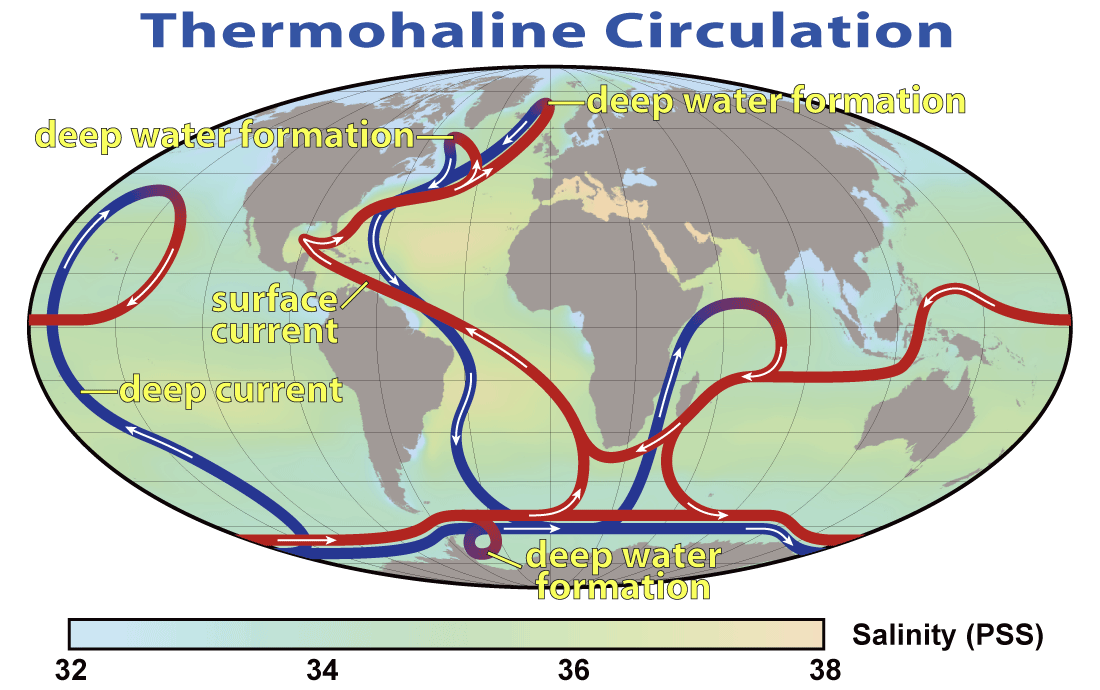
Thermohaline circulation explains the formation of cold, dense deep water in the Norwegian Sea. The entire circulation pattern takes ~2000 years to complete.

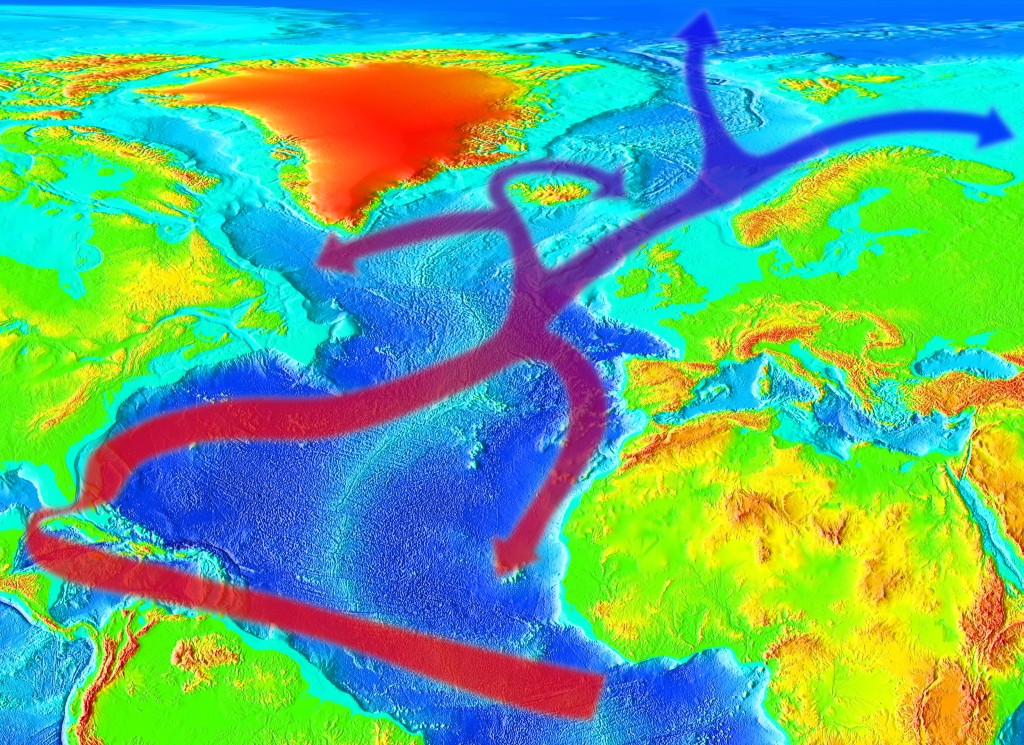
Surface currents in the North Atlantic

Four major water masses originating in the Atlantic and Arctic oceans meet in the Norwegian Sea, and the associated currents are of fundamental importance for the global climate. The warm, salty North Atlantic Current flows in from the Atlantic Ocean, and the colder and less saline Norwegian Current originates in the North Sea. The so-called East Iceland Current transports cold water south from the Norwegian Sea toward Iceland and then east, along the Arctic Circle; this current occurs in the middle water layer. Deep water flows into the Norwegian Sea from the Greenland Sea. The tides in the sea are semi-diurnal; that is, they rise twice a day, to a height of about 3.3 metres (11 ft).

=== Surface currents ===
The hydrology of the upper water layers is largely determined by the flow from the North Atlantic. It reaches a speed of 10 Sv (1 Sv = one million cubic metres per second) and its maximum depth is 700 metres (2,297 feet) at the Lofoten Islands, but normally it is within 500 metres (1,640 feet). Part of it comes through the Faroe-Shetland Channel and has a comparatively high salinity of 35.3‰ (parts per thousand). This current originates in the North Atlantic Current and passes along the European continental slope; increased evaporation due to the warm European climate results in the elevated salinity. Another part passes through the Greenland-Scotland trench between the Faroe Islands and Iceland; this water has a mean salinity between 35 and 35.2‰. The flow shows strong seasonal variations and can be twice as high in winter as in summer. While at the Faroe-Shetland Channel it has a temperature of about 9.5 °C (49.1 °F), it cools to about 5 °C (41 °F) at Svalbard and releases this energy (about 250 terawatts) to the environment.

The current flowing from the North Sea originates in the Baltic Sea and thus collects most of the drainage from northern Europe; this contribution is however relatively small. The temperature and salinity of this current show strong seasonal and annual fluctuations. Long-term measurements within the top 50 metres (164 feet) near the coast show a maximum temperature of 11.2 °C (52.2 °F) at the 63° N parallel in September and a minimum of 3.9 °C (39.0 °F) at the North Cape in March. The salinity varies between 34.3 and 34.6‰ and is lowest in spring owing to the inflow of melted snow from rivers. The largest rivers discharging into the sea are Namsen, Ranelva, and Vefsna. They are all relatively short, but have a high discharge rate owing to their steep, mountainous nature.

A portion of the warm surface water flows directly, within the West Spitsbergen Current, from the Atlantic Ocean, off the Greenland Sea, to the Arctic Ocean. This current has a speed of 3–5 Sv and has a large impact on the climate. Other surface water (~1 Sv) flows along the Norwegian coast in the direction of the Barents Sea. This water may cool enough in the Norwegian Sea to submerge into the deeper layers; there it displaces water that flows back into the North Atlantic.

Arctic water from the East Iceland Current is mostly found in the southwestern part of the sea, near Greenland. Its properties also show significant annual fluctuations, with long-term average temperature being below 3 °C (37 °F) and salinity between 34.7 and 34.9‰. The fraction of this water on the sea surface depends on the strength of the current, which in turn depends on the pressure difference between the Icelandic Low and Azores High: the larger the difference, the stronger the current.

=== Deep-sea currents ===
The Norwegian Sea is connected with the Greenland Sea and the Arctic Ocean by the 2,600-metre (8,530-foot) deep Fram Strait. The Norwegian Sea Deep Water (NSDW) occurs at depths exceeding 2,000 metres (6,562 feet); this homogeneous layer with a salinity of 34.91‰ experiences little exchange with the adjacent seas. Its temperature is below 0 °C (32 °F) and drops to −1 °C (30 °F) at the ocean floor. Compared with the deep waters of the surrounding seas, NSDW has more nutrients but less oxygen and is relatively old.

The weak deep-water exchange with the Atlantic Ocean is due to the small depth of the relatively flat Greenland-Scotland Ridge between Scotland and Greenland, an offshoot of the Mid-Atlantic Ridge. Only four areas of the Greenland-Scotland Ridge are deeper than 500 metres (1,640 feet): the Faroe-Bank Channel (about 850 metres (2,789 feet)), some parts of the Iceland-Faroe Ridge (about 600 metres (1,969 feet)), the Wyville-Thomson Ridge (620 metres (2,034 feet)), and areas between Greenland and the Denmark Strait (850 metres (2,789 feet)) – this is much shallower than the Norwegian Sea. Cold deep water flows into the Atlantic through various channels: about 1.9 Sv through the Faroe Bank channel, 1.1 Sv through the Iceland-Faroe channel, and 0.1 Sv via the Wyville-Thomson Ridge. The turbulence that occurs when the deep water falls behind the Greenland-Scotland Ridge into the deep Atlantic basin mixes the adjacent water layers and forms the North Atlantic Deep Water, one of two major deep-sea currents providing the deep ocean with oxygen.

== Climate ==
The thermohaline circulation affects the climate in the Norwegian Sea, and the regional climate can significantly deviate from average. There is also a difference of about 10 °C (18 °F) between the sea and the coastline. Temperatures rose between 1920 and 1960, and the frequency of storms decreased in this period. The storminess was relatively high between 1880 and 1910, decreased significantly between 1910 and 1960, and then recovered to the original level.

In contrast to the Greenland Sea and Arctic seas, the Norwegian Sea is ice-free year round, owing to its warm currents. The convection between the relatively warm water and cold air in the winter plays an important role in the Arctic climate. The 10 °C (18 °F) July isotherm (air temperature line) runs through the northern boundary of the Norwegian Sea and is often taken as the southern boundary of the Arctic. In winter, the Norwegian Sea generally has the lowest air pressure in the entire Arctic and where most Icelandic Low depressions form. The water temperature in most parts of the sea is 2 to 7 °C (36 to 45 °F) in February and 8 to 12 °C (46 to 54 °F) in August.

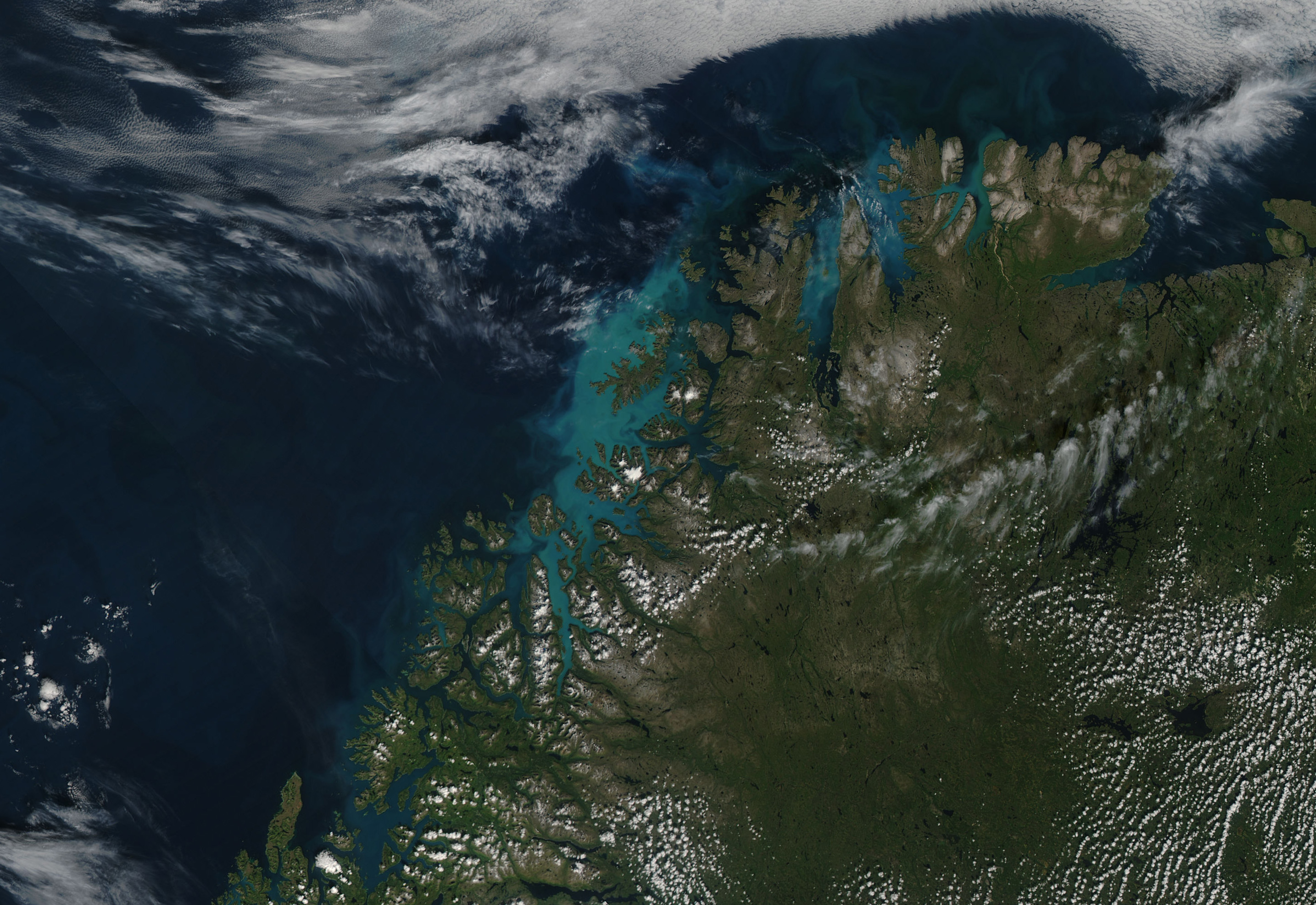
Phytoplankton bloom in the Norwegian Sea.

== Flora and fauna ==
The Norwegian Sea is a transition zone between boreal and Arctic conditions, and thus contains flora and fauna characteristic of both climatic regions. The southern limit of many Arctic species runs through the North Cape, Iceland, and the center of the Norwegian Sea, while the northern limit of boreal species lies near the borders of the Greenland Sea with the Norwegian Sea and Barents Sea; that is, these areas overlap. Some species like the scallop Chlamys islandica and capelin tend to occupy this area between the Atlantic and Arctic oceans.

=== Plankton and sea bottom organisms ===
Most of the aquatic life in the Norwegian Sea is concentrated in the upper layers. Estimates for the entire North Atlantic are that only 2% of biomass is produced at depths below 1,000 metres (3,281 feet) and only 1.2% occurs near the sea floor.

The blooming of the phytoplankton is dominated by chlorophyll and peaks around 20 May. The major phytoplankton forms are diatoms, in particular the genus Thalassiosira and Chaetoceros. After the spring bloom the haptophytes of the genus Phaecocystis pouchetti become dominant.

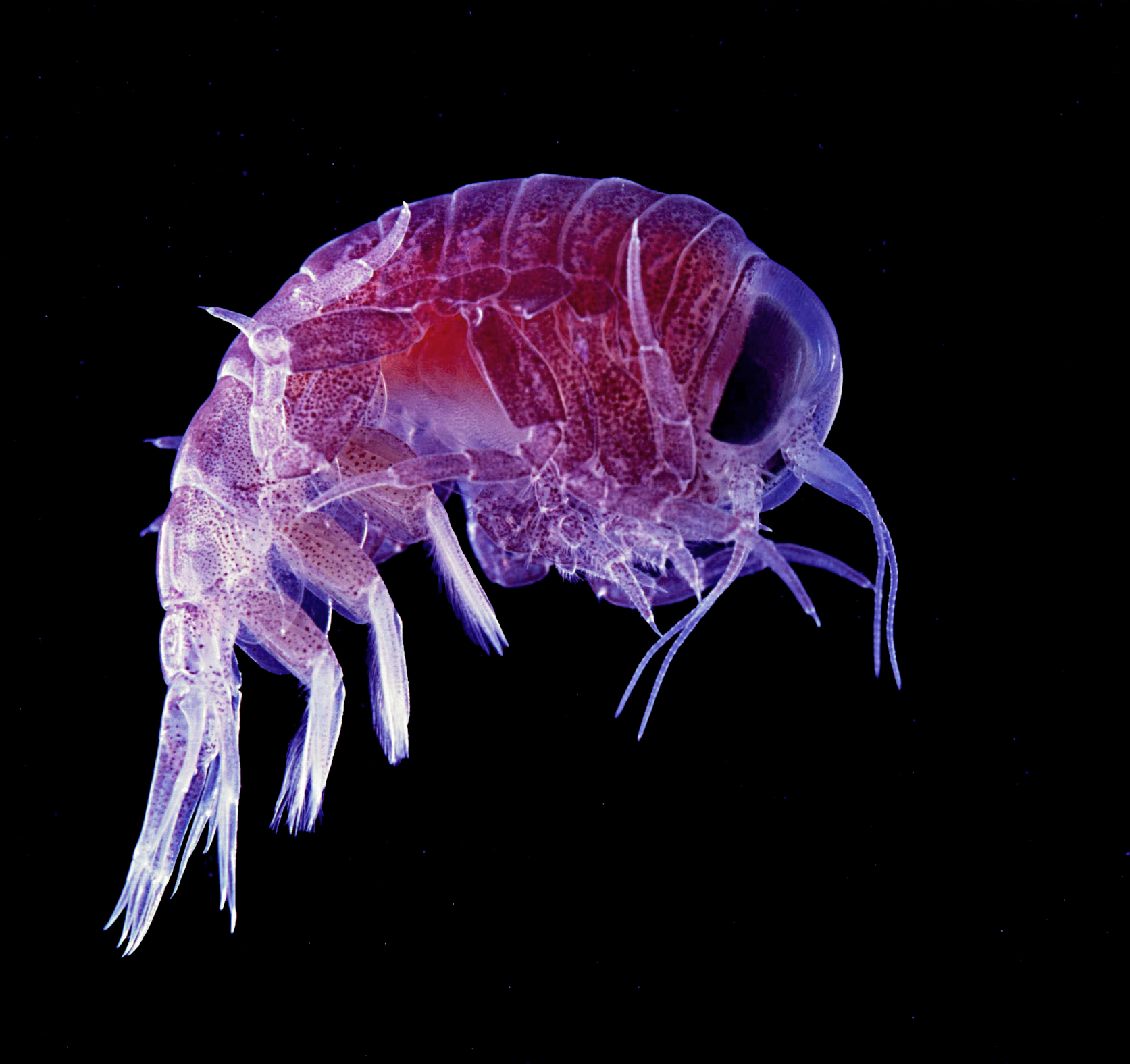
Hyperiidea

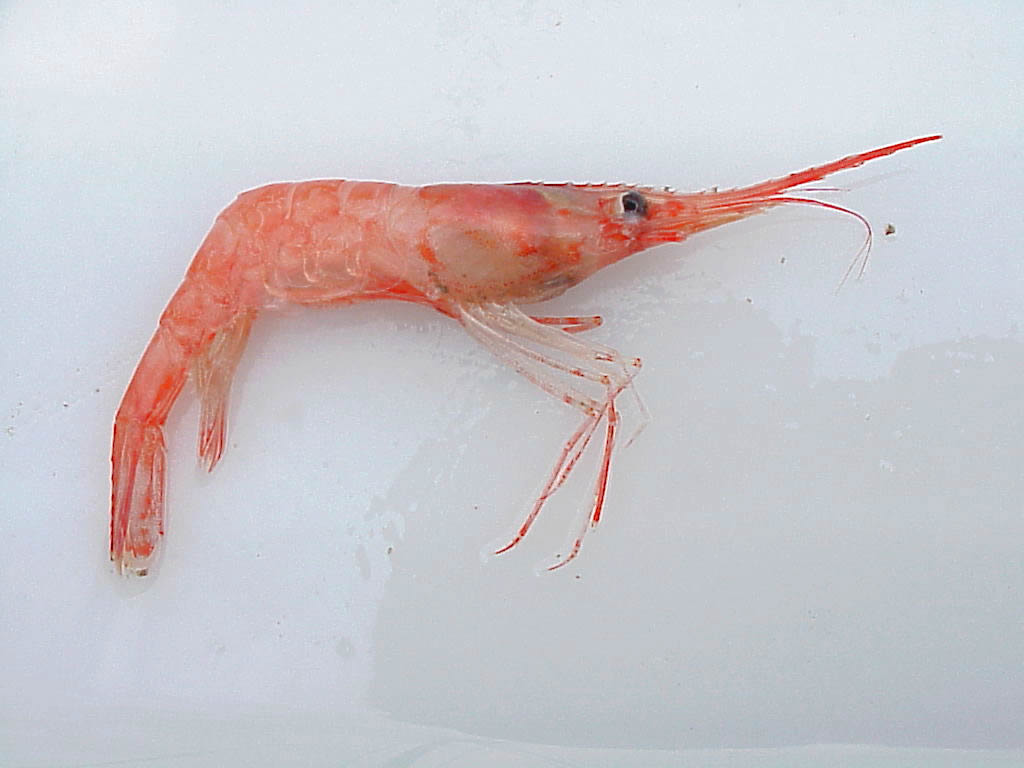
Shrimp Pandalus borealis

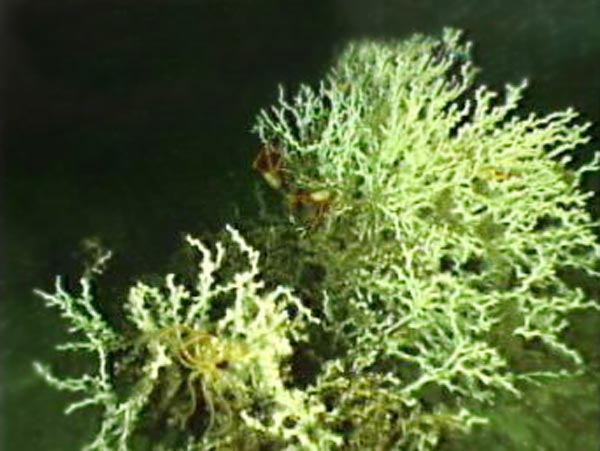
Lophelia pertusa

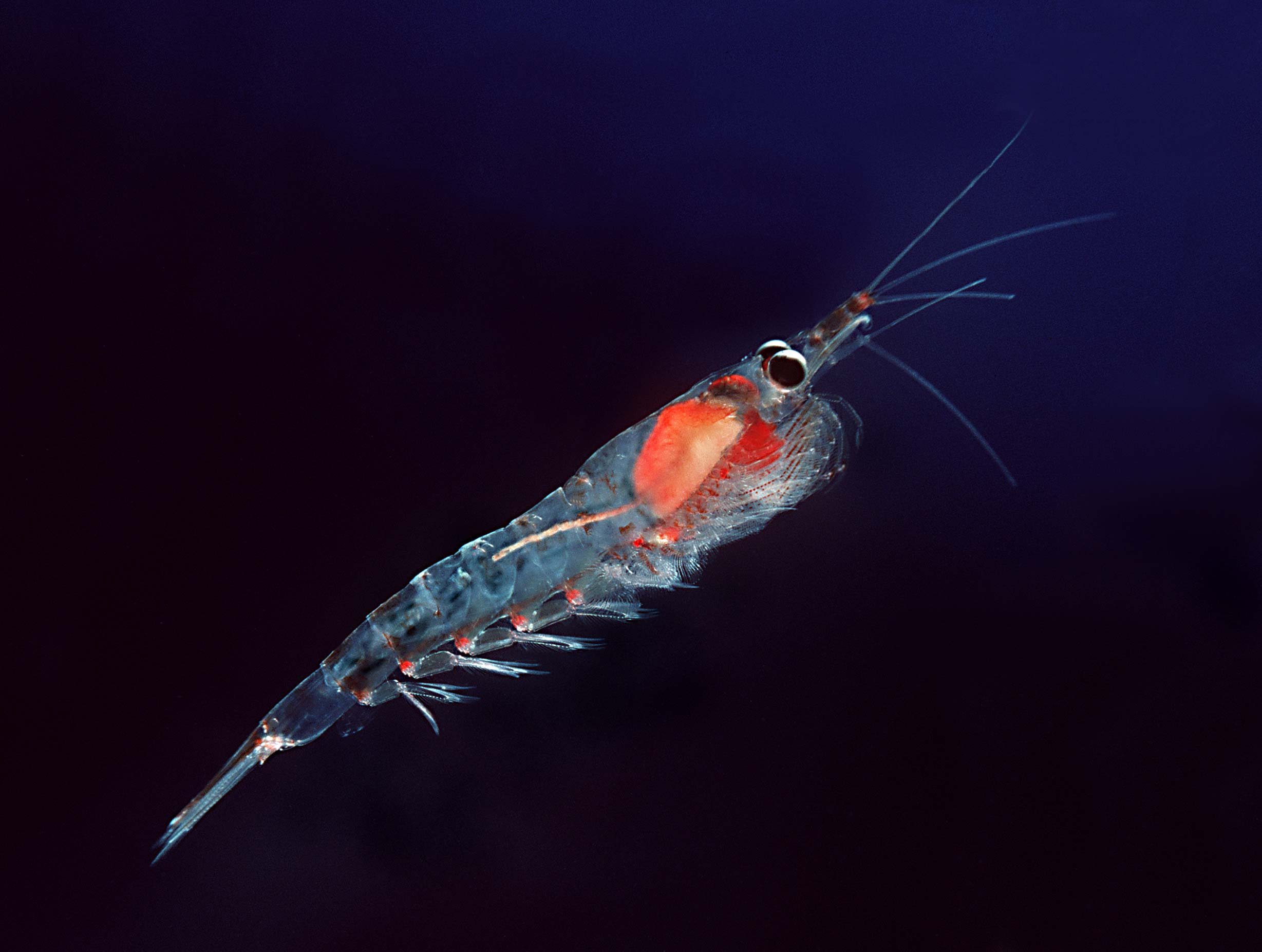
Meganyctiphanes norvegica

Zooplankton is mostly represented by the copepods Calanus finmarchicus and Calanus hyperboreus, where the former occurs about four times more often than the latter and is mostly found in the Atlantic streams, whereas C. hyperboreus dominates the Arctic waters; they are the main diet of most marine predators. The most important krill species are Meganyctiphanes norvegica, Thyssanoessa inermis, and Thyssanoessa longicaudata. In contrast to the Greenland Sea, there is a significant presence of calcareous plankton (Coccolithophore and Globigerinida) in the Norwegian Sea. Plankton production strongly fluctuates between years. For example, C. finmarchicus yield was 28 g/m^{2} (dry weight) in 1995 and only 8 g/m^{2} in 1997; this correspondingly affected the population of all its predators.

Shrimp of the species Pandalus borealis play an important role in the diet of fish, particularly cod and blue whiting, and mostly occur at depths between 200 and 300 metres (656 and 984 feet). A special feature of the Norwegian Sea is extensive coral reefs of Lophelia pertusa, which provide shelter to various fish species. Although these corals are widespread in many peripheral areas of the North Atlantic, they never reach such amounts and concentrations as at the Norwegian continental slopes. However, they are at risk due to increasing trawling, which mechanically destroys the coral reefs.

=== Fish ===
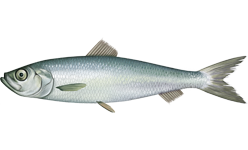
Atlantic herring

The Norwegian coastal waters are the most important spawning ground of the herring populations of the North Atlantic, and the hatching occurs in March. The eggs float to the surface and are washed off the coast by the northward current. Whereas a small herring population remains in the fjords and along the northern Norwegian coast, the majority spends the summer in the Barents Sea, where it feeds on the rich plankton. Upon reaching puberty, herring returns to the Norwegian Sea. The herring stock varies greatly between years. It increased in the 1920s owing to the milder climate and then collapsed in the following decades until 1970; the decrease was, however, at least partly caused by overfishing. The biomass of young hatched herring declined from 11,000,000 tonnes (11,000,000 long tons; 12,000,000 short tons) in 1956 to almost zero in 1970; that affected the ecosystem not only of the Norwegian Sea but also of the Barents Sea.

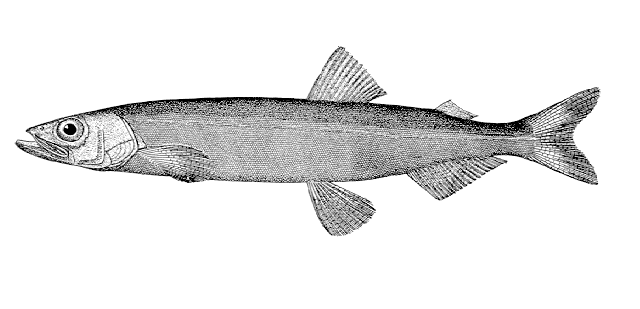
Capelin is a common fish of the Atlantic-arctic transitional waters

Enforcement of environmental and fishing regulations has resulted in partial recovery of the herring populations since 1987. This recovery was accompanied by a decline of capelin and cod stocks. While the capelin benefited from the reduced fishing, the temperature rise in the 1980s and competition for food with the herring resulted in a near disappearance of young capelin from the Norwegian Sea. Meanwhile, the elderly capelin population was quickly fished out. This also reduced the population of cod – a major predator of capelin – as the herring was still too small in numbers to replace the capelin in the cod's diet.

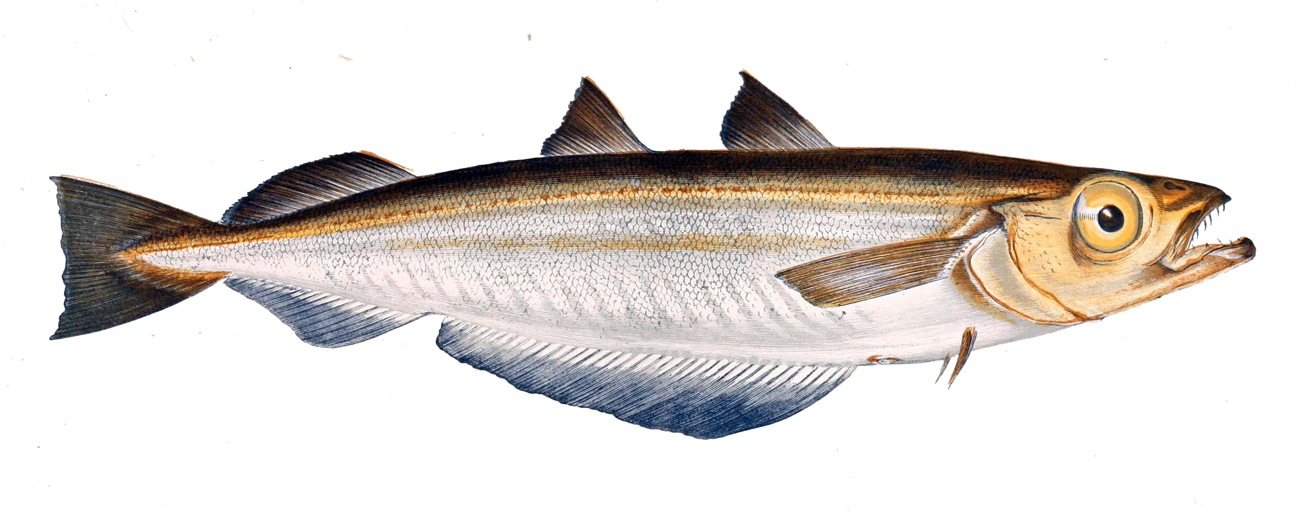
Blue whiting

Blue whiting (Micromesistius poutassou) has benefited from the decline of the herring and capelin stocks as it assumed the role of major predator of plankton. The blue whiting spawns near the British Isles. The sea currents carry their eggs to the Norwegian Sea, and the adults also swim there to benefit from the food supply. The young spend the summer and the winter until February in Norwegian coastal waters and then return to the warmer waters west of Scotland. The Norwegian Arctic cod mostly occurs in the Barents Sea and at the Svalbard Archipelago. In the rest of the Norwegian Sea, it is found only during the reproduction season, at the Lofoten Islands, whereas Pollachius virens and haddock spawn in the coastal waters. Mackerel is an important commercial fish. The coral reefs are populated by different species of the genus Sebastes.

=== Mammals and birds ===
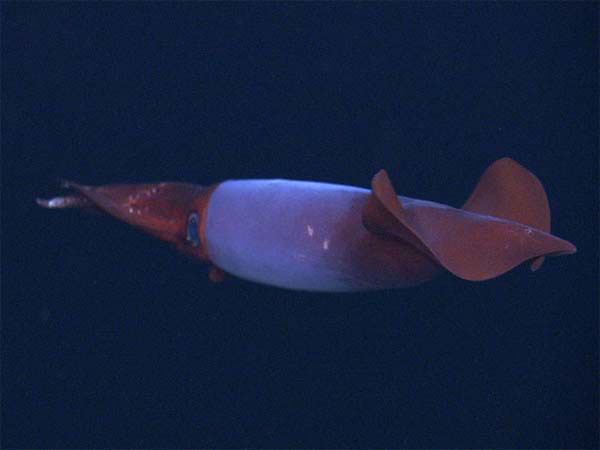
Armhook squid Gonatus fabricii

Significant numbers of minke, humpback, sei, and orca whales are present in the Norwegian Sea, and white-beaked dolphins occur in the coastal waters. Orcas and some other whales visit the sea in the summer months for feeding; their population is closely related to the herring stocks, and they follow the herring schools within the sea. With a total population of about 110,000, minke whales are by far the most common whales in the sea. They are hunted by Norway and Iceland, with a quota of about 1,000 per year in Norway. In contrast to the past, nowadays primarily their meat is consumed, rather than fat and oil.

The bowhead whale used to be a major plankton predator, but it almost disappeared from the Norwegian Sea after intense whaling in the 19th century, and was temporarily extinct in the entire North Atlantic. Similarly, the blue whale used to form large groups between Jan Mayen and Spitsbergen, but is hardly present nowadays. Observations of northern bottlenose whales in the Norwegian Sea are rare. Other large animals of the sea are hooded and harp seals and squid.

Important waterfowl species of the Norwegian Sea are puffin, kittiwake and guillemot. Puffins and guillemots also suffered from the collapse of the herring population, especially the puffins on the Lofoten Islands. The latter hardly had an alternative to herring and their population was approximately halved between 1969 and 1987.

== Human activities ==
Norway, Iceland, and Denmark/Faroe Islands share the territorial waters of the Norwegian Sea, with the largest part belonging to the first. Norway has claimed twelve-mile limit as territorial waters since 2004 and an exclusive economic zone of 200 nautical miles (230 mi; 370 km) since 1976. Consequently, due to the Norwegian islands of Svalbard and Jan Mayen, the southeast, northeast and northwest edge of the sea fall within Norway. The southwest border is shared between Iceland and Denmark/Faroe Islands.

According to the Føroyingasøga, Norse settlers arrived on the islands around the 8th century. King Harald Fairhair is credited with being the driving force to colonize these islands as well as others in the Norwegian sea.

The largest damage to the Norwegian Sea was caused by extensive fishing, whaling, and pollution. Other contamination is mostly by oil and toxic substances, but also from the great number of ships sunk during the two world wars. The environmental protection of the Norwegian Sea is mainly regulated by the OSPAR Convention.

=== Fishing and whaling ===
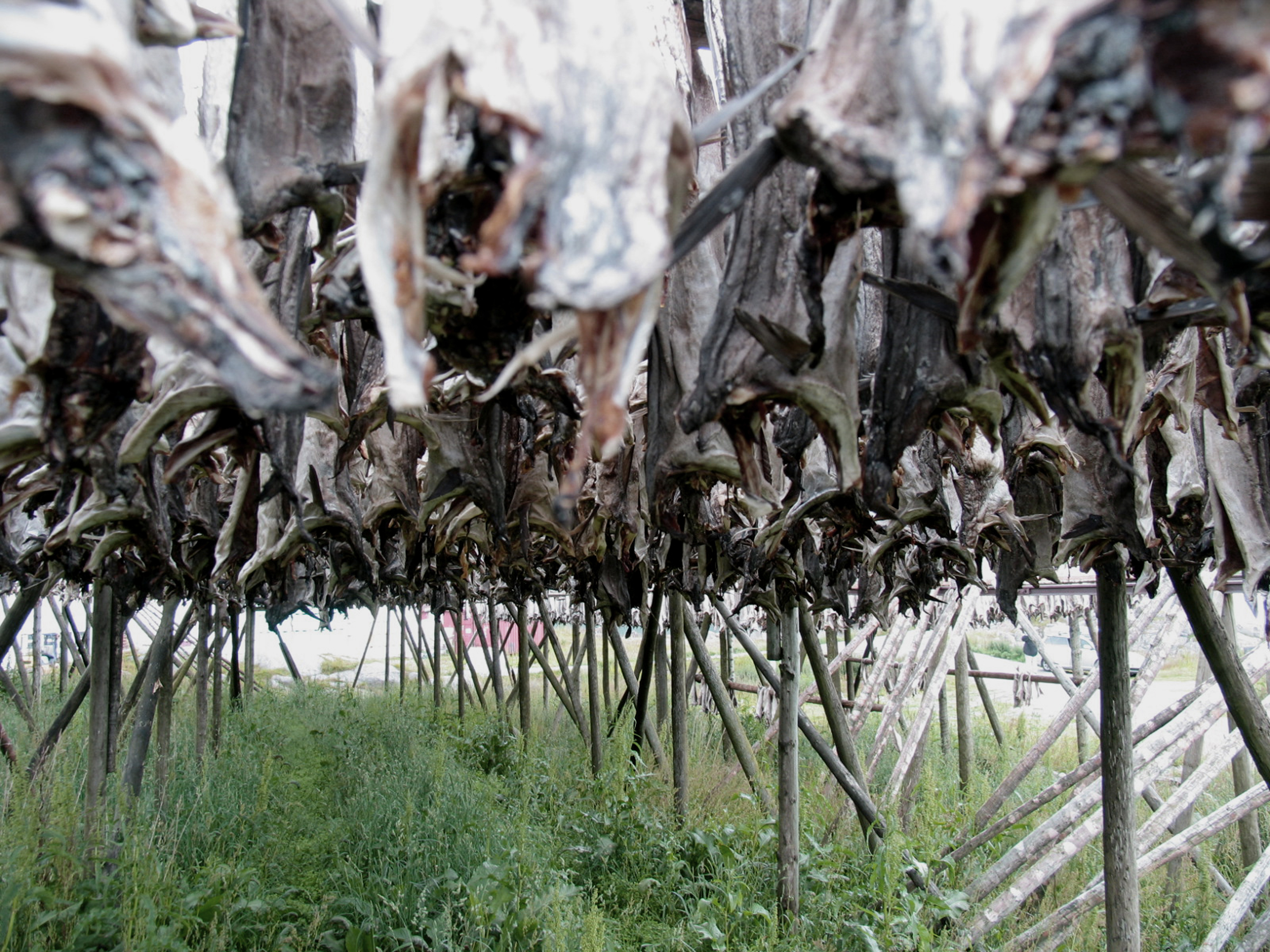
Traditional cod stand

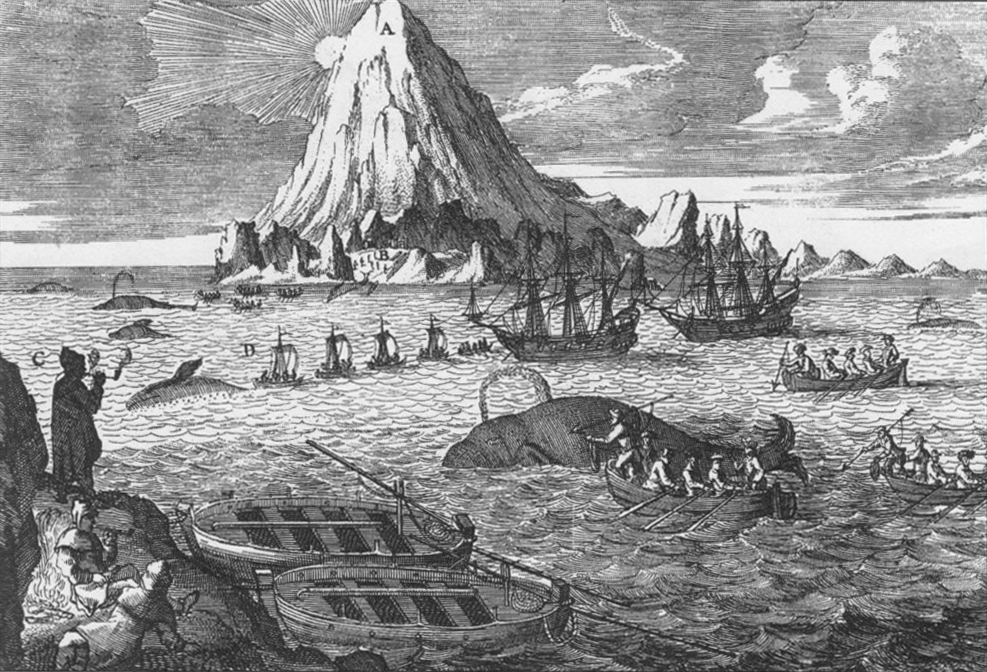
Arctic whaling (18th century). The ships are Dutch and the animals are bowhead whales. The Beerenberg volcano on Jan Mayen island can be seen in the background.

Fishing has been practised near the Lofoten archipelago for hundreds of years. The coastal waters of the remote Lofoten islands are one of the richest fishing areas in Europe, as most of the Atlantic cod swims to the coastal waters of Lofoten in the winter to spawn. So in the 19th century, dried cod was one of Norway's main exports and by far the most important industry in northern Norway. Strong sea currents, maelstroms, and especially frequent storms made fishing a dangerous occupation: several hundred men died on the "Fatal Monday" in March 1821, 300 of them from a single parish, and about a hundred boats with their crews were lost within a short time in April 1875.

Over the last century, the Norwegian Sea has been suffering from overfishing. In 2018, 41% of stocks were excessively harvested. Two out of sixteen of the Total Allowed Catches (TACs) agreed upon by the European Union (EU) and Norway follow scientific advice. Nine of those TACs are at least 25% above scientific advice. While the other five are set above scientific evidence when excluding landing obligation. Under the Common Fisheries Policy (CFP), the EU committed to phase out overfishing by 2015, 2020 at the absolute latest. As of 2019, the EU was reported to not be on path to achieving that goal.

Whaling was also important for the Norwegian Sea. In the early 1600s, the Englishman Stephen Bennet started hunting walrus at Bear Island. In May 1607 the Muscovy Company, while looking for the Northwest Passage and exploring the sea, discovered the large populations of walrus and whales in the Norwegian Sea and started hunting them in 1610 near Spitsbergen. Later in the 17th century, Dutch ships started hunting bowhead whales near Jan Mayen; the bowhead population between Svalbard and Jan Mayen was then about 25,000 individuals. Britons and Dutch were then joined by Germans, Danes, and Norwegians. Between 1615 and 1820, the waters between Jan Mayen, Svalbard, Bear Island, and Greenland, between the Norwegian, Greenland, and Barents Seas, were the most productive whaling area in the world. However, extensive hunting had wiped out the whales in that region by the early 20th century.

=== Sea monsters and maelstroms ===
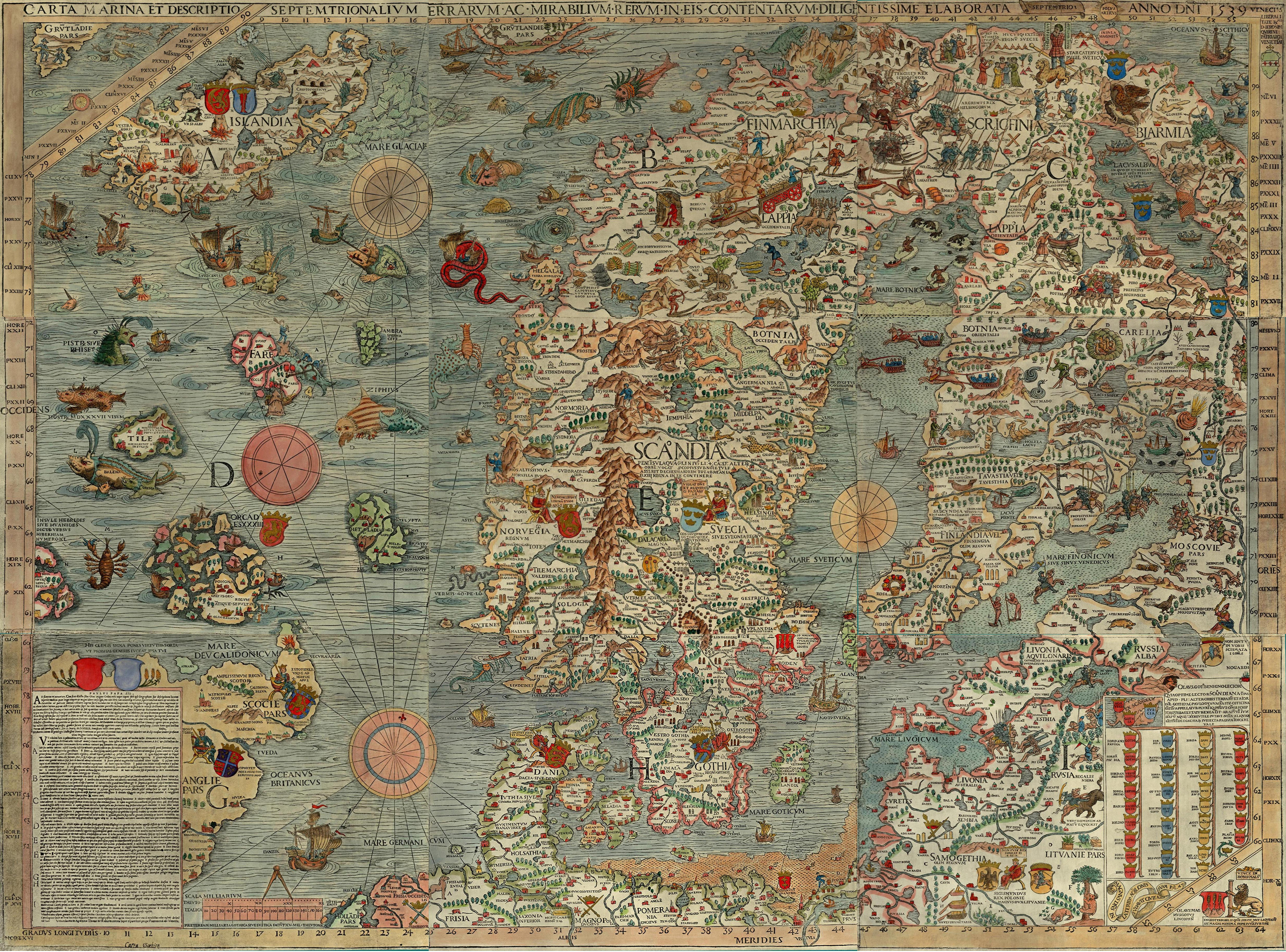
The Carta Marina (1539) by Olaus Magnus is the earliest detailed map of the Nordic countries. Note various sea monsters on the map.

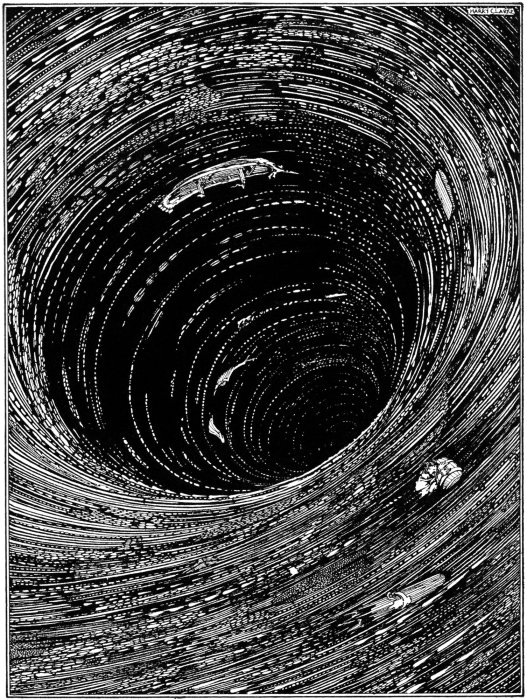
Illustration by Harry Clarke (1889–1931) for Edgar Allan Poe's story "Descent into the Maelstrom," published in 1919.

For many centuries, the Norwegian Sea was regarded as the edge of the known world. The disappearance of ships there, due to the natural disasters, induced legends of monsters that stopped and sank ships (kraken). As late as in 1845, the Encyclopædia metropolitana contained a multi-page review by Erik Pontoppidan (1698–1764) on ship-sinking sea monsters half a mile (0.8 km) in size. Many legends might be based on the work Historia de gentibus septentrionalibus of 1539 by Olaus Magnus, which described the kraken and maelstroms of the Norwegian Sea. The kraken also appears in Alfred Tennyson's poem of the same name, in Herman Melville's Moby Dick, and in Twenty Thousand Leagues Under the Seas by Jules Verne.

Between the Lofoten islands of Moskenesøya and Værøya, at the tiny Mosken island, lies the Moskenstraumen – a system of tidal eddies and a whirlpool called a maelstrom. With a speed on the order of 15 km/h (9 mph; 8 kn) (the value strongly varies between sources), it is one of the strongest maelstroms in the world. It was described in the 13th century in the Old Norse Poetic Edda and remained an attractive subject for painters and writers, including Edgar Allan Poe, Walter Moers, and Jules Verne. The word was introduced into the English language by Poe in his story "A Descent into the Maelström" (1841) describing the Moskenstraumen. The Moskenstraumen is created as a result of a combination of several factors, including the tides, the position of the Lofoten, and the underwater topography; unlike most other whirlpools, it is located in the open sea rather than in a channel or bay. With a diameter of 40 to 50 metres (131 to 164 feet), it can be dangerous even in modern times to small fishing vessels that might be attracted by the abundant cod feeding on the microorganisms sucked in by the whirlpool.

=== Exploration ===
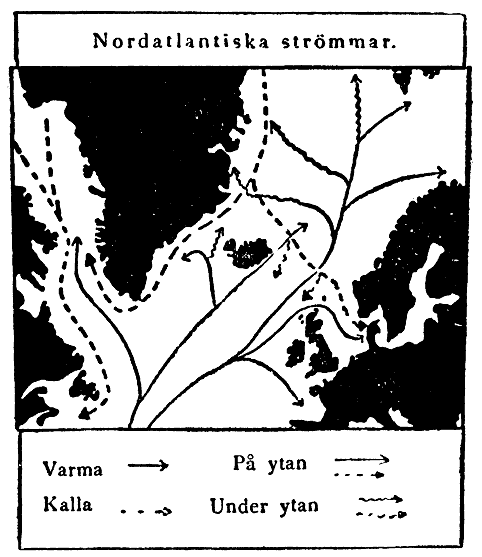
In the late 19th century, Henrik Mohn developed the first dynamic flow model of the North Atlantic. This map of 1904 shows surface and underwater currents.

The fish-rich coastal waters of northern Norway have long been known and attracted skilled sailors from Iceland and Greenland. Thus most settlements in Iceland and Greenland were on the west coasts of the islands, which were also warmer due to the Atlantic currents. The first reasonably reliable map of northern Europe, the Carta marina of 1539, represents the Norwegian Sea as coastal waters and shows nothing north of the North Cape. The Norwegian Sea off the coast regions appeared on the maps in the 17th century as an important part of the then sought Northern Sea Route and a rich whaling ground.

Jan Mayen island was discovered in 1607 and become an important base of Dutch whalers. The Dutchman Willem Barents discovered Bear Island and Svalbard, which was then used by Russian whalers called pomors. The islands on the edge of the Norwegian Sea have been rapidly divided between nations. During the peaks of whaling, some 300 ships with 12,000 crew members were yearly visiting Svalbard.

The first depth measurements of the Norwegian Sea were performed in 1773 by Constantine Phipps aboard HMS Racehorse, as a part of his North Pole expedition. Systematic oceanographic research in the Norwegian Sea started in the late 19th century, when declines in the yields of cod and herring off the Lofoten prompted the Norwegian government to investigate the matter. The zoologist Georg Ossian Sars and meteorologist Henrik Mohn persuaded the government in 1874 to send out a scientific expedition, and between 1876 and 1878 they explored much of the sea aboard Vøringen. The data obtained allowed Mohn to establish the first dynamic model of ocean currents, which incorporated winds, pressure differences, sea water temperature, and salinity and agreed well with later measurements. In 2019, deposits of iron, copper, zinc and cobalt were found on the Mohn Ridge, likely from hydrothermal vents.

=== Navigation ===
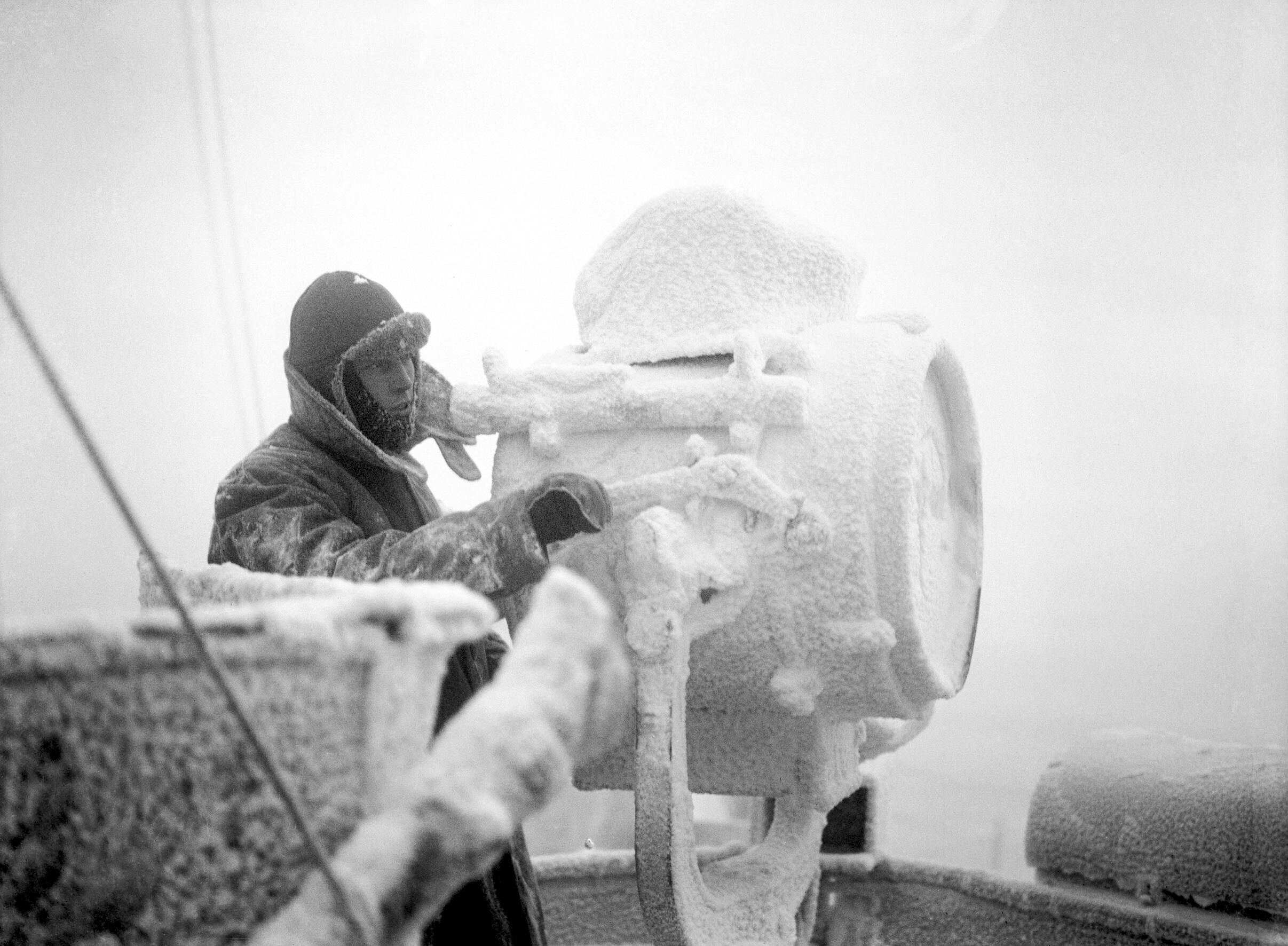
HMS Sheffield during the winter convoy through the Norwegian Sea to Russia in 1941

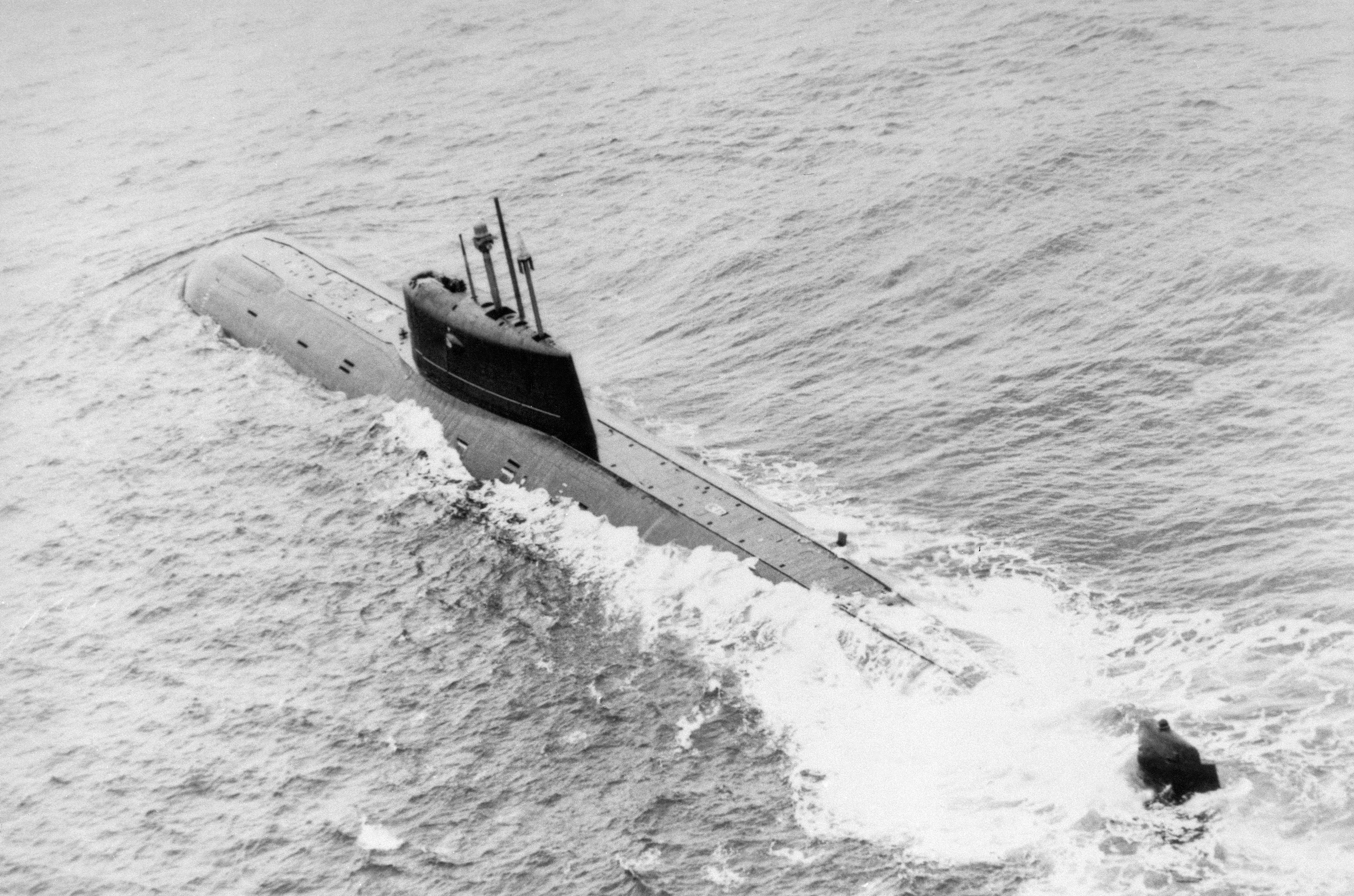
The Soviet nuclear submarine K-278 Komsomolets in 1986.

Until the 20th century, the coasts of the Norwegian Sea were sparsely populated and therefore shipping in the sea was mostly focused on fishing, whaling, and occasional coastal transportation. Since the late 19th century, the Norwegian Coastal Express sea line has been established, connecting the more densely populated south with the north of Norway by at least one trip a day. The importance of shipping in the Norwegian Sea also increased with the expansion of the Russian and Soviet navies in the Barents Sea and development of international routes to the Atlantic through the Baltic Sea, Kattegat, Skagerrak, and North Sea.

The Norwegian Sea is ice-free and provides a direct route from the Atlantic to the Russian ports in the Arctic (Murmansk, Arkhangelsk, and Kandalaksha), which are directly linked to central Russia. This route was extensively used for supplies during World War II – of 811 U.S. ships, 720 reached Russian ports, bringing some 4,000,000 tonnes (3,900,000 long tons; 4,400,000 short tons) of cargo that included about 5,000 tanks and 7,000 aircraft. The Allies lost 18 convoys and 89 merchant ships on this route. The major operations of the Kriegsmarine (German Navy) against the convoys included PQ 17 in July 1942, the Battle of the Barents Sea in December 1942, and the Battle of the North Cape in December 1943 and were carried out around the border between the Norwegian Sea and Barents Sea, near the North Cape.

Navigation across the Norwegian Sea declined after World War II and intensified only in the 1960s and 1970s with the expansion of the Soviet Northern Fleet, which was reflected in major joint naval exercises of the Soviet Northern and Baltic fleets in the Norwegian Sea. The sea was the gateway for the Soviet Navy to the Atlantic Ocean and thus to the United States, and the major Soviet port of Murmansk was just behind the border of the Norwegian and Barents Sea. The countermeasures by the North Atlantic Treaty Organization (NATO) countries resulted in a significant naval presence in the Norwegian Sea and intense cat-and-mouse games between Soviet and NATO aircraft, ships, and especially submarines. A relic of the Cold War in the Norwegian Sea, the Soviet nuclear submarine K-278 Komsomolets, sank in 1989 southwest of Bear Island, at the border of the Norwegian and Barents seas, with radioactive material on board that poses potential danger to flora and fauna.

The Norwegian Sea is part of the Northern Sea Route for ships making voyages between European ports and Asia. The travel distance from Rotterdam to Tokyo is 21,100 km (13,111 mi; 11,393 nmi) via the Suez Canal but only 14,100 km (8,761 mi; 7,613 nmi) through the Norwegian Sea. Sea ice is a common problem in the Arctic seas, but ice-free conditions along the entire northern route were observed at the end of August 2008. Russia is planning to expand its offshore oil production in the Arctic, which should increase the traffic of tankers through the Norwegian Sea to markets in Europe and North America; it is expected that the number of oil shipments through the northern Norwegian Sea will increase from 166 in 2002 to 615 in 2015.

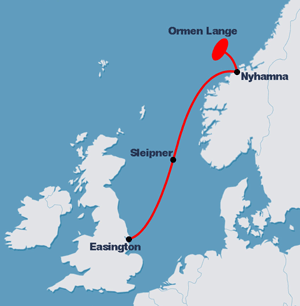
Map of the Langeled pipeline

=== Oil and gas ===
The most important products of the Norwegian Sea are no longer fish, but oil and especially gas found under the ocean floor. Norway started undersea oil production in 1993, followed by development of the Huldra gas field in 2001. The large depth and harsh waters of the Norwegian Sea pose significant technical challenges for offshore drilling. Whereas drilling at depths exceeding 500 metres (1,640 feet) has been conducted since 1995, only a few deep gas fields have been explored commercially. The most important current project is Ormen Lange (depth 800 to 1,100 metres (2,625 to 3,609 feet)), where gas production started in 2007. With reserves of 4.0×10^{11} m^{3} (1.4×10^{13} cu ft), it is the major Norwegian gas field. It is connected to the Langeled pipeline, currently the world's longest underwater pipeline, and thus to a major European gas pipeline network. Several other gas fields are being developed. As of 2019, there was an estimated 6.5 cubic hectometres (230,000,000 cu ft) of crude oil in the Norwegian Sea, with an expectation to increase oil production in the region up until 2025. A particular challenge is the Kristin field, where the temperature is as high as 170 °C (338 °F) and the gas pressure exceeds 900 bar (900 times the normal pressure). Further north are Norne and Snøhvit.

== In popular culture ==
In the fishing simulation game Russian Fishing 4, the Norwegian Sea is a popular map, especially for recreational boat fishing.

== See also ==
- List of seas

== Bibliography ==
- van Aken, Hendrik Mattheus (2007). The Oceanic Thermohaline Circulation: An Introduction. Springer. ISBN 978-0-387-36637-1.
- Blindheim, Johan (1989). "Ecological Features of the Norwegian Sea". In Louis René Rey; et al. (eds.). Proceedings of the Sixth Conference of the Comité arctique international, 13–15 May 1985. Brill Publishers. pp. 366–401. ISBN 90-04-08281-6.
- International Council for the Exploration of the Sea (2007). The Barents Sea and the Norwegian Sea (PDF). ICES Advice 2007. Vol. 3. Archived from the original on 2011-09-27.
- Johnson, Arne Odd (1982). The History of Modern Whaling. C. Hurst & Co. Publishers. ISBN 0-905838-23-8.
- Klinowska, Margaret, ed. (1991). Dolphins, Porpoises and Whales of the World: The IUCN Red Data Book. ISBN 2-88032-936-1.
- Mills, Eric L. (2001). "Mathematics in Neptune's Garden". In Helen M. Rozwadowski & David K. van Keuren (ed.). The Machine in Neptune's Garden: Historical Perspectives on Technology and the Marine Environment. Science History Publications/USA. ISBN 0-88135-372-8.
- Richards, John F. (2006). The Unending Frontier: An Environmental History of the Early Modern World. University of California Press. ISBN 0-520-24678-0.
- Sætre, Roald, ed. (2007). The Norwegian Coastal Current – Oceanography and Climate. Trondheim: Tapir Academic Press. ISBN 978-82-519-2184-8.
- Schaefer, Priska (2001). The Northern North Atlantic: A Changing Environment. Springer. ISBN 3-540-67231-1.
- Skreslet, Stig; North Atlantic Treaty Organization (2005). Jan Mayen Iceland in Scientific Focus. Springer. ISBN 1-4020-2956-X.
- Tyler, Paul A. (2003). Ecosystems of the Deep Oceans: Ecosystems of the World. Elsevier. ISBN 0-444-82619-X.
