= Degg =

Degg is a surname. Notable people with the surname include:

- Jakki Degg (born 1978), British glamour model and actress
- Randy Degg (born 1984), American football player
- Roland Degg (1909–2001), British battalion commander during World War II

== See also ==
- Dagg
- Deng (disambiguation)
- Pegg
