= Encyclopædia Metropolitana =

Nineteenth century British encyclopædia

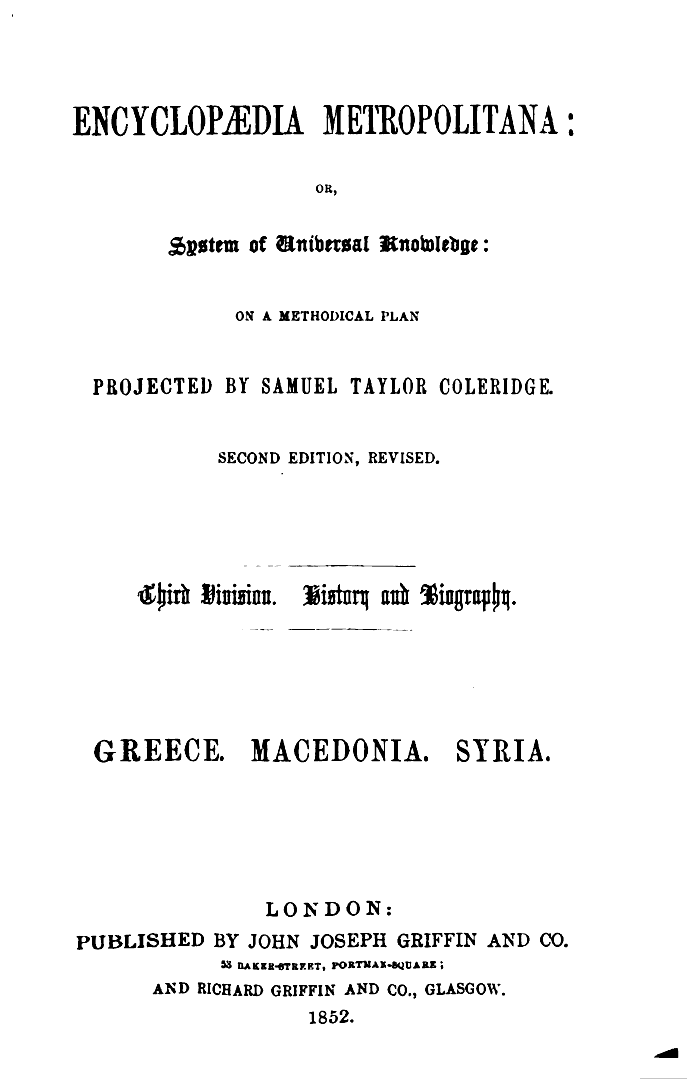
A title page from division three (history and biography) of the second edition

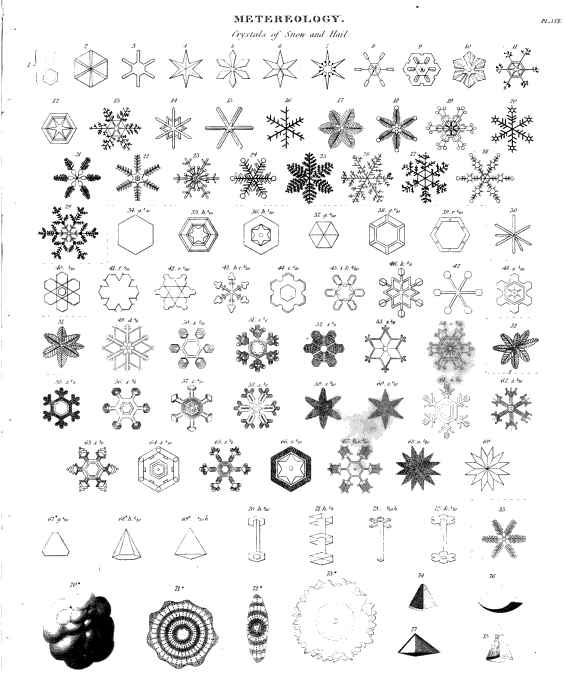
Snow flakes, engraving from George Harvey's 1834 article on meteorology

The Encyclopædia Metropolitana was an encyclopedic work published in London, from 1817 to 1845, by part publication. In all it came to quarto, 30 vols., having been issued in 59 parts (22,426 pages, 565 plates).

== Origins ==
Initially the project was part of transitional arrangements in 1817 under which Samuel Taylor Coleridge moved publisher, from John Mathew Gutch to Rest Fenner, working with the Rev. Thomas Curtis. Coleridge was offered the role of editor; he wrote the Introduction, which appeared in January 1818, brought out to compete with the fifth edition of the Encyclopædia Britannica which had appeared in 1817 in 20 volumes. Fenner, however, dropped the publication after five part-volumes.

The Encyclopædia Metropolitana was revived in 1820 by the intervention of Bishop William Howley, concerned also to compete with the Britannica, in this case to counter its secular tendency. Howley brought in William Rowe Lyall to take charge. Lyall in turn appointed Edward Smedley as editor. Smedley was succeeded in 1836 by Hugh James Rose.

A rival production was the London Encyclopædia (22 volumes beginning in 1825 and completed within a few years) of the publisher Thomas Tegg. Tegg used Thomas Curtis from the original Coleridge project as editor, and proclaimed the fact on the title page. As he explained in the 1829 preface to his work, Tegg had been obstructed by legal moves from the side of the Metropolitana, but went ahead anyway, pleading that compilations such as encyclopedias needed different rules of copyright.

== Plan of the work ==
It professed to give sciences and systematic arts entire and in their natural sequence. Coleridge's Introduction was a treatise on method, with fundamental approach to emphasize the relations of ideas:

Method, therefore, becomes natural to the mind which has been accustomed to contemplate not things only, or for their own sake alone, but likewise and chiefly the relations of things, either their relations to each other, or to the observer, or to the state and apprehension of the hearers. To enumerate and analyze these relations, with the conditions under which alone they are discoverable, is to teach the science of method.

Later critics said of the actual plan that, being the proposal of Coleridge, it had at least enough of a poetical character to be eminently impractical (Quarterly Review, cxiii, 379); but the treatises by Archbishop Richard Whately, Sir John Herschel, Professors Peter Barlow, George Peacock, Augustus De Morgan, and others, were considered excellent.

== Divisions ==
It is in four divisions, with only the last division being presented in an alphabetical structure:

- I. Pure Sciences, 2 vols., 1,813 pages, 16 plates, 28 treatises, includes grammar, law and theology;
- II. Mixed and Applied Sciences, 6 vols., 5,391 pages, 437 plates, 42 treatises, including fine arts, useful arts, natural history and its application, the medical sciences;
  - v.8 (i.e. Mixed Sciences v.6)
- III. History and biography, 5 vols., 4,458 pages, 7 maps, containing biography (135 essays) chronologically arranged (to Thomas Aquinas in vol. 3), and interspersed with (210) chapters on history (to 1815), as the most philosophical, interesting and natural form (but modern lives were so many that the plan broke down, and a division of biography, to be in 2 vols., was announced but not published);
  - v.11 (i.e. History and Biography v.3)
  - v.12 (i.e. History and Biography v.4)
- IV. Miscellaneous and lexicographical, 13 vols., 10,338 pages, 105 plates, including geography, a dictionary of English and descriptive natural history. An English lexicon, in parts, was supplied by Charles Richardson, from 1818.
  - v.16 (i.e. Miscellaneous v.3)
  - v.18 (i.e. Miscellaneous v.5)
  - v.23 (i.e. Miscellaneous v.10)

The plates were issued in three volumes. An index volume, 364 pages, contained about 9,000 articles.

A re-issue in 38 vols. quarto, was announced in 1849. Of a second edition 42 vols. 8vo, 14,744 pages, belonging to divisions i. to iii., were published in 1849–1858.
