= Daggs =

Daggs is a surname. Notable people with the surname include:

- Charles Daggs (1901–1976), American athlete
- Percy Daggs III (born 1982), American actor

== See also ==
- Dagg
