= London Encyclopaedia (1829) =

Encyclopedia of general knowledge, at London, 1829 and 1839

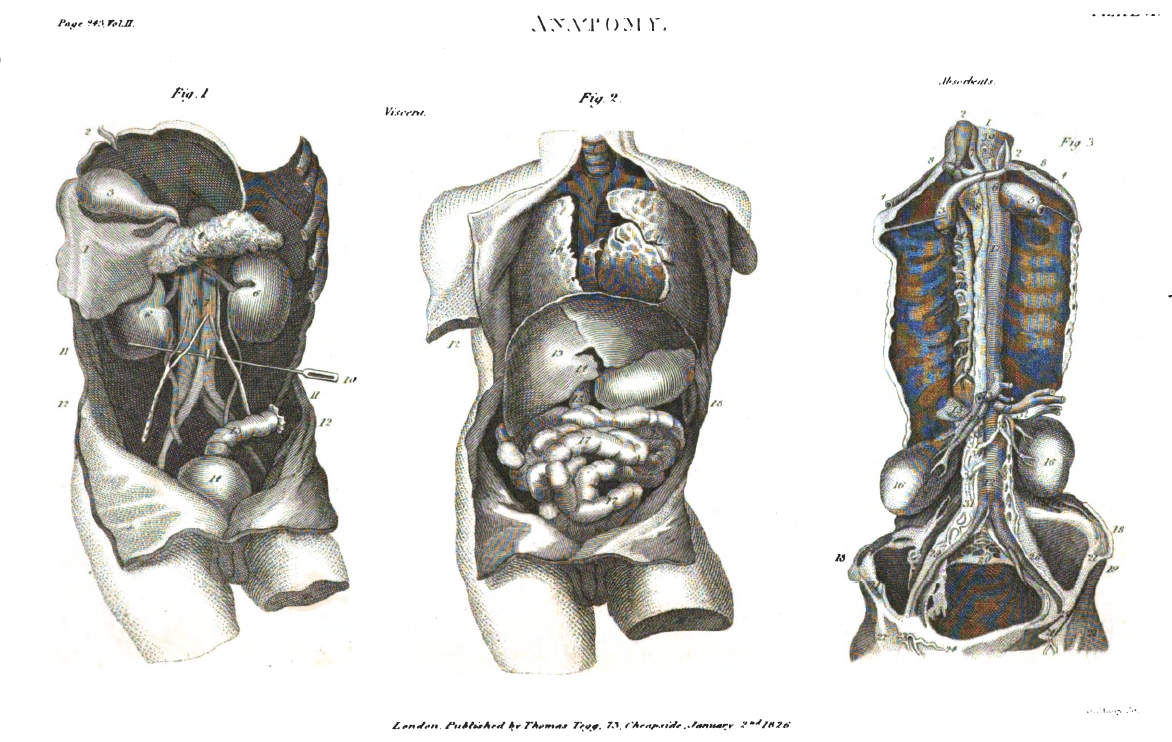
London Encyclopaedia (1829) Vol.2 "Anatomy" Plate VI

The publication of the London Encyclopaedia, or Universal Dictionary of Science, Art, Literature and Practical Mechanics: comprising a Popular View of the Present State of Knowledge was begun by London-based bookseller and publisher Thomas Tegg in 1825. It may be found in two original editions of 22 volumes, published 1829 and 1839, as well as more recent reprints.

The title page of Part 19 of the 1839 edition describes the work as follows: The London Encyclopædia, or, Universal Dictionary of Science, Art, Literature and Practical Mechanics, Including an English Lexicon, on the Basis of Dr. Johnson’s Larger Dictionary, But Re-modelled; the Definitions Being Simplified, and the Authorities Chronologically Arranged. Illustrated by 260 Engravings; a General Atlas of Forty Royal Quarto Maps, and Appropriate Diagrams. By the Original Editor of the Encyclopædia Metropolitana, Assisted by Eminent Professional and Other Gentlemen. The original editor of the Encyclopædia Metropolitana mentioned here was Thomas Curtis.

Thomas Tegg describes the project as follows in The Publisher's Address placed into another of his publications in 1828:

On the appearance of the Seventh Edition of Part the First of the LONDON ENCYCLOPÆDIA, the Proprietor feels it incumbent upon him to offer his grateful acknowledgments to the Public, for the unexampled success which his arduous undertaking has hitherto experienced... This most welcome and efficient testimony of public favour he chiefly attributes to the Plan of the Work;—its adaptation in form, in substance, and in price, to the largest portion of the reading community... Thus, instead of appropriating the present profits of the undertaking, he has invariably thrown them back upon the work itself; and he trusts, improvement in the variety, the originality, and the accuracy of the articles in each department is visible to every reader. The contributors possess the highest qualifications for the respective tasks assigned to them; their number has been augmented, and their remuneration increased. ...in all the essential requisites of science, literature, and good writing, the LONDON ENCYCLOPÆDIA is not inferior to any of its predecessors or contemporaries, while it combines in every branch all the improvements which are to be derived from its being the last in order of time.

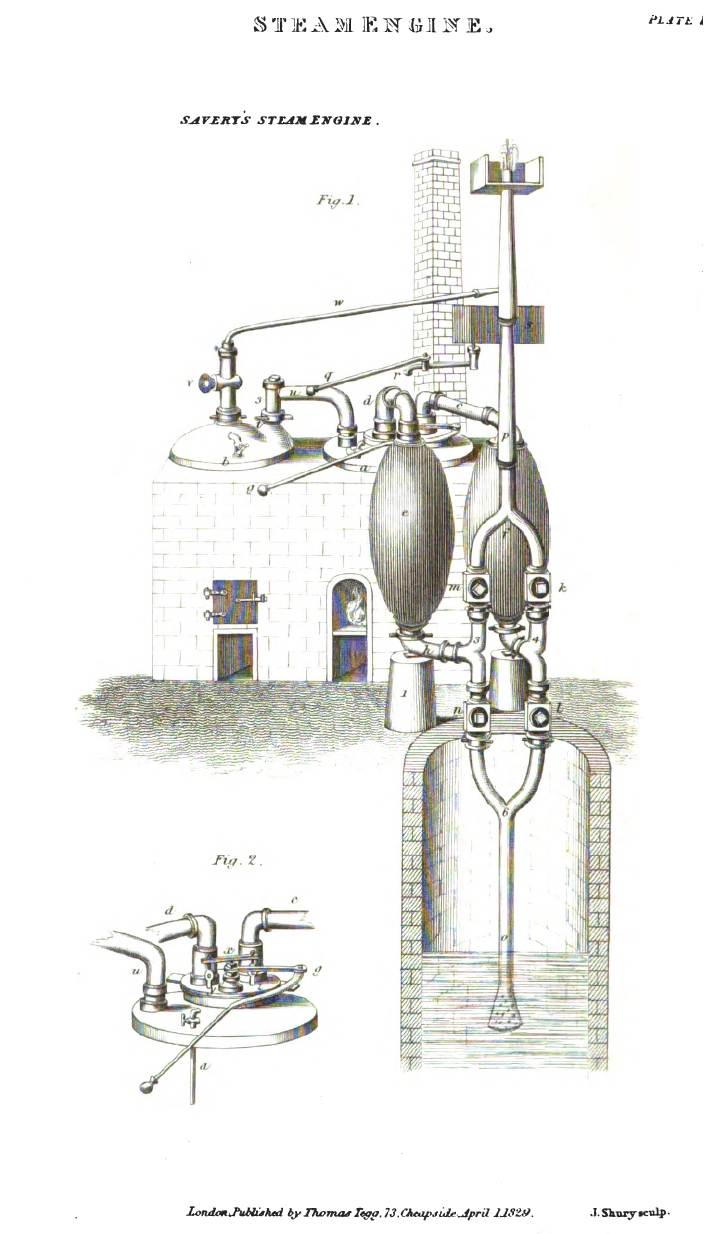
London Encyclopaedia (1829) Vol.21 "Steam Engine" (Savery's) Plate I

Now that the work is thus far advanced, and its publication has been punctual and regular, the Proprietor trusts that those who hesitated to become purchasers, lest the speculation should fail, will no longer apprehend a result, to avert which, were it necessary, he would readily sacrifice all the property he possesses in the world. He has embarked in the undertaking, and the arrangements for its completion are as perfect and as stable as any thing which man can devise or accomplish.

There are still very large classes of the community to whom the LONDON ENCYCLOPÆDIA is unknown; they are not aware probably of its nature and object—that with a cheapness, which, but for the extensiveness of its sale, would injure the Publisher, it combines all that is essential and really important in works of three times its magnitude and price; and that it may be universally acceptable,—in all the great debatable points, which belong not properly to knowledge, because the opinions of the wisest and the best of men are at variance upon them, the Editor has taken the utmost care to avoid exciting either political or religious animosities. The object of the work is to give information on all subjects, but not to play the advocate or special pleader with regard to any. Churchmen and Dissenters of all sects and classes may here learn what each other think; but they will not find the LONDON ENCYCLOPÆDIA an arsenal, furnishing them with weapons to carry on either an offensive or a defensive war.

...Society is now so far advanced, that the people must be supplied with mental resources: let them have science without scepticism, literature without irreligion, and intellectual enjoyment without the sacrifice of moral principle.
