= The Machine in Neptune's Garden =

2004 book edited by Helen M. Rozwadowski and David K. van Keuren

- Editors: Helen M. Rozwadowski and David K. van Keuren
- Language: English
- Subject: History of science and technology; ocean history; environmental history
- Published: 2004
- Publication place: USA
- Media type: Print
- Pages: 371 + xxviii
- ISBN: 0-88135-372-8

The Machine in Neptune's Garden: Historical Perspectives on Technology and the Marine Environment is a 2004 book edited by Helen M. Rozwadowski and David K. van Keuren. The book takes its name from Leo Marx's influential book The Machine in the Garden. It is a product of the Maury III conference on the history of oceanography held in Monterey, California in 2001. It argues the centrality of technology to the acquisition of knowledge of the oceans and contains ten thematically linked essays on the indispensable role of technology in the history of ocean science. It "demonstrate[s] that historians of science and technology should pay more attention to the history and historiography of oceanography." It is the most prominent work combining the history of technology, environmental history, and history of ocean sciences, and it is considered a foundational work in history of technology of the oceans and in the history of the marine environment.

== Contents ==
The book contains an introduction by Keith R. Benson and editors Helen M. Rozwadowski and David K. van Keuren, and ten chapters by historians of science and technology. The volume is dedicated to historian of science Philip F. Rehbock, who had died in 2002.

- 1. "Gauging Science and Technology in the Early Victorian Era" by Michael S. Reidy
- 2. "Mathematics in Neptune's Garden: Making the Physics of the Sea Quantitative, 1876-1900" by Eric L. Mills
- 3. "Fashioning Naval Oceanography: Columbus O'Donnell Iselin and American Preparation for War 1940-1941" by Gary E. Weir
- 4. "'A Wonderful Oceanographic Tool': The Atomic Bomb, Radioactivity and the Development of American Oceanography" by Ronald Rainger
- 5. "Choosing between Centers of Action: Instrument Buoys, El Niño, and Scientific Internationalism in the Pacific, 1957-1983" by Gregory T. Cushman
- 6. "Breaking New Ground: The Origins on Scientific Ocean Drilling" by David K. van Keuren
- 7. "An Eye into the Sea: The Early Development of Fisheries Acoustics in Norway, 1935-1960" by Vera Schwach
- 8. "From Civilian Plantonologist to Navy Oceanographer: Mary Sears in World War II" by Kathleen Broome Williams
- 9. "Modeling Neptune's Garden: The Chesapeake Bay Hydraulic Model, 1965-1984" by Christine Keiner
- 10. "Engineering, Imagination, and Industry: Scripps Island and Dreams for Ocean Science in the 1960s" by Helen M. Rozwadowski
