= Dagg =

Dagg is a surname. Notable people with the surname include:

- Anne Innis Dagg (1933–2024), Canadian zoologist, feminist and author
- Archie Dagg (1899–1990), English shepherd, fiddler, piper and composer
- Israel Dagg (born 1988), New Zealand rugby union player
- James Dagg, New Zealand sailor
- Jamie M. Dagg, Canadian film director and writer
- John L. Dagg (1794–1884), American Baptist minister and theologian
- Lyall Dagg (1929–1975), Canadian curler
- Thomas Dagg, Australian rugby league footballer

== Fictional character ==
- Fred Dagg

== See also ==
- Daggs
