= George Harvey (cricketer) =

Australian cricketer

Personal information
- Born: 7 May 1885; Mudgee, Australia
- Died: 8 September 1962 (aged 77); Sydney, Australia
- Source: ESPNcricinfo, 31 December 2016

George Harvey (7 May 1885 – 8 September 1962) was an Australian cricketer. He played seven first-class matches for New South Wales between 1909/10 and 1911/12.

== See also ==
- List of New South Wales representative cricketers
