= Pegg =

Pegg is a surname, and may refer to

- Dave Pegg, English folk rock musician
- David Pegg, English footballer
- David Pegg (physicist)
- Dominique Pegg, Canadian Olympic gymnast
- Ed Pegg, Jr., mathematician
- Kia Pegg, English actress and television presenter
- Len Pegg, Australian rugby league footballer
- Mark Pegg (actor), British actor and film producer
- Mark Gregory Pegg (born 1963), Australian professor of medieval history
- Simon Pegg, English actor, comedian and screenwriter
- Matthew Pegg, Fire Chief, Toronto Fire Services
- Antony Pegg, VP of Product Management at Fandom

== See also ==
- Pegge
- Peggs Green
