= George Harvey (FRS) =

English mathematician (died 1834)

George Harvey FRS FRSE FLS FGS FRAS (died 29 October 1834) was an English mathematician, known for his scientific and engineering writings, on meteorology, ship building, and colour blindness.

== Life ==
Harvey was based in Plymouth, where he trained as a physician before specialising in mathematics.

He tutored William Yolland in mathematics. Later he became a lecturer in mathematics at the Royal Military Academy, Woolwich. Around 1826, his name was mentioned in correspondence about a professorial post at the University of Virginia, between Francis Walker Gilmer and Peter Barlow. The chair went in the end to Charles Bonnycastle.

Harvey became a Fellow of the Royal Society of Edinburgh in 1824 his proposer being Thomas Frederick Colby. Next year he became Fellow of the Royal Society of London. He was also a Fellow of the Royal Astronomical Society, Geological Society and Linnaean Society.

During his last years, Harvey was Local Secretary at Plymouth for the Society for the Diffusion of Useful Knowledge. In 1834 The Literary Gazette reported his death at Plymouth, "where he fell by his own hand while under the influence of a melancholy deprivation of reason." The notice remarks that he was among the ablest mathematicians of our age and country, and of a noble disposition, intensely awake to the sufferings of his fellow human beings. The writer suspects this acute sensibility lay behind the overwrought condition which led to the tragedy. He was an intimate friend of the Devon poet Nicholas Toms Carrington and of the Cornish engineer and author Davies Gilbert.

== Works ==
Harvey was friends with Charles Babbage and interested in French mathematics. He translated from the French work on the method of least squares by Adrien-Marie Legendre, and on the calculus of variations by Charles Bossut.

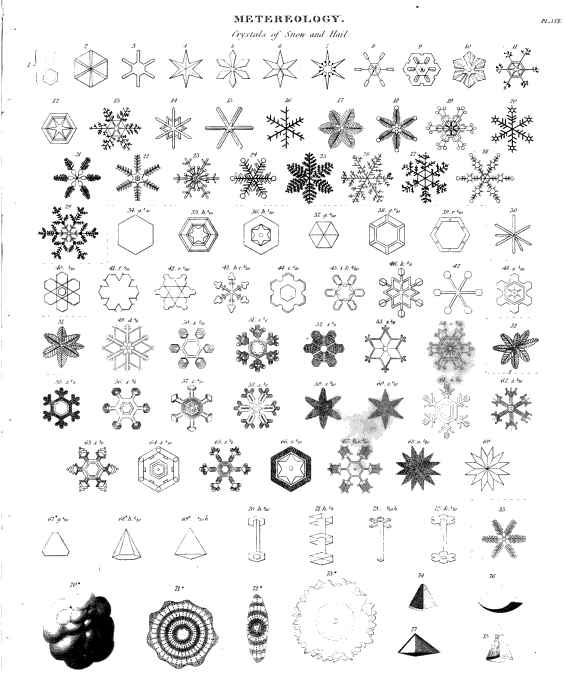
Snow flakes, engraving from Harvey's 1834 article on meteorology.

Harvey's article on meteorology for the Encyclopædia Metropolitana (Mixed Sciences vol. III) was printed separately (1834), and reissued in the 1848 Encyclopaedia of Experimental Philosophy, with works by Peter Barlow, Peter Mark Roget and Francis Lunn; his remark that folk wisdom came out ahead of science in the matter of weather forecasts was noted later.

Harvey also wrote on "Naval Architecture" for the Metropolitana. He wrote for the Edinburgh Encyclopædia on Plymouth and naval topics; the article "Ship-building" earned Harvey a diamond ring from the Tsar of Russia, presented by Prince Lieven. At the 1832 meeting of the British Association, Harvey stated that British naval design was falling behind in mathematical theory, whatever the advantages brought by Robert Seppings in internal design.

He published two papers in the Philosophical Transactions for 1824. They dealt with the accuracy of chronometers and the magnetic compass.

A paper by Harvey on colour blindness from 1824.On an Anomalous Case of Vision with regard to Colours, has been regarded as pioneering, for its use of a table of Patrick Syme. The table was from Syme's 1814 edition of the Nomenclature of Colours by Abraham Gottlob Werner; its use moved studies of the condition on from the case history to the standardised test.
