= Leo Marx =

American historian, literary critic and educator (1919–2022)

- Born: November 15, 1919; New York City, U.S.
- Died: March 8, 2022 (aged 102); Boston, Massachusetts, U.S.
- Education: Harvard University (AB, PhD)
- Occupation: Historian
- Spouse: Jane T. Pike (m. 1943; died 2006)
- Children: 3
- Scientific career
- Institutions: University of Minnesota; Amherst College; Massachusetts Institute of Technology

Leo Marx (November 15, 1919 – March 8, 2022) was an American historian, literary critic, and educator. He was Professor of the History and Philosophy of Science at the Massachusetts Institute of Technology. He is known for his works in the field of American studies. Marx studied the relationship between technology and culture in 19th and 20th century America.

== Early life and education ==
Leo Marx was born on November 15, 1919, in New York City, to Leo and Theresa (Rubinstein) Marx. His father worked in the estate sales business and his mother was a homemaker. He grew up in New York City and Paris; his father died when Leo was a child. He graduated from Harvard University with a BA in history and literature in 1941. (Note: Henry Nash Smith was Marx' faculty adviser at Harvard.) Military service in World War II followed, in the South Pacific. Marx returned to Harvard afterwards and got a PhD in 1950, one of the first to be granted in the History of American Civilization.

== Career ==
Marx taught at the University of Minnesota from 1949 to 1958 and then at Amherst College from 1958 to 1977 before joining the faculty of MIT in 1976. His intellectual work is associated with John William Ward.

From 1976 to 2015, Marx was the William R. Kenan Jr. Professor of American Cultural History at MIT. He changed his teaching style accordingly, since students at MIT were more interested in technology than in literature. Marx added environmental studies to his repertoire. After retirement in 1990, he continued on as a senior lecturer until 2015.

In 1964, Marx published The Machine in the Garden. The book explores 19th century American literature and its contrast of the pastoral ideal with the rapid changes caused by emerging technology. Marx called the style the "interrupted idyll". The book was based upon a thesis Marx began at Harvard and took 15 years to finish. It is seen as a major, foundational work in the field of American studies.

== Personal life ==
Marx married Jane T. Pike in 1943. Together they had two sons and a daughter. His wife died in 2006.

Marx died at his home in Boston on March 8, 2022, at the age of 102.

== Awards and honors ==
Marx was awarded Guggenheim Fellowships in 1961 and 1965.

- Fulbright Lecturer three times in Europe
- Leonardo da Vinci Medal 2002
- Rockefeller Fellowship
- American Academy of Arts and Sciences, member
- American Studies Association
- American Literature Section of the Modern Language Association

== Selected publications ==
- Marx, Leo (1964). The Machine in the Garden: Technology and the Pastoral Ideal in America. New York: Oxford University Press.
- Marx, Leo (1989). The Pilot and the Passenger: Essays on Literature, Technology, and Culture in the United States. New York: Oxford University Press. ISBN 9780195048766.
- Marx, Leo; Smith, Merritt R. (1994). Does Technology Drive History? The Dilemma of Technological Determinism. Cambridge, Massachusetts: MIT Press. ISBN 9780262691673.
- Marx, Leo; Mazlish, Bruce (1998). Progress: Fact or Illusion. Ann Arbor: University of Michigan Press. ISBN 9780472085095.
- Marx, Leo; Conway, Jill; Keniston, Kenneth (1999). Earth, Air, Fire, Water: Humanistic Studies of the Environment. Amherst: University of Massachusetts Press. ISBN 9781558492219.
- Marx, Leo (December 2003). "Believing in America; An intellectual project and a national ideal". Boston Review.
- Marx, Leo (June 24, 1999). "The Struggle Over Thoreau". The New York Review of Books. 46 (11).
- Buell, Lawrence; Marx, Leo (December 2, 1999). "An Exchange on Thoreau". The New York Review of Books. 46 (19).
- Marx, Leo (January 1987). "Does Improved Technology Mean Progress?" (PDF). Technology Review: 33–41. Archived from the original (PDF) on February 14, 2019.
- Marx, Leo (Autumn 1953). "Mr. Eliot, Mr. Trilling, and Huckleberry Finn". The American Scholar. 22 (4): 423–440.
- Marx, Leo (Spring 2008). "The Idea of Nature in America" (PDF). Daedalus. 137 (2): 8–21. doi:10.1162/daed.2008.137.2.8. S2CID 57564081.

== See also ==
- American studies
- Cultural studies
- Progress
- F. Scott Fitzgerald
