= Pegge =

Pegge is a surname, and may refer to:

- Catherine Pegge, mistress of King Charles II of England and mother of Charles FitzCharles, 1st Earl of Plymouth
- Edward Pegge, Wales international rugby union player
- Edward Pegge (High Sheriff) of Beauchief High Sheriff of Derbyshire 1664
- Maud Pegge, the British archaeologist Maud Cunnington
- Peter Pegge-Burnell of Beauchief High Sheriff of Derbyshire 1788
- Samuel Pegge, British antiquary
- Samuel Pegge (the younger), British antiquary
- Strelley Pegge of Beauchief High Sheriff of Derbyshire 1739
