= William Tegg =

English publisher

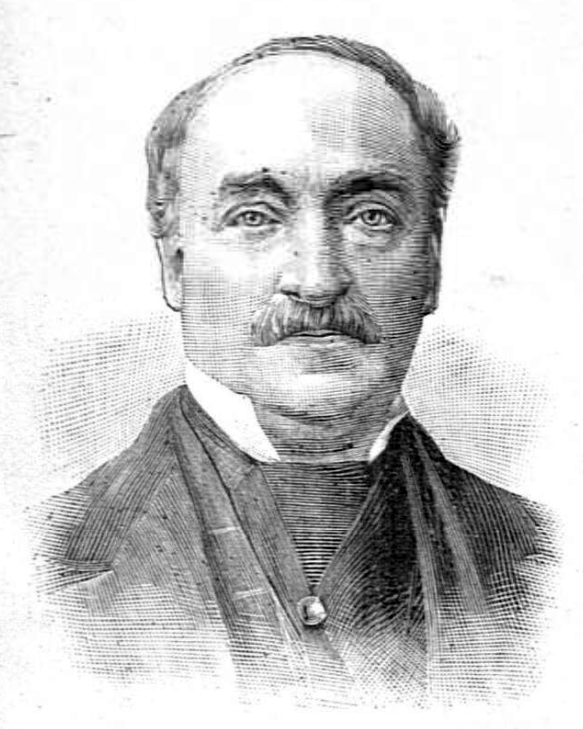
Portrait of William Tegg

William Tegg (1816–1895) was an English publisher in London.

== Life ==
The son of Thomas Tegg, he was born in Cheapside, London. After being articled to an engraver, he was taken into his father's prolific publishing and bookselling business, and took it over when his father died in 1845. He sold off stock, however, as required by Thomas Tegg's will, and carried on at a smaller scale.

Tegg was known as a publisher of school-books, and he was a successful exporter. In 1847 he moved within the City of London to 12 Pancras Lane, Cordwainer ward; he moved to 85 Queen Street, Cheapside three years later, and then back to Pancras Lane in 1860.

George Cruikshank and Charles Dickens in their early days were close friends of Tegg; Edmund Kean, Charles Kemble, and Dion Boucicault were friends in the long term. In local politics he was an active member of the common council of the City of London.

Tegg retired from business in 1890. He died at 13 Doughty Street, London, where he had lived from 1883, on 23 December 1895.

== Family ==
He was married to his wife Hannah née Veargitt in 1836

== Published works ==
Tegg published compilations, and part of his business was low-cost reprints of standard works. He brought out popular juvenile literature by "Peter Parley": it was reprinted or adapted from works by Samuel Griswold Goodrich. His publications included:

- The Cruet Stand: a Collection of Anecdotes, 1871.
- Epitaphs . . . and a Selection of Epigrams, 1875.
- Proverbs from Far and Near, Wise Sentences . . ., 1875.
- Laconics, or good Words of the Best Authors, 1875.
- The Mixture for Low Spirits, being a Compound of Witty Sayings, 4th ed. 1876.
- Trials of W. Hone for publishing Three Parodies, 1876.
- Wills of their own, Curious, Eccentric, and Benevolent, 1876, 4th ed. 1879.
- The Last Act, being the Funeral Rites of Nations and Individuals, 1876.
- Meetings and Greetings: Salutations of Nations, 1877.
- The Knot tied, Marriage Ceremonies of all Nations, 1877.
- Posts and Telegraphs, Past and Present, with an Account of the Telephone and Phonograph, 1878. 1
- Shakespeare and his Contemporaries, together with the Plots of his Plays, Theatres, and Actors, 1879.

Trials of Charles 1 and some other regicides 1861.

== Notes ==
Attribution

- This article incorporates text from a publication now in the public domain: Lee, Sidney, ed. (1898). "Tegg, William". Dictionary of National Biography. Vol. 56. London: Smith, Elder & Co.
