= Thomas Tegg =

British bookseller and publisher (1776–1845)

Thomas Tegg (1776–1845) was a British bookseller and publisher. One of his best-known publications is the London Encyclopaedia of 1829 and 1839.

== Early life ==
Tegg was the son of a grocer, born at Wimbledon, Surrey, on 4 March 1776, and was left an orphan at the age of five. He was sent to a boarding school at Galashiels in Selkirkshire. In 1785 he was bound apprentice to Alexander Meggett, a bookseller at Dalkeith. He ran away, sold chapbooks at Berwick, and spent time at Newcastle where he met the wood engraver Thomas Bewick. In Sheffield he obtained employment from Joseph Gales, the proprietor of the Sheffield Register, and encountered Tom Paine and Charles Dibdin. Further wanderings took him to Ireland and Wales, and then, after some years at King's Lynn in Norfolk, he moved to London in 1796.

== London ==
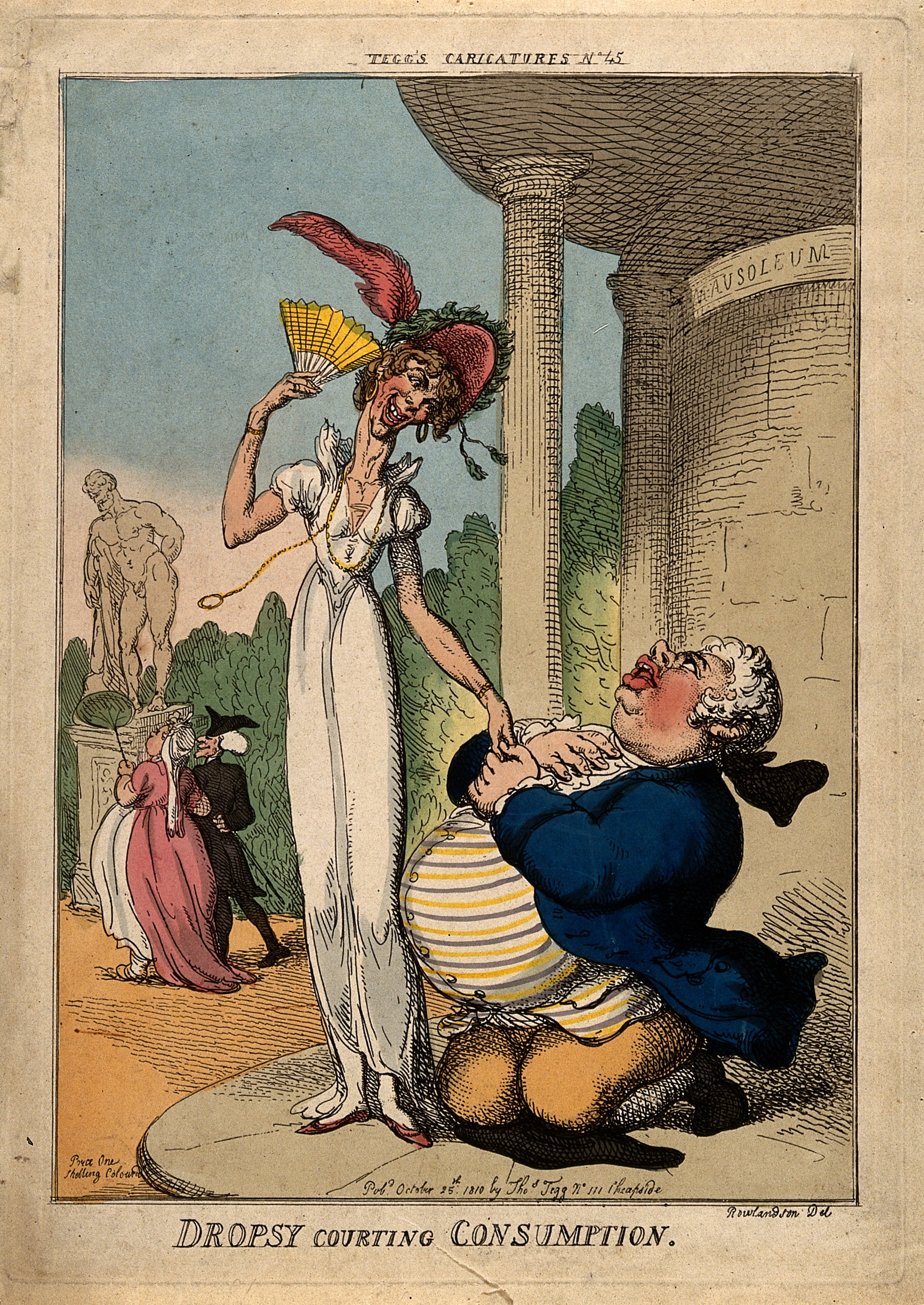
"Dropsy Courting Consumption", published October 25, 1810 in Tegg's Carricatures n° 45, printed at 111 Cheapside

In London he obtained an engagement with William Lane, the proprietor of the Minerva Library, at 53 Leadenhall Street. He subsequently worked for John and Arthur Arch, the Quaker booksellers of Gracechurch Street, where he stayed until he began business on his own account.

Tegg took a shop in partnership with Joseph Dalton Dewick in Aldersgate Street. On 20 April 1800 he married, and opened a shop in St. John Street, Clerkenwell, but lost money through the bad faith of a friend. He took out a country auction licence to try his fortune in the provinces. He started with a stock of shilling political pamphlets and some thousands of the Monthly Visitor. With his wife acting as clerk, he travelled and bought up duplicates in private libraries, clearing his debts.

Returning to London in 1805, he opened a shop at 111 Cheapside. He printed a series of pamphlets, consisting of abridgements of popular works. They proved successful, and he had up to two hundred titles, many of which sold four thousand copies. By 1840 he had published four thousand works on his own account. The Whole Life of Nelson, which he brought out just after the battle of Trafalgar in 1805, sold fifty thousand copies at 6d. and the Life of Mary Anne Clarke (1810), thirteen thousand copies at 7s. 5d. each. In 1824 he purchased the copyright of William Hone's Everyday Book and Table Book, and, republishing it in weekly parts, made a large profit. He then gave Hone £500 to write The Year Book, which proved less successful.

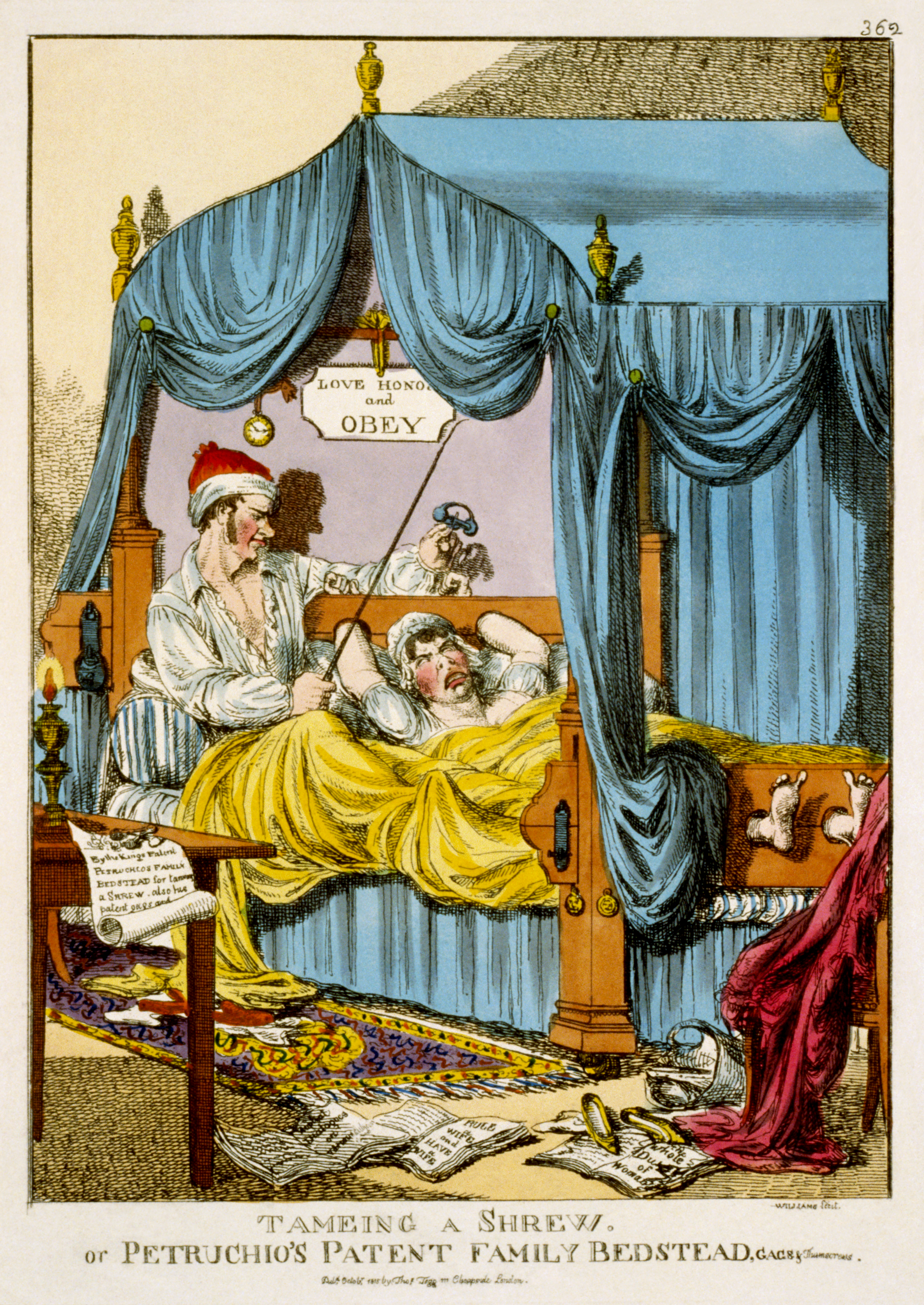
Satirical print from Tegg's Caricature Magazine (1815).

When his own publications began paying well he gave up auctions, which he had continued nightly at 111 Cheapside. In 1824 he made his final move, to 73 Cheapside. In 1825 he started the London Encyclopaedia which ran to twenty-two volumes. He bought remainders on a large scale. He was mentioned as a populariser of literature in Thomas Carlyle's petition on the copyright bill in April 1839.

In 1835, being then a common councilman of the ward of Cheap, he was nominated an alderman, but was not elected. In 1836 he was chosen Sheriff of London; he paid the conventional fine to escape serving, of £400, and added another £100, founding a Tegg scholarship at the City of London School and donating a collection of books.

He died on 21 April 1845, and was buried at Wimbledon. He was generally believed to have been the original of Timothy Twigg in Thomas Hood's 1834 novel Tylney Hall.

== Family ==
Tegg left three sons, including Thomas Tegg, a bookseller, who died on 15 September 1871 and William (1816–1895), who continued the business.

== Works ==
His first short book, The Complete Confectioner, reached a second edition. Tegg was also author of:

- Memoirs of Sir F. Burdett, 1804.
- Tegg's Prime Song Book, bang up to the mark, 1810; third collection, 1810; fourth collection, 1810.
- The Rise, Progress, and Termination of the O. P. War at Covent Garden, in Poetic Epistles, 1810.
- Chronology, or the Historical Companion: a register of events from the earliest period to the present time, 1811; 5th edition 1854.
- Book of Utility or Repository of useful Information, connected with the Moral, Intellectual, and Physical Condition of Man, 1822.
- Remarks on the Speech of Serjeant Talfourd on the Laws relating to Copyright, 1837.
- Handbook for Emigrants, containing Information on Domestic, Mechanical, Medical, and other subjects, 1839.
- Extension of Copyright proposed by Serjeant Talfourd, 1840.
- Treasury of Wit and Anecdote, 1842.
- A Present to an Apprentice, 2nd edition 1848.

He also edited the twelve numbers of The Magazine of Knowledge and Amusement, 1843–4.

=== A London Encyclopaedia ===
- A London Encyclopaedia, or Universal Dictionary of Science, Art, Literature and Practical Mechanics, London: Thomas Tegg, 1829, OCLC 3392197, OL 20423366M
  - v.2 America to Arsenal, v.3 Arsenic to Belswagger, v.4 Benedict to Cadiz, v.5 Caffraria to Clepsydra, v.6 Clergy to Customs, v.7 Cutlery to Elasticity, v.8 Elasticity to Ezra, v.9 F to Garter, v.10 Gas to Halley, v.11 Halo to Indulgence, v.12 Ink to Lindsey, v.13 Line to Medici, v.14 Medicine to Mithridates, v.15 Mithridates to Nox, v.16 Nubia to Perambulator, v.17 Perception to Post, v.18 Potash to Rome v.19 Rome to Seduction, v.20 Seduction to Sphere
- A London Encyclopaedia... @Google Books
  - (1829) Vol.2 America to Arsenal, Vol.3 Arsenic to Bell, Vol.4 Benedict to Cadiz, Vol.5 Caffraria to Clepsydra, Vol.7 Cutlery to Elasticity, Vol.8 Elasticity to Ezra, Vol.9 F to Garter, Vol.11 Halo to Indulgence, Vol.12 Infanticide to Lindus, Vol.14 Medicine to Mithradates, Vol.15 Mithradates to Nox, Vol.16 Nubia to Perambulator, Vol.17 Perception to Post, Vol.18 Potash to Rome, Vol.19 Rome to Seduction, Vol.20 Seduction to Sphere, Vol.21 Spheroid to Tewkesbury, Vol.22 Thales to Zypaeus
  - (1839) Vol.2 America to Arsenal, Vol.3 Arsenic to Bell, Vol.4 Benedict to Cadiz, Vol.5 Caffraria to Clepsydra, Vol.6 Clergy to Customs, Vol.7 Cutlery to Elasticity, Vol.8 Elasticity to Ezra, Vol.9 F to Garter, Vol.10 Gas to Halley, Vol.12 Ink to Lindsey, Vol.14 Medicine to Mithradates, Vol.15 Mithradates to Nox, Vol.17 Perception to Post, Vol.18 Potash to Rome

== Book series ==
- The Family Library (1835–1841) - this series had been originally published by John Murray as Murray's Family Library (1829–1835)
- Gems From British Poets
- The History of Modern Europe...
- Howard's Beauties of Literature (AKA The Beauties of Literature, Consisting of Classic Selections from the Most Eminent British and Foreign Authors)
- The Modern Traveller: A Description of the Various Countries of the Globe
- Uncle Philip's Conversations
- Whittingham's Cabinet Library

== Print series ==
- Tegg's Caricatures
