= Message in a bottle =

Form of communication

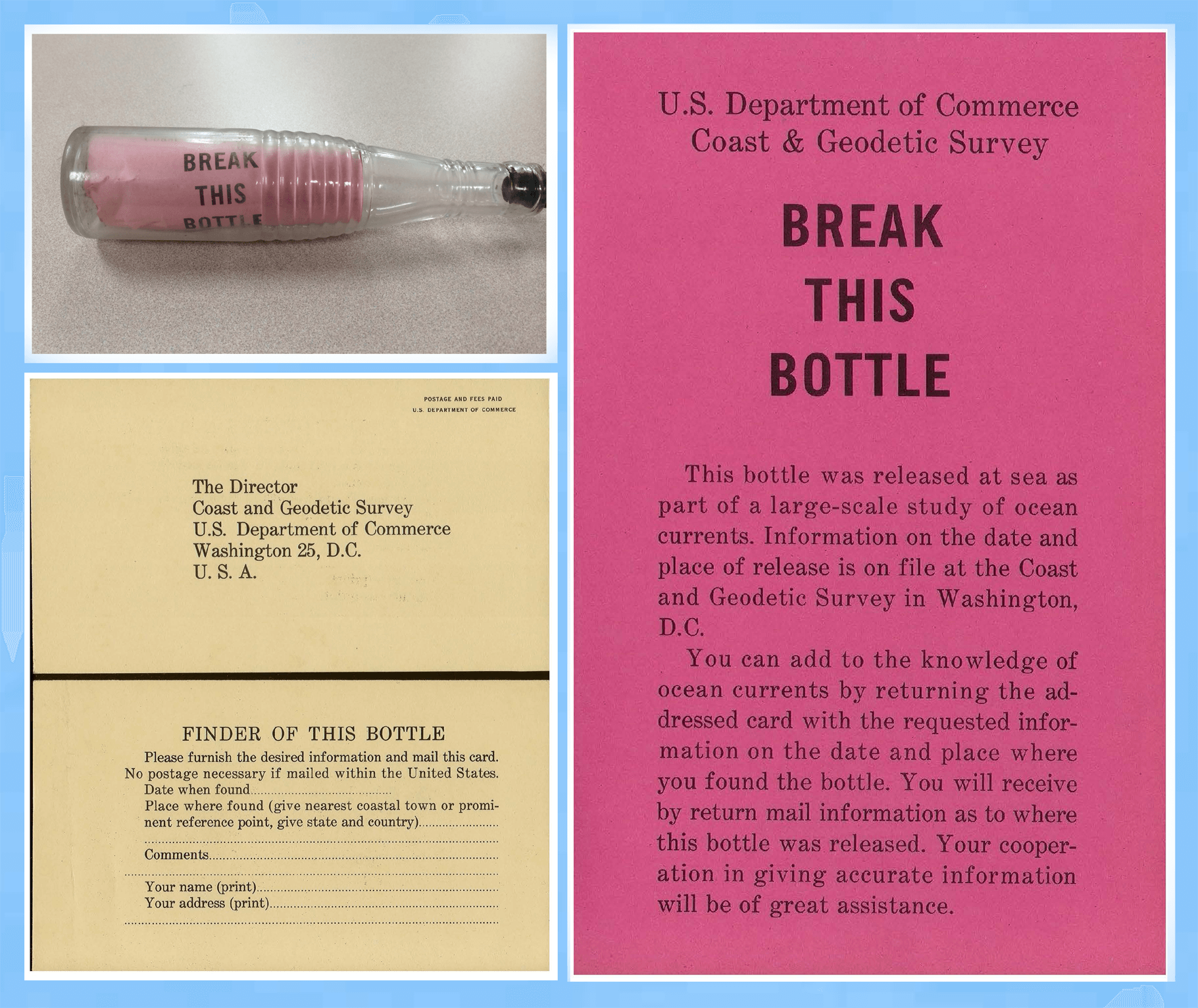
This bottle and its contents (sample postcard and insert shown above) were launched in 1959 by the United States Coast and Geodetic Survey and were found in 2013.

A message in a bottle (MIB), message bottle, or bottled message is a form of communication in which a message is sealed in a container (typically a bottle) and released into a conveyance medium (typically a body of water).

Messages in bottles have been used to send distress messages; in crowdsourced scientific studies of ocean currents; as memorial tributes; to send deceased loved ones' ashes on a final journey; to convey expedition reports; and to carry letters or reports from those believing themselves to be doomed. Invitations to prospective pen pals and letters to actual or imagined love interests have also been sent as messages in bottles.

The lore surrounding messages in bottles has often been of a romantic or poetic nature.

Use of the term "message in a bottle" has expanded to include metaphorical uses or uses beyond its traditional meaning as bottled messages released into oceans. The term has been applied to plaques on craft launched into outer space, interstellar radio messages, stationary time capsules, balloon mail, and containers storing medical information for use by emergency medical personnel.

With a growing awareness that bottles constitute waste that can harm the environment and marine life, environmentalists tend to favor biodegradable drift cards and wooden blocks.

== History and uses ==
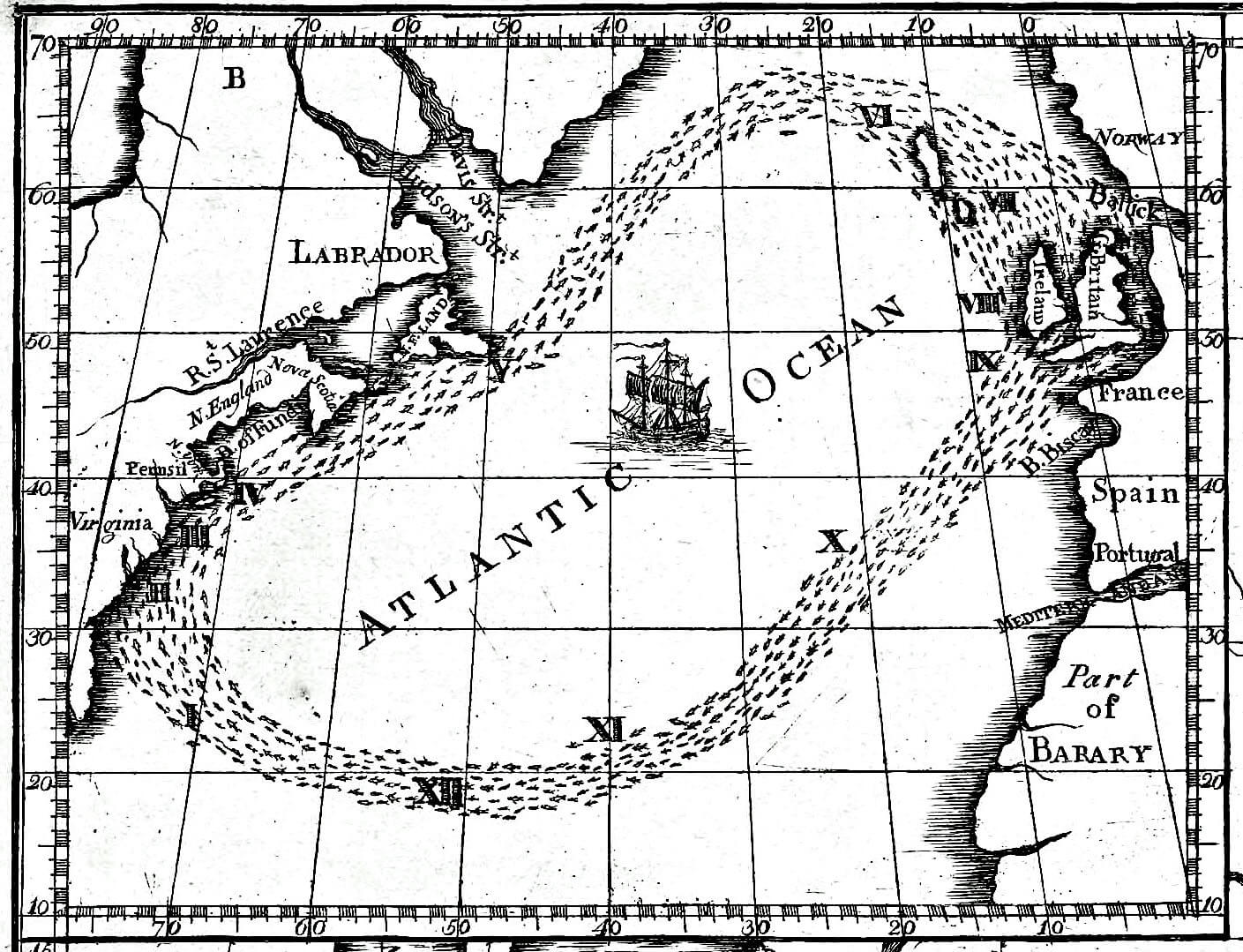
This late-1700s ocean circulation map was based on the work of Benjamin Franklin and James Poupard after conducting drift bottle experiments, apparently still unaware of the Gulf Stream's origin in the Gulf of Mexico.

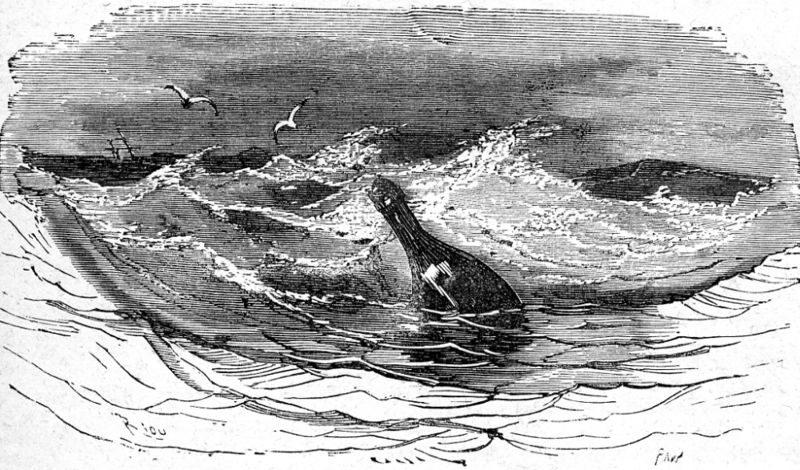
This romanticized Édouard Riou drawing of a message in a bottle was included in Jules Verne's 1860s book In Search of the Castaways.

Bottled messages may date to about 310 BC, in water current studies reputed to have been carried out by Greek philosopher Theophrastus. The Japanese medieval epic The Tale of the Heike records the story of an exiled poet who, in about 1177 AD, launched wooden planks on which he had inscribed poems describing his plight. In the sixteenth century, Queen Elizabeth I reputedly created an official position of "Uncorker of Ocean Bottles", and—thinking some bottles might contain secrets from British spies or fleets—decreed that anyone else opening the bottles could face the death penalty. (However, it has been argued that this is a myth.) In the nineteenth century, literary works such as Edgar Allan Poe's 1833 "MS. Found in a Bottle" and Charles Dickens' 1860 "A Message from the Sea" inspired an enduring popular passion for sending bottled messages.

Scientific experiments involving drift objects—more generally called determinate drifters—provide information about currents and help researchers develop ocean circulation maps. For example, experiments conducted in the mid-1700s by Benjamin Franklin and others indicated the existence and approximate location of the Gulf Stream, with scientific confirmation following in the mid-1800s. Using a network of beachcomber informants, rear admiral Alexander Becher is believed to be the first (from 1808–1852) to study travel of so-called "bottle papers" around an ocean gyre (a large circulating current system). In the late 1800s, Albert I, Prince of Monaco determined that the Gulf Stream branched into the North Atlantic Drift and the Azores Current. In the 1890s, Scottish scientist T. Wemyss Fulton released floating bottles and wooden slips to chart North Sea surface currents for the first time. Releasing bottles designed to remain a short distance above the sea bed, British marine biologist George Parker Bidder III first proved in the early twentieth century that deep sea currents flowed from east to west in the North Sea and that bottom feeders prefer to move against the current.

The United States Coast and Geodetic Survey (USC&GS) used drift bottles from 1846 to 1966. More recently, technologies involving satellite tags, fixed current profilers and satellite communication have permitted more efficient analysis of ocean currents: at any given time, thousands of modern "drifters" transmit current position, temperature, velocity, etc., to satellites, thus avoiding conventional drift bottles' dependence on serendipitous finds and cooperation by conscientious citizens.

Drift bottle studies have provided a simple way to learn about non-tidal movement of waters containing eggs and larvae of commercially important fishes, for sharing among fisheries scientists and oceanographers. Such experiments simulate the travel of pollutants such as oil spills, study the formation of ocean gyre garbage patches such as the Great Pacific Garbage Patch, and suggest travel paths of invasive species. Persistent currents are detected to allow ships to ride favorable currents and avoid opposing currents. Projected travel paths of navigation hazards, such as naval mines, advise safer shipping routes. Even in inland waterways, drifters wirelessly deliver real-time data on water quality, GPS location, and water velocity, for early warning against flash floods, measuring pollution run-off, and monitoring algal blooms.

Outside science, people have launched bottled messages to find pen pals, "bottle preachers" have sent "sermon bottles", propaganda-bearing bottles have been directed at foreign shores, and survivors have sent poetic loving tributes to departed loved ones or sent their cremated remains (ashes) on a final journey.

It was estimated in 2009 that since the mid-1900s, six million bottled messages had been released, including 500,000 from oceanographers.

== Bottle design and recovery rates ==
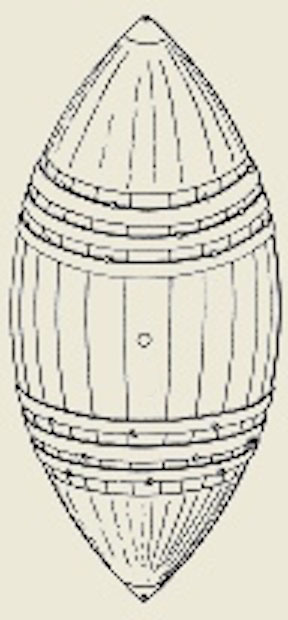
Floating wood-and-metal "drift casks" launched from northern Alaska in 1899–1901 reached Siberia, Iceland and Norway, becoming the first human-made objects to transit the Northwest Passage.

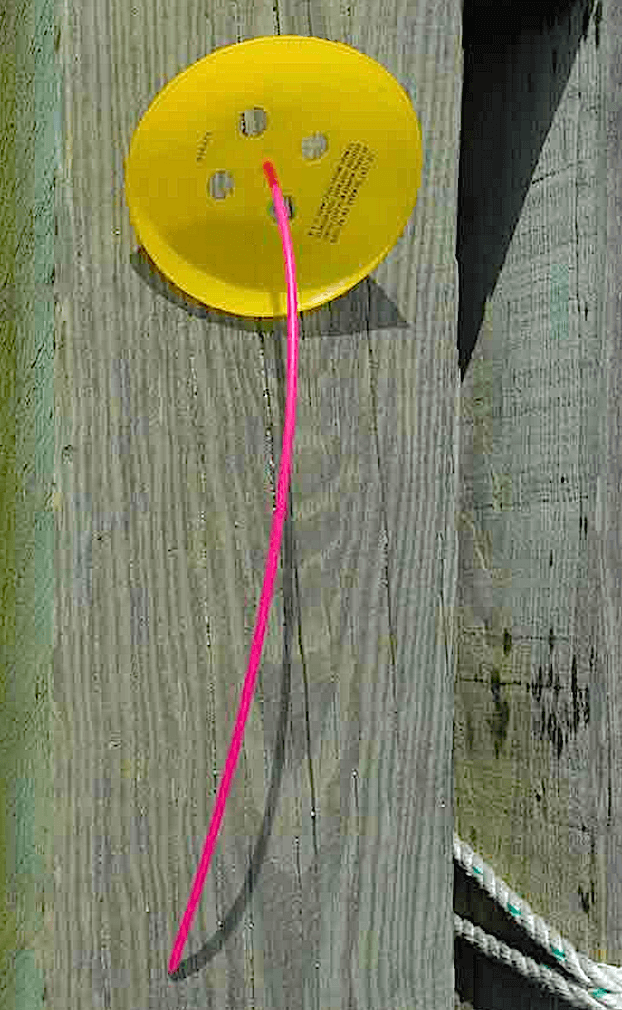
This 1960s-era seabed drifter includes a descending ballast stem to allow a more buoyant disk to remain just above the seabed to be carried by bottom currents. An imprinted message offers a small reward for reporting the time and place the drifter was found.

Some bottles are ballasted with dry sand so that they float vertically at or near the ocean surface, and are less influenced by winds and breaking waves than other bottles that are purposely not ballasted. Wooden blocks float higher in the water and thus are more influenced by wind—a design specially suited for simulating travel paths of plastic waste that is less dense than glass containers.

An early-20th-century "bottom" (or seabed) drift bottle design by George Parker Bidder III involved weighting a bottle with a long copper wire that causes it to sink until the wire trails upon the sea bottom, at which time the bottle tends to remain a few inches above the bottom to be moved by the bottom current. A mushroom-shaped seabed drifter design has also been used. Seabed drifters are designed to be scooped up by a trawler or wash up on shore.

Water pressure pressing on the cork or other closure was thought to keep a bottle better sealed; some designs included a wooden stick to stop the cork from imploding. Vessels of less scientific designs have survived for extended periods, including a baby food bottle a ginger beer bottle, and a 7-Up bottle.

A low percentage of bottles—thought by some to be less than 3 percent—are actually recovered, so they are released in large numbers, sometimes in the thousands. Reported recovery rates for large-scale scientific studies vary based on the ocean of release, and range from 11 percent (Woods Hole, 156,276 bottles from 1948 to 1962, Atlantic), to 10 percent (Woods Hole, 165,566 bottles from 1960 to 1970, Atlantic), to 3.4 percent (Scripps Institution, 148,384 bottles from 1954 to 1971, Pacific). Oceanographic drift card recovery rates have ranged from 50 percent if released in densely populated areas (North Sea, Puget Sound) to 1 percent in uninhabited areas (Antarctica). Recovery rates decrease as bottles are released further from shore, with oceanographer Curtis Ebbesmeyer developing a rule of thumb that bottles released more than 160 kilometres (100 miles) from shore have recovery rates below 10 percent, and "only a few percent" of those released more than 1,600 kilometres (1,000 miles) from shore are recovered. About 90 percent of marine debris washes up on less than 10 percent of the world's coastlines, favoring beaches perpendicular to the dominant ocean current. Objects with similar buoyancy characteristics tend to collect together.

A Scripps scientist said that marine organisms grow on the bottles, causing them to sink within eight to ten months unless washed ashore earlier. An unknown number are found but not reported.

== Time and distance ==
Some drift bottles were not found for more than a century after being launched.

Drift bottles and seabed drifters
provide only a birth notice and an obituary –
with no biography.

— 1973, Dean F. Bumpus, Senior Scientist
Woods Hole Oceanographic Inst.

Floating objects may ride gyres (large circulating current systems) that are present in each ocean, and may be transferred from one ocean's gyre to another's. Further, objects may be sidetracked by wind, storms, countercurrents, and ocean current variation. Accordingly, drift bottles have traveled large distances, with drifts of 6,500–9,700 kilometres (4,000–6,000 miles) and more—sometimes traveling 160 kilometres (100 miles) per day—not uncommon. Bottles have traveled from the Beaufort Sea above northern Alaska and northwestern Canada to northern Europe; from Antarctica to Tasmania; from Mexico to the Philippines; from Canada's Labrador Sea and Baffin Bay to Irish, French, Scottish, and Norwegian beaches; from the Galapagos Islands to Australia; and from New Zealand to Spain (practically antipodes). Based on empirical data collected since 1901, a computer program called OSCURS (Ocean Surface Current Simulator) digitally simulates motion and timing of floating objects in and between ocean gyres.

Despite being launched substantial time periods before being found, some bottles have been found physically close to their original launch points, such as a message launched by two girls in 1915 and found in 2012 near Harsens Island, Michigan, U.S., and a ten-year-old girl's message launched into the Indian River Bay in Delaware, U.S. in 1971 and found in adjacent Delaware Seashore State Park in 2016.

== Historical examples ==
Historical examples are listed in chronological order, based on year of recovery (when applicable):

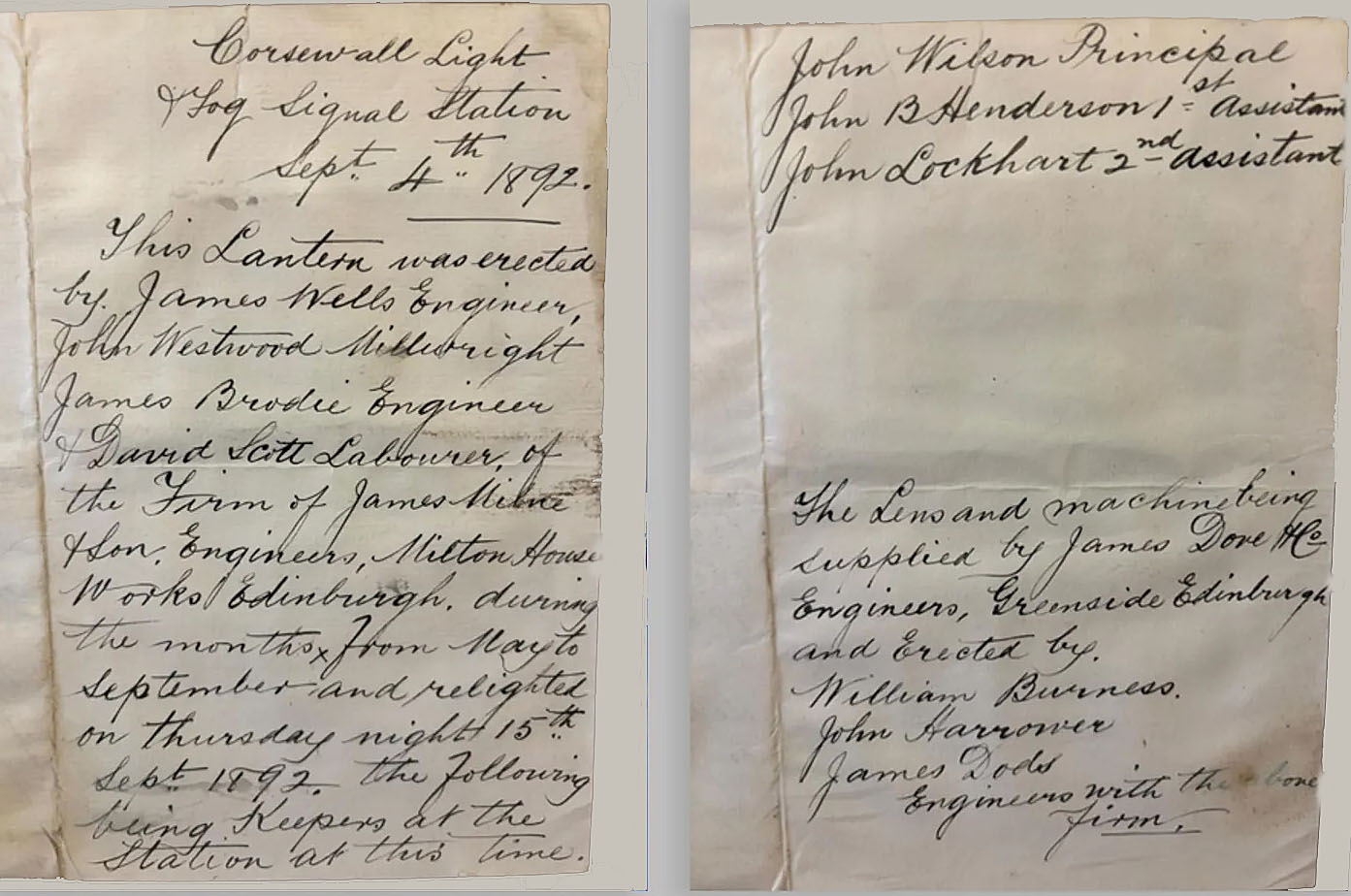
Some bottled messages have been placed on land rather than in a body of water. This 1892 quill-and-ink commemoration of Scottish lighthouse engineers was discovered in the walls of a Scottish lighthouse in 2024.

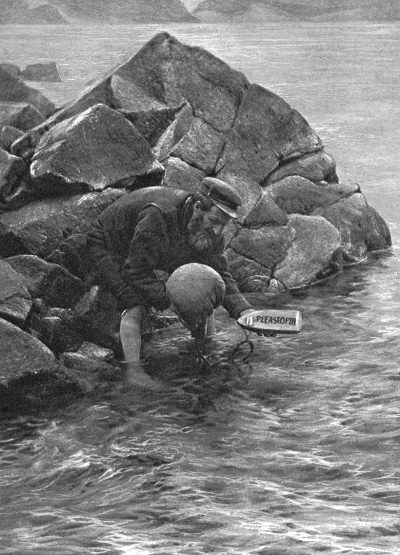
A man launches a "St Kilda mailboat" from the isolated island about 175 kilometres (110 miles) northwest of the Scottish mainland, ca. 1898. Usually formed of sheepskin bladders providing flotation for boat-shaped enclosures for letters, the "mailboats" reached Scotland with some degree of reliability, and also to Scandinavia.

=== Early examples ===
- It is reputed that about 310 BC, Aristotle's protégé Greek philosopher Theophrastus used bottled messages to determine if the Mediterranean Sea was formed by the inflowing Atlantic Ocean.
- When Christopher Columbus encountered a severe storm while returning from America, he is said to have described on parchment what he had found in the New World and requested it be forwarded to King Ferdinand and Queen Isabella. He is said to have enclosed the parchment in a waxed cloth and placed it into a large wooden barrel that was cast into the sea. The communication was never found.
- On April 15, 1841, the Wellington, W.C. Kendrick, Commander, bound "from Madras and Cape bound to London", launched a bottled message in the mid-Atlantic (at 13° N) "for the purpose of throwing some light on the ocean currents".
- In 1847, from the brig Eagle laden with corn for the starving Irish in Waterford, Ireland, master Gregg dropped a bottled message with his location (42.40N, 54.10W) on March 27, requesting the find be sent to the Nautical Magazine (London) for publication to provide information on Atlantic currents. The bottle was retrieved on July 20 by Capt. Robert Oke on the revenue cutter Caledonia off the coast of Newfoundland (46.36N, 55.30W).
- In 1856, a bottle was found on the Hebrides coast, Scotland, containing a note stating a ship, believed to be the SS Pacific, had sunk after a collision with an iceberg.
- In February 1862, the Bashford Hall "sent afloat a message in a bottle describing her perilous state." However, she arrived safely at Falmouth, England on March 6, 1862.
- After the January 11, 1866, sinking of the SS London in the Bay of Biscay, bottled messages—reported as "farewell messages from passengers... to friends and relatives in England"—were reportedly found in months following.
- In 1875, ship's steward Van Hoydek and cabin boy Henry Trusillo of the British sailing ship Lennie released 24 bottled messages into the Bay of Biscay, telling of the murder by mutineers of their captain and officers. French authorities soon received the message, rescued Hoydek and Trusillo, and brought the mutineers to justice.
- In 1876, on the remote Scottish island of St Kilda, freelance journalist John Sands and marooned Austrian sailors deployed two messages requesting the Austrian Consul rescue them with provisions. The messages, each enclosed in a cocoa tin attached to a sheep's bladder for flotation in an arrangement later called a "St. Kilda mail boat", were discovered in Orkney within nine days and in Ross-Shire after 22 days. Since that time, sending "St. Kilda mail" has become a recreational ritual for island visitors, the containers often riding the Gulf Stream to the British mainland, Shetland, Orkney and Scandinavia.

=== 20th century ===
- Message-bearing bottles from Titanic (1912) and Lusitania (1915) have been widely recounted as fact, but even before these bottles were found The Irish News stated in April 1912 that "very many" such stories turn out to be "cruel hoaxes".
- In February 1916, when German Zeppelin L 19 experienced unfavorable weather, battle damage and multiple engine failure after attacking the British Midlands, its commander's last message to superiors and the crew's final letters to relatives were released into the North Sea to be found on a Swedish coast six months later. The written descriptions of how a British fishing trawler had refused to rescue the downed Zeppelin's crew—the trawler captain claiming he feared the German airmen would overpower his own unarmed crew—contributed to an enduring international controversy.
- In 1924, five survivors of the Mary A. Bolling of Philadelphia, shipwrecked along the Indian Ocean, threw a message in a bottle asking for help. The bottle was found in Belgium a year later.
- On December 23, 1927, Frances Wilson Grayson, niece of U.S. President Woodrow Wilson, prepared to attempt to be the first woman to make a transatlantic flight (non-solo). Her Sikorsky amphibian plane disappeared en route from New York's Long Island to Harbour Grace, Newfoundland, her attempt's launching point, and was never found. A bottled message was found in Salem Harbor, Massachusetts, in January 1929, the unauthenticated message reading, "1928, we are freezing. Gas leaked out. We are drifting off Grand Banks. Grayson."
- In December 1928, a trapper working at the mouth of the Agawa River, Ontario, found a bottled note from Alice Bettridge, an assistant stewardess in her early twenties who initially survived the December 1927 sinking in a blizzard of the freighter Kamloops. She later succumbed but before she perished, wrote "I am the last one left alive, freezing and starving to death on Isle Royale in Lake Superior. I just want mom and dad to know my fate."
- In 1929, a bottle that came to be known as the Flying Dutchman was released by a German marine science expedition with instructions for any finders to report the find but return the bottle to the sea. Found at several locations in succession, the Flying Dutchman traveled 25,750 kilometres (16,000 miles) from its release point in the southern Indian Ocean, to Cape Horn in South America, and back through the Indian Ocean to its last reported find in 1935 on the west coast of Australia.
- On the night of March 28, 1941 in the last moments of the Battle of Cape Matapan, aboard the sinking cruiser Fiume, Italian sailor Francesco Chirico wrote a farewell message and threw it overboard in a bottle. Chirico's message, including a note, "Please give news to my dear mother that I die for the homeland...", was found in 1952 near Villasimius, Sardinia.
- On January 7, 1943, a Schweppes lemonade bottle was found near Woolnorth in northwestern Tasmania, containing a penciled message thrown overboard on April 17, 1916, by Australian soldier John Oppy as his troop ship passed between Encounter Bay and Kangaroo Island, South Australia. Oppy himself survived to see the message returned.

The notion of the message in a bottle has come to attain a kind of romanticism, built perhaps on the allure of the exotic mystery its contents might reveal from a faraway place or a long-ago time.

— Paul Brown, Messages From the Sea
- On Christmas Day 1945, 21-year-old medical corpsman Frank Hayostek threw a message-laden aspirin bottle from his Liberty ship as it approached New York, the bottle being found eight months later near Dingle, County Kerry, by Irish milkmaid Breda O'Sullivan. Her mailed reply began a correspondence that inspired Hayostek to save money for airfare to visit O'Sullivan in 1952. Intense media attention for the "impossibly romantic story", including Time magazine stories, overshadowed their two-week visit, the two parting but corresponding until they married other people in 1958 and 1959. Media attention endured through the sixtieth anniversary of their meeting, 2–3 years after their deaths.
- In 1955, a bottle from a 1903 German Antarctic expedition was found in New Zealand, about 5,500 kilometres (3,400 miles) from its launch point between the Kerguelen Islands and Tasmania; however, hydrographers surmise it had drifted around the world many times.
- In 1955, Swedish sailor Åke Viking (Note: Some sources give the sailor's surname as Wiking, the variant preferred before the 1889 Swedish spelling reform.) sent a bottled message "To Someone Beautiful and Far Away" that reached a then 15-year-old Sicilian girl named Paolina Puzzo, sparking a correspondence that culminated in their marriage in 1958. The affair attracted so much attention that 4,000 people celebrated their wedding. Paolina and Åke remained married until Åke's death in 2001.
- In 1959 Guinness Brewery launched 150,000 bottles into the Atlantic Ocean and Caribbean Sea in a promotional campaign. It was reported that Inuit hunters on Coats Island, in Canada's Hudson Bay, found 80 of the bottles.
- In 1969, a Canadian scientific expedition dropped a message bottle through a hole in the drift ice at the approximate North Pole. The bottle was found in 1972 in northeast Iceland.
- In May 1976, National Geographic World magazine released 1,000 bottles—250 per week—from the cruise ship Song of Norway, with instructions in five languages to fill out and return cards, in order to help map ocean currents.
- In 1978, a Russian researcher discovered a bottled message in the Franz Josef Land, north of mainland Russia, that was deposited by Karl Weyprecht, leader of the 1872–1874 Austro-Hungarian North Pole Expedition which sought a Northeast Passage.
- A message that an American couple released from a cruise ship approaching Hawaii in 1979 was found off Songkhla Beach, Thailand by a former South Vietnamese soldier and his family as they fled that country's communist regime by boat. A correspondence relationship began in 1983, and the couple worked with U.S. Immigration to help the Vietnamese family obtain refugee status in 1985 and move to the U.S.
- In 1991, a bottled message found on Vancouver Island, Canada, urged the release of Chinese dissident Wei Jingsheng. According to oceanographer Curtis Ebbesmeyer, the bottle was likely released in 1980 near Quemoy Island, one of many Taiwan propaganda bottles launched toward mainland China.
- In what was described as "perhaps the most famous message in a bottle love story", in March 1999 a green ginger beer bottle was dredged up by a fisherman off the Essex coast, the bottle containing an 84-year-old letter tossed into the English Channel on September 9, 1914, by British soldier Private Thomas Hughes days before he was killed in fighting in France. Hughes' letter, written for delivery to his wife who had died in 1979, was delivered instead to his then 86-year-old daughter in New Zealand by the fisherman himself, who with his own wife was flown to New Zealand at the expense of New Zealand Post.

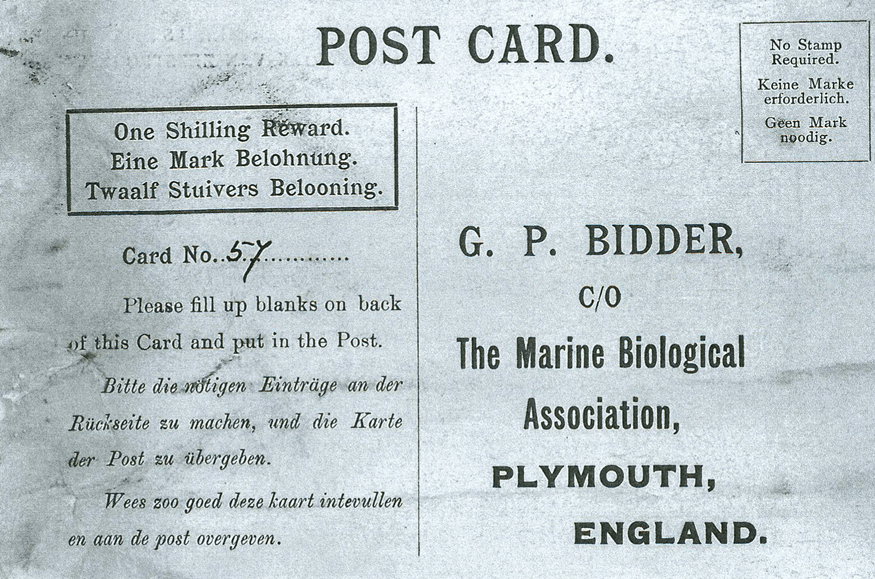
This postcard, inserted into a bottle launched by the Marine Biological Association of the U.K. circa 1906, was found in 2015.

=== 21st century ===
- A teardrop-shaped bottle was found in March 2002 on a beach in Kent, England, containing an unsigned letter from a French woman expressing her enduring grief over the death of her son at age 13. British author Karen Liebreich spent years of research, unsuccessfully trying to find the mother and eventually publishing a book called The Letter in the Bottle (2006). The book was published in French in 2009, sparking huge media coverage that alerted the mother for the first time that her letter had actually been discovered. Saying she initially felt violated by publication of her personal suffering, on condition of continued anonymity, she agreed to tell Liebreich the details of her son's 1981 death in a bicycle accident, her decades of suffering afterwards, and the story surrounding release of her letter from an English Channel ferry.
- In May 2005, three days after eighty-eight migrants were abandoned by human smugglers on a disabled boat, the migrants tied an SOS-bearing bottle to a long line of a passing fishing vessel, whose captain alerted authorities to rescue the migrants.
- On December 10, 2006, a bottom drift bottle, released on April 25, 1914, northeast of the Shetland Islands by the Marine Laboratory, Aberdeen, U.K., was recovered by a Shetland fisherman, after the bottle had spent over 92 years at sea.
- In February 2008, a family beachcombing at Eucla, Western Australia discovered a bottle with a message from one John Blissett, a crew member of the schooner Patanela, which disappeared in mysterious circumstances off the coast of Botany Bay on the 8th of November, 1988. The authenticity of the message was confirmed by Marjorie Blissett, John's mother.
- In October 2011 in waters off Somalia, the crew of the pirated cargo ship Montecristo used a bottle with a flashing beacon to alert NATO ships that they had retreated to an armored room, permitting a military rescue operation to proceed with knowledge that the crew was not being held hostage.
- In April 2012 a fisherman recovered a bottom drift bottle that had been released 98 years earlier, on June 10, 1914, one of 1,890 released by the Glasgow School of Navigation to test undercurrents in the seas around Scotland. The 2012 find occurred east of Shetland by the Copious, the same fishing vessel involved in the 2006 find.
- In a 2013 promotional campaign, Norwegian soft drink company Solo released a 26-foot, 2.7-ton replica soda bottle outfitted with a customized camera, navigation lights, an automatic identification system, a radar reflector, and GPS tracking technology, all powered by solar panels. The craft drifted from Tenerife, Canary Islands, while broadcasting its location, but its electronics were stolen by pirates before its five-month trip terminated at Los Roques archipelago near Venezuela.
- In April 2013, a kite-surfer near the mouth of Croatia's Neretva River recovered a bottle containing a message purporting to have been sent in 1985 from Nova Scotia to fulfill a promise by a "Jonathon" to write to one "Mary". The message received international media attention.
- In March 2014, a fisherman on the Baltic Sea near Kiel recovered a drift bottle containing a Danish postcard dated May 17, 1913, and signed by a then-20-year-old baker's son named Richard Platz, who asked for it to be delivered to his Berlin address. Researchers located Platz's granddaughter, by then 62, and delivered the 101-year-old message to her, Platz himself having died in 1946.

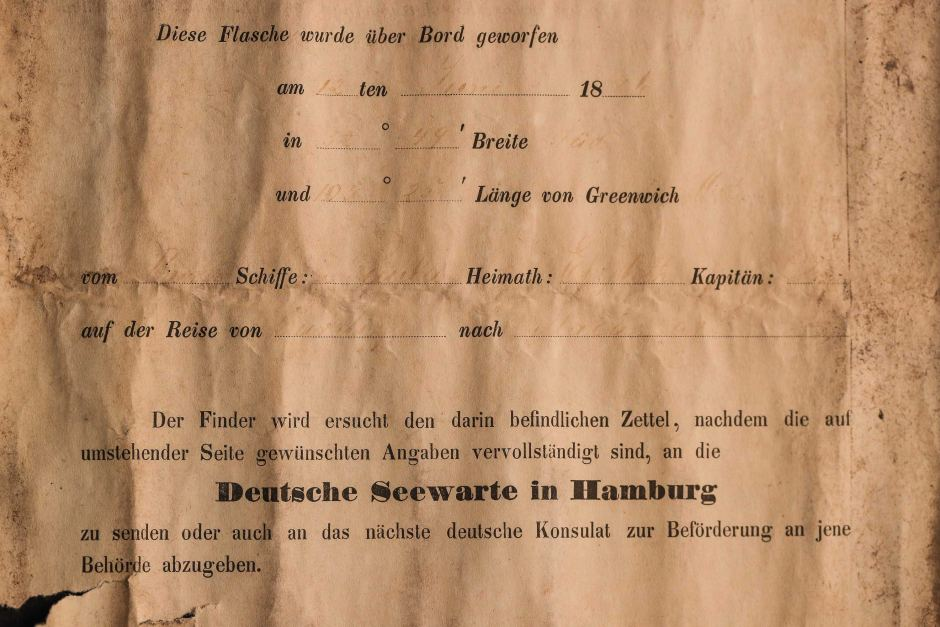
This bottled message, released June 12, 1886, from a German sailing vessel in the Indian Ocean as part of a drift bottle study, was found on a beach in Western Australia in 2018.

- An April 2015 find on the North Sea island of Amrum, Germany, of a 108-year-old bottle sent by the Marine Biological Association of the United Kingdom in Plymouth, was one of 1,020 released into the North Sea between 1904 and 1906 by former association president George Parker Bidder III.
- In 2016, Cuban migrants who had fled Cuba in a homemade boat, launched a bottled SOS message complaining of their treatment while being detained for 42 days aboard a United States Coast Guard Cutter.
- In late 2016, a barnacle-encrusted, kelp-tangled GoPro video camera was recovered, the camera's memory card preserving footage showing the prelude to the camera's being swept overboard four years earlier, and also recording its first two hours underwater off Fingal Bay, Australia.
- In 2017, a small unmanned boat made by high school students and having solar panels, sensors and camera, drifted on an unexpected path from near Maine, to approach Spain and Portugal, then drift westward back into the Atlantic and northward to be discovered in Benbecula in the western isles of Scotland. The boat had a waterproof pod containing a chip that collected sensor data.
- In July 2017, a Scottish widower seeking female companionship set 2,000 bottled messages adrift at various locations around the U.K., and though claiming he received responses from 50 women, ceased the practice in response to public complaints and an investigation by the Scottish Environment Protection Agency.
- In January 2018, a couple walking on a beach in Western Australia discovered a bottled message that had been launched on June 12, 1886, from the German barque Paula conducting drift bottle experiments for the German Naval Observatory. The message's authenticity was corroborated through the ship captain's original Meteorological Journal, and, at 131 years' duration, eclipsed the previous corroborated record duration of 108 years. The bottle's thick glass and its opening's narrow bore are thought to have protected the paper from the elements.
- In the summer of 2018, a bottled typewritten message dated March 26, 1930, was discovered in the roof of the twelfth-century Goslar Cathedral in Goslar, Germany, signed by four roofers who bemoaned the economic state of that country. The bottle was discovered by a roofer who was the grandson of one of the signatories, who had been an 18-year-old roofing apprentice in 1930. Goslar's mayor replaced the bottle with a copy of the 1930 message, adding his own confidential message.
- In May 2019, a Gatorade bottle with a four-page letter, written in Spanish, was found in Brown Bay, near Mount Gambier, South Australia. The letter had been sent from Caleta Córdoba, near Comodoro Rivadavia, Argentina by a mother and two children as a loving tribute to their husband and father who had died of a stroke a year earlier.
- In June 2019, three hikers trapped above a waterfall on California's Arroyo Seco tributary released a Nalgene bottled SOS message that was quickly discovered a quarter mile (0.4 km) downstream, allowing them to be rescued by helicopter the following morning.
- In late 2019, a bottled message launched on August 1, 1994, by 12-year-old Ryan Mead was found near the mouth of the Taramakau River, New Zealand, the find occurring mere months after Mead died at age 37 in a freak accident inhaling fumes while laying carpet.
- In early 2025, a note was found in a violin crafted by a Polish Jew in the Dachau concentration camp: "Trial instrument, made under difficult conditions with no tools and materials. Dachau. Anno 1941, Franciszek Kempa." The note is interpreted to be that of a master violin maker explaining how he was forced to build an instrument that did not meet his own standards. Kempa survived the Holocaust.
- In July 2025, a message in a bottle was found on Inis Oírr, Galway Bay, Ireland, with a note claiming to be from a crew member of the Taiwanese fishing vessel Yong Yu Sing No. 18 that was abandoned near Midway Atoll (Pacific) in late 2020 or early 2021.

== Long-duration events ==
Table listing long-duration (>25-year) events involving messages in bottles (scroll):

Still-living individuals are not identified by name unless they are independently notable.^{s} denotes stationary messages (placed on land, not in a body of water).
Sender	Date released	Place released	Date found	Place found	Duration (years)	Ref.
Pierre-Jacques Féret	1825-01	Cité de Limes near Dieppe ^{s}	2024-09	Cité de Limes near Dieppe	199	
Chunosuke Matsuyama, seaman	1784	Island in Pacific	1935	Hiraturemura, Japan	151	
James Ritchie and John Grieve	1887-10-06	Edinburgh, Scotland ^{s}	2022-11-13	Under floorboards of house	135	
Lighthouse engineers	1892-09-04	Rhins of Galloway, Scotland (lighthouse) ^{s}	2024-11	Corsewall Lighthouse, Scotland	132	
German sailing barque Paula	1886-06-12	Indian Ocean, 950 km off Western Australia	2018-01	Near Wedge Island, Western Australia	131.6	
Theatre builders	1906–10	King's Theatre, Edinburgh, Scotland ^{s}	2024-12-06	Behind decorative crown	118	
Bricklayers Wm Hanley, James Lennon	1907-07-03	Montclair State University, N.J., US ^{s}	2019	Wall in College Hall	112	
Pte Malcolm Neville and William Harley, Australian soldiers	1916-08-15	Great Australian Bight	2025-10	Wharton Beach, Western Australia	109	
George Parker Bidder, Marine Biological Association of the U.K.	1906-11-30	North Sea	2015-04-17	Amrum, Germany	108	
Karl Weyprecht, co-leader, Austro-Hungarian North Pole expedition	1874	Lamont, Franz Josef Land, Russia ^{s}	1978-08	Lamont, Franz Josef Land, Russia	104	
School administrators	1920-09-30	School cornerstone ^{s}	2024-04	Owatonna High School, Minnesota, U.S.	103.5	
Richard Platz	1913-05-17	Baltic Sea	2014-03	Baltic Sea near Kiel	101	
Glasgow School of Navigation	1914-06-10	Near Scotland	2012-04	East of Shetland	98	
Selina Pramstaller, Tillie Esper	1915	Harsens Island, Michigan, U.S.	2012	Harsens Island, Michigan, U.S.	96	
George Morrow	1926-11	Cheboygan, MI, U.S. (presumed)	2021-06	Cheboygan River	94.6	
Marine Laboratory, Aberdeen	1914-04-25	Near Scotland	2006-12-10	Near Shetland	92	
Erich Sanitter, Waldenburg	1929-07-08	Bay of Danzig, Poland	2019-10	Vistula Lagoon	90	
Willi Brandt, roofer, age 18	1930-03-26	Goslar, Germany ^{s}	2018	Goslar Cathedral roof	88	
Carl Ott (business owner)	1930-05-20	Indianapolis, Indiana, U.S. ^{s}	2017-02	Construction site	86	
Thomas Hughes, WWI soldier	1914-09-09	English Channel	1999-03	Essex, River Thames	84	
Dachau prisoner Franciszek Kempa	1941	Inside violin ^{s}	2025 (before 28 April)	Art dealer in Hungary	83	
"Flying Squad" joinery team	1934-07-16	Viewforth, Edinburgh ^{s}	2016-11	Wall of building	82	
John Stapleton Jr. age 14	1938-09-05	Jersey, Channel Islands (deduced)	2020-02-18	Jersey, Channel Islands	81.4	
Navy of Czarist Russia	1913-07	Sea of Okhotsk, Russia	1995	Near Cordova, Alaska	81	
(undetermined)	1935	Southampton Guildhall, U.K. ^{s}	2016	Southampton Guildhall, U.K.	81	
"Jim" (military man)	1945-03-04	Virginia Beach, Virginia, Va, US	2024-08-07	Odessa, Florida, US	79	
Herbert E. Hillbrick	1936	P&O cruise ship	2012	Ninety Mile Beach, NZ	76	
Victor Elliott, age 13	1944-04-25	Ralston, Oklahoma	2017-11-11	Fort Smith, Arkansas	73	
Lt. Col. Eugene J. McNamara	1948	Grand Hotel, Yokohama ^{s}	2016	New Grand Hotel	68	
Auschwitz prisoners, age 18–20	1944-09-09	Near Auschwitz camp ^{s}	2009-04	Wall of bomb shelter	64	
WHOI	1956-04-26	South of Nova Scotia	2014-01-20	Sable Island	57	
U.S. Bureau of Commercial Fisheries	1962-05	Gulf of Mexico	2019-01	Padre Is. Nat. Seashore, Texas	56.5	
NOAA's NEFSC	1959-09-19	Atlantic, off Massachusetts	2013-12-22	Martha's Vineyard, Mass.	54	
Paul Walker, geologist	1959-07-10	Ward Hunt Island, N. Canada ^{s}	2013	Ward Hunt Island, N. Canada	54	
SS Miss Belmar tour boat mate, 18	1971	50 miles E of Belmar, NJ, US	2025-03	Southern Bahamas	54	
German Antarctic Expedition	1903	Btw. Kerguelen Is., Tasmania	1955	New Zealand	52	
Paul Tsiatsios, motel owner	1960+	New Hampshire, U.S.	2011	Turks and Caicos	51	
Soviet fishing vessel Sulak	1969-06-20	Pacific Ocean	2019-08-05	Shishmaref, Alaska	50	
13-year-old ship passenger	1969-11-17	100 mi. E. of Fremantle, W. Aus.	2019-07	Eyre Peninsula, S. Aus.	49	
Construction workers	1967-05-19	Toowoomba, QLD, Australia ^{s}	2016-09-08	Embedded in concrete	49	
NOAA Fisheries	1966	Bristol Bay, Alaska, U.S.	2013	Cold Bay, Alaska, U.S.	47	
High school science class	1972-12-01	Fire Island, N.Y., U.S.	2019-08	Brookhaven, L.I., N.Y., U.S.	46.7	
"Donkeyman" James Robertson	1970-09-16	North Sea (assumed)	2017-01	Norderney, Germany	46.2	
Girl, age 6	1971-09-06	Indian River Bay, Delaware, U.S.	2016-04-22	Del. Seashore State Park	44	
Boy, age 14	1971-01-15	Cove Bay, Aberdeen, U.K.	2015	Rattray Head, Aberdeenshire	44	
Girl, age 11	1974-08-29	Old Mission Peninsula, Michigan	2015	Old Mission Peninsula, Michigan	41	
Two junior high school girls	1975	Washington state, U.S.	2015-04-04	Gulf of Alaska, U.S.	40	
Print shop worker, age 31	1983	Omaha, Nebraska	2020-03	Rock Port, Missouri	37	
High School Nat. Sci. Club	1984-07	Chōshi, Japan	2021	Hawaiian Paradise Park	37	
Boy, age 16	1980-05-13	Albany, W. Australia	2016-06	Eucla, W. Australia	36	
Vacationer	1981-06-10	Fernandina Beach, Florida	2017-06-17	Little St. Simons Island, Georgia	36	
Scottish schoolgirl, age 12	1994	Portknockie, Moray, Scotland	2025	Lisshelløya island, Vega, Norway	31	
School; Forfar, Scotland	1987 (est)	North Sea	2017-09-29	Key Largo, Fla. U.S.	30	
Girl, age 8	1988-09-26	Edisto Beach, South Carolina	2017-10	Sapelo Island, Georgia	29	
Boy, age 12	1989-07	Detroit River	2017-07-12	Amherstburg, Ontario	28	
"Jonathon"	1985	Nova Scotia (purported)	2013-04-17	Croatia	28	
Father, daughter, age 4	1992	Near Baie Fine, Ontario	2020-03	Hiawatha Isl^{(near Manitoulin Isl, Ont)}	28	
Jack Oppy, Australian soldier	1916-04-17	Between Encounter Bay & Kangaroo Island, S. Australia	1943-01-07	Woolnorth, NW Tasmania	26.7	
Manitoba, Canada resident	1985	Lake Winnipeg	2011	Near Libau, Manitoba	26	
Fifth grade class	1993-05	Delaware River (Kansas)	2019	Chester, Illinois	25	
Ryan Mead, age 12	1994-08-01	Near Greymouth, New Zealand	2019	Mouth of Taramakau River, NZ	25	

== Popular perceptions ==
A hundred billion bottles

washed up on the shore,

Seems I'm not alone at being alone—

A hundred billion castaways

Looking for a home.

— "Message in a Bottle" song lyrics
(The Police, 1979)

Besides interest in citizen science drift-bottle experiments, message-in-a-bottle lore has often been of a romantic or poetic nature. Such messages have been romanticized in literature, from Edgar Allan Poe's 1833 story "MS. Found in a Bottle" through Nicholas Sparks' 1998 Message in a Bottle. Clint Buffington, subject of the 2019 documentary short film The Tides That Bind / A Message in a Bottle Story, surmised in an interview with The Guardian that sending a bottled message expresses a hope to find connection in a fear-filled world.

In Newsweek Ryan Bort recounted various historical messages as being cries for help, or "final, poetic words of resignation left behind for (an) indifferent sea", or from "lonely, lovelorn souls, searching for serendipity", or a search for "affirmation ... that comes from somewhere other than yourself". Bort described sending a message in a bottle as a romantic act that has "such a delicious potential for magic" or as "surrendering a part of yourself to something larger", concluding that "every message in a bottle is a prayer".

Finding a bottled message has generally been viewed positively, the finder of a 98-year-old message referring to his find as winning the lottery. However, intense media attention over a personal relationship that resulted from one woman's find, is said to have caused her to remark that had she known what would happen, she would have left the bottle on the beach. Another woman said she initially felt shocked and violated by publication of the personal suffering she had expressed in a bottled letter that she never expected would be found or read.

== Similar methods using other media ==
Messages sent into interstellar space

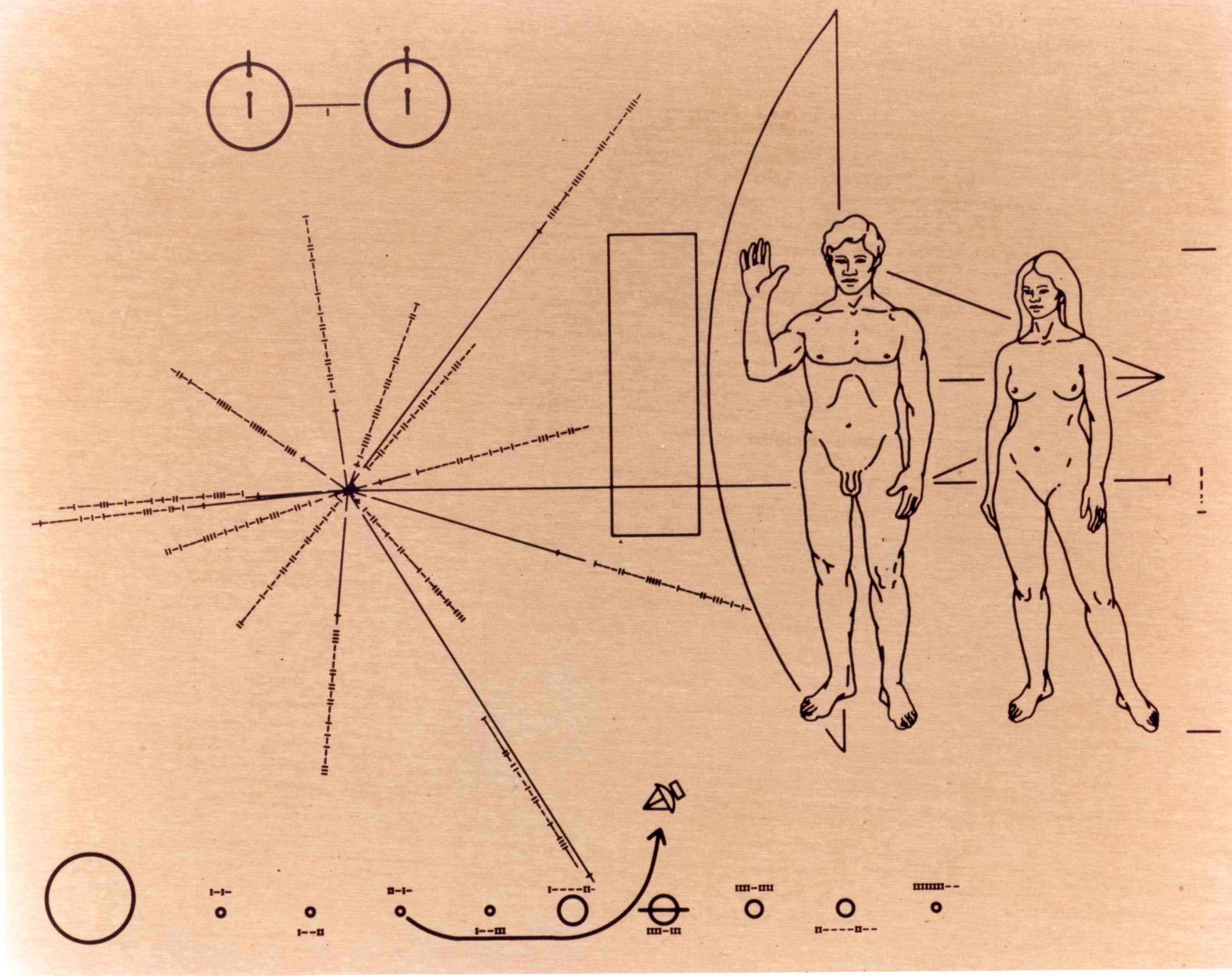
The Pioneer plaque (1972, 1973)

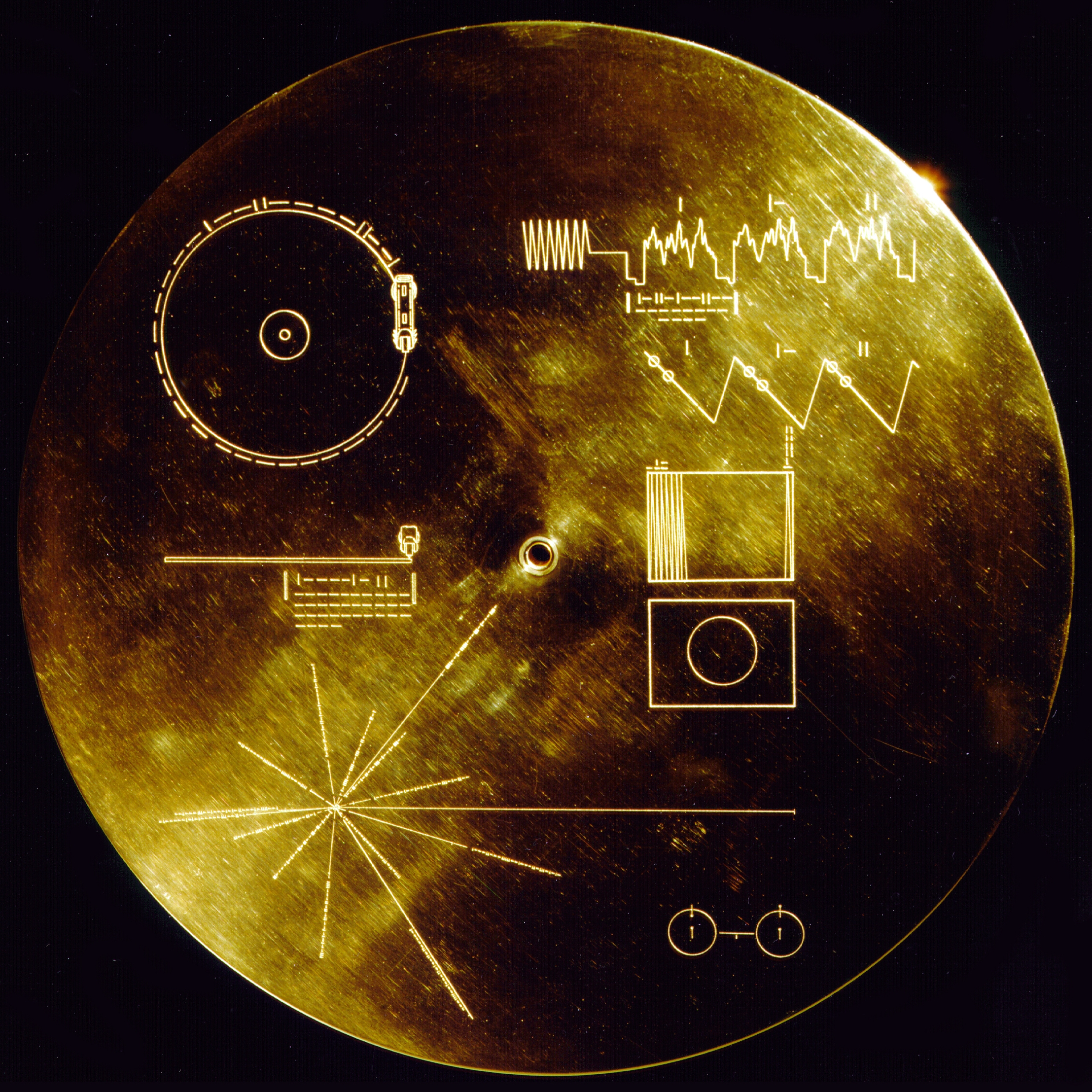
The Voyager Golden Record (1977) contained images and encoded sounds

The term "message in a bottle" has been applied to techniques of communication that do not literally involve a bottle or a water-based method of conveyance, such as the Europa Clipper plaque (2024), the Pioneer plaque (1972, 1973), the Voyager Golden Record (1977), and even radio-borne messages (see Cosmic Call, Teen Age Message, A Message from Earth), all directed into space.

Balloon mail involves sending undirected messages through the air rather than into bodies of water. For example, during the Prussian Siege of Paris (1870–1871) about 2.5 million letters were sent by hot air balloon, the only way Parisians' letters could reach the rest of France.

Stationary time capsules have been termed "messages in a bottle", such as a 1935 message in a lemonade bottle correctly portending difficult times, which was found in 2016 by masons restoring damaged Portland stone at Southampton Guildhall. A geologist left a bottled message in 1959 in a cairn on isolated Ward Hunt Island (Canada, 83°N latitude), allowing its finders in 2013 to determine that a nearby glacier had retreated over 60 metres (200 ft) in the intervening 54 years. More durable examples of time capsules are the Westinghouse Time Capsules of the 1939 and 1964 New York World's Fairs, intended to be opened 5,000 years after their creation.

Prisoners from the Auschwitz concentration camp concealed bottles containing sketches and writings that were found after World War II.

Certain emergency medical services urge patients to record information describing their medical conditions, medications and drug allergies, emergency contacts, as well as advance healthcare directives for when the patients are incapacitated or suffer from dementia or learning difficulties, and place the record as a special "message in a bottle" stored in (conventionally) a refrigerator, where paramedics can quickly locate it.

== Environmental issues ==
Plastic bottles are known to constitute plastic marine pollution, and eventually break down into smaller pieces because of ultraviolet light, salt degradation or wave action. Glass bottles can break into sharp-edged pieces, and bottle caps are ingested by sea birds.

Some agencies continue to use drift bottles into the 21st century, but with increased awareness that man-made floating items can harm marine life or constitute waste material, biodegradable drift cards and biodegradable wooden drifters with non-toxic ink are gaining favor.

== See also ==
- Beachcombing
- Drifter (oceanography)
- Earth's black box
- Flotsam, jetsam, lagan and derelict
- Friendly Floatees, plastic bath toys accidentally released in the Pacific in 1992
- Ice rafting
- Swallow float
