= Portugal Current =

Weak ocean current that flows south along the coast of Portugal

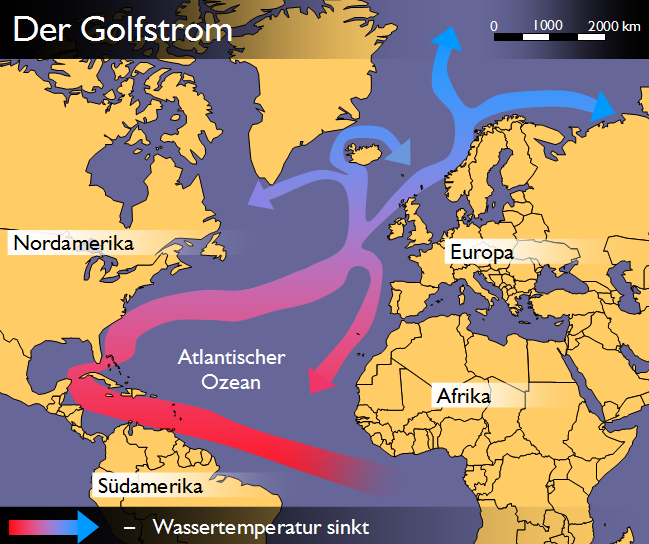
North Atlantic currents

The Portugal Current is a weak ocean current that flows south along the coast of Portugal and the Iberian Peninsula. Some publications define this current as part of the Canary Current, while others distinguish it as a separate current.

The Portugal Current system is supplied mainly by the intergyre zone in the Atlantic, a region of weak circulation between the North Atlantic Current to the north and the Azores Current to the south. It is estimated, on average, to extend about 300 km beyond the shelf.

It is also influenced by the more dominant neighboring Canary and Azores Currents, marking the northern extent of the Canary current. Other significant influences include seasonal winds, freshwater runoff from the Iberian Peninsula, the bottom topography found along the continental shelf break and slope, and the three main underlying water masses that are found below the seasonally variable surface layer.

General water temperatures are between 14 and 19 °C (57 and 66 °F), depending on whether upwelling (cooler water) or downwelling (warmer waters) dominates, though sea surface temperatures on the shelf have been observed to reach up to 24 °C (75 °F) in the summer and remain between 18 and 10 °C (64 and 50 °F) in the winter.

Meddies (eddies composed of Mediterranean water) are also present, particularly in the region of the Tagus Abyssal Plain (about 11-13°W; 37-39°N) and along the shelf break and also occur in some Portuguese capes: Portimão Canyon, Cape St. Vincent, Estremadura Promontory and Cape Finisterre, although some appear to come from the Espinho slope.

Upwelling conditions are favourable from the beginning of April to the end of September (peaking in July and averaging 188 days) and downwelling from the beginning of October to the end of March (averaging 177 days), particularly January and February, due to dominant wind stress along the Iberian margin, although upwelling can occasionally occur in downwelling-favourable months and vice versa, mainly due to wind variability.

== Concerns about climate change ==
From 1941 onwards, sea surface temperature offshore Portugal has been observed to rise > 0.01 °C per year. This trend has put some seaweed species, such as Laminaria hyperborea, a kelp with an affinity for cooler water, with its distribution shifted northwards. It had its southern distribution limit at Peniche in the 1970s and 1980s, but is now only limited to waters off northern Portugal, providing further support to the notion of a reduction of kelp forests along the Iberian Peninsula. This increase in temperature is correlated with the decrease in the intensity of upwelling events from 1941 onwards, reducing the input of nutrient-enriched waters into the coast. Warm water species are colonizing new areas northwards while cold water species are shifting polewards, like the rustic limpet (Patella rustica).
