= DBCP (disambiguation) =

DBCP, or 1,2-Dibromo-3-chloropropane, is the active ingredient in the nematicide Nemagon, also known as Fumazone.

DBCP may also refer to:

- Data Buoy Cooperation Panel, of which Global Drifter Program is a project
- Database connection pooling services, in Apache Commons
