= Niiler =

Niiler is an Estonian surname. Notable people with the surname include:

- Herbert Niiler (1905–1982), Estonian American basketball player and coach
- Pearn P. Niiler (1937–2010), American oceanographer
