= Pearn =

Pearn is a surname. Notable people with this surname include:

- Cole Pearn (born 1982), Canadian driver
- Inez Pearn (1913–1976), British novelist
- Jon Pearn, English house music producer
- Kris Pearn, Canadian animation director
- Mark Pearn (born 1977), English field hockey player
- Nancy Pearn, founder of Pearn, Pollinger & Higham
- Perry Pearn (born 1951), Canadian ice hockey coach

== As a given name ==
- Pearn P. Niiler (1937–2010), American oceanographer
