= Float (oceanography) =

Oceanographic instrument platform used for making subsurface measurements in the ocean

Basic parts of a typical profiling float

A float (not to be confused with a drifter) is an oceanographic instrument platform used for making subsurface measurements in the ocean without the need for a ship, propeller, or a person operating it. Floats measure the physical and chemical aspects of the ocean in detail, such as measuring the direction and speed of water or the temperature and salinity. A float will descend to a predetermined depth where it will be neutrally buoyant. Once a certain amount of time has passed, most floats will rise back to the surface by increasing its buoyancy so it can transmit the data it collected to a satellite. A float can collect data while it is neutrally buoyant or moving through the water column. Often, floats are treated as disposable, as the expense of recovering them from remote areas of the ocean is prohibitive; when the batteries fail, a float ceases to function, and drifts at depth until it runs aground or floods and sinks. In other cases, floats are deployed for a short time and recovered.

== History ==
Floating devices with neutral buoyancy were developed independently and simultaneously by Henry Stommel in 1955 and John C. Swallow in 1955. However Swallow's design was the first practical one. The design of the Swallow float allows it to stabilize itself at a given depth.

By late 2004 over 1500 neutrally buoyant floats were drifting at various depths of ocean waters.

== Construction ==
These autonomous drifting vehicles typically have aluminum pressure cases on the order of one meter long. To change the buoyancy, a pump is used to inflate or deflate an external oil bladder. Some floats can detach a ballast to increase its buoyancy, but that can only be done once. The weight of a float is about 20 kg without sensors. Floats can carry a variety of sensors to collect data. A common sensor used is a CTD to collect data about the conductivity, temperature, and depth (which is related to pressure). The salinity can be calculated from the measurements taken by the CTD. Other sensors used include oxygen, nitrate, sunlight, chlorophyll, and pH sensors. Acoustically tracked floats have a hydrophone on them to produce sound. Without the sensors, a float can cost about $25,000 US.

== Profiling floats ==
Profiling floats, such as APEX floats, SOLO floats (including SOLO-TREC), PROVOR floats, and Navis floats (Sea-Bird Scientific), change their buoyancy in order to move vertically through the water column in the ocean to repeatedly collect data that spans a range of depths ("profiles"). Profiling floats can have more than one sensor of the same type on it. A sensor on top of the float will collect data better than one on the bottom if the float is moving vertically through the water column, and a sensor on the bottom will collect data better if the float is descending. These floats are capable of making a few hundred profiles to a maximum depth of 2000 meters before battery exhaustion, and transmit their data to shore via satellite communication each time they surface. Deeper diving models that can reach 6000 meters have been made, deep enough to reach the ocean floor in most locations. A major user of profiling floats is the Argo program, which aims to keep 3000 of them functioning in the ocean at any given time.

=== Apex floats ===
The Argo program uses Apex floats. These floats drift at a set depth for a period of 5 to 10 days before surfacing to transmit the data to satellites. The float will then descend back to the determined depth.

=== Lagrangian floats ===
A Lagrangian float is similar to a Lagrangian drifter in that it is designed to follow a parcel of water, except that the Lagrangian float is capable of changing its buoyancy to collect profile data as well. By following a parcel of water, measurements have the advective effects of water minimized to show the change of the properties of the water parcel over time.

=== Coastal floats ===
Although the coastal regions of the world are the most productive parts of the ocean, floats are not commonly used to study the coast. Floats in coastal regions are less common due to the risk of the floats being damaged by the coast or being washed ashore. A newer model for a coastal float is being developed by the Monterey Bay Aquarium Research Institute (MBARI). These new floats sit on the seafloor between profiles. This allows the floats to resist being moved by the currents when it is not collecting data. The coastal float would collect profile data more frequently than Argo floats due to the rapidly changing coastal environment.

== Non-profiling floats ==
Some floats are designed only to map currents at a single depth; they don't have the ability to adjust their buoyancy, so are carefully ballasted to match the water density at the desired depth. A modern example of this type is the RAFOS float; historical versions include Swallow, ALACE, and SOFAR floats.
