= Canary Current =

Wind-driven surface current that is part of the North Atlantic Gyre

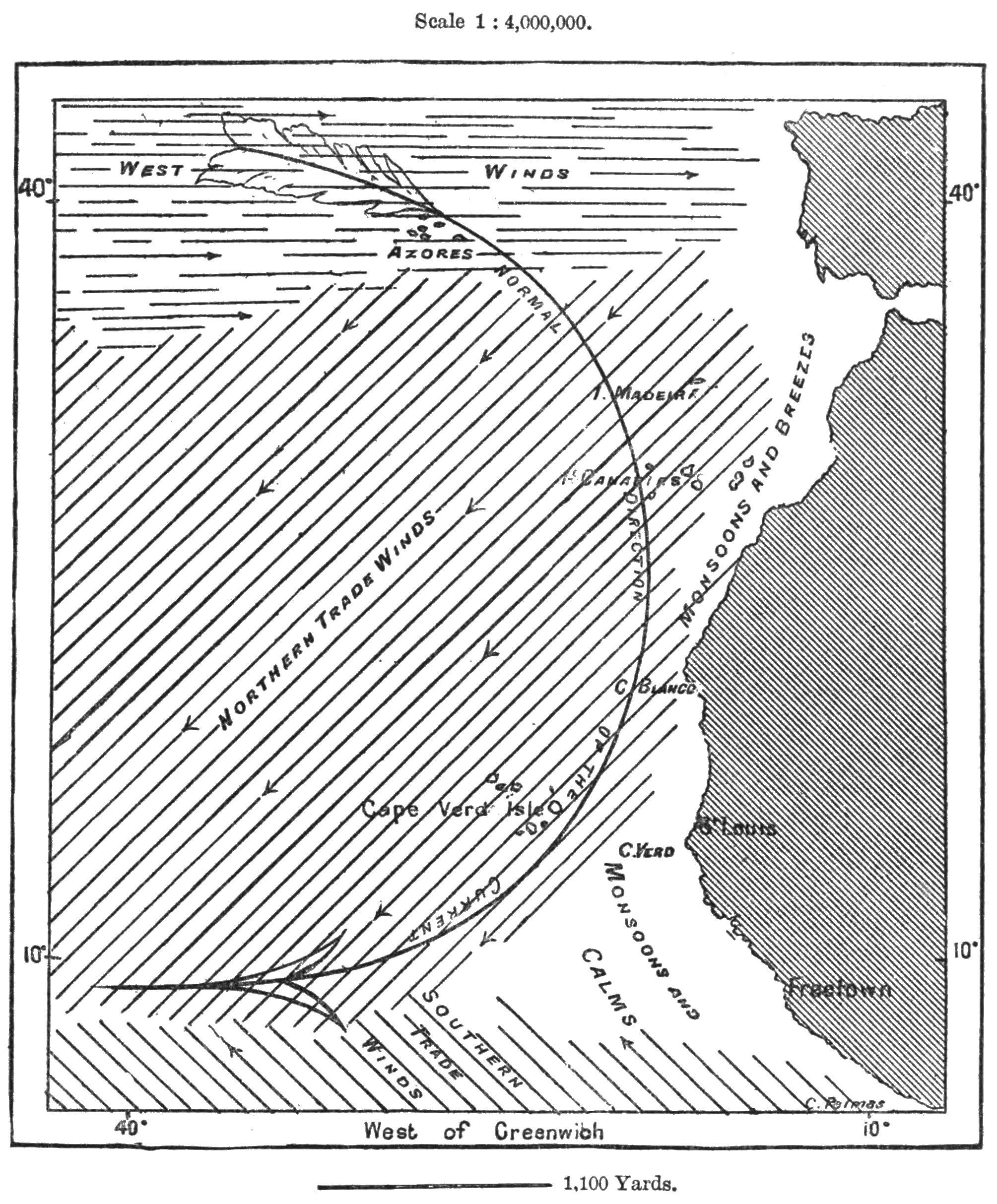
The vertical Canary Current

The Canary Current is a wind-driven surface current that is part of the North Atlantic Gyre. This eastern boundary current branches south from the North Atlantic Current and flows southwest about as far as Senegal where it turns west and later joins the Atlantic North Equatorial Current. The current is named after the Canary Islands. The archipelago partially blocks the flow of the Canary Current (Gyory, 2007).

This wide and slow moving current is thought to have been utilized in the early Phoenician navigation and settlement along the coast of western Morocco and Old Spanish Sahara. The ancient Phoenicians not only exploited numerous fisheries within this current zone, but also established a factory at Iles Purpuraires off present day Essaouira for extracting a Tyrian purple dye from a marine gastropod murex species.

The current heavily influences the weather of the Canaries and coastal Morocco and Western Sahara, cooling down shoreline temperatures for much of the year and also causing vast deserts on coastlines due to the absence of convection above the cool water. Winds from the vast Saharan Desert to the east may still bring hot temperatures also to coastal areas.

== See also ==
- Portugal Current
- Christopher Columbus
- Madeira
- Elmina Castle
- Voyages of Christopher Columbus
- Eastern boundary current
