= John C. Swallow =

English oceanographer

John Crossley Swallow
- Born: 11 October 1923
- Died: 3 December 1994 (aged 71)

John Crossley Swallow FRS (11 October 1923 – 3 December 1994) was an English oceanographer who invented the Swallow float (sometimes referred to as a neutral buoyancy float), a scientific drifting bottle based on the messages in bottles that shipwrecked sailors hoped would reach inhabited shores, summoning assistance.

He was elected a Fellow of the Royal Society in 1968. He candidature citation read: "Dr. J.C. Swallow is internationally known both for his distinguished geophysical work on the voyages of H.M.S. "Challenger", and for his measurements of deep ocean currents. He is the inventor of the "Swallow float", a hydrostatically stable, freely drifting source of sound underwater, which can be followed by a ship at the surface. By numerous observations with this ingenious device, he and others have completely changed our picture of the deep circulation of the ocean, showing the presence of strong deep currents in the western North Atlantic, and a reverse flow beneath the Gulf Stream. He has recently contributed to our knowledge of the equatorial undercurrent and of other currents in the Indian Ocean. Dr. Swallow combines a devotion to his work and a careful attention to detail with a mastery of the practical handling of a research ship at sea. The quality and originality of his contributions has already been recognized in the U.S.A. by the award of the Bigelow Medal and of the Albatross Award of the American Miscellaneous Society."

== Swallow's invention ==
Swallow designed his float to reach neutral buoyancy at a desired mid-water depth. The float emitted noises that could be tracked from a ship, allowing observation of the current velocity at the depth of the float. This ability to measure subsurface currents contributed to knowledge of the circulation patterns of the ocean.

== Honors and awards ==
- 1962 Henry Bryant Bigelow Medal of the Woods Hole Oceanographic Institution
- 1994 Henry Stommel Medal of the Woods Hole Oceanographic Institution

== See also ==
- RAFOS float
- Drifter (floating device)
- Ice rafting
