= Paula (1876 barque) =

German sailing ship

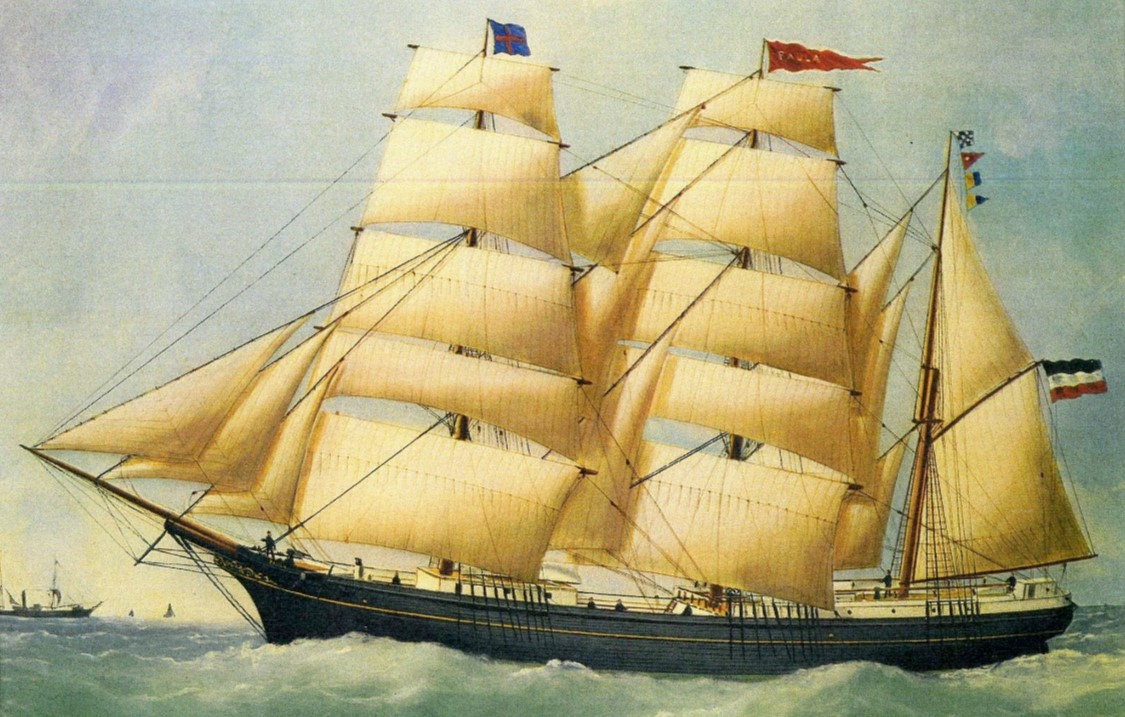
- Paula: Artist Édouard Adam

History

Germany
- Name: Paula
- Owner: A Schiff & Co.
- Port of registry: Elsfleth
- Builder: Lüring Yard, Hammelwarden
- Launched: April 1876
- Identification: Code Letters NFKG; German Official Number 4277
- Fate: Last listed 1890

General characteristics
- Class & type: Sailing ship
- Tons burthen: 515 56/94 bom; 533 GRT
- Length: 38.48 metres (126 ft 3 in)
- Beam: 8.31 metres (27 ft 3 in)
- Draught: 4.88 metres (16 ft 0 in)
- Depth: 4.95 metres (16 ft 3 in)
- Propulsion: Sails
- Sail plan: Barque

Paula was a barque built in 1876 in Hammelwarden, Germany.

She participated in a Deutsche Seewarte experiment investigating ocean currents by means of distributing messages in bottles. A bottle dropped by Paula in the Indian Ocean in 1886 was discovered in January 2018 north of Wedge Island, Western Australia.

== Description ==
Paula was 38.48 metres (126 ft 3 in) long with a beam of 8.31 metres (27 ft 3 in). She had a depth of 4.95 metres (16 ft 3 in) and a draught of 4.88 metres (16 ft 0 in). She was assessed at 515 56/94 tons bom, 533 GRT. She was rigged as a barque.

== History ==
Paula was built in April 1876 at the Lüring Yard, Hammelwarden, Germany for A Schiff & Co. The Code Letters NFKG and German Official Number 4277 were allocated. Her port of registry was Elsfleth. Paula was last listed in the American shipping registers in 1890. She was not listed in 1891.

=== Message in a bottle find ===
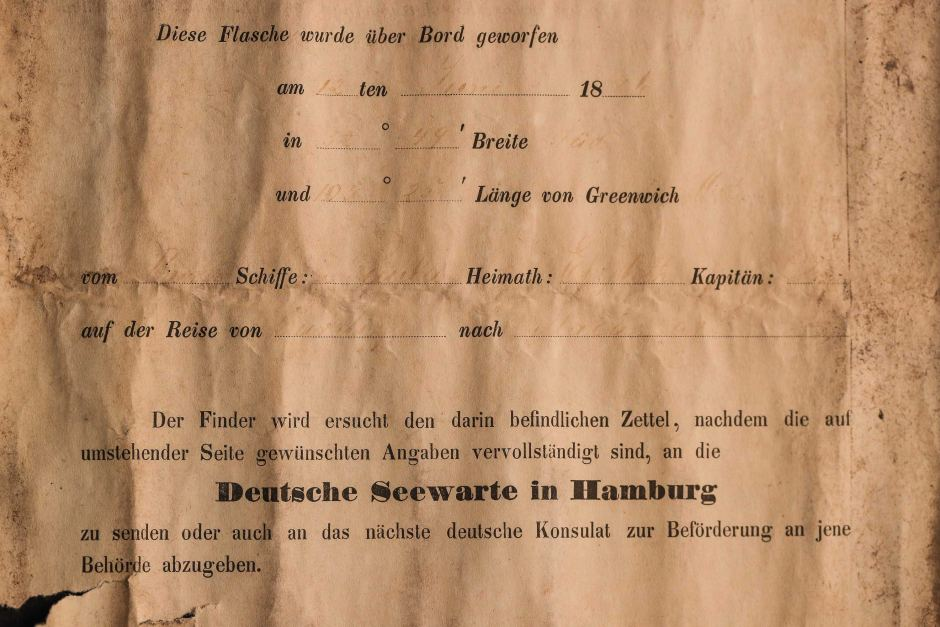
Paula's message in a bottle released on June 12, 1886, and found on 21 January 2018.

On 12 June 1886, a message in a bottle was dropped from Paula during a voyage from Cardiff, Wales, United Kingdom to Makassar, Dutch East Indies. The bottle was dropped in the Indian Ocean at 32°49′S 105°25′E.

On 21 January 2018, the bottle was discovered north of Wedge Island, Western Australia, about 510 nautical miles (940 km) away. The finders contacted the Western Australian Museum who investigated the discovery. They confirmed that the bottle had been dropped as part of an experiment by the German Naval Observatory (Deutsche Seewarte) to determine ocean currents. The bottle and its message were analysed and found to be authentic to the period. The hand-made bottle had originally contained jenever and had come from Schiedam, South Holland, Netherlands.

The previous discovery of a bottle from the programme had been in January 1934 in Denmark. The 131 year time-to-retrieval exceeds the Guinness Book of Records-listed record for the longest such time of 108 years.
