= Frank Hayostek =

United States Navy sailor

- Born: 11 June 1924
- Died: 15 November 2009 (aged 85)
- Known for: Making a message in a bottle that travelled from New York to Ireland
- Spouse: (m. 1958; died 1965)
- Children: 1

Frank Hayostek (June 11, 1924 – November 15, 2009) was an American veteran of World War II who gained international notoriety for throwing a message in an aspirin bottle that travelled all the way from the New York harbour to Dingle, Ireland. The event became a media circus on both sides of the Atlantic.

On Christmas, 1945, Medical Corpsman Frank Hayostek returned by sea from military duty in France. Feeling lonesome, he stuffed a note into an aspirin bottle, corked it and tossed it over the side of the SS James Ford Rhodes. The note read: "Dear Finder, I am an American soldier . .. 21 years old . . . just a plain American of no wealth, but just enough to get along with. This is my third Christmas from home . . . God bless you."

Eight months later, Hayostek received a response from Breda O'Sullivan, 18-year-old resident of Lispole. The pair became pen pals and over the course of the next seven years they exchanged 70 letters. In the summer of 1952, Hayostek travelled to County Kerry to finally meet O'Sullivan. His two-week stay was shadowed by a flock of reporters and photographers who "tried to fan the romance into flame."

The publicity was too much for the shy O'Sullivan, who would later describe the notoriety as "gruelling," and Hayostek returned to Pennsylvania without her. In 1958, he married a local girl and had a son named Terry Francis Hayostek. The following year, he received his last letter from Breda. His wife died in 1965 from cancer.

The Tribune Democrat rekindled the story in 2004.

Frank Hayostek died on November 15, 2009, at the age of 85.

In 2012, to coincide with the 60th anniversary of Frank's trip to Ireland, RTÉ Radio (Irish National Radio) announced it was making a documentary titled 'Message in a Bottle' for its award-winning Doc on One series. It was revealed on this programme that Frank had told Breda he had been previously married and had the marriage annulled. Breda then spurned him as she held very strong Catholic views on marriage.
