= SOLO-TREC =

The SOLO-TREC (Sounding Oceanographic Lagrangrian Observer Thermal RECharging) is a profiling float that uses a novel thermal recharging engine powered by the natural temperature differences found at different ocean depths to cycle up and down in the ocean. The research and prototype were developed by researchers at the Jet Propulsion Laboratory in Pasadena, California, and the Scripps Institution of Oceanography in San Diego. The project name stands for "Sounding Oceanographic Lagrangrian Observer Thermal RECharging" vehicle.

== History ==
Research and technology development for SOLO-TREC began in 2004 with funding provided by JPL Research & Technology Development program (2005–2007) and the Office of Naval Research (2008–2010). On November 30, 2009, the first SOLO-TREC prototype was deployed 161 kilometers southwest of Honolulu by a group of scientists and engineers from JPL and Scripps.

== Design ==
The original prototype weighed 84 kilograms, dived autonomously to depths of 500 meters, and generated 1.7 watt-hours of energy per dive. SOLO-TREC draws upon the ocean's thermal energy as it alternately encounters warm surface water and colder conditions at depth. Key to its operation are the carefully selected waxy substances known as phase-change materials that are contained in 10 external tubes, which house enough material to allow net power generation. As the float surfaces and encounters warm temperatures, the material melts and expands; when it dives and enters cooler waters, the material solidifies and contracts. The expansion of the wax pressurizes oil stored inside the float. This oil periodically drives a hydraulic motor that generates electricity and recharges the vehicle's batteries. Energy from the rechargeable batteries powers the float's hydraulic system, which changes the float's volume (and hence buoyancy), allowing it to move vertically.

== Recent Developments ==
SOLO-TREC has completed more than 450 dives from the ocean surface to a depth of 500 meters (1,640 feet) and is reporting temperature and salinity profiles three times per day. Designers control the depth to which the instrument dives through its hydraulic system. Its thermal recharging engine produces about 1.7 watt-hours, or 6,100 joules, of energy per dive, enough electricity to operate the vehicle’s science instruments, GPS receiver, communications device and buoyancy-control pump. SOLO-TREC has the potential to replace current ocean monitoring currently done by 3,200 battery-powered Argo floats deployed previously to measure temperature, salinity, and velocity. The US Navy is also exploring the use of thermal recharging technology for the next generation of autonomous submersible vehicles. Scalable for use on most robotic oceanographic vehicles, this technology breakthrough could usher in a new generation of autonomous underwater vehicles capable of virtually indefinite ocean monitoring for climate and marine animal studies, exploration and surveillance.
