= Drifter (oceanography) =

Floating device for tracking currents

A drifter nicknamed holey sock. Typical sensors acquire air pressure, sea surface temperature, irradiance and salinity.

A drifter (not to be confused with a float) is an oceanographic device floating on the surface to investigate ocean currents by tracking location. They can also measure other parameters like sea surface temperature, salinity, barometric pressure, and wave height. Modern drifters are typically tracked by satellite, often GPS. They are sometimes called Lagrangian drifters since the location of the measurements they make moves with the flow. A major user of drifters is NOAA's Global Drifter Program.

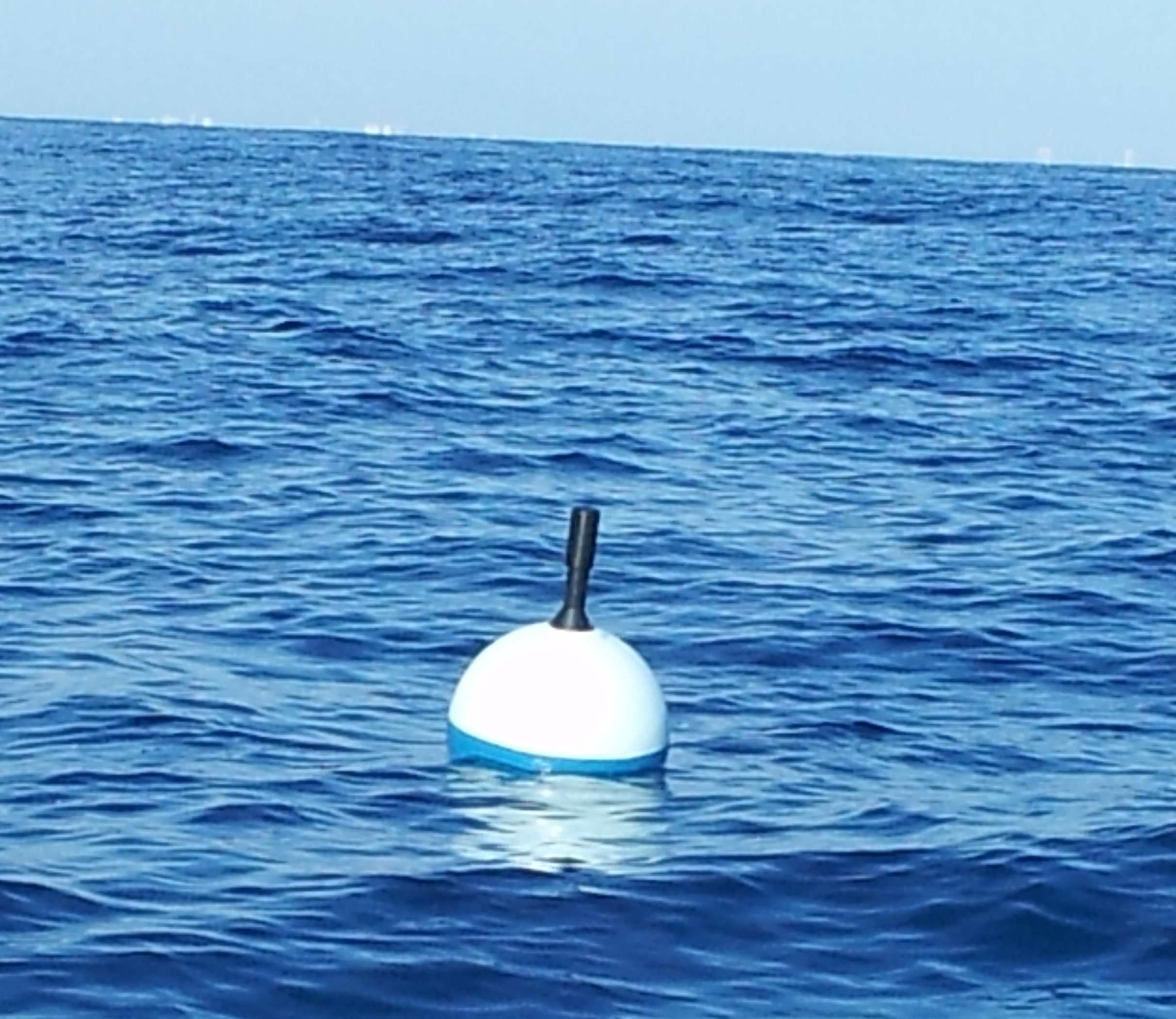
Drifting buoy (DBi)

== Construction principle ==
The major components of a drifter include surface floats for buoyancy, underwater drogues to ensure the drifter follows the movements of the water and is unaffected by wind, instruments (e.g., data collecting instruments, transmitters to transmit the collected data, and GPS devices), and waterproof containers for instruments. Drifters are a technological evolution of ocean current analysis historically performed through drift bottle experiments, which in turn were built on the principle of a message in a bottle.

== Types ==
Drifters are typically either surface drifters, or deepwater drifters. Surface drifters remain in top meter of the water column, and deepwater drifters are suspended approximately 15 meters below the water surface to track sub-surface currents. Both types measure currents in the upper ocean.

=== Surface drifters ===
The main type of surface drifter is the CODE drifter. The CODE drifter gets its name from the 1985 Coastal Dynamics Experiment (CODE), and it is also called a Davis drifter. It is designed to track the wind-driven surface currents in the upper meter of oceanic mixed layer.

The CODE drifter consists of a cylindrical hull that contains the batteries and electronics. The drag element consists of four sails arranged in a cross-like shape. The CODE drifter is slightly negatively buoyant, and small floats connected to the end of the arms to which the sails are attached provide the extra buoyancy to ensure flotation. The sails move the drifter along with the prevailing currents, and the drifter’s transmitter sends data to satellites.

=== Deepwater drifters ===
Deepwater drifters are typically called SVP drifters because they were developed by the Surface Velocity Program (SVP) of the Tropical Ocean Global Atmosphere (TOGA) experiment and the World Ocean Circulation Experiment. They are also called "holey sock" type drifters. They consist of a surface float, a tether, and a drogue. The surface float contains a battery, instruments that collect data like temperature, barometric pressure, wind speed and direction, and ocean salinity, and a transmitter that relays the position of the drifting buoy and data collected by the instruments on the surface float to satellites. The tether connects the surface buoy to the subsurface drogue. And the drogue is a canvas-covered cylindrical frame with holes in it that sits at about 15 meters below the ocean’s surface. Because the drifter sits at this depth, its movement is influenced by processes occurring in the upper 15 meters of the ocean.

== Applications ==
=== Physical oceanography ===
Drifters provide real-time information about ocean circulation. They make more accurate and frequent observations of surface current velocity than is possible from remote sensing measurements. Modern use of solar powered GPS units allows for long term observation of surface currents. Tracking drifters and calculating their speed and direction over several months gives a better understanding of global ocean circulation and how currents may vary between seasons. GPS units can transmit their locational data via satellite for a programed number of times during a day so researchers can see real-time movement, but they may also house other data collection technologies that need to be retrieved and downloaded in-person. Tracking Lagrangian drifters and studying current patterns in particular areas can help understand larval dispersion of marine organisms, track oil spills or other pollutants, navigate shipping lanes, and aid in search and rescue operations.

All drifters measure location which can be used to calculate ocean current velocities. Additional sensors can be added such as sea surface temperature, barometric pressure, salinity, wave height, wind speed and direction, optical sensors, and internal surface float diagnostic sensors. Each measurement requires an additional sensor, while wave height measurements also require the absence of a drogue.

These data can be used to further our knowledge of ocean currents and circulation, improve hurricane intensity forecasts, and improve weather models. They allow scientists to design models of climate and weather patterns, such as El Niño and hurricanes.

==== Physical parameters drifters can measure ====
- Barometric pressure. A barometer on the top of the float is used to measure sea level barometric pressure. These measurements have been shown to significantly improve weather forecasts.
- Sea surface temperature (SST) is measured by a thermistor (thermometer) on the bottom of the float.
- Salinity. A salinity sensor (specifically, a highly accurate pair of conductivity and temperature sensors) is used to measure sea surface salinity at the base of the surface float. This can also be done deeper on the tether between the float and the drogue.
- Wind. A sonic anemometer and a wind vane are used to measure wind speed and wind direction.
- Ocean color. Some drifters have included an upwelling radiance sensor mounted on the surface float just beneath the sea surface, along with a downwelling irradiance sensor. Their observations have been used to study chlorophyll variations in remote regions such as the Southern Ocean.

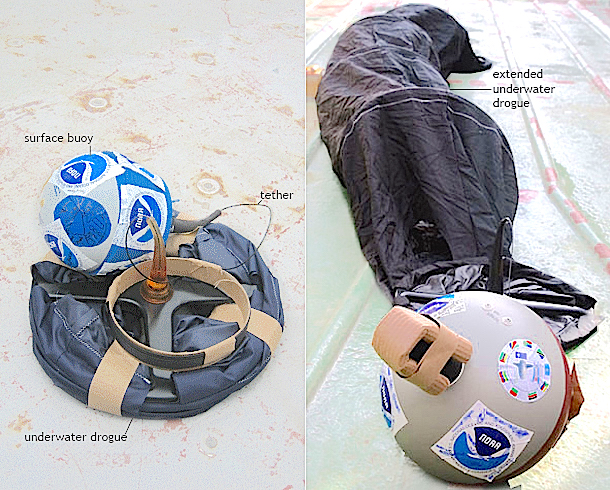
A drifter neatly compressed for deployment (left) and with the nylon drogue fully extended (right).

=== Biological oceanography ===
Drifters are frequently used to collect information on biological oceanography, such as transport of organisms.

Lagrangian drifters may be chosen over more Eulerian-type seagliders for biological research when the advective effects, or influence of mixing water, is to be minimized. See Lagrangian and Eulerian specification of the flow field. Drifters are meant to follow a water parcel as it moves rather than measuring water properties in a specific area. They are generally sent to depth at a specific isopycnal, or line of constant density, before beginning measurements. This depth is usually below the influence of surface winds and mixing. Drifters are used to show the specific water parcel changed over time while gliders which move independently over the water can give larger spatial context.

An example of drifters being used is the North Atlantic Bloom (NAB) experiment looking at physical and biological process in phytoplankton blooms. Dissolved compounds and nutrients, such as O_{2}, NO_{3}, and particulate organic carbon (POC), change within a bloom on various temporal and spatial scales. The drifter measured these compounds, and because drifters are “patch-following”, the influence of water mixing was minimized. Any changes to these oxygen and nutrient levels can be considered ‘internal’ to the water parcel and likely a result of processes such as photosynthesis or respiration that occurred within the parcel itself.

== See also ==
- Ice rafting, another means to investigate ocean circulation
- Swallow float
- Pearn P. Niiler – responsible for many developments in drifter technology and establishment of the Global Drifter Program
- Friendly Floatees
