= Global Drifter Program =

Program measuring ocean currents, temperatures and atmospheric pressure using drifters

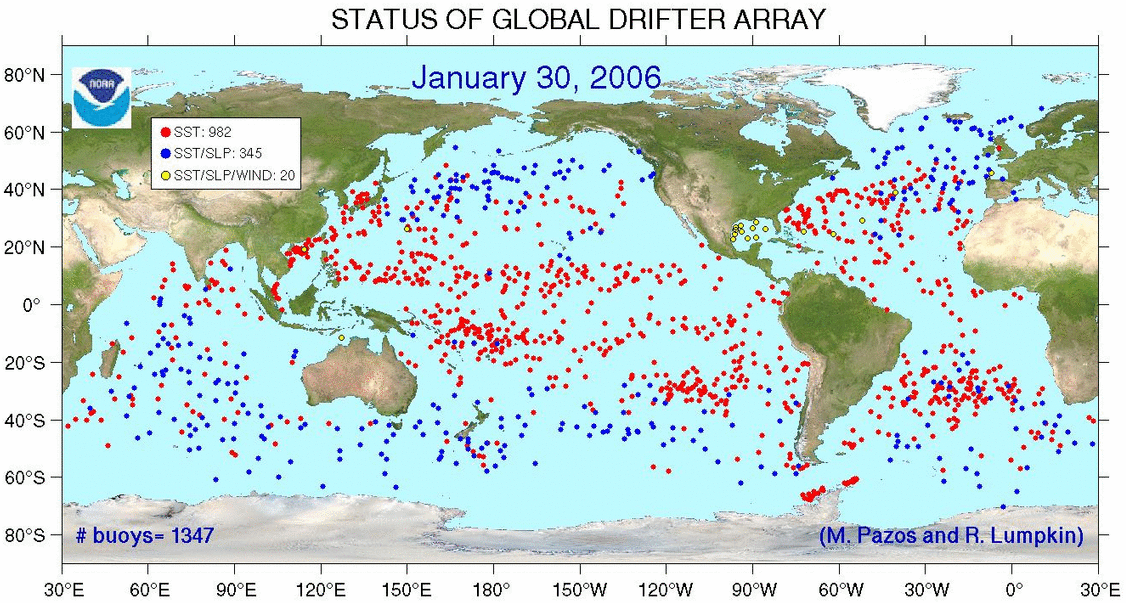
Snapshot of the distribution of the drifters in the GDP. (A live tracking update of drifter locations is available through Google Earth at www.aoml.noaa.gov/phod/dac/gdp_maps.php.)

The Global Drifter Program (GDP) (formerly known as the Surface Velocity Program (SVP)) was conceived by Prof. Peter Niiler, with the objective of collecting measurements of surface ocean currents, sea surface temperature and sea-level atmospheric pressure using drifters. It is the principal component of the Global Surface Drifting Buoy Array, a branch of NOAA's Global Ocean Observations and a scientific project of the Data Buoy Cooperation Panel (DBCP). The project originated in February 1979 as part of the TOGA/Equatorial Pacific Ocean Circulation Experiment (EPOCS) and the first large-scale deployment of drifters was in 1988 with the goal of mapping the tropical Pacific Ocean's surface circulation. The current goal of the project is to use 1250 satellite-tracked surface drifting buoys to make accurate and globally dense in-situ observations of mixed layer currents, sea surface temperature, atmospheric pressure, winds and salinity, and to create a system to process the data. Horizontal transports in the oceanic mixed layer measured by the GDP are relevant to biological and chemical processes as well as physical ones.

== Drifters ==
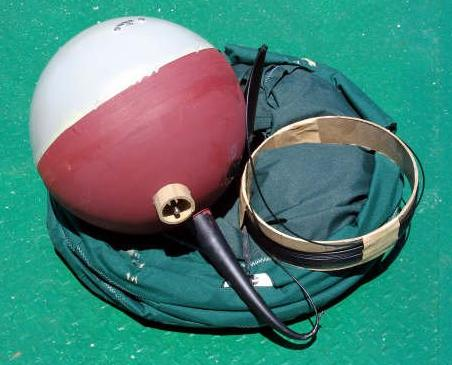
Drifters used in the GDP

SVP project drifter deployments began in 1979; the design continued to develop until reaching its current form in 1992. Each drifter consists of a spherical surface buoy tethered to a weighted nylon drogue that allows it to track the horizontal motion of water at a depth of 15 meters. If the drogue breaks off, the wind pushes the surface buoy through the water, creating erroneous current observations. A tether strain gauge has been added to monitor tension of the buoy-drogue connection to resolve this issue. The original drifters are heavy, bulky (40 cm diameter), and expensive relative to the newer "mini" drifters that are smaller, (30.5 cm diameter) cheaper, and lighter because the hull contains fewer batteries. The surface float contains alkaline batteries, a satellite transmitter, a thermistor for sub-skin sea surface temperature, and sometimes other instruments that measure pressure, wind speed and direction, or salinity.

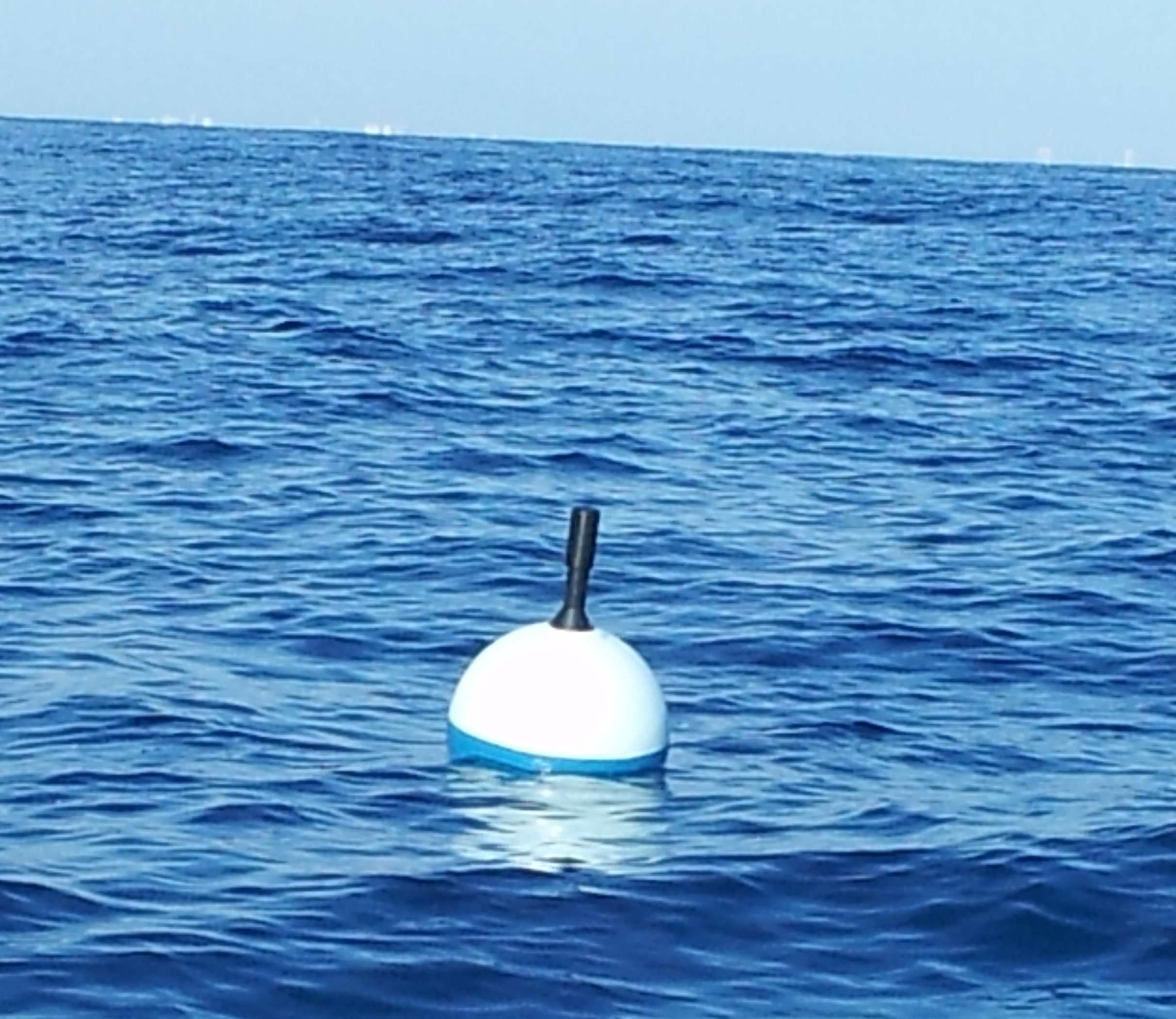
SVP buoy fitted with a barometer (photo by DBi)

The drifters are deployed from research vessels, volunteer ships, and through air deployment. They typically transmit their data hourly and have an average lifetime of ~485 days in 2001. Presently, enough data is gathered to observe currents at a horizontal resolution of one degree (~100 km). Single drifters can be tracked with the name of the drifter.

== Applications ==
The data from the GDP have been used by oceanographers to derive maps of lateral diffusivity and Lagrangian length- and time-scales across the Pacific. Other uses include studies of plastic accumulation the ocean, and climatological models that simulate equatorial ocean currents, as well as many others.

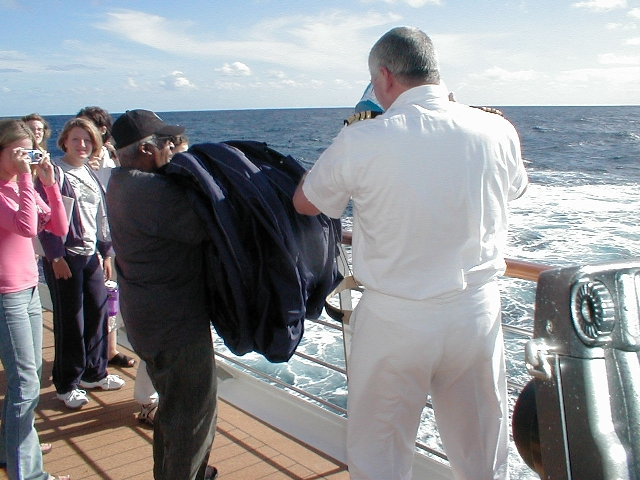
Nobel Laureate Desmond Tutu and Captain Jeremy Kingston deploy a drifter off of the coast of South Africa in the Semester at Sea program, where students from the Congressional School of Virginia and Elsies River High School in South Africa adopted the drifter and will be tracking its passage through the South Atlantic.

== Organization and collaborators ==
The GDP consists of three components. The component at NOAA's Atlantic Oceanographic and Meteorological Laboratory (AOML) manages deployments, processes and archives the data, maintains META files describing each drifter deployed, develops and distributes data-based products, and updates the GDP website. The Lagrangian Drifter Laboratory at the Scripps Institution of Oceanography (SIO) leads the engineering aspects of the Lagrangian drifter technology, improves the existing designs, develops new drifters, manages the real-time data stream, including posting the drifter data to the Global Telecommunication System, supervises the industry, purchases and fabricates most drifters, and develops enhanced data sets. The third component is the manufacturers in private industry, who build drifters according to specifications. The GDP collaborates with partners from numerous countries including Argentina, Australia, Brazil, Canada, France, India, Italy, Republic of Korea, Mexico, New Zealand, South Africa, Spain, United Kingdom, and the United States.
