= North Atlantic Current =

Current of the Atlantic Ocean

The North Atlantic Current is the first leg in the North Atlantic Subpolar Gyre

The North Atlantic Current (NAC), also known as North Atlantic Drift and North Atlantic Sea Movement, is a powerful warm western boundary current within the Atlantic Ocean that extends the Gulf Stream northeastward.

== Characteristics ==
The NAC originates from where the Gulf Stream turns north at the Southeast Newfoundland Rise, a submarine ridge that stretches southeast from the Grand Banks of Newfoundland. The NAC flows northward east of the Grand Banks, from 40°N to 51°N, before turning sharply east to cross the Atlantic. It transports more warm tropical water to northern latitudes than any other boundary current; more than 40 Sv (40 million m^{3}/s; 1.4 billion cu ft/s) in the south and 20 Sv (20 million m^{3}/s; 710 million cu ft/s) as it crosses the Mid-Atlantic Ridge. It reaches speeds of 2 knots (3.7 km/h; 2.3 mph; 1.0 m/s) near the North American coast. Directed by topography, the NAC meanders heavily, but in contrast to the meanders of the Gulf Stream, the NAC meanders remain stable without breaking off into eddies.

The colder parts of the Gulf Stream turn northward near the "tail" of the Grand Banks at 50°W where the Azores Current branches off to flow south of the Azores. From there the NAC flows northeastward, east of the Flemish Cap (47°N, 45°W). Approaching the Mid-Atlantic Ridge, it then turns eastward and becomes much broader and more diffuse. It then splits into a colder northeastern branch and a warmer eastern branch. As the warmer branch turns southward, most of the subtropical component of the Gulf Stream is diverted southward, and as a consequence, the North Atlantic is mostly supplied by subpolar waters, including a contribution from the Labrador Current recirculated into the NAC at 45°N.

West of Continental Europe, it splits into two major branches. One branch goes southeast, becoming the Canary Current as it passes northwest Africa and turns southwest. The other major branch continues north along the coast of Northwestern Europe. Other branches include the Irminger Current and the Norwegian Current. Driven by the global thermohaline circulation, the North Atlantic Current is part of the wind-driven Gulf Stream, which goes further east and north from the North American coast across the Atlantic and into the Arctic Ocean.

The North Atlantic Current, together with the Gulf Stream, have a long-lived reputation for having a considerable warming influence on European climate. However, the principal cause for differences in winter climate between North America and Europe seems to be winds rather than ocean currents (although the currents do exert influence at very high latitudes by preventing the formation of sea ice).

== Climate change ==
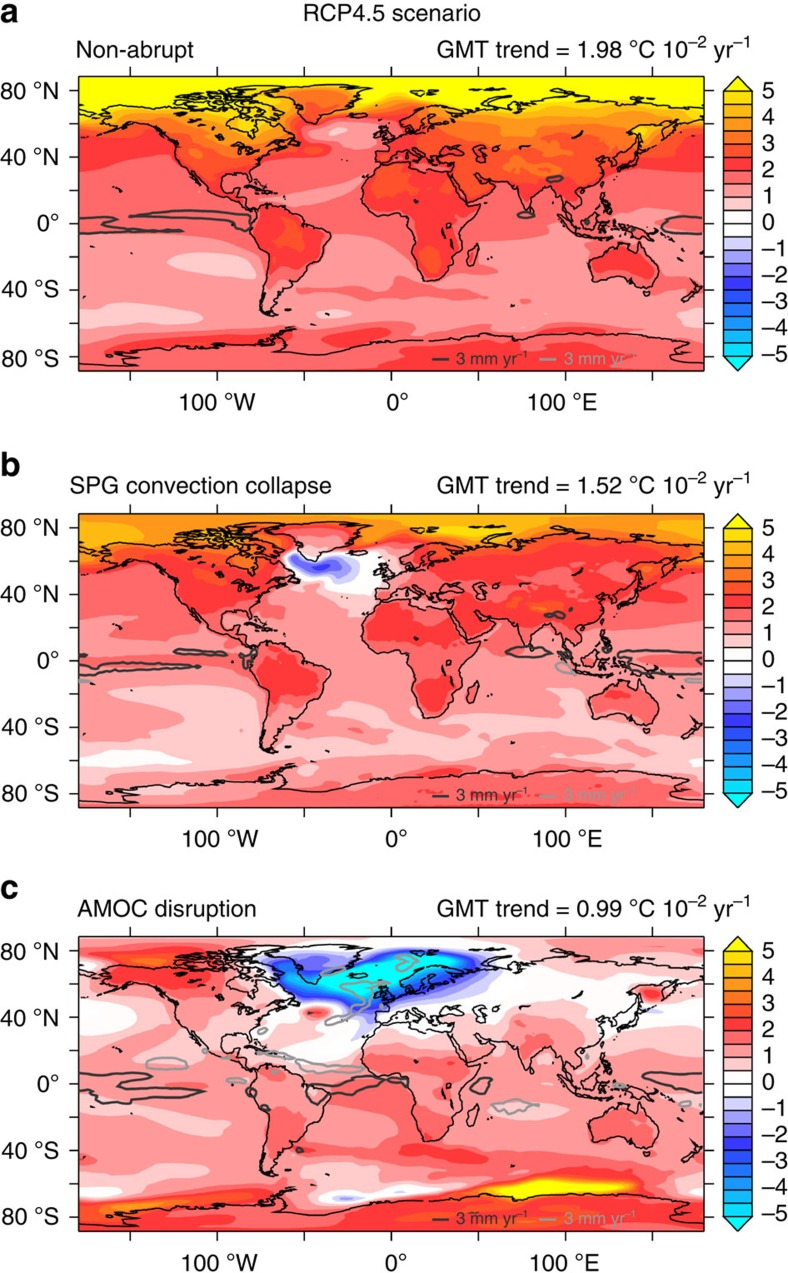
Modelled 21st century warming under the "intermediate" climate change scenario (top). The potential collapse of the subpolar gyre in this scenario (middle). The collapse of the entire AMOC (bottom).

Unlike the AMOC, the observations of Labrador Sea outflow showed no negative trend from 1997 to 2009, and the Labrador Sea convection began to intensify in 2012, reaching a new high in 2016. As of 2022, the trend of strengthened Labrador Sea convection appears to hold, and is associated with observed increases in marine primary production. Yet, a 150-year dataset suggests that even this recently strengthened convection is anomalously weak compared to its baseline state.

Some climate models indicate that the deep convection in Labrador-Irminger Seas could collapse under certain global warming scenarios, which would then collapse the entire circulation in the North subpolar gyre. It is considered unlikely to recover even if the temperature is returned to a lower level, making it an example of a climate tipping point. This would result in rapid cooling, with implications for economic sectors, agriculture industry, water resources and energy management in Western Europe and the East Coast of the United States. Frajka-Williams et al. 2017 pointed out that recent changes in cooling of the subpolar gyre, warm temperatures in the subtropics and cool anomalies over the tropics, increased the spatial distribution of meridional gradient in sea surface temperatures, which is not captured by the AMO Index.

A 2021 study found that this collapse occurs in only four CMIP6 models out of 35 analyzed. However, only 11 models out of 35 can simulate North Atlantic Current with a high degree of accuracy, and this includes all four models which simulate collapse of the subpolar gyre. As the result, the study estimated the risk of an abrupt cooling event over Europe caused by the collapse of the current at 36.4%, which is lower than the 45.5% chance estimated by the previous generation of models. In 2022, a paper suggested that previous disruption of subpolar gyre was connected to the Little Ice Age.

A 2022 Science Magazine review study on climate tipping points noted that in the scenarios where this convection collapses, it is most likely to be triggered by 1.8 degrees of global warming. However, model differences mean that the required warming may be as low as 1.1 degrees or as high as 3.8 degrees. Once triggered, the collapse of the current would most likely take 10 years from start to end, with a range between 5 and 50 years. The loss of this convection is estimated to lower the global temperature by up to 0.5 degrees, while the average temperature in certain regions of the North Atlantic decreases by around 3 degrees. There are also substantial impacts on regional precipitation. A 2023 study warns that the collapse could already happen by mid century.

A 2023 study published in Nature Communications projected that the Atlantic Meridional Overturning Circulation (AMOC), of which the North Atlantic Current is a part, could collapse by mid-century under continued high emissions, posing major risks of abrupt climate changes in Europe and beyond.

== See also ==
- North Atlantic Oscillation
- Ocean gyre
- Physical oceanography
