= Pearn P. Niiler =

American oceanographer (1937–2010)

Pearn Niiler
- Born: September 19, 1937; Tartu, Estonia
- Died: October 15, 2010 (aged 73); San Diego, California
- Education: Lehigh University
- Known for: Global Drifter Program
- Scientific career
- Workplaces: Oregon State University, Scripps Institution of Oceanography

Pearn "Peter" Niiler (1937, Tartu, Estonia, – 15 October 2010, San Diego) was an American oceanographer known for his scientific contributions to ocean circulation and the Global Drifter Program.

== Early life and education ==
In 1948, Niiler, his six siblings and parents arrived in Pittsburgh from a displaced persons camp in Germany where they had lived after fleeing Estonia during World War II. His father, Herbert Niiler, coached the Estonia national basketball team at the 1936 Olympic Games and later ran a YMCA camp near Zelienople, Pennsylvania. Peter Niiler studied engineering at Lehigh University and graduated in 1960. In 1964, he received a doctorate from Brown University where he studied applied mathematics and fluid mechanics.

== Scientific career ==
A Woodrow Wilson scholar and a Fulbright fellow he studied at Cambridge University, UK and was a postdoctoral fellow at Harvard. In 1966, he joined Nova University where he studied the Florida Current and the Gulf Stream. He became professor of oceanography at Oregon State University in 1974. He became professor at the Scripps Institution of Oceanography in 1982, where he worked in the Physical Oceanography Research Division. He was a Scripps Distinguished Professor.

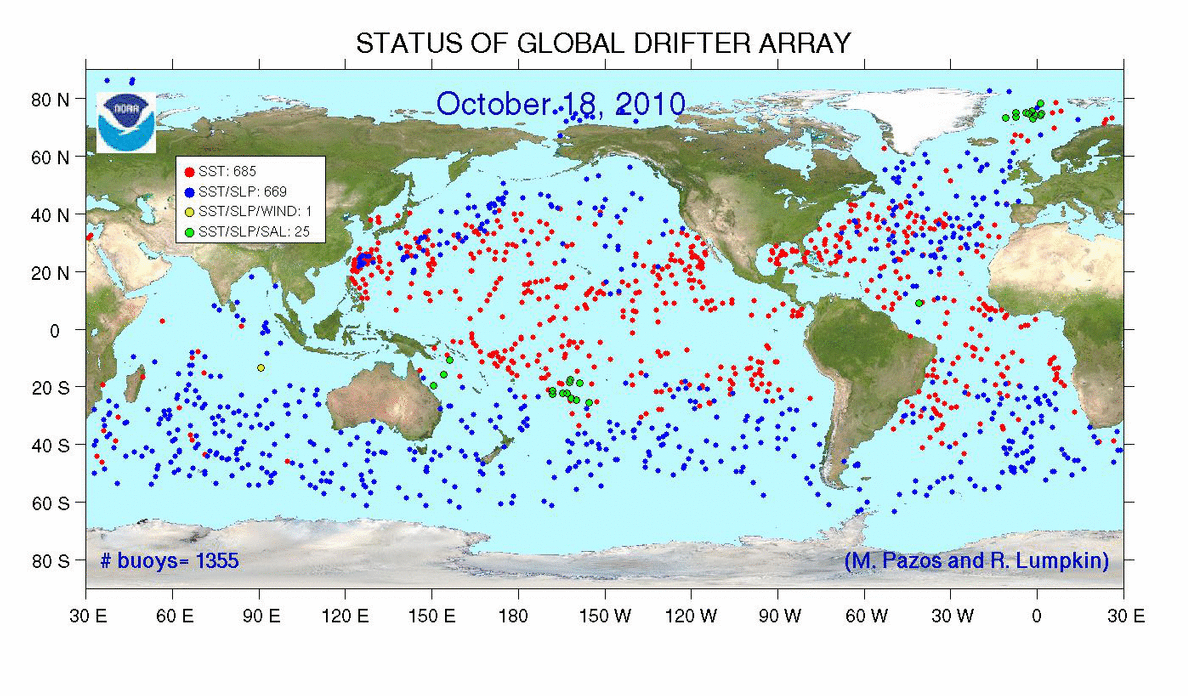
Status of the global drifter array 3 days after Niller's death on October 18, 2010

Niiler designed ocean drifters for measuring direct circulation flow and other instruments for ocean observations. He was the scientific father of the Global Drifter Program and one of the persons responsible for organizing a Boulder, Colorado, meeting in 1982 which initiated the program itself. One of his more clever designs was an ocean drifting measurement device he called the holey sock.

Beginning in 2002, Niiler became involved in tropical hurricane research and his group deployed the first groups of thermistor chain drifters before approaching hurricanes. His final field project was related to tropical hurricanes influence on ocean mixing in the Western Pacific. The project was ongoing when he died, and he coordinated deployment of the thermistor chain drifters of his design during that project. His thermistor chain drifters sampled Typhoon Fanapi in September 2010. Niiler was particularly interested in typhoon cold wake to study relaxation of the mixed layer temperature after cyclone passage.

His interests included measurements of flow and theory of variability of eastern boundary current systems, relationship of heat flux to global sea surface temperature variability, Lagrangian circulation measurements in mixed layers of the world ocean, and response of upper ocean to tropical storms. He was named fellow of the American Geophysical Union in 1986. He was an ongoing distinguished visiting scientist at the Jet Propulsion Laboratory for 31 years beginning in 1979.

== Personal life ==
He was married to Ann Easton in 1960 and had two sons, Eric and Benjamin. They divorced in 1974. His second marriage was to Nancy McCaleb. Their daughter is Ashley. According to Scripps News "He had a passion for architecture and designed numerous homes and several buildings. He played a leading role in creating the distinctive design of the W.M. Keck Foundation Center for Ocean Atmosphere Research, in which his office was housed. He was a painter, a gourmet chef, and an aficionado of wine and travel." He was also supporter of the dance company founded by his wife, Nancy McCaleb.
