= Azores Current =

Ocean current in the North Atlantic Ocean

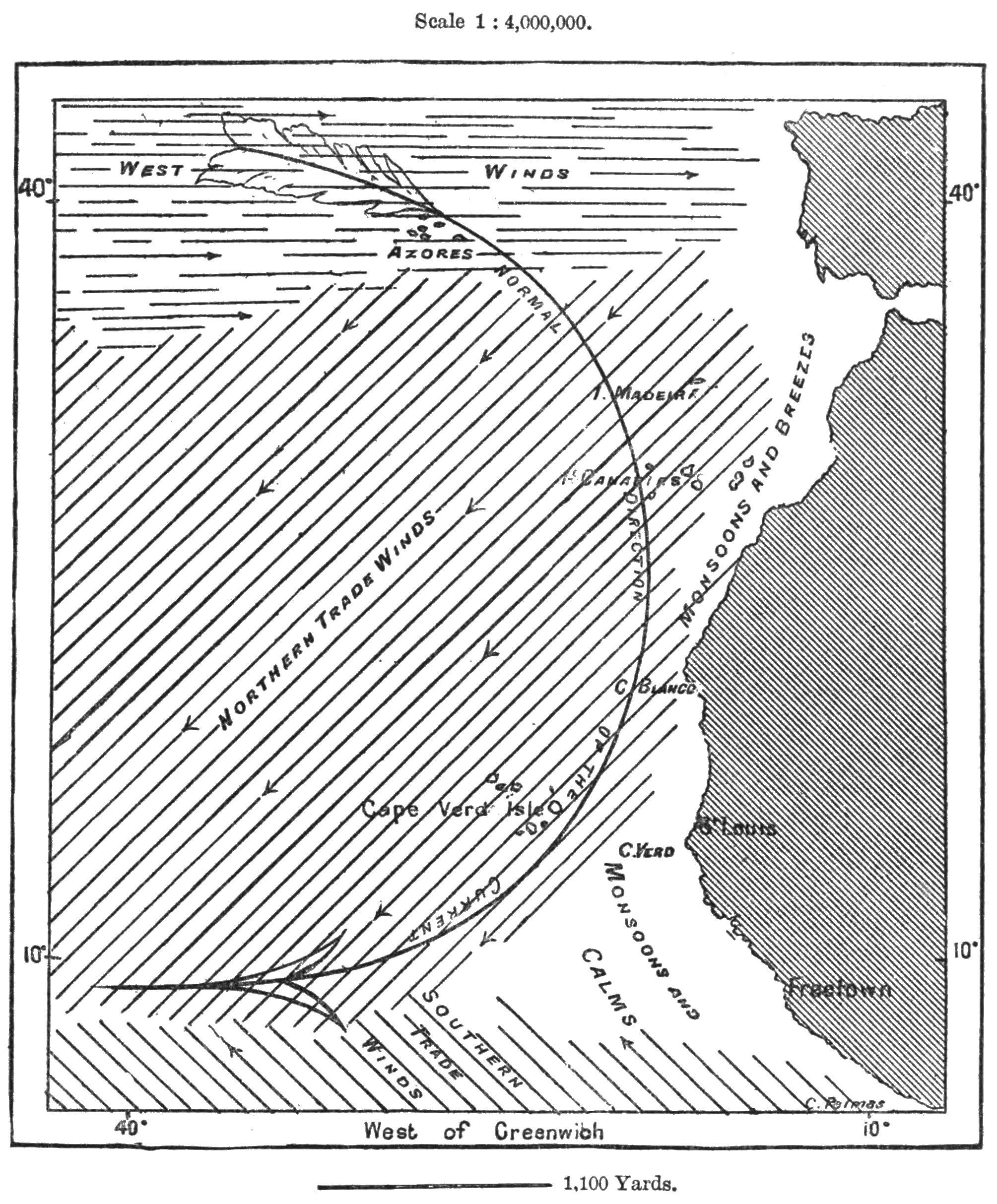
The Azores current represented north of the Azores High, seen around 40°N in the map.

The Azores Current is a generally eastward to southeastward-flowing ocean current in the North Atlantic Ocean. It originates near the Grand Banks of Newfoundland where the Gulf Stream splits into two branches, the northern branch becoming the North Atlantic Current and the south branch the Azores Current.

Recent research suggests that the outflow of salty water from the Mediterranean Sea plays a role in strengthening the Azores Current.
