= Proteolipid =

Protein covalently bonded to lipids

A proteolipid is a protein covalently linked to lipid molecules, which can be fatty acids, isoprenoids or sterols. The process of such a linkage is known as protein lipidation, and falls into the wider category of acylation and post-translational modification. Proteolipids are abundant in brain tissue, and are also present in many other animal and plant tissues. They include ghrelin, a peptide hormone associated with feeding. Many proteolipids have bound fatty acid chains, which often provide an interface for interacting with biological membranes and act as lipidons that direct proteins to specific zones.

Proteolipids were discovered serendipitously in 1951 by Jordi Folch Pi and Marjorie Lees while extracting sulfatides from brain lipids.

They are not to be confused with lipoproteins, a kind of spherical assembly made up of many molecules of lipids and some apolipoproteins.

== Structure ==
Depending on the type of fatty acid attached to the protein, a proteolipid can often contain myristoyl, palmitoyl, or prenyl groups. These groups each serve different functions and have different preferences as to which amino acid residue they attach to. The processes are respectively named myristoylation (usually at N-terminal Gly), palmitoylation (to cysteine), and prenylation (also to cysteine). Despite the seemingly specific names, N-myristoylation and S-palmitoylation can also involve some other fatty acids, most commonly in plants and viral proteolipids. The article on lipid-anchored proteins has more information on these canonical classes.

Lipidated peptides are a type of peptide amphiphile that incorporate one or more alkyl/lipid chains, attached to a peptide head group. As with peptide amphiphiles, they self-assemble depending on the hydrophilic/hydrophobic balance, as well interactions between the peptide units, which is dependent on the charge of the amino acid residues. Lipidated peptides combine the structural features of amphiphilic surfactants with the functions of bioactive peptides, and they are known to assemble into a variety of nanostructures.

== Function and application ==
Due to the desirable properties of peptides such as high receptor affinity and bioactivity, and low toxicity, the use of peptides in therapeutics (i. e. as peptide therapeutics) has great potential; shown by a fast growing market with over 100 approved peptide-based drugs. The disadvantages are that peptides have low oral bioavailability and stability. Lipidation as a chemical modification tool in the development of therapeutic agents has proven to be useful in overcoming these issues, with four lipidized peptide drugs currently approved for use in humans, and various others in clinical trials. Two of the approved drugs are long-acting anti-diabetic GLP-1 analogues liraglutide (Victoza®), and insulin detemir (Levemir®). The other two are the antibiotics daptomycin and polymyxin B.

Lipidated peptides also have applications in other areas, such as use in the cosmetic industry. A commercially available lipidated peptide, Matrixyl, is used in anti-wrinkle creams. Matrixyl is a pentapeptide and has the sequence KTTKS, with an attached palmitoyl lipid chain, that is able to stimulate collagen and fibronectin production in fibroblasts. Several studies have shown promising results of palmitoyl-KTTKS, and topical formulations have been found to significantly reduce fine lines and wrinkles, helping to delay the aging process in the skin. The Hamley group have also carried out investigations of palmitoyl-KTTKS, and found it so self-assemble into nano tapes in the pH range 3–7, in addition to stimulating human dermal and corneal fibroblasts in a concentration dependant manner, suggesting that stimulation occurs above the critical aggregation concentration.

There exist some rarer forms of protein acylation that may not have a membrane-related function. They include serine O-octanoylation in ghrelin, serine O-palmitoleoylation in Wnt proteins, and O-palmitoylation in histone H4 with LPCAT1. Hedgehog proteins are double-modified by (N-)palmitate and cholesterol. Some skin ceramides are proteolipids. The amino group on lysine can also be myristoylation via a poorly-understood mechanism.

== In bacteria ==
All bacteria use proteolipids, sometimes confusingly referred to as bacterial lipoproteins, in their cell membrane. A common modification consists of N-acyl- and S‑diacylglycerol attached to an N-terminal cystine residue. Braun's lipoprotein, found in gram-negative bacteria, is a representative of this group. In addition, Mycobacterium O-mycolate proteins destined for the outer membrane. The plant chloroplast is capable of many of the same modifications that bacteria perform to proteolipids. One database for such N-Acyl Diacyl Glycerylated cell wall proteolipids is DOLOP.

Pathogenic spirochetes, including Borrelia burgdorferi and Treponema pallidum, use their proteolipid adhesins to stick to victim cells. These proteins are also potent antigens, and are in fact the main immunogens of these two species.

Proteolipids include bacterial antibiotics that are not synthesised in the ribosome. Products of nonribosomal peptide synthase may also involve a peptide structure linked to lipids. These are usually referred to as "lipopeptides". Bacterial "lipoproteins" and "lipopeptides" (LP) are potent inducers of sepsis, second only to lipopolysaccharide (LPS) in its ability to cause an inflammation response. While LPS is detected by the toll-like receptor TLR4, LPs are detected by TLR2.

=== Bacillus ===
Many proteolipids are produced by the Bacillus subtilis family, and are composed of a cyclic structure made up of 7–10 amino acids, and a β-hydroxy fatty acid chain of varying length ranging from 13 to 19 carbon atoms. These can be divided into three families depending on the structure of the cyclic peptide sequence: surfactins, iturins, and fengycins. Lipidated peptides produced by Bacillus strains have many useful bio-activities such as anti-bacterial, anti-viral, anti-fungal, and anti-tumour properties, making them very attractive for use in a wide range of industries.

==== Surfactins ====
As the name implies, surfactins are potent biosurfactants (surfactants produced by bacteria, yeast, or fungi), and they have been shown to reduce the surface tension of water from 72 to 27 mN/m at very low concentrations. Furthermore, surfactins are also able to permeabilize lipid membranes, allowing them to have specific antimicrobial and antiviral activities. Since surfactins are biosurfactants, they have diverse functional properties. These include low toxicity, biodegradability and a higher tolerance towards variation of temperature and pH, making them very interesting for use in a wide range of applications.

==== Iturins ====
Iturins are pore‐forming lipopeptides with antifungal activity, and this is dependent on the interaction with the cytoplasmic membrane of the target cells. Mycosubtilin is an iturin isoform that can interact with membranes via its sterol alcohol group, to target ergosterol (a compound found in fungi) to give it antifungal properties.

==== Fengycins ====
Fengycins are another class of biosurfactant produced by Bacillus subtilis, with antifungal activity against filamentous fungi. There are two classes of Fengycins, Fengycin A and Fengycin B, with the two only differing by one amino acid at position 6 in the peptide sequence, with the former having an alanine residue, and the latter having valine.

=== Streptomyces ===
Daptomycin is another naturally occurring lipidated peptide, produced by the Gram positive bacterium Streptomyces roseoporous. The structure of Daptomycin consists of a decanoyl lipid chain attached to a partially cyclised peptide head group. It has very potent antimicrobial properties and is used as an antibiotic to treat life-threatening conditions caused by Gram positive bacteria including MRSA (methicillin-resistant Staphylococcus aureus) and vancomycin resistant Enterococci. As with the Bacillus subtilis lipidated peptides, the permeation of the cell membrane is what gives it its properties, and the mechanism of action with daptomycin is thought to involve the insertion of the decanoyl chain into the bacterial membrane to cause disruption. This then causes a serious depolarization resulting in the inhibition of various synthesis processes including those of DNA, protein and RNA, leading to apoptosis.

== See also ==
- Myelin proteolipid protein
