= C10H20O3 =

The molecular formula C_{10}H_{20}O_{3} may refer to:

- Hydroxydecanoic acids
  - 10-Hydroxydecanoic acid
  - Myrmicacin (3-hydroxydecanoic acid)
- Promoxolane
