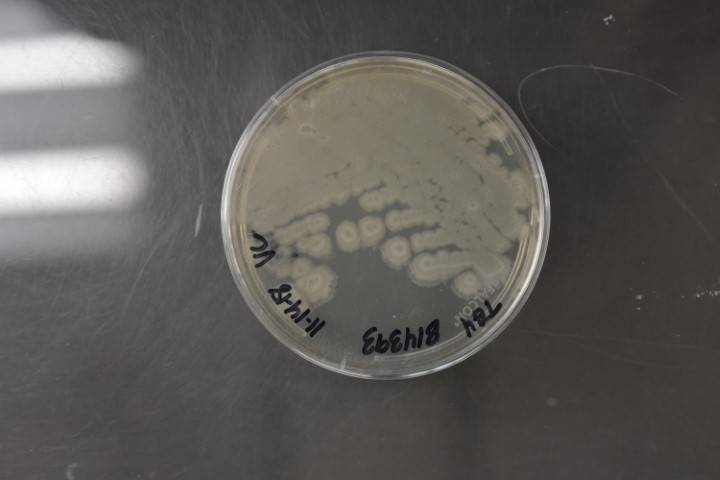

Scientific classification
- Domain: Bacteria
- Kingdom: Bacillati
- Phylum: Bacillota
- Class: Bacilli
- Order: Caryophanales
- Family: Bacillaceae
- Genus: Bacillus
- Species: B. amyloliquefaciens

Binomial name
- Bacillus amyloliquefaciens Priest et al., 1987

= Bacillus amyloliquefaciens =

Species of bacterium

Bacillus amyloliquefaciens is a gram-positive, rod-shaped bacterium species in the genus Bacillus. B. amyloliquefaciens is the source of the BamHI restriction enzyme. The species also synthesizes the enzyme barnase, a widely studied ribonuclease that forms a famously tight complex with an intracellular inhibitor known as barstar, and plantazolicin, an antibiotic with selective activity against Bacillus anthracis.

Cultures of the organism are used in agriculture, aquaculture, and hydroponics to fight pathogens such as Ralstonia solanacearum, Pythium, Rhizoctonia solani, Alternaria tenuissima and Fusarium and to improve root tolerance to salt stress. They are considered a growth-promoting rhizobacteria and have the ability to quickly colonize roots.

Certain strains of Bacillus amyloliquefaciens have been found to be capable of producing a biofilm on plant roots. This enables enhanced nutrient exchange, fostering a stable environment for long-term colonization. Isolates of Bacillus amyloliquefaciens have been found to have a strong biocontrol potential. This allows for plant growth while suppressing disease. In addition, many Bacillus strains, including B. amyloliquefaciens, have been shown to produce many lipopeptide compounds, such as surfactins, iturin, and fengycins, which will change composition depending on the cultural medium and temperature. These compounds have been shown to inhibit certain pathogens such as Ralstonia solanacearum. Beyond direct pathogen inhibition, lipopeptides have also been shown to activate immune responses within a plant. Recent studies have shown that surfactins and fengycins function as key signaling molecules in the induced systemic resistance process. In bean and tomato plants, these two lipopeptides provide defense protection that is often triggered by live Bacillus cells.

== Discovery and name ==
Bacillus amyloliquefaciens was first isolated from the soil 1943 by the Japanese scientist Juichiro Fukumoto, who gave the bacterium its name because it produced (faciens) a liquifying (lique) amylase (amylo).

== Uses ==
Alpha amylase from B. amyloliquefaciens is often used in starch hydrolysis. B. amyloliquefaciens is also a source of subtilisin, which catalyzes the breakdown of proteins in a similar way to trypsin.

=== Agriculture ===
Bacillus amyloliquefaciens is considered a root-colonizing biocontrol bacterium, and is used to fight some plant root pathogens in agriculture, aquaculture, and hydroponics. It has been shown to provide benefits to plants in both soil and hydroponic applications. It takes action against bacterial and fungi pathogens, and may prevent infection though competitive exclusion or out-competing the unwanted pathogen. It has been shown to be effective against several root pathogens that hurt agricultural yields in soil and hydroponics, such as Ralstonia and Pythium in cannabis and tomato crops, Rhizoctonia solani in lettuce, Alternaria tenuissima in English ivy and Fusarium in bananas and cucumbers. It also appears to improve root tolerance against saline stress, allowing plants such as corn to tolerate high salt concentrations in hydroponic applications, while also reducing salt concentrations in the plant tissue.

B. amyloliquefaciens is currently under investigation as a potential probiotic in fish farming. The species has anti nocardial properties.

== Status as a species ==
Between the 1940s and the 1980s, bacteriologists debated as to whether or not B. amyloliquefaciens was a separate species or a subspecies of Bacillus subtilis. The matter was settled in 1987; it was established to be a separate species.

In the American Type Culture Collection, the number for B. amyloliquefaciens is 23350.

Bacillus amyloliquefaciens FZB42, the producer of the ultranarrow-spectrum antibiotic plantazolicin, was reclassified in 2015 as B. velezensis NRRL B-41580T (along with B. methylotrophicus KACC 13015 T and B. oryzicola KACC 18228) based on phenotype and genotype data.
