= Streptomyces parvus =

Scientific classification
- Domain: Bacteria
- Kingdom: Bacillati
- Phylum: Actinomycetota
- Class: Actinomycetes
- Order: Streptomycetales
- Family: Streptomycetaceae
- Genus: Streptomyces
- Species: S. parvus

Binomial name
- Streptomyces parvus Waksman and Henrici 1948

Type strain
- AS 4.0610, ATCC 12433, B-1455, BCRC 15148, BUCSAV 17, BUCSAV 17, CBS 427.61, CCRC 15148, CGMCC 4.0610, DSM 40348, ETH 12647, ETH 14317, HAMBI 1018, HUT-6062, IFO 14599, IFO 3388, IMRU 3686, IMSNU 20267, ISP 5348, JCM 4069, KCC S-0069, KCCS- 0069, KCTC 19057, MTCC 322, NBRC 14599, NBRC 3388, NCIB 9608, NCIMB 9608, NRRL B-1255, NRRL B-1455, NRRL B-B-1455, NRRL-ISP 5348, PSA 14, RGB A-841, RIA 610, VKM Ac-725, Waksman3686

Synonyms
- Actinomyces parvus, Nocardia parva

Species of bacterium

Streptomyces parvus is a bacterium species from the genus of Streptomyces which has been isolated from garden soil. Streptomyces parvus produces the actinomycin C complex, arylomycin A5, arylomycin A6 and actinomycin D.

== See also ==
- List of Streptomyces species
