= Nelfinavir =

Antiretroviral drug

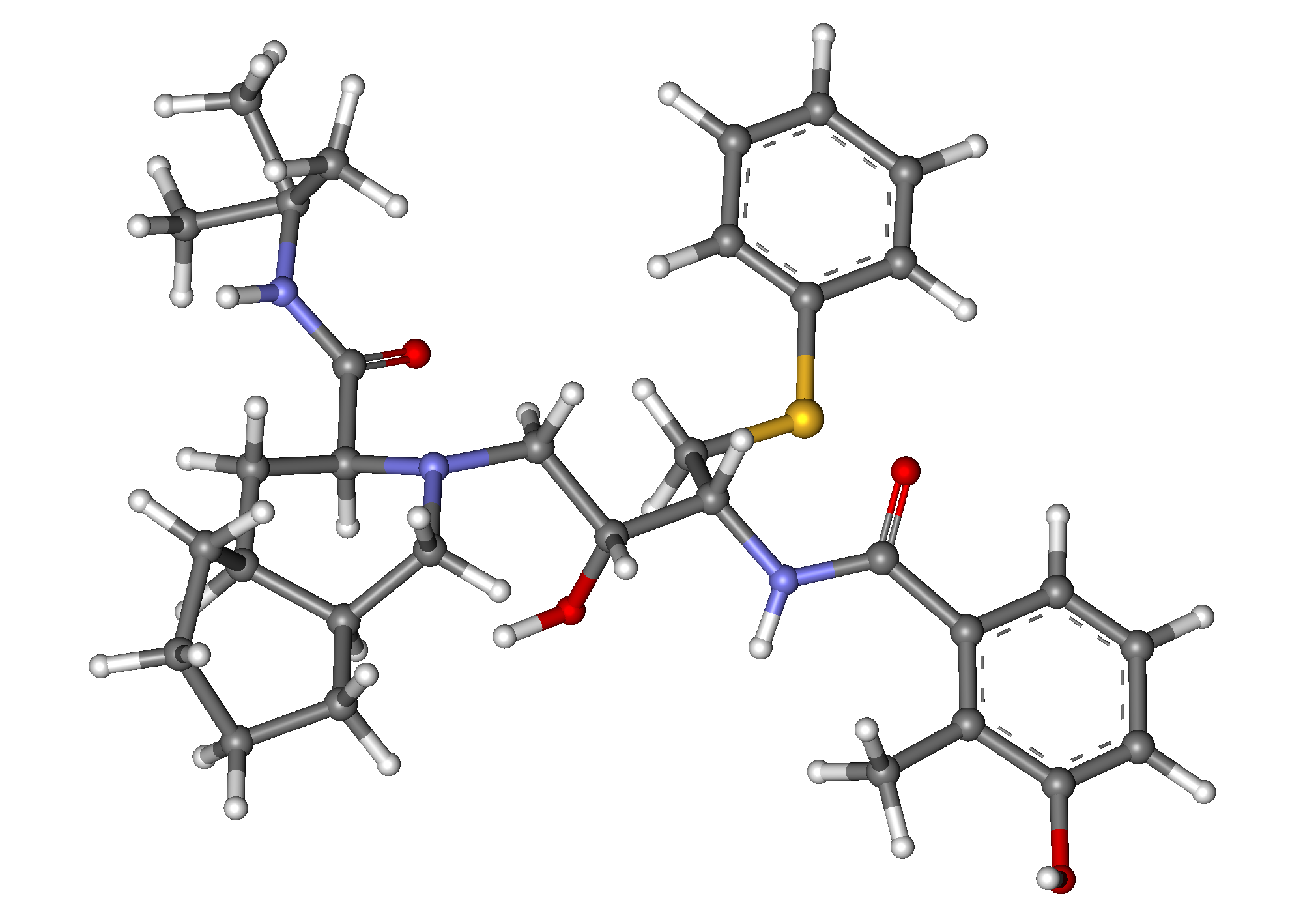

Clinical data
- Trade names: Viracept
- Other names: NFV
- AHFS/Drugs.com: Monograph
- MedlinePlus: a697034
- License data: US DailyMed: Nelfinavir
- Routes of administration: By mouth
- ATC code: J05AE04 (WHO)

Legal status
- Legal status: US: ℞-only

Pharmacokinetic data
- Bioavailability: Uncertain; increases when taking with food
- Protein binding: >98%
- Metabolism: Liver by CYP including CYP3A4 and CYP2C19
- Elimination half-life: 3.5–5 hours
- Excretion: feces (87%), urine (1–2%)

Identifiers
- IUPAC name: (3S,4aS,8aS)-N-tert-butyl-2-[(2R,3R)-2-hydroxy-3-[(3-hydroxy-2-methylphenyl)formamido]-4-(phenylsulfanyl)butyl]-decahydroisoquinoline-3-carboxamide
- CAS Number: 159989-64-7
- PubChem CID: 64143
- DrugBank: DB00220
- ChemSpider: 57718
- UNII: HO3OGH5D7I
- KEGG: D08259
- ChEBI: CHEBI:7496
- ChEMBL: ChEMBL1159655
- NIAID ChemDB: 028590
- CompTox Dashboard (EPA): DTXSID5035080

Chemical and physical data
- Formula: C_{32}H_{45}N_{3}O_{4}S
- Molar mass: 567.79 g·mol^{−1}
- 3D model (JSmol): Interactive image
- Melting point: 349.94 °C (661.89 °F)
- SMILES: O=C(c1cccc(O)c1C)N[C@@H](CSc2ccccc2)[C@H](O)CN4[C@H](C(=O)NC(C)(C)C)C[C@@H]3CCCC[C@@H]3C4
- InChI: InChI=1S/C32H45N3O4S/c1-21-25(15-10-16-28(21)36)30(38)33-26(20-40-24-13-6-5-7-14-24)29(37)19-35-18-23-12-9-8-11-22(23)17-27(35)31(39)34-32(2,3)4/h5-7,10,13-16,22-23,26-27,29,36-37H,8-9,11-12,17-20H2,1-4H3,(H,33,38)(H,34,39)/t22-,23+,26-,27-,29+/m0/s1; Key:QAGYKUNXZHXKMR-HKWSIXNMSA-N

Nelfinavir, sold under the brand name Viracept, is an antiretroviral medication used in the treatment of HIV/AIDS. Nelfinavir belongs to the class of drugs known as protease inhibitors (PIs) and, like other PIs, it is almost always used in combination with other antiretroviral drugs.

Nelfinavir is an orally bioavailable human immunodeficiency virus HIV-1 protease inhibitor (K_{i} = 2 nM) and is widely prescribed in combination with HIV reverse transcriptase inhibitors for the treatment of HIV infection.

It was patented in 1992 and approved for medical use in 1997.

== Toxicity ==
Common (>1%) adverse effects include insulin resistance, hyperglycemia, and lipodystrophy.

Nelfinavir can produce a range of adverse effects. Flatulence, diarrhea, or abdominal pain are common (i.e. experienced by more than one in a hundred patients). Fatigue, urination, rash, mouth ulcers, or hepatitis are less frequent effects (experienced by one in a thousand to one in a hundred patients). Nephrolithiasis, arthralgia, leukopenia, pancreatitis, or allergic reactions may occur, but are rare (less than one in a thousand patients) .

== Other bioactivity ==
=== Antiviral ===
Nelfinavir inhibits the maturation and export of the herpes simplex 1 virus and the Kaposi's sarcoma virus.

=== Anti-virulence activity ===
Nelfinavir and simple derivatives inhibit the production of the virulence factor streptolysin S, a cytolysin produced by the human pathogen Streptococcus pyogenes. Nelfinavir and its derivatives did not exhibit detectable antibiotic activity, but did inhibit the production of other biologically active molecules, including plantazolicin (antibiotic), listeriolysin S (cytolysin), and clostridiolysin S (cytolysin), by other bacteria.

== Interactions ==
Nelfinavir's interaction profile is similar to that of other protease inhibitors. Most interactions occur at the level of the cytochrome P450 isozymes CYP3A4 and CYP2C19, by which nelfinavir is metabolized. For example, nelfinavir reportedly inhibited the metabolism of atorvastatin and simvastatin.

== Pharmacology ==
Nelfinavir should be taken with food. Taking the drug with food reduces the risk of diarrhea as an adverse effect.

== Mechanism of action ==
Nelfinavir is a protease inhibitor: it inhibits HIV-1 and HIV-2 proteases. HIV protease is an aspartate protease, which splits viral protein molecules into smaller fragments and is vital to both replication of the virus within the cell and also to release of mature viral particles from an infected cell. Nelfinavir is a competitive inhibitor (2 nM), which is designed to bind tightly and is not cleaved because of the presence of a hydroxyl group, as opposed to a keto group, in the middle amino acid residue mimic, which would be otherwise S-phenylcysteine. All protease inhibitors bind to the protease, and the precise mode of binding determines how the molecule inhibits the protease. The way in which nelfinavir binds the enzyme may be sufficiently unique to reduce cross-resistance between it and other PIs. Also, not all PIs inhibit both HIV-1 and HIV-2 proteases.

== History ==
Nelfinavir was developed by Agouron Pharmaceuticals as part of a joint venture with Eli Lilly and Company. Agouron Pharmaceuticals was acquired by Warner Lambert in 1999 and is now a subsidiary of Pfizer. Nelfinavir is marketed in Europe by Hoffman-La Roche and elsewhere by ViiV Healthcare.

The US Food and Drug Administration (FDA) approved nelfinavir for therapeutic use in March 1997, making it the twelfth approved antiretroviral. The initial product launched proved to be the largest "biotech launch" in the history of pharmaceutical companies, achieving first full year sales exceeding $US335M. Agouron's patent on the drug expired in 2014.

In June 2007, both the Medicines and Healthcare products Regulatory Agency and the European Medicines Agency put out an alert requesting the recall of any nelfinavir in circulation, because some batches may have been contaminated with potentially cancer-causing chemicals.

== Research ==
Since 2009, nelfinavir has been under investigation for potential use as an anti-cancer agent. When applied to cancer cells in culture (in vitro), it can inhibit the growth of a variety of cancer types and can trigger cell death (apoptosis). When nelfinavir was given to laboratory mice with tumours of the prostate or of the brain, it suppressed tumour growth. At the cellular level, nelfinavir exerts multiple effects to inhibit cancer growth; the two main ones appear to be inhibition of the Akt/PKB signaling pathway and activation of endoplasmic reticulum stress with subsequent unfolded protein response.

In the USA, about three dozen clinical trials are being conducted (or have been completed) in order to determine whether nelfinavir is effective as a cancer therapeutic agent in humans. In some of these trials, nelfinavir has been used alone in monotherapy, whereas in others it has been combined with other modes of cancer therapy, such as well-established chemotherapeutic agents or radiation therapy.

As of April 2022, nelfinavir is being studied as a radiosensitizing agent as part of treatment of advanced cervical cancer.
