= Iturin =

Group of antifungal Bacillus lipopeptides

Iturins are a group of antifungal cyclic lipopeptides produced by Bacillus species, especially members of the Bacillus subtilis species group. They belong to the broader family of iturinic lipopeptides, which also includes the bacillomycins, mycosubtilin and mojavensin. Members of this family consist of a ring of seven α-amino acids (a cyclic heptapeptide) closed by a single β-amino fatty acid whose alkyl chain is typically 14–17 carbons long. This amphiphilic architecture gives iturins a strong affinity for cell membranes, which underlies both their surfactant behavior and their antifungal action. Iturin A is a well-studied member of the group.

Iturins are membrane-active, pore-forming molecules whose activity is directed mainly against yeasts and filamentous fungi rather than bacteria. Together with the surfactin and fengycin families, they are among the principal Bacillus lipopeptides implicated in the biological control of plant diseases, and strains that produce them are used as biocontrol agents against fungal plant pathogens. Purified iturins are studied as biofungicides and biosurfactants.

== Discovery and name ==
Iturin was first reported in 1950 by Lucien Delcambe from a strain of Bacillus subtilis, and described in detail in a 1957 monograph. The name derives from the Ituri region of the northeastern Democratic Republic of the Congo (the Belgian Congo at the time), where the producing strain had been isolated.

== Structure ==
Iturinic lipopeptides are cyclic heptapeptides linked to a β-amino fatty acid. In iturin A the peptide sequence is L-Asn–D-Tyr–D-Asn–L-Gln–L-Pro–D-Asn–L-Ser (chiral pattern LDDLLDL) with an invariant D-tyrosine at position 2; the ring is closed by a β-amino fatty acid whose alkyl chain varies from C_{14} to C_{17}, giving a series of natural homologues. In the preparation used for its original structure determination, iturin A comprised two homologues, C_{48}H_{74}N_{12}O_{14} and C_{49}H_{76}N_{12}O_{14}, with reported nominal masses of 1042 and 1056 Da.

The broader iturinic family shares conserved residues at the first peptide positions but varies at others; besides the iturins it includes bacillomycin D, F and L, mycosubtilin and mojavensin. Iturin A is synthesized non-ribosomally; in B. subtilis RB14 its biosynthetic operon comprises four genes, ituD, ituA, ituB and ituC, characterized in 2001.

== Biological activity and mechanism ==
Iturins show strong, broad-spectrum antifungal activity against many yeasts and filamentous fungi, whereas their antibacterial activity is limited (reported, for example, against Micrococcus luteus). They are membrane-active, pore-forming molecules: the hydrophobic tail drives insertion into the target lipid bilayer, and above a threshold concentration the molecules assemble into ion-conducting pores, causing leakage of potassium and other cell contents and, ultimately, cell death. In Aspergillus niger, iturin A has also been reported to induce the accumulation of reactive oxygen species. Iturins can be hemolytic at higher concentrations, so the balance of activity and toxicity depends on the specific compound and concentration.

== Applications ==
Iturinic lipopeptides are prominent metabolites of many Bacillus strains used as biological control agents against fungal plant diseases. Purified iturins (especially iturin A) are studied as biofungicides and as biosurfactants, and there is research interest in further applications; most such uses of the purified compounds remain investigational.
