= Fengycin =

Antifungal cyclic lipopeptides from Bacillus

Fengycins are a family of antifungal cyclic lipopeptides produced by Bacillus species, especially members of the Bacillus subtilis species group. The related name plipastatin is used in the literature for the same or closely related compounds; in 2012 the representatives plipastatin A1 and fengycin IX were shown to be identical (see below). Fengycins are antifungal agents and biosurfactants that act particularly against filamentous fungi. Each molecule is a lipo-decapeptide: a chain of ten amino acids in which the C-terminus is joined back to a tyrosine side chain to form an internal ring (lactone), with a β-hydroxy fatty acid attached to the N-terminal residue.

Together with the iturin and surfactin families, fengycins are among the principal Bacillus lipopeptides involved in the biological control of plant diseases. They act mainly on fungal cell membranes and can also prime plant defenses, and are studied for crop protection and food-preservation uses.

== Structure ==
Fengycins are lipo-decapeptides (ten amino acids). The peptide bears a β-hydroxy fatty acid attached by an amide bond to the N-terminal glutamate; the reported fatty-acid residues include anteiso-C_{15}, iso-C_{16} and n-C_{16}, with evidence for further saturated and unsaturated chains up to C_{18}. Eight of the ten residues are closed into a ring by an internal lactone bond between the carboxyl group of the C-terminal isoleucine and the phenolic hydroxyl of the L-tyrosine at peptide position 3, leaving a two-residue exocyclic tail. Two classical forms are distinguished by the residue at peptide position 6: fengycin A contains D-alanine and fengycin B contains D-valine; additional fatty-acid homologues also occur. Fengycins are assembled nonribosomally (see below).

== History and relationship to plipastatin ==
Fengycin was first described in 1986 by Vanittanakom and colleagues from strain F-29-3, which was then identified as Bacillus subtilis, as a novel antifungal lipopeptide that inhibited filamentous fungi but was inactive against the yeasts and bacteria tested. Genome-based analysis later reclassified F29-3 as Bacillus halotolerans. The name fengycin derives from Fengyuan District in Taichung, Taiwan, the place of origin of the producing strain. In the same year, Umezawa, Nishikiori and colleagues independently reported plipastatin, from Bacillus cereus BMG302-fF67, as an inhibitor of phospholipase A2.

Earlier publications treated plipastatin A1 and fengycin IX as diastereomers because they assigned opposite L/D configurations to the two tyrosine residues. In 2012 Honma and colleagues showed experimentally that plipastatin A1 and fengycin IX are in fact the same compound, and concluded that the correct structure is the plipastatin one determined by Umezawa's group: L-tyrosine at peptide position 3 and D-tyrosine at position 9 (reported as Tyr4 and Tyr10 respectively when the fatty-acid residue is counted as position 1). The reversed tyrosine assignment that had distinguished plipastatin A1 from fengycin IX was therefore a historical misassignment rather than a genuine structural difference between those two compounds. The terms "fengycin" and "plipastatin" nevertheless continue to be used inconsistently for the same or closely related compounds in later literature.

== Producing organisms and biosynthesis ==
The original fengycin complex was isolated from strain F-29-3, whereas plipastatin was first isolated from B. cereus BMG302-fF67. Biosynthesis is nonribosomal: in B. halotolerans F29-3 (historically reported as B. subtilis F-29-3) the peptide is built by a chain of five fengycin synthetases, FenC, FenD, FenE, FenA and FenB, which interlock in that order so that their activation modules are colinear with the amino-acid sequence of the product.

== Biological activity, mechanism and applications ==
Fengycins are strongly antifungal, particularly against filamentous fungi such as Fusarium, Botrytis, Aspergillus and Colletotrichum. As amphiphilic surfactants they act mainly on cell membranes, altering permeability and structure; additional antifungal effects reported include disruption of cell-wall integrity, interference with intracellular metabolism, and induction of programmed cell death. In plants, fengycins can act as elicitors that trigger induced systemic resistance. These properties make fengycin-producing Bacillus strains and purified fengycins of interest for biological control of crop diseases and for post-harvest and food-preservation research; the original plipastatin was additionally characterized as a phospholipase A2 inhibitor.
