= Baiyu Zhang =

Canadian civil engineer

Baiyu (Helen) Zhang (Chinese: 张白羽) is a Chinese-Canadian civil engineer who studies pollution in coastal marine areas, including wastewater, oil spills, and microplastics, the effects of pollution on the environment, and pollution mitigation measures including the use of biosurfactants. She is a professor and Canada Research Chair in Coastal Environmental Engineering in the Department of Civil Engineering at the Memorial University of Newfoundland, and the founder of the university's Coastal Environmental Research Laboratory.

== Education and career ==
Zhang studied environmental science and engineering at Jilin University in China, earning a bachelor's degree in 1997 and a master's degree in 2000. Originally planning to work as an environmental engineer, she was invited to move to the University of Regina in Canada for doctoral research after a recommendation by a Chinese colleague. She completed her Ph.D. in environmental systems engineering there in 2006. Her dissertation, Development of biosurfactant-enhanced methodologies for bioremediation of petroleum-contaminated sites in western Canada, was supervised by Gordon Huang.

After postdoctoral research at Dalhousie University, supported by a Natural Sciences and Engineering Research Council post-doctoral fellowship, she joined the Memorial University of Newfoundland as an assistant professor in 2010. She was promoted to associate professor in 2015, given a tier 2 Canada Research Chair in Coastal Environmental Engineering in 2015, and promoted to full professor in 2020.

== Recognition ==
Zhang was named as a Fellow of the Canadian Society for Civil Engineering in 2021, and as a Fellow of the Engineering Institute of Canada in 2023. She was named to the Royal Society of Canada's College of New Scholars, Artists and Scientists in 2022.
