= Aculeacin-A deacylase =

Class of enzymes

Identifiers
- EC no.: 3.5.1.70
- CAS no.: 121479-50-3

Databases
- IntEnz: IntEnz view
- BRENDA: BRENDA entry
- ExPASy: NiceZyme view
- KEGG: KEGG entry
- MetaCyc: metabolic pathway
- PRIAM: profile
- PDB structures: RCSB PDB PDBe PDBsum
Search
- PMC: articles
- PubMed: articles
- NCBI: proteins

In enzymology, an aculeacin-A deacylase (EC 3.5.1.70) is an enzyme that catalyzes the chemical reaction that cleaves the amide bond in aculeacin A and related neutral lipopeptide antibiotics, releasing the long-chain fatty acid side chain.

This enzyme belongs to the family of hydrolases, specifically those acting on carbon-nitrogen bonds other than peptide bonds in linear amides. The systematic name of this enzyme class is aculeacin-A amidohydrolase. This enzyme is also called aculeacin A acylase.
