= Neuronatin =

InterPro Family

NNAT

Identifiers
- Aliases: NNAT, Peg5, neuronatin
- External IDs: OMIM: 603106; MGI: 104716; HomoloGene: 36176; GeneCards: NNAT; OMA:NNAT - orthologs

Gene location (Human)
| Chr. | Chromosome 20 (human) |
| Band | 20q11.23 | Start | 37,521,206 bp |
| Band | 20q11.23 | End | 37,523,690 bp |

Gene location (Mouse)
| Chr. | Chromosome 2 (mouse) |
| Band | 2 78.4 cM|2 H1 | Start | 157,401,998 bp |
| Band | 2 78.4 cM|2 H1 | End | 157,404,442 bp |
RNA expression pattern
| Bgee | Human / Mouse (ortholog); Top expressed in: ganglionic eminence; ventricular zone; pituitary gland; anterior pituitary; nucleus accumbens; caudate nucleus; Amygdala; putamen; prefrontal cortex; right frontal lobe / Top expressed in: median eminence; saccule; arcuate nucleus; medial ganglionic eminence; optic nerve; subiculum; mandibular prominence; paraventricular nucleus of hypothalamus; maxillary prominence; dorsomedial hypothalamic nucleus; More reference expression data |
| BioGPS | n/a |
Orthologs
| Species | Human | Mouse |
| Entrez | 4826 | 18111 |
| Ensembl | ENSG00000053438 | ENSMUSG00000067786 |
| UniProt | Q16517 | Q61979 |
| RefSeq (mRNA) | NM_181689; NM_005386; NM_001322802 | NM_001291128; NM_001291129; NM_001291130; NM_010923; NM_180960 |
| RefSeq (protein) | NP_001309731; NP_005377; NP_859017 | NP_001278057; NP_001278058; NP_001278059; NP_035053; NP_851291 |
| Location (UCSC) | Chr 20: 37.52 – 37.52 Mb | Chr 2: 157.4 – 157.4 Mb |
| PubMed search |
- Wikidata
| View/Edit Human | View/Edit Mouse |

Neuronatin is a protein that in humans is encoded by the NNAT gene involved in mammalian brain development. It is located on Chromosome 20 in humans and is only expressed from the paternal allele in normal adults.

== Function ==
The protein neuronatin, a proteolipid, that functions in the control of ion channels during brain development. Neuronatin begins the differentiation of pluripotent stem cells into cells with a neural fate by increasing their calcium levels. Neuronatin expression in neural tissues throughout the brain contributes to development of the nervous system. It is also expressed in several tissues outside of the brain. For example, expression in skin cells controls the differentiation of keratinocytes. Neuronatin expression functions not only in development, but other processes throughout the body.

== Clinical significance ==
It also plays a direct and indirect role in diabetes. Increased expression in pancreatic islet beta cells causes the beta form of the protein to build an aggregate structure. This causes the cells to undergo apoptosis, thus leading to diabetes mellitus. Its effects on glycogen metabolism through the dephosphorylation and activation of the enzyme glycogen synthase may also play an indirect role in contributing to the disease. A different type of malformation in the gene also has the potential to cause a variety of cancers. Contained within the promoter region of the gene are three CpG islands. These imprint regions function in the regulation of gene expression through the process of cytosine methylation. The loss of methylation within these areas triggers an irregular cell growth, resulting in embryonic neoplasms.
