= Streptomyces otsuchiensis =

Scientific classification
- Domain: Bacteria
- Kingdom: Bacillati
- Phylum: Actinomycetota
- Class: Actinomycetia
- Order: Streptomycetales
- Family: Streptomycetaceae
- Genus: Streptomyces
- Species: S. otsuchiensis

Binomial name
- Streptomyces otsuchiensis Terahara et al. 2019

Type strain
- OTB305

Species of bacterium

Streptomyces otsuchiensis is a bacterium species from the genus Streptomyces which has been isolated from marine sediments from the Otsuchi Bay in Japan. Streptomyces otsuchiensis produces biosurfactant.

== See also ==
- List of Streptomyces species
