= PZN =

PZN or pzn may refer to:

- Plantazolicin, a natural antibiotic produced by the gram-positive soil bacterium Bacillus velezensis FZB42
- pzn, the ISO 639-3 code for Para language, Burma
