= Hydroxydecanoic acid =

Hydroxydecanoic acid may refer to:

- 3-Hydroxydecanoic acid (Myrmicacin)
- 10-Hydroxydecanoic acid
