= Queen bee acid =

Chemical compound found in bee royal jelly

Names
- Preferred IUPAC name (2E)-10-Hydroxydec-2-enoic acid
- Other names: 10-Hydroxy-2-decenoic acid; Royal jelly acid

Identifiers
CAS Number	14113-05-4
3D model (JSmol)	Interactive image
ChEBI	CHEBI:78668
ChemSpider	4472163
MeSH	C055543
PubChem CID	5312738
UNII	76B519G7TJ
CompTox Dashboard (EPA)	DTXSID601045504 DTXSID50997870, DTXSID601045504
- InChI: InChI=1S/C10H18O3/c11-9-7-5-3-1-2-4-6-8-10(12)13/h6,8,11H,1-5,7,9H2,(H,12,13)/b8-6+ Key: QHBZHVUGQROELI-SOFGYWHQSA-N; InChI=1/C10H18O3/c11-9-7-5-3-1-2-4-6-8-10(12)13/h6,8,11H,1-5,7,9H2,(H,12,13)/b8-6+ Key: QHBZHVUGQROELI-SOFGYWHQBH
- SMILES: C(CCC/C=C/C(=O)O)CCCO

Properties
Chemical formula	C_{10}H_{18}O_{3}
Molar mass	186.251 g·mol^{−1}
- Except where otherwise noted, data are given for materials in their standard state (at 25 °C [77 °F], 100 kPa). Infobox references

Queen bee acid (10-hydroxy-2-decenoic acid or 10-HDA) is a fatty acid found in royal jelly.

Queen bee acid is being investigated for its potential pharmacological activities. It promotes neurogenesis of neural stem/progenitor cells (cells capable of differentiating into neurons, astrocytes, or oligodendrocytes) in vitro. In addition, queen bee acid has been reported to have in vitro anti-tumor, anti-biotic, immunomodulatory, estrogenic, neurogenic, and innate immune response modulating activities.

In the United States, the Food and Drug Administration has taken legal action against companies that have used unfounded claims of health benefits to market royal jelly products.

== See also ==
- 10-Hydroxydecanoic acid
- 2-Decenedioic acid
