= 10-Hydroxydecanoic acid =

Names
- Preferred IUPAC name 10-Hydroxydecanoic acid
- Other names 10-Hydroxycapric acid

Identifiers
CAS Number	1679-53-4
3D model (JSmol)	Interactive image
ChemSpider	66903
ECHA InfoCard	100.015.317
PubChem CID	74300
UNII	NP03XO416B
CompTox Dashboard (EPA)	DTXSID10168428
- InChI: InChI=1S/C10H20O3/c11-9-7-5-3-1-2-4-6-8-10(12)13/h11H,1-9H2,(H,12,13) Key: YJCJVMMDTBEITC-UHFFFAOYSA-N; InChI=1/C10H20O3/c11-9-7-5-3-1-2-4-6-8-10(12)13/h11H,1-9H2,(H,12,13) Key: YJCJVMMDTBEITC-UHFFFAOYAM
- SMILES: C(CCCCC(=O)O)CCCCO

Properties
Chemical formula	C_{10}H_{20}O_{3}
Molar mass	188.267 g·mol^{−1}
- Except where otherwise noted, data are given for materials in their standard state (at 25 °C [77 °F], 100 kPa). Infobox references

10-Hydroxydecanoic acid is a specialized saturated fatty acid that is a minor constituent of royal jelly. It was discovered in 1957.

The enzyme omega-hydroxydecanoate dehydrogenase is capable of oxidising the hydroxy group to give the corresponding aldehyde:

10-Hydroxydecanoic acid
+ NADP^{+}
H^{+}
H^{+}
10-Oxodecanoic acid
+ NADPH

== See also ==
- Myrmicacin (3-hydroxydecanoic acid)
- Queen bee acid (10-hydroxydecenoic acid)
