= Arylomycin A2 =

Identifiers
CAS Number	459644-20-3
3D model (JSmol)	Interactive image
ChemSpider	4450019
PubChem CID	5287707
CompTox Dashboard (EPA)	DTXSID701336382
- InChI: InChI=1S/C32H40N6O11/c1-15(34-30(46)23(14-39)37(4)17(3)40)28(44)33-13-26(43)38(5)27-19-7-9-25(42)21(12-19)20-10-18(6-8-24(20)41)11-22(32(48)49)36-29(45)16(2)35-31(27)47/h6-10,12,15-16,22-23,27,39,41-42H,11,13-14H2,1-5H3,(H,33,44)(H,34,46)(H,35,47)(H,36,45)(H,48,49)/t15-,16+,22+,23-,27+/m1/s1 Key: TUPFYYWHWXBPLS-YGBZZOJMSA-N
- SMILES: C[C@H]1C(=O)N[C@@H](Cc2ccc(c(c2)-c3cc(ccc3O)[C@@H](C(=O)N1)N(C)C(=O)CNC(=O)[C@@H](C)NC(=O)[C@@H](CO)N(C)C(=O)C)O)C(=O)O

Properties
Chemical formula	C_{32}H_{40}N_{6}O_{11}
Molar mass	684.703 g·mol^{−1}
- Except where otherwise noted, data are given for materials in their standard state (at 25 °C [77 °F], 100 kPa). Infobox references

Arylomycin A2 is a synthetic antibiotic of the arylomycin class.
