= Major royal jelly protein =

Family of proteins secreted by honey bees

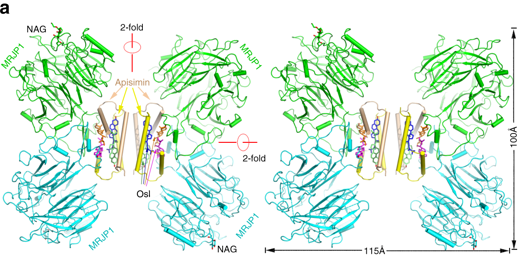
- MRJP1 oligomer showing the H-like complex structure that contains four MRJP1 (green or cyan), four apisimin (yellow or wheat), and eight 24-methylenecholesterol (blue, purple, orange, or lime sticks) molecules

Identifiers
- Organism: Apis mellifera (honey bee)
- Symbol: Mrjp1
- Entrez: 406090
- Orthologs: NCBI: entry; OMA: entry
- RefSeq (mRNA): NM_001011579.1
- RefSeq (Prot): NP_001011579.1
- UniProt: O18330

Other data
- Chromosome: LG11: 2.57 - 2.57 Mb
Search for
- Structures: Swiss-model
- Domains: InterPro

Major royal jelly proteins (MRJPs) are a family of proteins secreted by honey bees. The family consists of nine proteins, of which MRJP1 (also called royalactin), MRJP2, MRJP3, MRJP4, and MRJP5 are present in the royal jelly secreted by worker bees. MRJP1 is the most abundant, and largest in volume. The five proteins constitute 82–90% of the total proteins in royal jelly. Royal jelly is a nutrient-rich mixture of vitamins, sugars, fats, proteins, and enzymes. It is used for feeding larvae. Royal jelly has been used in traditional medicine since ancient times, and the MRJPs are shown to be the main medicinal components. They are synthesised by a family of nine genes (mrjp genes), which are in turn members of the yellow family of genes, such as in the fruitfly (Drosophila) and bacteria. They are involved in the differential development of queen larva and worker larvae, thus establishing division of labour in the bee colony.

== Discovery ==
The chemical investigation on royal jelly started in the 1960s. Jozef Hanes and Jozef Šimuth, of the Slovak Academy of Sciences, were the first to identify major royal jelly protein from the hypopharyngeal glands. In 1992 they isolated the protein as a complex of two molecules.

MRJP1 as a single molecule (monomer) was first isolated by Masaki Kamakura and his team at the Toyama Prefectural University in 2001. He found two proteins as potential markers for freshness of royal jelly protein and named them royal jelly proteins (RJP-1 and RJP-2). RJP-1 was a 57-kDa monomer which is a subunit of a larger complex (oligomer). In 2011, Kamakura claimed that RJP-1 is the main protein for controlling larval development that distinguishes the queen from workers. He gave a new name royalactin. This claim has since been challenged.

In 1994, Hanes and Šimuth's team identified genes called pRJP57–1 and pRJP57–2 from the bee head and found that these genes produce similar proteins to the first MRJP. By 1999, several independent scientists confirmed the existence of five MRJPs. The Honeybee Genome Sequencing Consortium reported in 2006 that there are nine genes for nine MRJPs.

== Structure ==
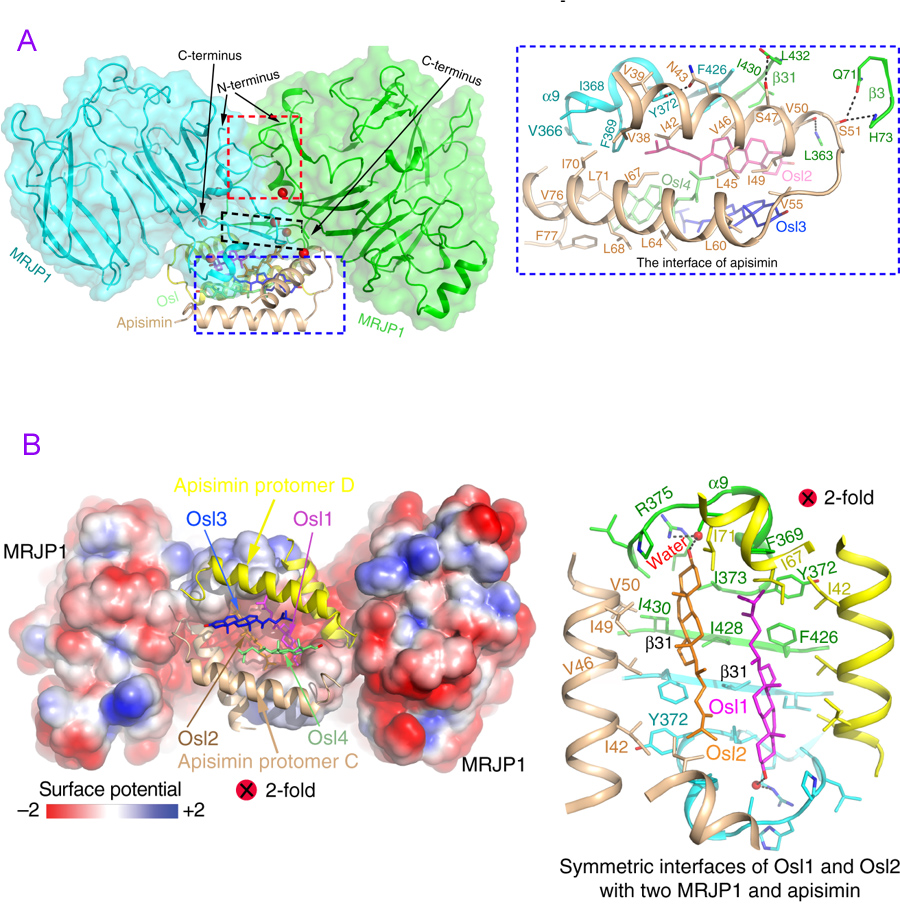
A. Detailed interactions of MRJP1 and apisimin in the MRJP1 dimer; symmetric intermolecular C-terminal and N-terminal interactions and intermolecular C-terminal antiparallel β-sheets β31 (left). B. Interactions of Osl in the MRJP1 oligomer; four Osl (ostreasterol or methylenecholesterol) molecules in the surface potential of MRJP1; interactions of the inner two Osl molecules with MRJP1 and apisimin (left).

MRJP1 is the most abundant protein in royal jelly. It can exist in two forms, as monomer (single structure) and as oligomer (combined structure). The molecular size of the oligomer is 290–350 kDa. The oligomer is a combination of five monomers. The monomers are associated with another protein apimisin. The monomer is 55 kDa in mass, while apimisin is 5 kDa. The monomer contains 432 amino acids, and is divisible (can be cleaved) into three chains, such as jellein-1, jellein-2, and jellein-4. The monomers in the oligomer are held together by apimisin using noncovalent bonds. The oligomer is resistant to high temperature. MRJP2, MRJP3, MRJP4 and MRJP5 are smaller and their sizes range between 49 and 80 kDa.

== Synthesis ==
All MRJPs are synthesised from the hypopharyngeal glands, except for MRJP8. MRJP8 is produced in the head of nurse bees, specifically by the Kenyon cells in the mushroom bodies. It was earlier established that MRJP1 to 5 are produced only by young female workers (nurses); hence the genes mrjp1 to 5 are exclusively active in nurses. But later research showed that mrjp genes are expressed also in forager and the queen, not only in their hypopharynx, but also in their brains and abdomen. mrjp1-7 are expressed in the heads of worker bees, with a higher activity of mrjp1-4 and mrjp7 in nurse bees compared to foragers. In contrast, mrjp5 and mrjp6 are more active in foragers compared. mrjp9 is active in the heads, thoraces and abdomen of all female bees. This indicates that mrjp9 is the oldest gene in the family. The mrjp1 gene covers 3038 bp and contains six exons separated by five introns.

== Function ==
As a major component of the royal jelly, MRJPs are the primary proteins in the diet of bee larvae. Other than their nutritional value, their exact biological function is yet to be confirmed.

=== Controversy ===
In 2011, Masaki Kamakura published a study claiming that MRJP1 controls division of labour (called polyethism). Kamakura professed to have demonstrated that MRJP1 is the main factor for differentiation of the queen larva from worker larvae. In the queen larva, MRJP1 seemed to induce faster growth, juvenile hormone secretion and development of ovary, while reducing the maturation period.

However, this claim was later challenged by a team of researchers at the Martin Luther University of Halle-Wittenberg in 2016 when they attempted to repeat and expand upon Kamakura's initial study. Despite their larger sample size, they could not replicate Kamakura's findings and called into question the validity of the previous study. They found no difference in queen rearing success between larvae fed normal diets and diets in which the MRJP1 was experimentally degraded and inactivated. This 2016 study reported that MRJP1 alone is not the main protein, but MRJP2, MRJP3, and MRJP5 are equally important in the larval development of the queen, consistent with the theory that queen determination is driven by the total amount of food consumed by a larva.

Additionally the team argued that Kamakura's reported 100% success rate when rearing queens was unrealistic and questionable. The Martin Luther University team claimed that it "... is the highest rate ever achieved in over six decades of in vitro queen rearing." The team continued, writing, "Although there is considerable variance in the queen determination rate within and among different laboratories ... it has never, to our knowledge, approached 100%."

== Use ==
MRJPs (as whole royal jelly) are used in the pharmaceutical and cosmetic fields, and are commercialised as an over-the-counter food supplements. They have antimicrobial activities against bacteria, fungi, and viruses. They also show an ability to lower blood pressure, fats in the blood (hypercholesterolemia), stop tumour growth in vitro, and anti-inflammation.

=== Adverse effect ===
Royal jelly has been associated with allergic reactions such as contact dermatitis, acute asthma, and anaphylaxis, which can lead to death. In a clinical diagnosis, MRJP1 and MRJP2 are found to be the main allergens. They induce IgE-mediated hypersensitivity reactions thereby causing type 1 hypersensitivity.
