= Rhamnolipid =

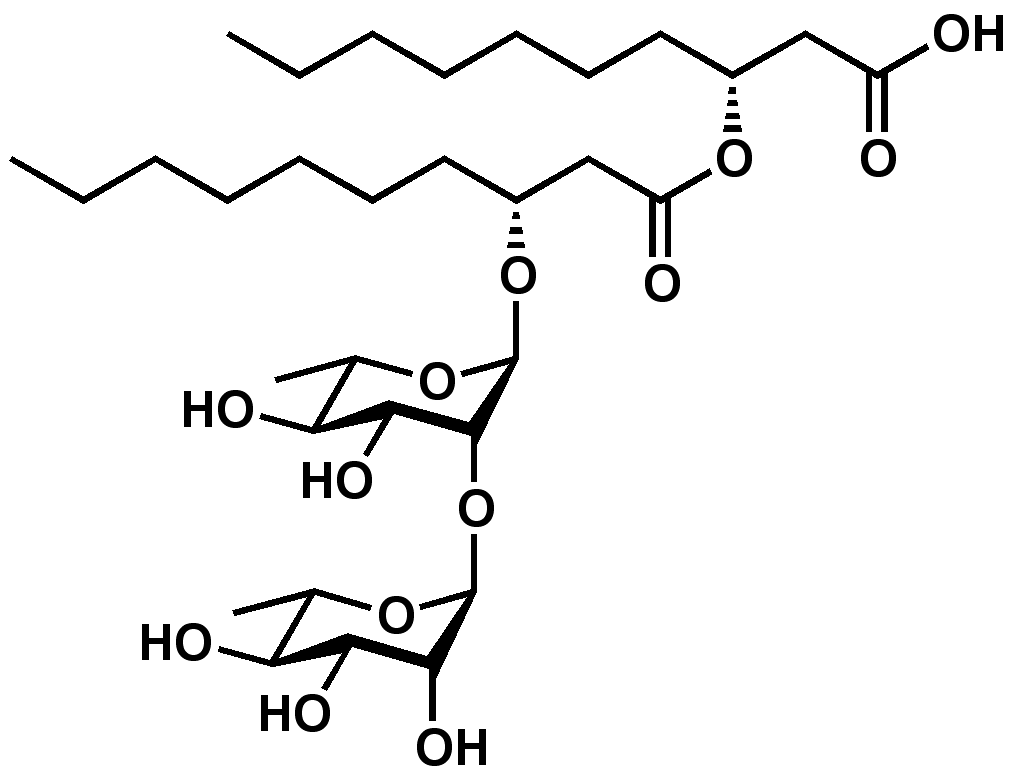
- Rhamnolipid 1, an example of a di-rhamnolipid

Names
- IUPAC name 3-[3-[(2R,3R,4R,5R,6S)-4,5-dihydroxy-6-methyl-3-[(2S,3R,4R,5R,6S)-3,4,5-trihydroxy-6-methyloxan-2-yl]oxyoxan-2-yl]oxydecanoyloxy]decanoic acid
- Other names 3-[(3-{[6-deoxy-2-O-(6-deoxy-alpha-L-mannopyranosyl)-alpha-L-mannopyranosyl]oxy}decanoyl)oxy]decanoic acid

Identifiers
CAS Number	C10,C10: 4348-76-9
3D model (JSmol)	C10,C10: Interactive image
ChEBI	C10,C10: CHEBI:62570
ChemSpider	C10,C10: 4572358
EC Number	C10,C10: 610-124-2
PubChem CID	C10,C10: 5458394
UNII	C10,C10: 4C5TAF9WV3
- InChI: Key: FCBUKWWQSZQDDI-SESCQDRSSA-N; C10,C10: InChI=1S/C32H58O13/c1-5-7-9-11-13-15-21(17-23(33)34)43-24(35)18-22(16- 14-12-10-8-6-2)44-32-30(28(39)26(37)20(4)42-32)45-31-29(40)27(38)25(36) 19(3)41-31/h19-22,25-32,36-40H,5-18H2,1-4H3,(H,33,34)/t19-,20-,21?,22?, 25-,26-,27+,28+,29+,30+,31-,32-/m0/s1
- SMILES: C10,C10: CCCCCCCC(CC(=O)O)OC(=O)CC(CCCCCCC)OC1C(C(C(C(O1)C)O)O)OC2C(C(C(C(O2)C)O)O)O

Properties
Chemical formula	C_{32}H_{58}O_{13}
Molar mass	650.79512
- Except where otherwise noted, data are given for materials in their standard state (at 25 °C [77 °F], 100 kPa). Infobox references

Rhamnolipids are a class of glycolipid produced by Pseudomonas aeruginosa, amongst other organisms, frequently cited as bacterial surfactants. They have a glycosyl head group, in this case a rhamnose moiety, and a 3-(hydroxyalkanoyloxy)alkanoic acid (HAA) fatty acid tail, such as 3-hydroxydecanoic acid.

Specifically there are two main classes of rhamnolipids: mono-rhamnolipids and di-rhamnolipids, which consist of one or two rhamnose groups respectively. Rhamnolipids are also heterogeneous in the length and degree of branching of the HAA moiety, which varies with the growth media used and the environmental conditions.

== Rhamnolipids biosynthesis ==
The first genes discovered in a mutagenesis screen for mutants unable to produce rhamnolipids were rhlA and rhlB. They are arranged in an operon, adjacent to rhlRI, a master regulator of quorum sensing in Pseudomonas aeruginosa. The proteins encoded by rhlA and rhlB; RhlA and RhlB respectively, are expected to form a complex because of the operonic nature of the genes which encode these two proteins and because both proteins are necessary for production of rhamnolipids. Furthermore, it was supposed that the role of RhlA was to stabilise RhlB in the cell membrane and thus the RhlAB complex was labelled as the enzyme Rhamnosyltransferase 1 and is frequently cited as such although there is no biochemical evidence for this and RhlA has been shown to be monomeric in solution. RhlA was subsequently shown to be involved in the production of the precursor to RHLs, HAAs. RhlB adds a rhamnose group to the HAA precursor to form mono-rhamnolipid. Therefore, the products of the rhlAB operon, RhlA and RhlB, catalyse the formation of HAAs and mono-rhamnolipids respectively.

RhlA is an α, β hydrolase (analysis by Fugue structural prediction programme). This fold is a common structural motif in fatty acid synthetic proteins and RhlA shows homology to transacylases. It has been shown using enzyme assays that the substrate for RhlA is hydroxyacyl-ACP rather than hydroxyacyl-CoA suggesting that it catalyses the formation of HAAs directly from the type II fatty acid synthase pathway (FASII). Furthermore, RhlA preferentially interacts with hydroxyacyl-ACP with an acyl chain length of ten carbon residues. The hydroxyacyl-ACP substrate of RhlA is the product of FabG, a protein which encodes the NADPH-dependent β-keto-acyl-ACP reductase required for fatty acid synthesis. It is a member of the FASII cycle along with FabI and FabA, which synthesise the precursors utilised by FabG.

Another gene necessary for synthesis of di-rhamnolipids, rhlC, has also been identified. RhlC catalyses the addition of the second rhamnose moiety to mono-rhamnolipids forming di-rhamnolipids, hence is often labelled rhamnosyltransferase 2. Like rhlA and rhlB, rhlC is thought to be an ancestral gene controlled by the same quorum sensing system as rhlA and rhlB. The rhamnose moiety for mono- and di-rhamnolipids is derived from AlgC activity and the RmlABCD pathway, encoded on the rmlBCAD operon. AlgC produces sugar precursors directly for alginate and lipopolysaccharide (LPS) as well as rhamnolipids. In rhamnose synthesis, AlgC produces glucose-1-phosphate (G1P) which is converted to dTDP-D-glucose by RmlA followed by conversion to dTDP-6-deoxy-D-4-hexulose and then dTDP-6-deoxy-L-lyxo-4-hexulose by RmlB and RmlC respectively. Finally, dTDP-6-deoxy-L-lyxo-4-hexulose is converted to dTDP-L-rhamnose by RmlD. The rhamnose can then be used in the synthesis of rhamnolipids by RhlB and RhlC.

The complete pathway of biosynthesis of rhamnolipids has not been confirmed. In summary, mono- and di- rhamnolipids are produced by sequential rhamnosyltransferase reactions catalysed by RhlB and RhlC respectively. The substrate for RhlB is the fatty acid moiety of the detergent, produced by RhlA.

== The role of rhamnolipids for the producing cell ==
The reason that Pseudomonas aeruginosa produces rhamnolipids is the subject of much speculation. They have been shown to have several properties, and investigations in a rhlA mutant that does not make HAAs nor rhamnolipids have attributed many functions to rhamnolipids which may in fact be due to HAAs. These functions fall broadly into five categories, described below.

=== Uptake of hydrophobic substrates ===
As mentioned previously, Pseudomonas aeruginosa has the ability to metabolise a variety of substrates including n-alkanes, hexadecane and oils. Uptake of these hydrophobic substrates is speculated to rely on the production of rhamnolipids. It is thought that rhamnolipids either cause the Pseudomonas aeruginosa cell surface to become hydrophobic, promoting an interaction between the substrate and the cell, or secreted rhamnolipids emulsify the substrate and allow it to be taken up by the Pseudomonas aeruginosa cell. There is evidence that rhamnolipids are highly adsorbent to the Pseudomonas aeruginosa cell surface, causing it to become hydrophobic. It has also been shown that production of rhamnolipids promotes uptake of hexadecane by overcoming the inhibitory effect of the hydrophilic interactions caused by LPS. Production of rhamnolipids is observed on hydrophobic substrates but equally high yields are achievable on other carbon sources such as sugars. Furthermore, although mono-rhamnolipids have been shown to interact with the Pseudomonas aeruginosa cell membrane and cause it to become hydrophobic, di-rhamnolipids do not interact well with the cell membrane because the polar head group is too large to penetrate the LPS layer. Therefore, although Rhamnolipids may play a part in interaction of Pseudomonas aeruginosa with hydrophobic carbon sources, they are likely to have additional functions.

=== Antimicrobial properties ===
Rhamnolipids have long been reported to have antimicrobial properties. They have been shown to have activity against a range of bacteria including Serratia marcescens, Klebsiella pneumoniae, Staphylococcus aureus and Bacillus subtilis with minimum inhibitory concentrations (MICs) ranging from 0.5 μg/mL to 32 μg/mL. Activity against several fungi such as Fusarium solani and Penicillium funiculosum have also been observed with MICs of 75 μg/mL and 16 μg/mL respectively. Rhamnolipids have been suggested as antimicrobials able to remove Bordetella bronchiseptica biofilms. The mode of killing has been shown to result from intercalation of rhamnolipids into the cell membrane causing pores to form which result in cell lysis, at least in the case of Bacillus subtilis. The anti-microbial action of rhamnolipids may provide a fitness advantage for Pseudomonas aeruginosa by excluding other microorganisms from the colonised niche. Furthermore, rhamnolipids have been shown to have anti-viral and zoosporicidal activities. The antimicrobial properties of rhamnolipids may confer a fitness advantage for Pseudomonas aeruginosa in niche colonisation as Pseudomonas aeruginosa is a soil bacterium, as well as competing with other bacteria in the cystic fibrosis lung.

=== Virulence ===
As mentioned previously, Pseudomonas aeruginosa produces a host of virulence factors in concert, under the control of the quorum sensing system. Many studies show that inhibiting quorum sensing down-regulates the pathogenicity of Pseudomonas aeruginosa. However, it has been shown that rhamnolipids specifically are a key virulence determinant in Pseudomonas aeruginosa. A variety of virulence factors were analysed in Pseudomonas aeruginosa strains isolated from pneumonia patients. Rhamnolipids were found to be the only virulence factor that was associated with the deterioration of the patients to ventilator-associated pneumonia. Several other reports also support the role of rhamnolipids in lung infections. The effect of rhamnolipids in Pseudomonas aeruginosa virulence has been further noted in corneal infections (Alarcon et al., 2009; Zhu et al., 2004). It has been shown that rhamnolipids are able to integrate into the epithelial cell membrane and disrupt tight-junctions. This study used reconstituted epithelial membranes and purified rhamnolipids to demonstrate this mechanism. In addition to inhibition and killing of epithelial cells, rhamnolipids are able to kill polymorphonuclear (PMN) leukocytes and macrophages and inhibit phagocytosis. In summary, rhamnolipids have been shown unequivocally to be a potent virulence factor in the human host, however, they are also produced outside of the host, for example in a soil environment.

Rhamnolipids contribute to the establishment and maintenance of infection in cystic fibrosis patients in a number of ways, they disrupt the bronchial epithelium by disrupting the cell membranes, which promotes paracellular invasion of Pseudomonas aeruginosa and causes ciliostasis, further preventing the clearing of mucus. They also solubilise lung surfactant, allowing phospholipase C access to cell membranes and are necessary for correct biofilm formation.

=== Biofilm mode of growth ===
There are three main phases of biofilm development and rhamnolipids are implicated in each phase. Rhamnolipids are reported to promote motility, thereby inhibiting attachment by preventing cells from adhering tightly to the substratum. During biofilm development, rhamnolipids are reported to create and maintain fluid channels for water and oxygen flow around the base of the biofilm. Furthermore, they are important for forming structure in biofilms; a rhlA mutant forms a flat biofilm. Biofilm dispersal is dependent on Rhammnolipids, however other factors such as degradation of the matrix and activation of motility are also likely to be necessary. It has been shown using fluorescence microscopy that the rhlAB operon is induced in the centre of the mushroom cap, followed by dispersal of cells from the polysaccharide matrix from the centre of these caps causing a cavity to form. A mutation in rhlA causes a failure in formation of mushroom caps at all.

=== Motility ===
Motility is a key virulence determinant in Pseudomonas aeruginosa. Pseudomonas aeruginosa has three distinct methods of moving across or through a medium. Rhamnolipids are particularly important in swarming motility where they are postulated to lower the surface tension of the surface through their surfactant properties, allowing the bacterial cell to swarm. New evidence suggests that rhamnolipids are necessary to allow Pseudomonas aeruginosa cells to overcome attachment mediated by type IV pili. There is some discrepancy between the role of HAAs and RHLs in swarming motility. Some studies use a rhlA mutation to assess the effect on motility, which prevents the formation of HAAs and rhamnolipids. Studies that use a rhlB mutant show that Pseudomonas aeruginosa can swarm in the absence of rhamnolipids, but HAAs are absolutely necessary for swarming. Rhamnolipids have been proposed to be important in regulating swarm tendril formation. Rhamnolipids and HAAs are also implicated in twitching motility, similarly the surfactant is thought to lower the surface tension allowing cells to move across the substratum. However, the role of rhamnolipids in twitching motility may be nutritionally conditional.

== Commercial potential of rhamnolipids ==
Surfactants are in demand for a wide range of industrial applications as they increase solubility, foaming capacity and lower surface tensions. In particular, rhamnolipids have been used broadly in the cosmetic industry for products such as moisturisers, condom lubricant and shampoo. Rhamnolipids are efficacious in bioremediation of organic and heavy metal polluted sites. They also facilitate degradation of waste hydrocarbons such as crude oil and vegetable oil by Pseudomonas aeruginosa. The rhamnolipid surfactant itself is valuable in the cosmetic industry, and rhamnolipids are a source of rhamnose, which is an expensive sugar in itself.

Other bio-based surfactants include sophorolipids and mannose-erythritol lipids.
