= Omega-hydroxydecanoate dehydrogenase =

omega-hydroxydecanoate dehydrogenase

Identifiers
- EC no.: 1.1.1.66
- CAS no.: 9028-65-3

Databases
- IntEnz: IntEnz view
- BRENDA: BRENDA entry
- ExPASy: NiceZyme view
- KEGG: KEGG entry
- MetaCyc: metabolic pathway
- PRIAM: profile
- PDB structures: RCSB PDB PDBe PDBsum
- Gene Ontology: AmiGO / QuickGO
Search
- PMC: articles
- PubMed: articles
- NCBI: proteins

In enzymology, omega-hydroxydecanoate dehydrogenase (EC 1.1.1.66) is an enzyme that catalyzes the chemical reaction

10-Hydroxydecanoic acid
+ NADP^{+}
H^{+}
H^{+}
10-Oxodecanoic acid
+ NADPH

The two substrates of this enzyme are 10-hydroxydecanoic acid and oxidised nicotinamide adenine dinucleotide (NAD^{+}). Its products are 10-oxodecanoic acid, reduced NADH, and a proton.

This enzyme belongs to the family of oxidoreductases, specifically those acting on the CH-OH group of donor with NAD^{+} or NADP^{+} as acceptor. The systematic name of this enzyme class is 10-hydroxydecanoate:NAD^{+} 10-oxidoreductase.
