= Apifresh =

Apifresh, also titled 'Developing European standards for bee pollen and royal jelly: quality, safety and authenticity', was a €2.1 million research project funded by the European Commission 7th Framework Program. It ran from 2010 to 2013, and developed scientific methods and proposed quality standards for bee pollen and royal jelly to support the quality and safety of European bee products.

The project was coordinated by the Tecnologías Avanzadas Inspiralia. Consortium members included: European Professional Beekeepers Association; Orszagos Magyar Meheszeti Egyesulet; Federecao Nacional dos Apicultores de Portugal and Centro Tecnológico Nacional de la Conserva y Alimentación, Campomiel,Balparmak, Parco Tecnologico Padano, Centro Agrícola Regional de Marchamalo, Universidad Complutense de Madrid and TÜBITAK MAM.

== Background ==
At the time Apifresh was launched, the European Union (EU) had harmonised standards for honey but lacked common standards to assess authenticity, composition, or contamination of commercial bee products like bee pollen and royal jelly. There were also concerns about declining bee populations, increase in import of lower-cost bee products, and adulteration of products. Both of these created commercial and consumer protection challenges that justified the development of common scientific standards.

== Objectives ==
The objective of the project was to provide European beekeepers with the scientific and technological aid necessary to improve the quality of European pollen and royal jelly and also to promote the regulatory means that will allow European bee products compete under fair conditions against lower quality or adulterated products.

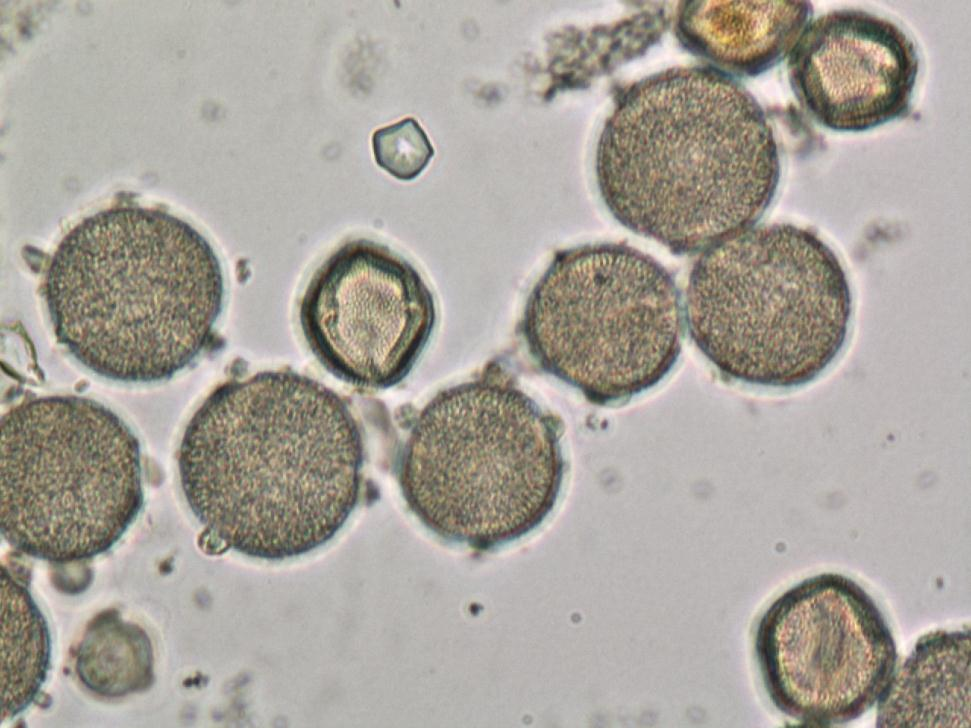
Pollen sample

== Outcomes ==
Apifresh produced:

- proposals for European quality standards for bee pollen and royal jelly;
- manual describing health-enhancing compounds in bee products;
- analytical protocols for testing authenticity;
- best-practice guidelines for harvesting, production and conservation of bee pollen and royal jelly; and
- computer vision methods that automated pollen identification.

Project findings were made publicly available for researchers, beekeeping bodies, and standards organisations, and were not patented.
