= Arylomycin =

Group of chemical compounds

Natural arylomycin A-C_{16} (top) and synthetic analog G0775 (bottom)

The arylomycins are a class of antibiotics initially isolated from a soil sample obtained in Cape Coast, Ghana. In this initial isolation, two families of closely related arylomycins, A and B, were identified. The family of glycosylated arylomycin C lipopeptides were subsequently isolated from a Streptomyces culture in a screen for inhibitors of bacterial signal peptidase. The initially isolated arylomycins have a limited spectrum of activity against Gram-positive bacteria, including Staphylococcus aureus and Streptococcus pneumoniae. The only activity against Gram-negative bacteria was seen in strains with a compromised outer membrane.

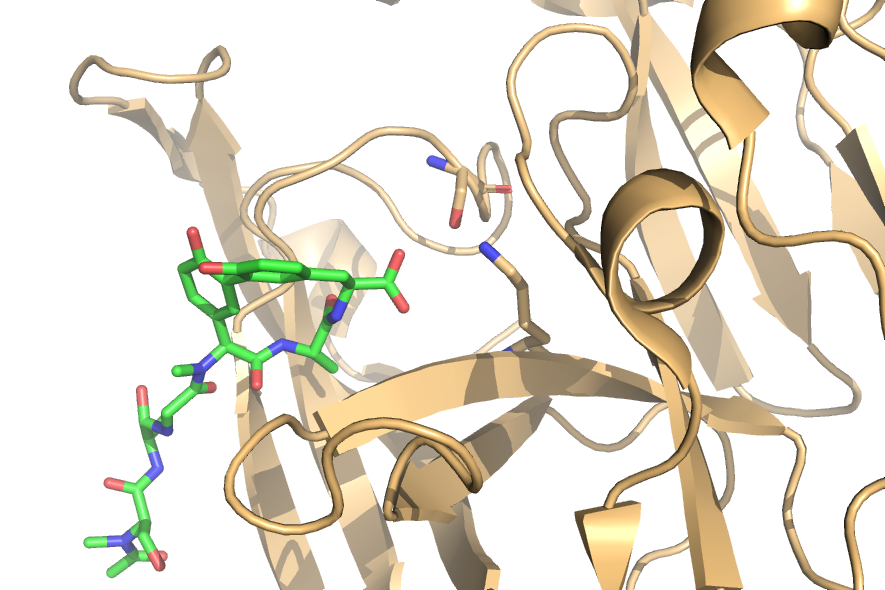
Arylomycin A2 in complex of the E. coli signal peptidase. The catalytic (Ser90 & Lys145) dyad is shown in stick form in proximity to the C terminus of the natural product.

Following their initial identification and characterization, co-crystal structures with the E. coli signal peptidase were determined and showed that the core of the arylomycins binds to the signal peptidase with the alanine residue in the macrocyclic ring taking the place of the P3 alanine residue in the signal peptidase Ala-X-Ala recognition motif. Additionally, the C terminus of the arylomycins is seen to be within hydrogen bonding distance of the serine/lysine catalytic dyad.

Intrigued by the possibility that the arylomycins could represent a class of latent antibiotics whose activity is hidden by mutations in the signal peptidase of bacteria otherwise susceptible to them, researchers in the laboratory of Floyd Romesberg, a chemical biologist at the Scripps Research Institute in San Diego, California, developed a total synthesis of these natural products. The first arylomycin synthesized was arylomycin A2, and this was followed by the preparation of the arylomycins B2 and C.

Their mechanism of action involves inhibition of bacterial type I signal peptidase (SPase). Because there are currently no pharmaceutical drugs with this type of antibiotic activity, arylomycins may have applications in treating drug-resistant bacterial infections and they have therefore attracted research interest.

Synthetic analogs of arylomycins, such as G0775, have been developed which have broader spectrum activity and greater efficacy.

== See also ==
- Arylomycin A2
