= Samuel I. Stupp =

Costa Rican-American Chemist

Samuel Isaac Stupp
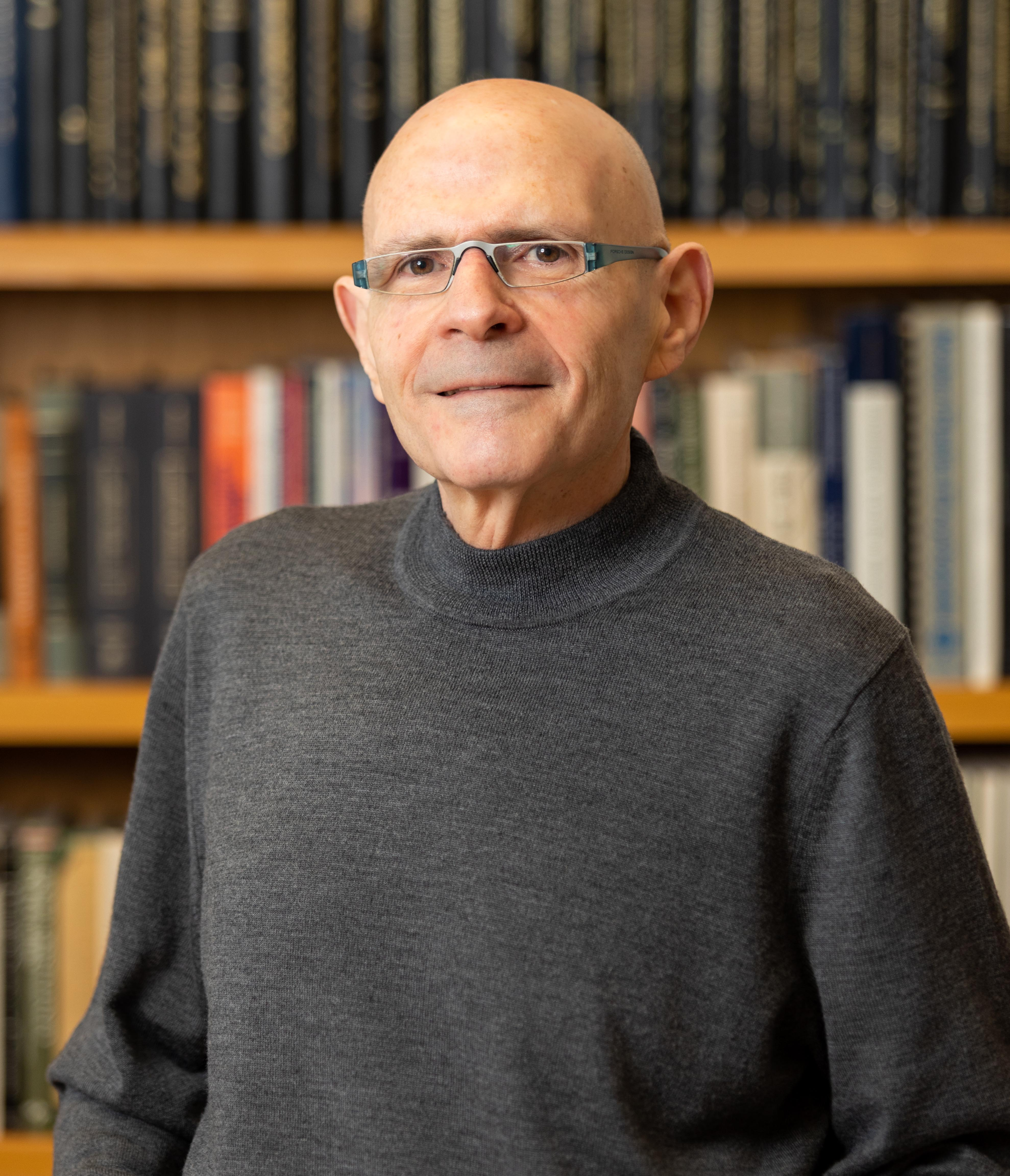
- Samuel I. Stupp
- Born: January 9, 1951 (age 75); San José, Costa Rica
- Education: University of California, Los Angeles; Northwestern University
- Known for: self-assembling materials, peptide amphiphiles, materials for regenerative medicine and solar energy
- Awards: Department of Energy Prize for Outstanding Scientific Accomplishment in Materials Chemistry (1991); Humboldt Award for Senior U.S. Scientists (1997); Elected member of the American Academy of Arts and Sciences (1998); Elected member of the National Academy of Engineering (2012); Elected member of the National Academy of Sciences (2020)
- Scientific career
- Fields: Chemistry, Materials Science, Biomedical Engineering
- Workplaces: Northwestern University
- Doctoral advisor: Stephen Carr
- Website: stupp.northwestern.edu

Samuel Isaac Stupp (born January 9, 1951, in San José, Costa Rica), is a Board of Trustees Professor of Materials Science, Chemistry, and Medicine at Northwestern University in Chicago, IL. He is best known for his work on self-assembling materials and supramolecular chemistry. One of his most notable discoveries is a broad class of peptide amphiphiles that self-assemble into high aspect ratio nanofibers with extensive applications in regenerative medicine. He has also made significant contributions to the fields of supramolecular chemistry, nanotechnology, and organic electronic materials. He has over 500 peer-reviewed publications and was one of the 100 most cited chemists in the 2000–2010 decade.

== Education and academic career ==
=== Early life and education ===
Stupp was born in San José, Costa Rica, the son of Jewish immigrants from Eastern Europe. He attended high school at Liceo de Costa Rica, and in 1968 came to the United States to attend UCLA, where he graduated with a BS in chemistry in 1972. He subsequently went to Northwestern University and earned a PhD under Stephen Carr in 1977, studying the molecular origins of electrical polarization in polymers.

=== Research at UIUC ===
Stupp began his independent research career in 1977 as an assistant professor at Northwestern University, but after three years moved to UIUC where he held appointments in Materials Science and Engineering, Chemistry and Bioengineering. At UIUC his research focused on materials chemistry and self-assembly.

=== Research at Northwestern ===
In 1999, Stupp returned to Northwestern University as a Board of Trustees Professor of Materials Science, Chemistry, and Medicine. In 2000 he was also appointed the Director of the newly formed Institute for BioNanotechnology in Medicine (IBNAM) at Northwestern's medical school campus in downtown Chicago.

One of Stupp's major discoveries occurred soon after his arrival at Northwestern. In 2001, Stupp and postdoctoral fellow Jeffrey Hartgerink discovered a new class of peptide amphiphiles with the ability to self-assemble into nanoscale filaments that mimic components of the extracellular matrix. Consisting of a hydrophobic alkyl tail grafted onto specially designed peptide sequences, these peptide amphiphiles spontaneously form high-aspect ratio nanofibers in water that can present extremely high densities of biological signals on their surface. These molecules have revolutionized the field of bioactive materials for regenerative medicine, with potential applications in bone and cartilage regeneration, angiogenesis for ischemia or peripheral artery disease, cancer therapy, novel therapies for neurodegenerative diseases, stem cell differentiation, spinal cord injury, diabetes, and many other areas.

In addition, Stupp's laboratory is pursuing fundamental research on hierarchical self-assembly, novel materials for solar energy, self-assembling catalytic systems, and robotic soft matter. Stupp is also director of the Center for Bio-Inspired Energy Science.

== Professional achievements ==
Stupp has published over 500 papers in highly respected peer-reviewed scientific journals such as Science, Nature, Journal of the American Chemical Society, and PNAS. He has mentored hundreds of graduate students and postdocs throughout the course of his career.

His awards include the Department of Energy Prize for Outstanding Scientific Accomplishment in Materials Chemistry, the Materials Research Society Medal Award, the International Award from The Society of Polymer Science in Japan, the Royal Society Award in Soft Matter and Biophysical Chemistry, and three national awards from the American Chemical Society: the ACS Award in Polymer Chemistry, the Ronald Breslow Award for Achievement in Biomimetic Chemistry, and the Ralph F. Hirschmann Award in Peptide Chemistry. He is a fellow of several professional societies including the Materials Research Society, the World Biomaterials Congress, the American Association for the Advancement of Science and the American Physical Society. He holds an honorary degree and a distinguished professorship from the Eindhoven University of Technology and an honorary degree from the National University of Costa Rica. He has been a visiting professor at the University of Strasbourg (guest of Jean-Marie Lehn) and held the Juliot Curie Professorship at École Superieure de Physique et de Chimie Industrielles (guest of late Pierre-Gilles de Gennes) and the Merck-Karl Pfister Visiting Professorship in Organic Chemistry at MIT. He has served on numerous scientific advisory boards in the US and Europe and is also a member of multiple scientific journal editorial boards. He was elected to the National Academy of Engineering in 2012 and the National Academy of Sciences in 2020.

In 2001 he chaired the first review of the National Nanotechnology Initiative at the request of the White House Economic Council and the National Academy of Engineering. He gave one of the plenary lectures at the 2012 spring meeting of the American Chemical Society on the subject of “Chemistry for Regenerative Medicine”.

== Personal life ==
Stupp married Dévora Grynspan in 1972. They currently reside in Chicago, IL. His sister, Roxana Stupp, also resides in Chicago and works as the Director of the Disability Resource Center at the University of Illinois at Chicago.
