= Peptide amphiphile =

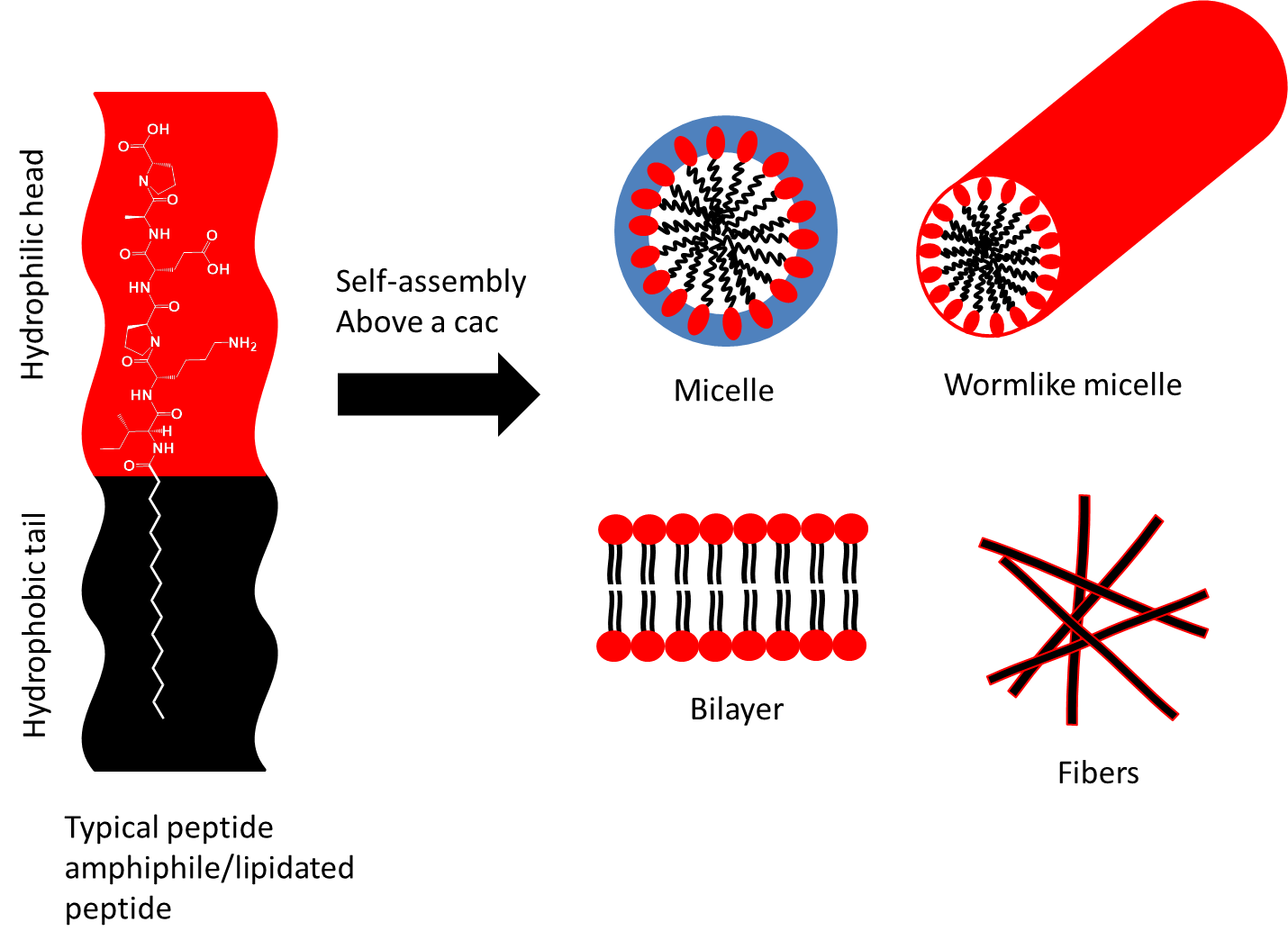
Scheme to show the possible self-assembled structures of typical peptide amphiphiles.

Peptide amphiphiles (PAs) are peptide-based molecules that self-assemble into supramolecular nanostructures including; spherical micelles, twisted ribbons, and high-aspect-ratio nanofibers. A peptide amphiphile typically comprises a hydrophilic peptide sequence attached to a lipid tail, i.e. a hydrophobic alkyl chain with 10 to 16 carbons. Therefore, they can be considered a type of lipopeptide. A special type of PA, is constituted by alternating charged and neutral residues, in a repeated pattern, such as RADA16-I. The PAs were developed in the 1990s and the early 2000s and could be used in various medical areas including: nanocarriers, nanodrugs, and imaging agents. However, perhaps their main potential is in regenerative medicine to culture and deliver cells and growth factors.

== History ==
Peptide amphiphiles were developed in the 1990s. They were first described by the group of Matthew Tirrell in 1995. These first reported PA molecules were composed of two domains: one of lipophilic character and another of hydrophilic properties, which allowed self-assembly into sphere-like supramolecular structures as a result of the association of the lipophilic domains away from the solvent (hydrophobic effect), which resulted in the core of the nanostructure. The hydrophilic residues become exposed to the water, giving rise to a soluble nanostructure.

Work in the laboratory of Samuel I. Stupp by Hartgerink et al., in the early 2000s, reported a new type of PA that are able to self-assemble into elongated nanostructures. These novel PAs contain three regions: a hydrophobic tail, a region of beta-sheet-forming amino acids, and a charged peptide epitope designed to allow solubility of the molecule in water. In addition, the PAs may contain a targeting or signaling epitope that allows the formed nanostructures to perform a biological function, either targeting or signaling, by interacting with living systems. The self-assembly mechanism of these PAs is a combination of hydrogen-bonding between beta-sheet forming amino acids and hydrophobic collapse of the tails to yield the formation of cylindrical micelles that present the peptide epitope at extremely high density at the nanofiber surface. By changing pH or adding counterions to screen the charged surfaces of fibers, gels can be formed. It has been shown that injection of peptide amphiphile solutions in vivo leads to in situ gel formation due to the presence of counterions in physiological solutions. This, along with the complete biodegradability of the materials, suggests numerous applications in in vitro and in vivo therapies.

== Structure ==
Most self-assembling molecules are amphiphilic, meaning they have both hydrophobic and hydrophilic character. Peptide amphiphiles are a class of molecules consisting of either hydrophobic and hydrophilic peptide sequences, or a hydrophilic peptide with an attached hydrophobic group, which is usually an alkyl chain. The structure of a peptide amphiphiles has four key domains. Firstly there is a hydrophobic section, typically an alkyl chain. Secondly there is the peptide sequence which forms intermolecular hydrogen bonding. Thirdly there is a section of charged amino acid residues to enhance the solubility of the peptide in water. The final structural feature allows the peptide to interact with biomolecules, cells, or proteins, and this is often through epitopes (part of antigens recognised by the immune system).

As with other amphiphilic molecules, above a critical aggregation concentration peptide amphiphiles associate through non-covalent interactions to form ordered assemblies of different sizes, from nanometres to microns. Molecules that contain both polar and non-polar elements minimise unfavourable interactions with the aqueous environment via aggregation, which allows the hydrophilic moieties to be exposed to the aqueous environment, and the hydrophobic moieties to be protected. When aggregation occurs, a variety of assemblies can be formed depending on many parameters such as concentration, pH, temperature and geometry. The assemblies formed range from micelles to bilayer structures, such as vesicles, as well as fibrils and gels.

Micelles consist of a hydrophobic inner core surrounded by a hydrophilic outer shell that is exposed to a solvent, and their structures can be spheres, disks or wormlike assemblies. Micelles form spontaneously when the concentration is above a critical micelle concentration and temperature. Amphiphiles with an intermediate level of hydrophobicity prefer to assemble into bilayer vesicles. Vesicles are spherical, hollow, lamellar structures that surround an aqueous core. The hydrophobic moiety faces inwards and forms the inner section of the bilayer, and the hydrophilic moiety is exposed to the aqueous environment on the inner and outer surface. Micelle structures have a hydrophobic interior and hydrophilic exterior.

There is normally a distinct relationship between the amphiphilic character of a peptide and its function in that the amphiphilic character determines the self-assembly properties, and in turn this is what gives the peptide its functionality. The level of amphiphilicity can vary significantly in peptides and proteins; as such they can display regions that are either hydrophobic or hydrophilic in nature. An example of this is the cylindrical structure of an α-helix, as it could contain a section of hydrophobic residues along one face of the cylinder and a hydrophilic section of residues on the opposite face of the cylinder. For β-sheet structures, the peptide chain can be composed of alternating hydrophilic and hydrophobic residues, so that the side chains of the residues are displayed on opposite faces of the sheet. In the cell membrane peptides fold into helices and sheets to allow the non-polar residues to interact with the membrane interior, and to allow the polar residues to be exposed to the aqueous environment. This self-assembly allows the peptides to further optimise their interaction with the surroundings.

Peptide amphiphiles are very useful in biomedical applications, and can be utilised to act as therapeutic agents to treat diseases by transporting drugs across membranes to specific sites. They can then be metabolised into lipids and amino acids, which are then easily removed in the kidneys. This occurs by the hydrophobic tail being able to cross the cell membrane, allowing the peptide epitope to target a specific cell by a ligand- receptor complex. Other applications of peptide amphiphiles are use in antimicrobials, skincare and cosmetics, and also gene delivery to name a few.

== Applications ==
The modular nature of the chemistry allows the tuning of both the mechanical properties and bioactivities of the resulting self-assembled fibers and gels. Bioactive sequences can be used to bind growth factors to localize and present them at high densities to cells, or to directly mimic the function of endogenous biomolecules. Epitopes mimicking the adhesive RGD loop in fibronectin, the IKVAV sequence in laminin and a consensus sequence to bind heparin sulfate are just a few of the large library of sequences that have been synthesized. These molecules and the materials made from them have been shown to be effective in promoting cell adhesion, wound healing, mineralization of bone, differentiation of cells and even recovery of function after spinal cord injury in mice.

In addition to this, peptide amphiphiles can be used to form more sophisticated architectures which can be tuned on demand. In recent years, two discoveries have yielded bioactive materials with more advanced structures and potential applications. In one study, a thermal treatment of peptide amphiphile solutions led to the formation of large birefringent domains in the material that could be aligned by a weak shear force into one continuous monodomain gel of aligned nanofibers. The low shear forces used in aligning the material permit the encapsulation of living cells inside these aligned gels and suggest several applications in regenerating tissues that rely on cell polarity and alignment for function. In another study, the combination of positively charged peptide amphiphiles and negatively charged long biopolymers led to the formation of hierarchically ordered membranes. When the two solutions are brought into contact, electrostatic complexation between the components of each solution creates a diffusion barrier that prevents the mixing of the solutions. Over time, an osmotic pressure difference drives the reptation of polymer chains through the diffusion barrier into the peptide amphiphile compartment, leading to the formation of fibers perpendicular to the interface that grow over time. These materials can be made in the form of flat membranes or as spherical sacs by dropping one solution into the other. These materials are robust enough to handle mechanically and a range of mechanical properties can be accessed by altering growth conditions and time. They can incorporate bioactive peptide amphiphiles, encapsulate cells and biomolecules, and are biocompatible and biodegradable.

== See also ==
- Biomimetic material
- Hydrogel
