= 3,11-Dihydroxydodecanoic acid =

Names
- Preferred IUPAC name 3,11-Dihydroxydodecanoic acid

Identifiers
CAS Number	80828-80-4
3D model (JSmol)	Interactive image
ChEBI	CHEBI:184951
ChemSpider	9710756
PubChem CID	11535975
CompTox Dashboard (EPA)	DTXSID201045526
- InChI: InChI=1S/C12H24O4/c1-10(13)7-5-3-2-4-6-8-11(14)9-12(15)16/h10-11,13-14H,2-9H2,1H3,(H,15,16) Key: VKFCFBZYXIQAIJ-UHFFFAOYSA-N
- SMILES: O=C(O)CC(O)CCCCCCCC(O)C

Properties
Chemical formula	C_{12}H_{24}O_{4}
Molar mass	232.320 g·mol^{−1}
- Except where otherwise noted, data are given for materials in their standard state (at 25 °C [77 °F], 100 kPa). Infobox references

3,11-Dihydroxydodecanoic acid is a chemical found in royal jelly.

== See also ==
- 3,10-Dihydroxydecanoic acid
