= Promoxolane =

Chemical compound

Clinical data
- Routes of administration: By mouth
- ATC code: none

Identifiers
- IUPAC name: 2,2-diisopropyl-4-hydroxymethyl-1,3-dioxolane
- CAS Number: 470-43-9
- PubChem CID: 10105
- ChemSpider: 9701
- UNII: JHI9RRY52E
- ChEBI: CHEBI:134836
- ChEMBL: ChEMBL2104577
- CompTox Dashboard (EPA): DTXSID40861970

Chemical and physical data
- Formula: C_{10}H_{20}O_{3}
- Molar mass: 188.267 g·mol^{−1}
- 3D model (JSmol): Interactive image
- SMILES: CC(C)C1(OCC(O1)CO)C(C)C
- InChI: InChI=1S/C10H20O3/c1-7(2)10(8(3)4)12-6-9(5-11)13-10/h7-9,11H,5-6H2,1-4H3; Key:HHFOOWPWAXNJNY-UHFFFAOYSA-N

Promoxolane (Dimethylane) is a centrally acting muscle relaxant and anxiolytic drug.
