= Biosurfactant =

Surfactant of microbial origin

Biosurfactant usually refers to surfactants of microbial origin. Most of the biosurfactants produced by microbes are synthesized extracellularly and many microbes are known to produce biosurfactants in large relative quantities. Some are of commercial interest. As a secondary metabolite of microorganisms, biosurfactants can be processed by the cultivation of biosurfactant producing microorganisms in the stationary phase on many sorts of low-priced substrates like biochar, plant oils, carbohydrates, wastes, etc. High-level production of biosurfactants can be controlled by regulation of environmental factors and growth circumstances.

== Classification ==
Biosurfactants are usually categorized by their molecular structure. Like synthetic surfactants, they are composed of a hydrophilic moiety made up of amino acids, peptides, (poly)saccharides, or sugar alcohols and a hydrophobic moiety consisting of fatty acids. Correspondingly, the significant classes of biosurfactants include glycolipids, lipopeptides and lipoproteins, and polymeric surfactants as well as particulate surfactants.

== Examples ==
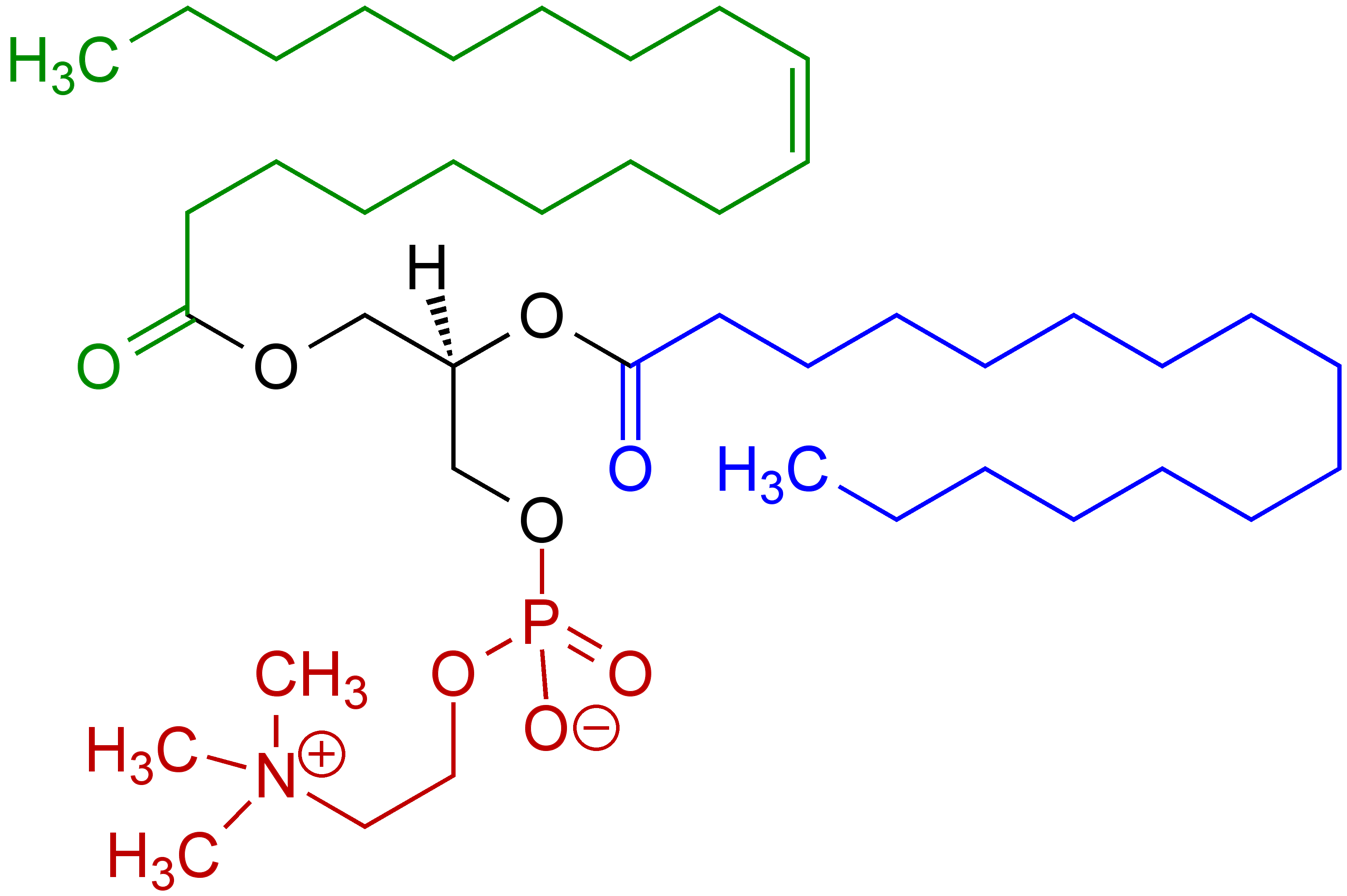
Phosphatidylcholine, also known as lecithin, is a pervasive biological surfactant. Shown in red – choline and phosphate group; black – glycerol; green – monounsaturated fatty acid; blue – saturated fatty acid.

Common biosurfactants include:

- Bile salts are mixtures of micelle-forming compounds that encapsulate food, enabling absorption through the small intestine.
- Lecithin, which can be obtained either from soybean or from egg yolk, is a common food ingredient.
- Rhamnolipids, which can be produced by some species of Pseudomonas, e.g., Pseudomonas aeruginosa.
- Sophorolipids are produced by various nonpathogenic yeasts.
- Emulsan produced by Acinetobacter calcoaceticus.
- Surfactin is a non-ribosomal lipopeptide produced by Bacillus subtilis

Microbial biosurfactants are obtained by including immiscible liquids in the growth medium.

== Applications ==
Potential applications include herbicides and pesticides formulations, detergents, healthcare and cosmetics, pulp and paper, coal, textiles, ceramic processing and food industries, uranium ore-processing, and mechanical dewatering of peat. Such applications are due to the low toxicity, biodegradability, and stability in extreme conditions of biosurfacants.

=== Oil spill remediation ===
Biosurfactants enhance the emulsification of hydrocarbons, thus they have the potential to solubilise hydrocarbon contaminants and increase their availability for microbial degradation. In addition, biosurfactants can modify the cell surface of bacteria that biodegrade hydrocarbons, which can also increase the biodegradability of these pollutants to cells. These compounds can also be used in enhanced oil recovery and may be considered for other potential applications in environmental protection.
