= 3,10-Dihydroxydecanoic acid =

Names
- Preferred IUPAC name 3,10-Dihydroxydecanoic acid

Identifiers
CAS Number	762-05-0
3D model (JSmol)	Interactive image
ChemSpider	8034790
PubChem CID	9859090
UNII	NH45AUS94M
- InChI: InChI=1S/C10H20O4/c11-7-5-3-1-2-4-6-9(12)8-10(13)14/h9,11-12H,1-8H2,(H,13,14) Key: WXCLDXYQUQDNDB-UHFFFAOYSA-N
- SMILES: O=C(O)CC(O)CCCCCCCO

Properties
Chemical formula	C_{10}H_{20}O_{4}
Molar mass	204.266 g·mol^{−1}
- Except where otherwise noted, data are given for materials in their standard state (at 25 °C [77 °F], 100 kPa). Infobox references

3,10-Dihydroxydecanoic acid is a chemical found in royal jelly.

== See also ==
- 3,11-Dihydroxydodecanoic acid
