= Mycosubtilin =

Names
- IUPAC name 3-[(3R,6R,9R,12R,15S,22S,25S,30aS)-6,9,15,22-Tetrakis(2-amino-2-oxoethyl)-3-(4-hydroxybenzyl)-12-(hydroxymethyl)-18-(11-methyltridecyl)-1,4,7,10,13,16,20,23,26-nonaoxotriacontahydropyrrolo[1,2-g][1,4,7,10,13,16,19,22,25]nonaazacyclooctacosin-25-yl]propanamide

Identifiers
CAS Number	1392-60-5
3D model (JSmol)	Interactive image
ChemSpider	2340866
PubChem CID	3083700
- InChI: InChI=1S/C55H86N14O16/c1-3-30(2)13-10-8-6-4-5-7-9-11-14-32-24-47(77)62-36(25-43(57)73)50(80)63-34(20-21-42(56)72)55(85)69-22-12-15-41(69)54(84)67-35(23-31-16-18-33(71)19-17-31)49(79)64-38(27-45(59)75)51(81)65-39(28-46(60)76)52(82)68-40(29-70)53(83)66-37(26-44(58)74)48(78)61-32/h16-19,30,32,34-41,70-71H,3-15,20-29H2,1-2H3,(H2,56,72)(H2,57,73)(H2,58,74)(H2,59,75)(H2,60,76)(H,61,78)(H,62,77)(H,63,80)(H,64,79)(H,65,81)(H,66,83)(H,67,84)(H,68,82)/t30?,32?,34-,35+,36-,37-,38+,39+,40+,41-/m0/s1 Key: RCIPRGNHNAEGHR-ZLHAWHIKSA-N; InChI=1/C55H86N14O16/c1-3-30(2)13-10-8-6-4-5-7-9-11-14-32-24-47(77)62-36(25-43(57)73)50(80)63-34(20-21-42(56)72)55(85)69-22-12-15-41(69)54(84)67-35(23-31-16-18-33(71)19-17-31)49(79)64-38(27-45(59)75)51(81)65-39(28-46(60)76)52(82)68-40(29-70)53(83)66-37(26-44(58)74)48(78)61-32/h16-19,30,32,34-41,70-71H,3-15,20-29H2,1-2H3,(H2,56,72)(H2,57,73)(H2,58,74)(H2,59,75)(H2,60,76)(H,61,78)(H,62,77)(H,63,80)(H,64,79)(H,65,81)(H,66,83)(H,67,84)(H,68,82)/t30?,32?,34-,35+,36-,37-,38+,39+,40+,41-/m0/s1 Key: RCIPRGNHNAEGHR-ZLHAWHIKBU
- SMILES: CCC(C)CCCCCCCCCCC1CC(=O)N[C@H](C(=O)N[C@H](C(=O)N2CCC[C@H]2C(=O)N[C@@H](C(=O)N[C@@H](C(=O)N[C@@H](C(=O)N[C@@H](C(=O)N[C@H](C(=O)N1)CC(=O)N)CO)CC(=O)N)CC(=O)N)Cc3ccc(cc3)O)CCC(=O)N)CC(=O)N

Properties
Chemical formula	C_{55}H_{86}N_{14}O_{16}
Molar mass	1199.375 g·mol^{−1}
- Except where otherwise noted, data are given for materials in their standard state (at 25 °C [77 °F], 100 kPa). Infobox references

Mycosubtilin is a natural lipopeptide with antifungal and hemolytic activities and isolated from Bacillus species. It belongs to the iturin lipopeptide family.

== Definition ==
Mycosubtilin is a natural lipopeptide. It is produced by the strains of Bacillus spp mainly by Bacillus subtilis. It was discovered due to its antifungal activities. It belongs to the family of iturin lipopeptides

== Structure ==
Mycosubtilin is a heptapeptide, cyclized in a ring with a β-amino fatty acid. The peptide sequence is composed of L-Asn-D-Tyr-D-Asn-L-Gln-L-Pro-D-Ser-L-Asn.

== Biological activities ==
Mycosubtilin has strong antifungal and hemolytic activities. It is active against fungi and yeasts such as Candida albicans, Candida tropicalis, Saccharomyces cerevisiae, Penicillium notatum, and Fusarium oxysporum.

Its antibacterial activity is quite limited to bacteria such as Micrococcus luteus.

== See also ==
- Surfactin
