= Bacillomycin =

Bacillomycin D

Names
- IUPAC name 3-[3,9-Bis(2-amino-2-oxo-ethyl)-16-(1-hydroxyethyl)-19-(hydroxymethyl)-6-[(4-hydroxyphenyl)methyl]-13-octyl-2,5,8,11,15,18,21,24-octaoxo-1,4,7,10,14,17,20,23-octazabicyclo[23.3.0]octacosan-22-yl]propanoic acid
- Systematic IUPAC name 3-[16,22-Bis(carbamoylmethyl)-9-(1-hydroxyethyl)-6-(hydroxymethyl)-19-[(4-hydroxyphenyl)methyl]-12-octyl-1,4,7,10,14,17,20,23-octaoxo-hexacosahydro-1H-pyrrolo[1,2-j]1,4,7,10,13,16,19,22-octaazacyclopentacosan-3-yl]propanoic acid
- Other names 3-[16,22-bis(carbamoylmethyl)-9-(1-hydroxyethyl)-6-(hydroxymethyl)-19-[(4-hydroxyphenyl)methyl]-12-octyl-1,4,7,10,14,17,20,23-octaoxo-octadecahydro-2H-pyrrolo[1,2-j]1,4,7,10,13,16,19,22-octaazacyclopentacosan-3-yl]propanoic acid

Identifiers
CAS Number	1395-21-7
3D model (JSmol)	Interactive image
ChemSpider	2342763
PubChem CID	3086051
- InChI: InChI=1S/C45H68N10O15/c1-3-4-5-6-7-8-10-26-20-36(61)49-30(21-34(46)59)41(66)51-29(19-25-12-14-27(58)15-13-25)40(65)52-31(22-35(47)60)45(70)55-18-9-11-33(55)43(68)50-28(16-17-37(62)63)39(64)53-32(23-56)42(67)54-38(24(2)57)44(69)48-26/h12-15,24,26,28-33,38,56-58H,3-11,16-23H2,1-2H3,(H2,46,59)(H2,47,60)(H,48,69)(H,49,61)(H,50,68)(H,51,66)(H,52,65)(H,53,64)(H,54,67)(H,62,63) Key: VLKSXJAPRDAENT-UHFFFAOYSA-N
- SMILES: CCCCCCCCC1CC(=O)NC(CC(N)=O)C(=O)NC(CC2=CC=C(O)C=C2)C(=O)NC(CC(N)=O)C(=O)N2CCCC2C(=O)NC(CCC(O)=O)C(=O)NC(CO)C(=O)NC(C(C)O)C(=O)N1

Properties
Chemical formula	C_{45}H_{68}N_{10}O_{15}
Molar mass	989.094 g·mol^{−1}
- Except where otherwise noted, data are given for materials in their standard state (at 25 °C [77 °F], 100 kPa). verify (what is ?) Infobox references

Bacillomycins are a group of antifungal polypeptide antibiotics isolated from Bacillus subtilis.

Examples include:

- Bacillomycin A (fungosin, structure unknown)
- Bacillomycin C (structure unknown)
- Bacillomycin D (C_{45}H_{68}N_{10}O_{15})
- Bacillomycin F (C_{52}H_{84}N_{12}O_{14})
- Bacillomycin Fc (C_{52}H_{84}N_{12}O_{14})
- Bacillomycin L (Landy substance)
- Bacillomycin S (structure unknown)
