= Plantazolicin =

Chemical compound

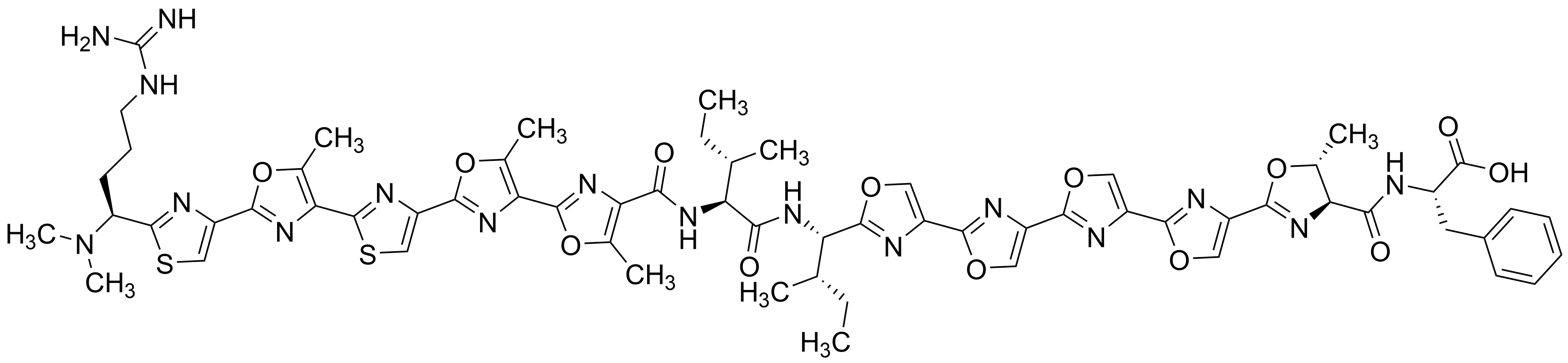

Names
- Other names plantazolicin A, PZN

Identifiers
CAS Number	1354655-37-0
3D model (JSmol)	Interactive image
ChemSpider	57643663
PubChem CID	139031015
- InChI: InChI=1S/C63H69N17O13S2/c1-11-28(3)43(74-51(83)46-31(6)93-59(77-46)47-32(7)91-56(78-47)41-27-95-61(73-41)48-33(8)92-57(79-48)40-26-94-60(72-40)42(80(9)10)19-16-20-66-63(64)65)49(81)75-44(29(4)12-2)58-71-38(24-89-58)54-69-36(22-87-54)52-68-37(23-86-52)53-70-39(25-88-53)55-76-45(30(5)90-55)50(82)67-35(62(84)85)21-34-17-14-13-15-18-34/h13-15,17-18,22-30,35,42-45H,11-12,16,19-21H2,1-10H3,(H,67,82)(H,74,83)(H,75,81)(H,84,85)(H4,64,65,66)/t28-,29-,30+,35-,42-,43-,44-,45-/m0/s1 Key: SKALCVOFYPVXLA-UCYFTIMGSA-N
- SMILES: CC[C@H](C)[C@@H](c1nc(co1)c2nc(co2)c3nc(co3)c4nc(co4)C5=N[C@@H](C(O5)C)C(=O)N[C@@H](Cc6ccccc6)C(=O)O)NC(=O)C([C@@H](C)CC)NC(=O)c7c(oc(n7)c8c(oc(n8)c9csc(n9)c1c(oc(n1)c1csc(n1)[C@H](CCCNC(=N)N)N(C)C)C)C)C

Properties
Chemical formula	C_{63}H_{69}N_{17}O_{13}S_{2}
Molar mass	1336.47 g·mol^{−1}
- Except where otherwise noted, data are given for materials in their standard state (at 25 °C [77 °F], 100 kPa). verify (what is ?) Infobox references

Plantazolicin (PZN) is a natural antibiotic produced by the gram-positive soil bacterium Bacillus velezensis FZB42 (previously Bacillus amyloliquefaciens FZB42). PZN has specifically been identified as a selective bactericidal agent active against Bacillus anthracis, the causative agent of anthrax. This natural product is a ribosomally synthesized and post-translationally modified peptide (RiPP); it can be classified further as a thiazole/oxazole-modified microcin (TOMM) or a linear azole-containing peptide (LAP).

The significance of PZN stems from its narrow-spectrum antibiotic activity. Most antibiotics in clinical use are broad-spectrum, acting against a wide variety of bacteria, and antibiotic resistance to these drugs is common. In contrast, PZN is antibacterial against only a small number of species, including Bacillus anthracis.

== History ==
The genes for the biosynthesis of PZN were first reported in 2008. The natural product was then isolated in 2011 from Bacillus amyloliquefaciens. The structure of PZN was solved later that year by two independent research groups, primarily through high-resolution mass spectrometry and NMR spectroscopy. In 2013, various biomimetic chemical synthesis studies of PZN were reported, including a total synthesis.

== Biosynthesis ==
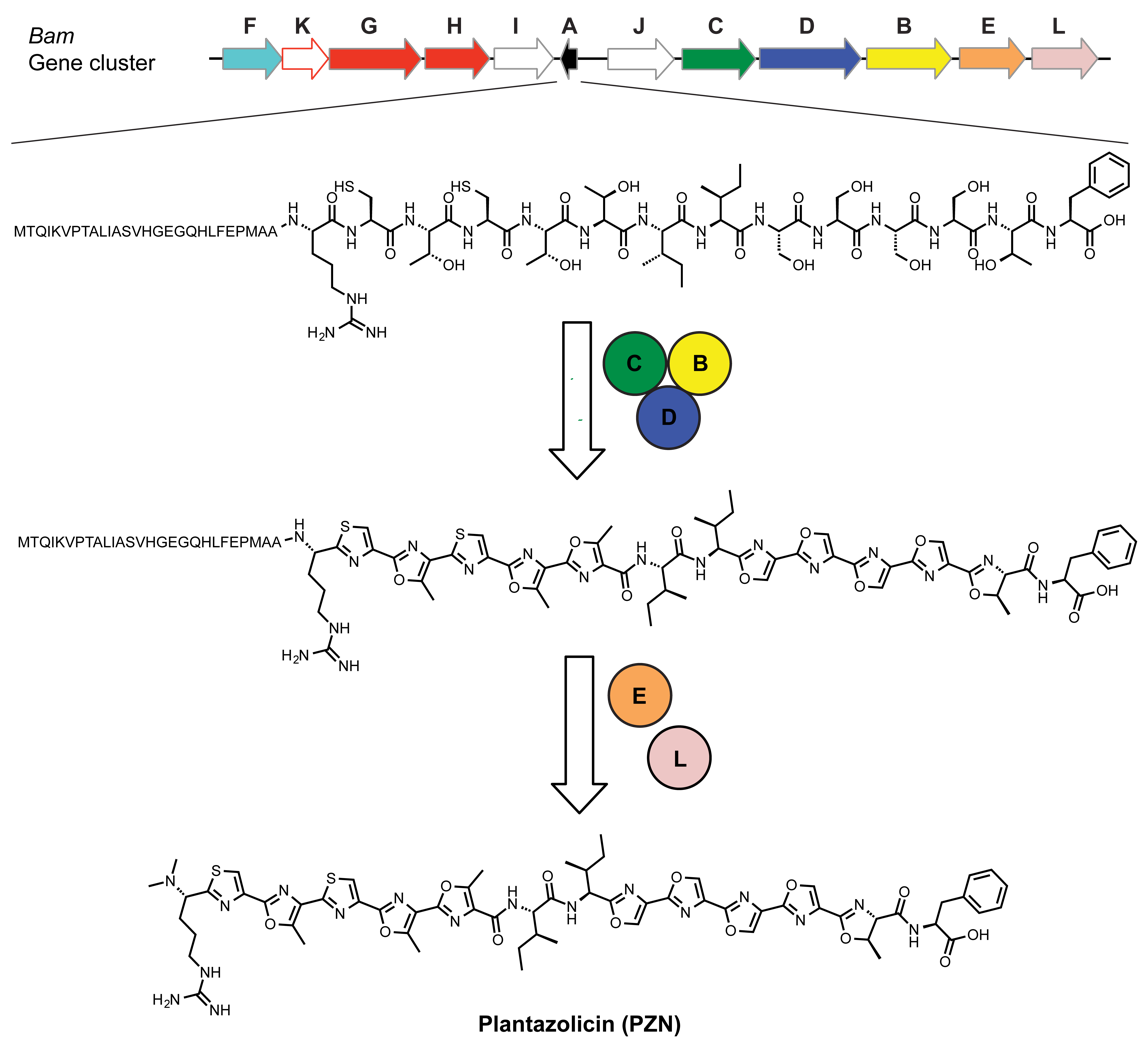
The biosynthesis of plantazolicin (PZN) entails modification of a precursor peptide by several enzymes.

In bacteria, plantazolicin (PZN) is synthesized first as an unmodified peptide via translation at the ribosome. A series of enzymes then chemically alter the peptide to install its post-translational modifications, including several azole heterocycles and an N-terminal amine dimethylation.

Specifically, during the biosynthesis of PZN in B. velezensis, a ribosomally-synthesized precursor peptide undergoes extensive post-translational modification, including cyclodehydrations and dehydrogenations, catalyzed by a trimeric enzyme complex. This process converts cysteine and serine/threonine residues into thiazole and (methyl)oxazole heterocycles (as seen to the right).

The exact mechanism of the association of the trimeric enzyme complex with the N-terminal leader peptide region is not yet understood; however, it is thought that the leader peptide is cleaved from the core peptide putatively by the peptidase contained in the biosynthetic gene cluster. Following leader peptide removal, the newly formed N-terminus undergoes methylation to yield an Nα,Nα-dimethylarginine. This final modification results in mature PZN.

Other organisms such as Bacillus pumilus, Clavibacter michiganensis subsp. sepedonicus, Corynebacterium urealyticum , and Brevibacterium linens have been identified with similar gene clusters that have the potential to produce PZN-like molecules.
