= Myrmicacin =

Names
- IUPAC name 3-hydroxydecanoic acid
- Other names 3-Hydroxydecanoic acid; β-Hydroxydecanoic acid; beta-Hydroxydecanoic acid

Identifiers
CAS Number	14292-26-3
3D model (JSmol)	Interactive image
ChEBI	CHEBI:132983
ChEMBL	ChEMBL4448230
ChemSpider	24790
IUPHAR/BPS	5848
MeSH	C017552
PubChem CID	26612
UNII	IGH24U4AMF
CompTox Dashboard (EPA)	DTXSID40864486
- InChI: InChI=1S/C10H20O3/c1-2-3-4-5-6-7-9(11)8-10(12)13/h9,11H,2-8H2,1H3,(H,12,13) Key: FYSSBMZUBSBFJL-UHFFFAOYSA-N; InChI=1/C10H20O3/c1-2-3-4-5-6-7-9(11)8-10(12)13/h9,11H,2-8H2,1H3,(H,12,13) Key: FYSSBMZUBSBFJL-UHFFFAOYAJ
- SMILES: CCCCCCCC(CC(=O)O)O

Properties
Chemical formula	C_{10}H_{20}O_{3}
Molar mass	188.267 g·mol^{−1}
- Except where otherwise noted, data are given for materials in their standard state (at 25 °C [77 °F], 100 kPa). Infobox references

Myrmicacin, also known as 3-hydroxydecanoic acid, is a chemical compound of the β-hydroxycarboxylic acid class. It is named after the South American leaf-cutter ants (Myrmicinae) in which it was first discovered, but is also found in royal jelly. Myrmicacin is believed to act as a herbicide which prevents seeds collected by the ants from germinating within the nest. It is known to act as a GPR84 agonist.

== See also ==
- 3,10-Dihydroxydecanoic acid
- 3,11-Dihydroxydodecanoic acid
