= Surfactin =

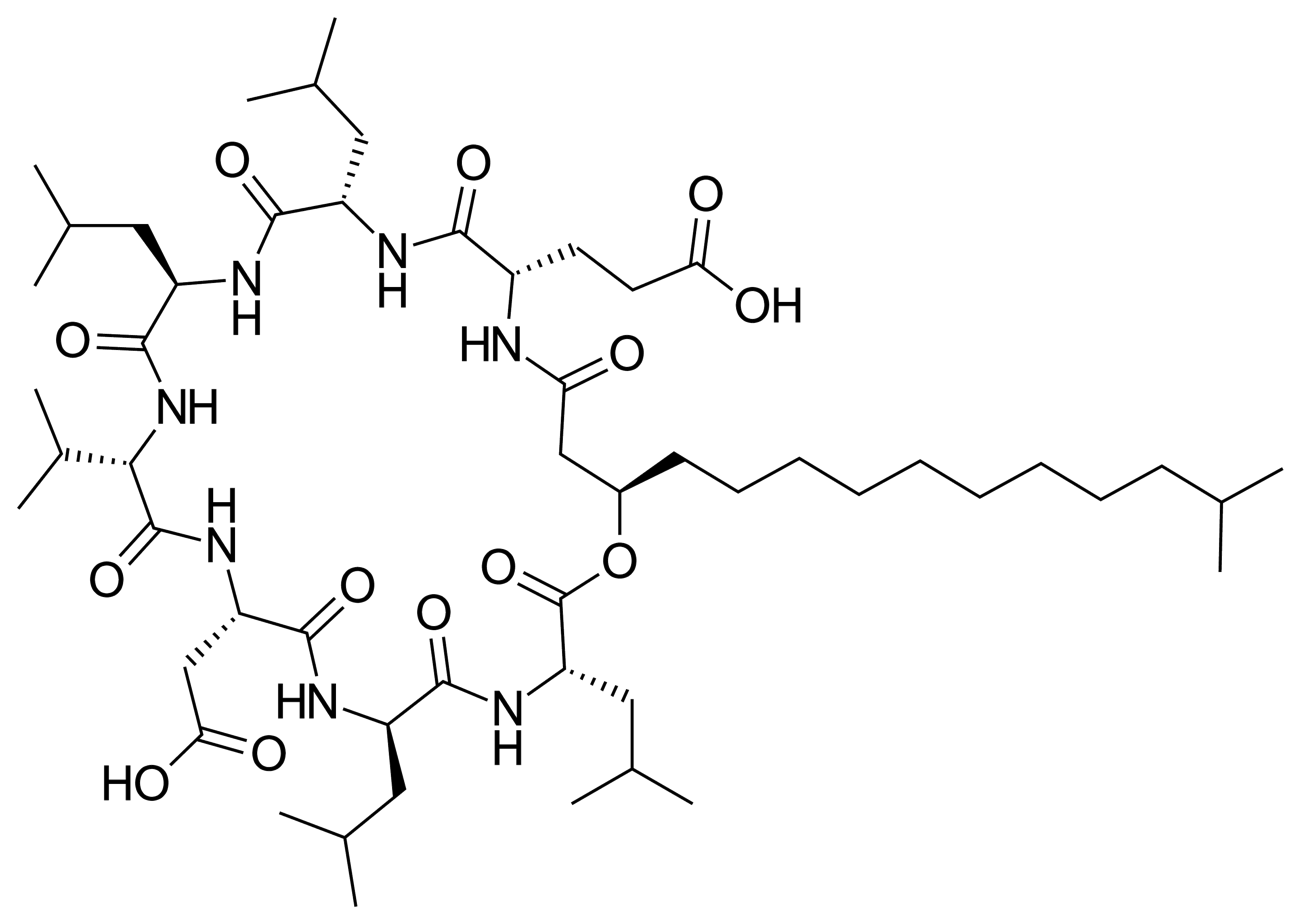

Identifiers
CAS Number	24730-31-2
3D model (JSmol)	Interactive image
ChEMBL	ChEMBL508272
ChemSpider	391754
ECHA InfoCard	100.110.185
PubChem CID	443592
UNII	E6T3DJ8ZVE
CompTox Dashboard (EPA)	DTXSID20893274
- InChI: InChI=1S/C53H93N7O13/c1-30(2)20-18-16-14-13-15-17-19-21-36-28-43(61)54-37(22-23-44(62)63)47(66)55-38(24-31(3)4)48(67)57-40(26-33(7)8)51(70)60-46(35(11)12)52(71)58-41(29-45(64)65)50(69)56-39(25-32(5)6)49(68)59-42(27-34(9)10)53(72)73-36/h30-42,46H,13-29H2,1-12H3,(H,54,61)(H,55,66)(H,56,69)(H,57,67)(H,58,71)(H,59,68)(H,60,70)(H,62,63)(H,64,65)/t36-,37+,38+,39-,40-,41+,42+,46+/m1/s1 Key: NJGWOFRZMQRKHT-WGVNQGGSSA-N; InChI=1/C53H93N7O13/c1-30(2)20-18-16-14-13-15-17-19-21-36-28-43(61)54-37(22-23-44(62)63)47(66)55-38(24-31(3)4)48(67)57-40(26-33(7)8)51(70)60-46(35(11)12)52(71)58-41(29-45(64)65)50(69)56-39(25-32(5)6)49(68)59-42(27-34(9)10)53(72)73-36/h30-42,46H,13-29H2,1-12H3,(H,54,61)(H,55,66)(H,56,69)(H,57,67)(H,58,71)(H,59,68)(H,60,70)(H,62,63)(H,64,65)/t36-,37+,38+,39-,40-,41+,42+,46+/m1/s1 Key: NJGWOFRZMQRKHT-WGVNQGGSBQ
- SMILES: CC(C)CCCCCCCCC[C@@H]1CC(=O)N[C@@H](CCC(=O)O)C(=O)N[C@@H](CC(C)C)C(=O)N[C@H](CC(C)C)C(=O)N[C@@H](C(C)C)C(=O)N[C@@H](CC(=O)O)C(=O)N[C@H](CC(C)C)C(=O)N[C@@H](CC(C)C)C(=O)O1

Properties
Chemical formula	C_{53}H_{93}N_{7}O_{13}
Molar mass	1036.3 g/mol
- Surface tension
CMC	9.4 × 10^{−6} M (pH 8.7)
- Except where otherwise noted, data are given for materials in their standard state (at 25 °C [77 °F], 100 kPa). Infobox references

Identifiers
- Symbol: N/A
- TCDB: 1.D.11
- OPM superfamily: 163
- OPM protein: 2npv

Surfactin is a cyclic lipopeptide, commonly used as an antibiotic for its capacity as a surfactant. It is an amphiphile capable of withstanding hydrophilic and hydrophobic environments. The Gram-positive bacterial species Bacillus subtilis produces surfactin for its antibiotic effects against competitors. Surfactin showcases antibacterial, antiviral, antifungal, and hemolytic effects.

== Structure and Synthesis ==
The structure consists of a peptide loop of seven amino acids (L-glutamic acid, L-leucine, D-leucine, L-valine, L-aspartic acid, D-leucine, and L-leucine) and a β-hydroxy fatty acid of variable length, thirteen to fifteen carbon atoms long. The glutamic acid and aspartic acid residues give the ring its hydrophilic character, as well as its negative charge. Conversely, the valine residue extends down, facing the fatty acid chain, to form a major hydrophobic domain. Below critical micellar concentrations (CMCs), the fatty acid tail can extend freely into solution, participating in hydrophobic interactions within micelles. This antibiotic is synthesized by a linear nonribosomal peptide synthetase, surfactin synthetase (Q04747). In solution, it has a characteristic "horse saddle" conformation (PDB: 2NPV) that explains its large spectrum of biological activity.

== Physical properties ==
=== Surface tension ===
Surfactin, like other surfactants, affects the surface tension of liquids in which it is dissolved. It can lower the water's surface tension from 72 mN/m to 27 mN/m at concentrations as low as 20 μM. Surfactin accomplishes this effect by occupying the intermolecular space between water molecules, decreasing the attractive forces between adjacent water molecules, mainly hydrogen bonds, to increase the solution's fluidity. This property makes surfactin and other surfactants useful as detergents and soaps.

=== Molecular mechanisms ===
There are three prevailing hypotheses for how surfactin works.

==== Cation-carrier effect ====
The cation-carrier effect is characterized by surfactin's ability to drive monovalent and divalent cations through an organic barrier. The two acidic residues aspartate and glutamate form a "claw" to stabilize divalent cations, such as Ca^{2+} ions used as an assembly template for the formation of micelles. When surfactin penetrates the outer sheet, its fatty acid chain interacts with the acyl chains of the phospholipids, orienting its headgroup toward the phospholipids' polar heads. Attachment of a cation causes the complex to cross the bilipidic layer using flippase enzymes. The headgroup aligns itself with the phospholipids of the inner sheet and the fatty acid chain interacts with the phospholipids acyl chains. The cation is then delivered into the intracellular medium.

==== Pore-forming effect ====
The pore-forming (ion channel) effect is characterized by the formation of cationic channels. It requires surfactin to self-associate inside the membrane since it cannot span across the cellular membrane. Under a hypothesis focused on uncharged membranes with minimal activation energy required to cross between inner and outer leaflets, molecular self-assembly would form a channel structure.

==== Detergent effect ====
The detergent effect draws on surfactin's ability to insert its fatty acid chain into the phospholipid layer, disorganizing the cell membrane to increase its permeability. Insertion of several surfactin molecules into the membrane can lead to the formation of mixed micelles by self-association and bilayer influenced by fatty chain hydrophobicity ultimately leading to bilayer solubilization.

== Biological properties ==
=== Antibacterial and antiviral properties ===
Surfactin is a broad-spectrum antibiotic with detergent-like activity increasing the permeability of cell membranes in all bacteria, regardless of their Gram stain classification. The minimum inhibitory concentration (MIC) of surfactin is between 12-50 μg/ml.

Surfactin is also capable of degrading viral envelope lipids and forming ion channels in the inner capsid with experimental evidence showing inhibition of HIV and HSV. However, surfactin can only degrade viruses when they are outside of host cells. Furthermore, when the environment is packed with proteins and lipids, surfactin faces a buffer effect lowering its antiviral activity.

=== Toxicity ===
Surfactin has non-specific cytotoxicity, causing lysis through disruption to the phospholipid bilayer present in all cells. When injected into humans as an intravascular antibiotic at concentrations at or above the LD_{50} of 40-80 μM, surfactin has hemolytic effects.

== See also ==
- Mycosubtilin
