= Lipopeptide =

Compound consisting of a short peptide chain conjugated with an acyl chain

Cyclic lipopeptide antibiotics

Identifiers
- Symbol: N/A
- TCDB: 1.D.15
- OPM superfamily: 163
- OPM protein: 1t5n

A lipopeptide is a molecule consisting of a lipid connected to a peptide. They are able to self-assemble into different structures. Many bacteria produce these molecules as a part of their metabolism, especially those of the genus Bacillus, Pseudomonas and Streptomyces. Certain lipopeptides are used as antibiotics. Due to the structural and molecular properties such as the fatty acid chain, it poses the effect of weakening the cell function or destroying the cell. Other lipopeptides are toll-like receptor agonists. Certain lipopeptides can have strong antifungal and hemolytic activities. It has been demonstrated that their activity is generally linked to interactions with the plasma membrane, and sterol components of the plasma membrane could play a major role in this interaction. It is a general trend that adding a lipid group of a certain length (typically C10–C12) to a lipopeptide will increase its bactericidal activity. Lipopeptides with a higher amount of carbon atoms, for example 14 or 16, in its lipid tail will typically have antibacterial activity as well as anti-fungal activity. Therefore, an increase in the alkyl chain can make lipopeptides soluble in water. As well, it opens the cell membrane of the bacteria, so antimicrobial activity can take place.

Lipopeptide detergents (LPDs) are composed of amphiphiles and two alkyl chains which are located on the last part of the peptide backbone. They were designed to mimic the architecture of the native membranes in which two alkyl chains in a lipid molecule facially interact with the hydrophobic segment of MPs.

Fully synthetic lipopeptides have been developed as drugs with semaglutide being a prominent example.

== Examples ==
- Bacillomycin
- Daptomycin
- Echinocandins (e.g., caspofungin)
- Iturin
- Mycosubtilin
- Surfactin
