= Aquimarina pacifica =

Scientific classification
- Domain: Bacteria
- Kingdom: Pseudomonadati
- Phylum: Bacteroidota
- Class: Flavobacteriia
- Order: Flavobacteriales
- Family: Flavobacteriaceae
- Genus: Aquimarina
- Species: A. pacifica

Binomial name
- Aquimarina pacifica Zhang et al. 2014

Type strain
- CGMCC 1.12180, JCM 18214, SW150

Species of bacterium

Aquimarina pacifica is a Gram-negative, strictly aerobic, rod-shaped bacterium from the genus Aquimarina which has been isolated from seawater from the South Pacific Gyre from the Pacific Ocean.
