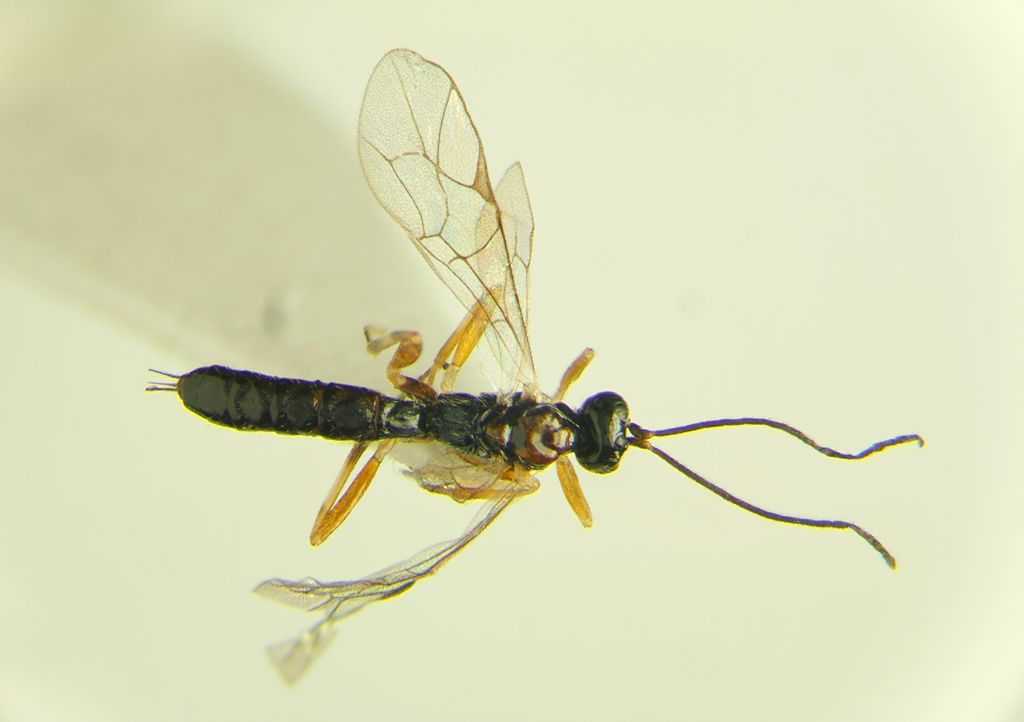

Scientific classification
- Kingdom: Animalia
- Phylum: Arthropoda
- Clade: Pancrustacea
- Class: Insecta
- Order: Hymenoptera
- Family: Ichneumonidae
- Genus: Zatypota
- Species: Z. percontatoria

Binomial name
- Zatypota percontatoria Mueller, 1776

= Zatypota percontatoria =

Species of wasp

Zatypota percontatoria is a species of parasitoid wasps that is part of the order Hymenoptera and the family Ichneumonidae responsible for parasitizing arachnids, specifically those of the family Theridiidae.

The parasitoid has been recently studied for its mechanism of parasitism. It reproduces by laying eggs within the abdomen of a spider by oviposition, slowly developing as an ectoparasitic koinobiont that will eventually kill its host. The wasp larva protects itself during the parasitism process through neuroparasitism affecting and controlling the behavior of the spider to the extent that they are unable to attack the larva. The mechanism is still fairly unknown, but it is believed that it involves hormones and/or polydnaviruses. The larva will influence the spider to the extent that it will build a web/cocoon for the pupal stage of the parasitoid wasp. Z. percontatoria wasps are distributed worldwide within several different countries, mostly within terrestrial locations that are rich with tree species preferring woodlands.

Members of the order Hymenoptera are both parasitic and non-parasitic as some families continued to evolve as parasites while others lost parasitism as a trait. The family Ichneumonidae is one of the largest in the animal world, containing over 20,000 species that have been described or identified in some way. Although it is difficult to pin down exactly how many species there are within the family, there have been estimates that range from 60,000 to over 100,000.

== Morphology ==
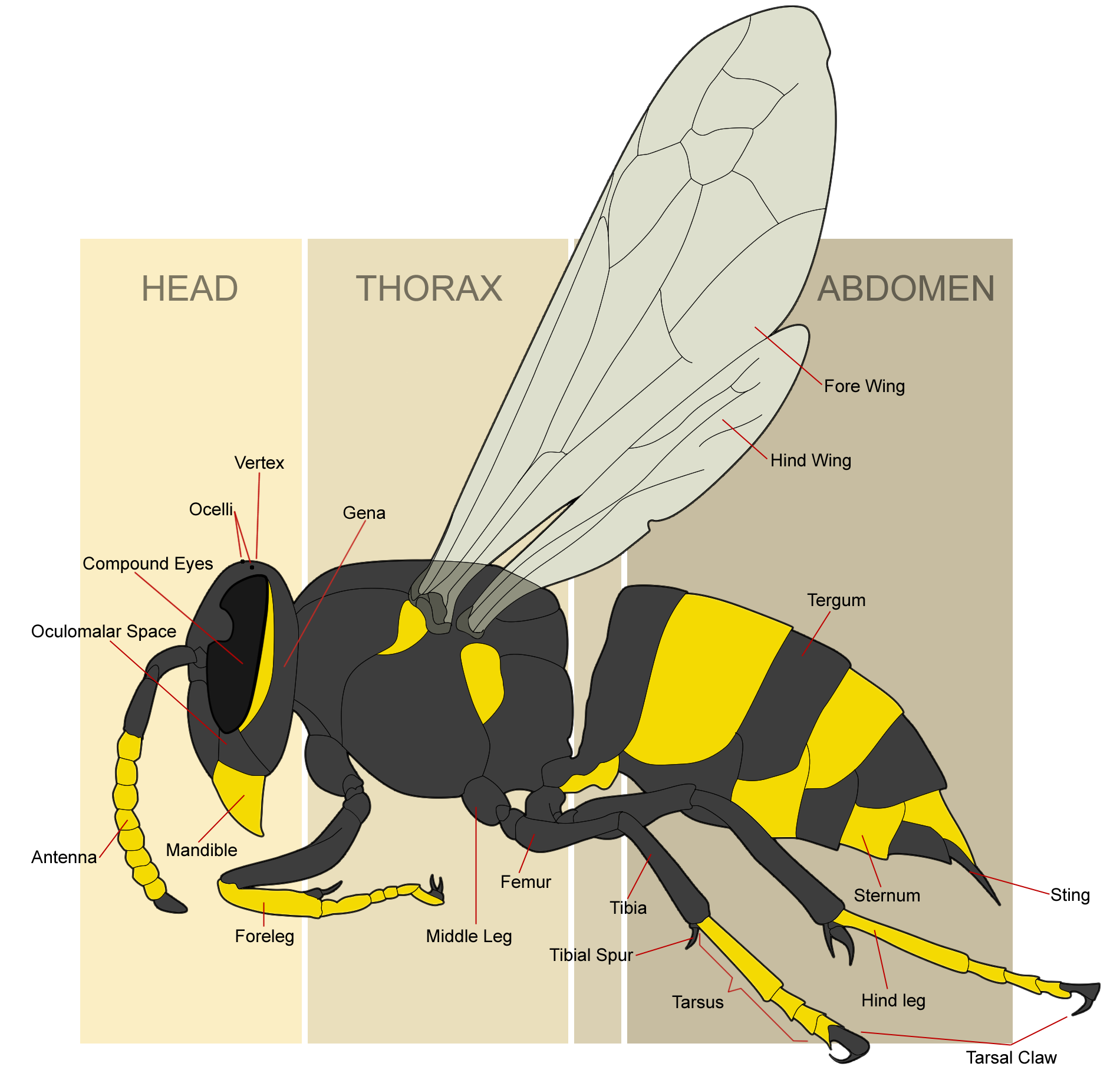
General example of wasp morphology

Z. percontatoria is symmetrical with the females being generally larger. The flagellum, which are the antenna on the wasp's head excluding some of the base section, has around 18-20 segments in the female. The head, as well as most parts of the body, is covered with small hairs known as pubescence. This is especially long around the mouth of the wasp. The area covering the head of the wasp has a grainy exterior. The eyes are bare to the environment and the head appears to be convex upon further inspection. However, the head converges downward when viewed from the lateral side. In the jaw or mandible, the upper tooth is longer and wider than the lower tooth. The head is black with yellowish white sections with the flagellum being light brown.

The mesosoma is rather rigid in terms of flexibility. There can be wrinkles seen increasing closer to the different ends of wasp's mesosoma. The pubescence are shorter on the mesosoma compared to the head. The hairs are short so that the mesosoma appears to be smooth and bare. The mesosoma is a darkened and reddish brown, with yellowish white sections. The legs are a pale brown.

The wasp has two pairs of membranous wings, which are held to the body by small hooks. Veins run through the wings. The fore wings are larger than the hind wings. The average female fore wing length is 3.0-3.8 mm. The legs are slender and held together by segments. The metasoma goes back breaking into five different parts. The wasp will get skinnier the closer to the caudal end. The ovipositor is black and brown. The ovipositor has a strong, slender base that thickens to a tapered point medially used for quick insertion. The wings are brown and clear in the sections that are mainly membranous. The metasoma like the mesosoma is a darkened and reddish brown.

Male Z. percontatoria wasps are similar to females except that they are smaller and darker in color. The flagellum for the males contain 18 segments and they have an average fore wing length of 2.9 mm.

Larvae are usually a pale yellowish white. There are small differences between the parasitic wasps as they are distributed around the world, but this description mainly refers to the Z. percontatoria native to Japan.

== Lifecycle ==
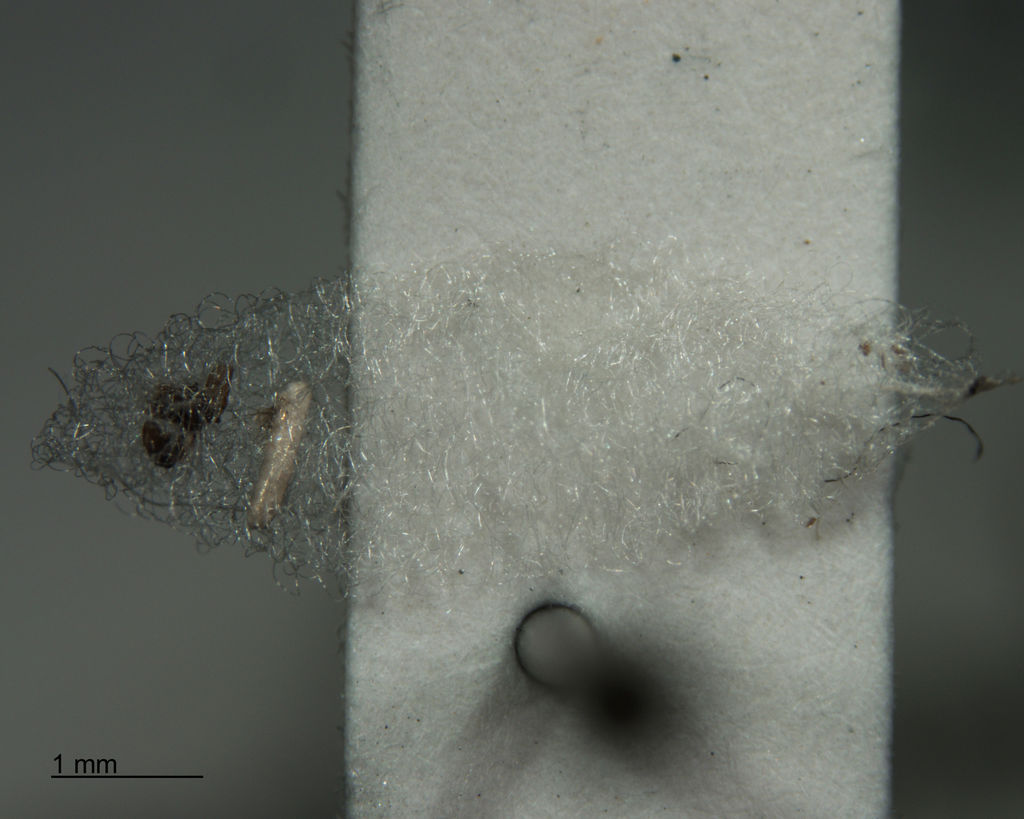
Silk cocoon of Zatypota percontatoria (RMNH.INS.593327), preserved specimen - BDJ.1.e992

The lifecycle begins when a female wasp is able to successfully oviposit an egg within the abdomen of a spider within the family Theridiidae. Z. percontatoria is a unique species in that although the wasps are koinobionts, they are one of the rare cases of being ectoparasitic as well. Although the egg begins inside of the spider, eventually it will hatch into a larva. It does not use an immobilization or paralyzing agent, so the spider develops as the egg/larva develops. As time progresses, the larva bursts out of the spider and continues as an ectoparasitoid. The larva will develop using the nutrients from the spider's hemolymph. When the larva moves out of the abdomen, it remains connected to the hemolymph for nutrients as an ectoparasitoid. How large the larva gets ultimately depends on the size and nutrient availability of the spider.

The spider may continue to forage and take part in activities that ultimately increase the fitness of the larva. However, Z. percontatoria has to be careful because it have to protect itself and the spider from their predators. The spider when it is parasitized is not able to defend itself as it could before it was parasitized. The mechanism is unknown as to how the larva is able to alter the behavior of the spider, but there are multiple hypotheses. One is that it may be controlling the central nervous system directly through the influence of neurons, although it is unlikely as Z. percontatoria connects to the hemolymph not directly associated with the nervous system.

The more likely of the hypotheses is that Z. percontatoria is not controlling the spider directly but influencing it through hormones in the endocrine system by activating certain pathways of the spider. The spider does not exhibit any behaviors that are outside of its normal scope, however the usual timing of the behaviors is altered. This is because the larva is using the spider's behaviors to increase its fitness and chance of survival. By increasing the levels of hormones that promote certain actions, the larva alters the normal behavior of the spider to its advantage. The larva also has a mutualistic relationship with polydnaviruses that suppresses the immune system preventing it from making any counter-action. However, if the larva is ever removed the spider returns to normal control and behaviors. The longer that a larva is able to remain on a spider, the longer it will take that spider to recover if the larva is taken off. This action also supports the hypothesis that the change in behavior is most likely the result of an accumulation of hormones stimulated or released by the larva.

Before the spider is fully able to reach adulthood, the larva enters the pupal stage. This stage is the most vulnerable state of the parasitoid wasp's lifecycle. This is the part of the lifecycle that explains why Z. percontatoria prefers the web-building spiders of the family Theridiidae. The larva will begin influencing the spider to build a web. Scientists hypothesize that the larva is somehow able to increase levels of the hormone that encourages behaviors that the spider would conduct before molting or ecdysis. This hormone is elevated levels of 20-OH-ecysone. The web is not the typical type used for capturing prey, but resembles a web similar to one that it would build before overwintering. The web can be seen to be shorter for a stronger build, thickened webs that won't break, and a reinforced frame. The web is stronger, defense-based, and depending on the spider will create a cocoon that will house the larva. This will aid the fitness of the larva when it enters the pupal stage by creating a camouflage, and protecting it from predators and the outside conditions of the environment.

When the web is done, the larva kills the spider host and consumes its body. The larva is then ready to enter the cocoon where a metamorphosis takes place. The pupa will emerge as an adult wasp, usually female as they are able to reproduce starting the cycle again. As an adult, the wasps mainly feed on nectar. Some larva will overwinter during winter. The active months of Z. percontatoria are between March and November varying depending on the climate of the geographical location.

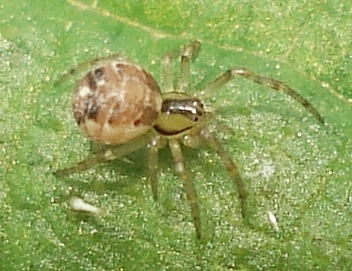
Example of web-building spider from the family Theridiidae (Theridion impressum)

== Host-parasite dynamic ==
Z. percontatoria, like many parasitoids, is host specific with a narrow range. Z. percontatoria parasitizes members of the arthropod family Theridiidae. The specific host species for Z. percontatoria in a given area varies depending the species of the family Theridiidae that are abundant within that area. Spiders as hosts are able hunters making them difficult prey to parasitize. An additional factor adding to the level of difficulty in ovipositing is that the spider is usually the same size if not larger than the wasp. The wasp has to be big enough to be able to handle itself in a battle with the spider and precise enough to oviposit an egg in the abdomen of the spider. If the wasp is not careful, it will get injured and/or be unsuccessful in an attempt to parasitize the spider. Z. percontatoria prefers female spiders because they forage more than males leading to increased nutrients that the host can provide. The wasps increase their chances by usually parasitizing juvenile spiders that are less able to defend themselves against the wasp. Juvenile spiders are also preferred due to the koinobiont lifecycle of the wasp. On average, they will spend around 34 days parasitizing a host. So adult spiders are better able to defend themselves and may die before parasitism is complete. On the other hand, infant spiders cannot handle the stress of the parasitism. However, Z. percontatoria wasps are adaptable and will change its habits based on the climate, size of the spider population, and the abundance of spiders. As parasitoids, the wasps will keep the spider population stable as to promote a better fitness for itself. There is a correlation between the number of parasitized spider and the abundance of the population. The more spiders there are, the higher the number of spiders that are parasitized. Warmer climates promote faster lifecycles and colder climates will take longer for the lifecycle to be complete. Parasitic wasps are unable to reproduce and survive at any temperatures at or below 5 degrees Celsius.

The rate of parasitism within a given spider population is low, usually around 1%. Spiders will defend themselves and without an immobilization agent are difficult to parasitize. Mortality rates are highest in the egg and larval stages of the parasitoid wasp as well so they may die before they get the chance to finish their lifecycle. Also unless they are able successfully camouflage or protect themselves, predators in the environment can take advantage and kill them as well. With its parasitoid lifecycle taking a great deal of time, there is much that could go wrong resulting in mortality. These are fairly recent studies that need further research to back up and confirm.

== Habitat and distribution ==
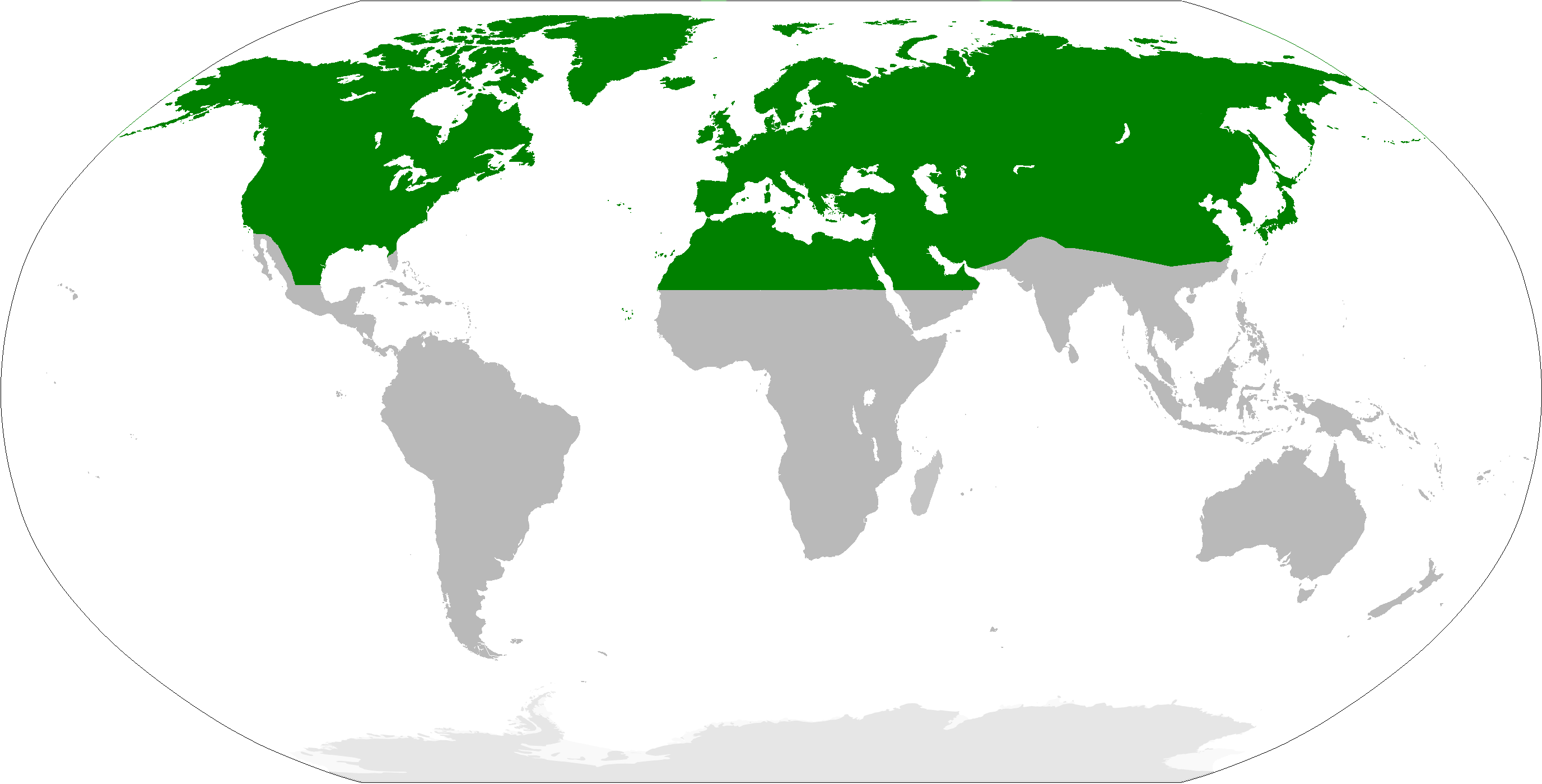
Map of Holarctic areas.

Z. percontatoria is Holarctic in distribution. The parasitoid wasps prefer terrestrial woodland locations with a high population of trees. The parasitoid wasp is found in equal distribution in the understory or in the leaves of the canopy, as web-building spiders can be found in both levels. An abundance of plant species and numbers promote species diversity including those of parasitoids and hosts. Parasitoid wasps, although located in many places in the world, are rarely the dominating population in terms of influence or numbers.

== Evolution and phylogeny ==
Evolution is a process where traits that increase the fitness of an organism are favored and therefore natural selection keeps them in the lineage creating speciation. So for parasites, it is most likely that the way that they harm and feed off another organism was beneficial to them and caused an evolutionary change. The environment most likely could not provide completely for the organism, forcing it to prey on another organism for nutrients forming what would be the basis for parasitism. The complexity of the strategies make it difficult to pin down exactly how they were created. In the order Hymenoptera, parasitoidism only evolved once. This created the bee, ant, and parasitoid wasp species that followed. Parasitism was lost in species that it did not benefit or add to their fitness. For the parasitoid wasps, evolution added a wasp waist and the ability to sting which formed the basis of the mechanisms that Z. percontatoria employs.
