= Aquimarina gracilis =

Scientific classification
- Domain: Bacteria
- Kingdom: Pseudomonadati
- Phylum: Bacteroidota
- Class: Flavobacteriia
- Order: Flavobacteriales
- Family: Flavobacteriaceae
- Genus: Aquimarina
- Species: A. gracilis

Binomial name
- Aquimarina gracilis Park et al. 2013

Type strain
- PSC32, JCM 17453, KCTC 23301

Species of bacterium

Aquimarina gracilis is a gram-negative, strictly aerobic and slender rod-shaped bacterium from the genus Aquimarina, which has been isolated from the gut microflora from the mussel Mytilus coruscus, which was collected from the Gwangyang Bay from the South Sea near Korea.
