= Megaterium =

Megaterium is a specific name used for several taxa of bacterium:

- Aquimarina megaterium, a bacterium from seawater
- Priestia megaterium (formerly Bacillus megaterium), a bacterium found in many habitats
- Gemmobacter megaterium, a bacterium from planktonic seaweed
- Marinospirillum megaterium, a bacterium from fermented brine

== See also ==
- Megatherium, a South American fossil mammal
