= Steroid 15beta-monooxygenase =

Class of enzymes

Identifiers
- EC no.: 1.14.15.8

Databases
- BRENDA: enzyme data
- ExPASy: NiceZyme view
- KEGG: enzyme entry
- MetaCyc: metabolic pathway
- Rhea: reactions
- PDB structures: RCSB PDB PDBe PDBsum
Search
- PMC: articles
- PubMed: articles
- NCBI: proteins

Steroid 15beta-monooxygenase (EC 1.14.15.8, cytochrome P-450meg, cytochrome P450meg, steroid 15beta-hydroxylase, CYP106A2, BmCYP106A2) is an enzyme with systematic name progesterone,reduced-ferredoxin:oxygen oxidoreductase (15beta-hydroxylating) . It catalyses the hydroxylation of some steroids, for example the conversion of progesterone to 15β-hydroxyprogesterone:

progesterone
+ 2 reduced
ferredoxin
O_{2}
H_{2}O
15β-hydroxyprogesterone
+ 2 oxidised
ferredoxin

The enzyme from Bacillus megaterium is an oxidoreductase which uses molecular oxygen to insert a hydroxy group at position 15β of steroids that have 3-oxo group and a double bond at position 4. It requires ferredoxin to transfer electrons to the cytochrome P450 active site.
