= Aquimarina mytili =

Scientific classification
- Domain: Bacteria
- Kingdom: Pseudomonadati
- Phylum: Bacteroidota
- Class: Flavobacteriia
- Order: Flavobacteriales
- Family: Flavobacteriaceae
- Genus: Aquimarina
- Species: A. mytili

Binomial name
- Aquimarina mytili Park et al. 2012

Type strain
- PSC33, JCM 17454, KCTC 23302

Species of bacterium

Aquimarina mytili is a Gram-negative, strictly aerobic, rod-shaped bacterium from the genus Aquimarina which has been isolated from the gut microflora of the mussel Mytilus coruscus which was collected from the Gwangyang Bay in Korea.
