= Aquimarina longa =

Scientific classification
- Domain: Bacteria
- Kingdom: Pseudomonadati
- Phylum: Bacteroidota
- Class: Flavobacteriia
- Order: Flavobacteriales
- Family: Flavobacteriaceae
- Genus: Aquimarina
- Species: A. longa

Binomial name
- Aquimarina longa Yu et al. 2013

Type strain
- CGMCC 1.11007, JCM 17859, SW024

Species of bacterium

Aquimarina longa is a Gram-negative, strictly aerobic and rod-shaped bacterium from the genus Aquimarina which has been isolated from seawater from the South Pacific Gyre.
