= Diaphragm =

Diaphragm may refer to:

== Anatomy ==
- Thoracic diaphragm, a thin sheet of muscle between the thorax and the abdomen
- Pelvic diaphragm or pelvic floor, a pelvic structure
- Urogenital diaphragm or triangular ligament, a pelvic structure

== Other ==
- Diaphragm (optics), a stop in the light path of a lens, having an aperture that regulates the amount of light that passes
- Diaphragm (acoustics), a thin, semi-rigid membrane that vibrates to produce or transmit sound waves
- Diaphragm (birth control), a small rubber dome placed in the vagina to wall off the cervix, thus preventing sperm from entering
- Diaphragm (mechanical device), a sheet of a semi-flexible material anchored at its periphery
- Diaphragm (structural system), a structural engineering system used to resist lateral loads

== See also ==
- Diaphragm arch
- Diaphragm pump
- Diaphragm seal, a membrane that seals an enclosure
- Diaphragm shutter, a type of leaf shutter consisting of a number of thin blades in a camera
- Diaphragm valve
- Diaphragm wall
- Diaphragma, a genus of algae
- Lamina (disambiguation)
- Membrane (disambiguation)
