= 6-acetylglucose deacetylase =

Class of enzymes

Identifiers
- EC no.: 3.1.1.33
- CAS no.: 37278-46-9

Databases
- BRENDA: enzyme data
- ExPASy: NiceZyme view
- KEGG: enzyme entry
- MetaCyc: metabolic pathway
- Rhea: reactions
- PDB structures: RCSB PDB PDBe PDBsum
- Gene Ontology: AmiGO / QuickGO
Search
- PMC: articles
- PubMed: articles
- NCBI: proteins

6-acetylglucose deacetylase (EC 3.1.1.33) is an enzyme that catalyzes the reaction

6-O-acetyl-β-D-glucose
H_{2}O
D-glucose
+
acetic acid

The enzyme characterised from Bacillus megaterium hydrolyses 6-O-acetyl-β-D-glucose to D-glucose and acetic acid.

This enzyme is a hydrolase, specifically one acting on carboxylic ester bonds. The systematic name of this enzyme class is 6-acetyl-D-glucose acetylhydrolase. This enzyme is also called 6-O-acetylglucose deacetylase.
