= Aquimarina seongsanensis =

Scientific classification
- Domain: Bacteria
- Kingdom: Pseudomonadati
- Phylum: Bacteroidota
- Class: Flavobacteriia
- Order: Flavobacteriales
- Family: Flavobacteriaceae
- Genus: Aquimarina
- Species: A. seongsanensis

Binomial name
- Aquimarina seongsanensis Oh et al. 2017

Type strain
- CBA3208, JCM 19529

Species of bacterium

Aquimarina seongsanensis is a Gram-negative and strictly aerobic bacterium from the genus Aquimarina which has been isolated from seawater from Jeju Island in Korea.
