= Aquimarina salinaria =

Scientific classification
- Domain: Bacteria
- Kingdom: Pseudomonadati
- Phylum: Bacteroidota
- Class: Flavobacteriia
- Order: Flavobacteriales
- Family: Flavobacteriaceae
- Genus: Aquimarina
- Species: A. salinaria

Binomial name
- Aquimarina salinaria Chen et al. 2012

Type strain
- antisso-27, BCRC 80080, LMG 25375

Species of bacterium

Aquimarina salinaria is a Gram-negative, aerobic and rod-shaped bacterium from the genus Aquimarina which has been isolated from a saltpan in Taiwan.
