= Aquimarina agarivorans =

Scientific classification
- Domain: Bacteria
- Kingdom: Pseudomonadati
- Phylum: Bacteroidota
- Class: Flavobacteriia
- Order: Flavobacteriales
- Family: Flavobacteriaceae
- Genus: Aquimarina
- Species: A. agarivorans

Binomial name
- Aquimarina agarivorans Zhou et al. 2015

Type strain
- ATCC BAA-2612, CICC 10835, HQM9

Species of bacterium

Aquimarina agarivorans is a Gram-negative, facultatively anaerobic and rod-shaped bacterium, from the genus Aquimarina. It has been isolated from the red algae Gelidium amansii, from the intertidal zone of Weihai in China.
