= Oceanic deserts =

Areas of low precipitation on the subtropical oceans

Oceanic deserts are regions of the oceans characterized by low annual precipitation, comparable to that of continental deserts. These areas typically overlap with subtropical gyres - large systems of circular ocean currents formed by the global wind patterns. These gyres are characterized by semi-permanent high-pressure systems, which inhibit the formation of deep precipitating clouds. Unlike continental deserts, oceanic deserts maintain a relatively high cloud fraction throughout the year. Despite the pronounced cloud cover, the low level shallow clouds over these areas produce very little precipitation, distinguishing these areas as oceanic deserts.

The term "desert" in this context not only refers to the low precipitation but also to the low biodiversity found in these regions. The oceanic circulation in these regions significantly impacts marine life, leading to lower productivity and biodiversity compared to other parts of the ocean.

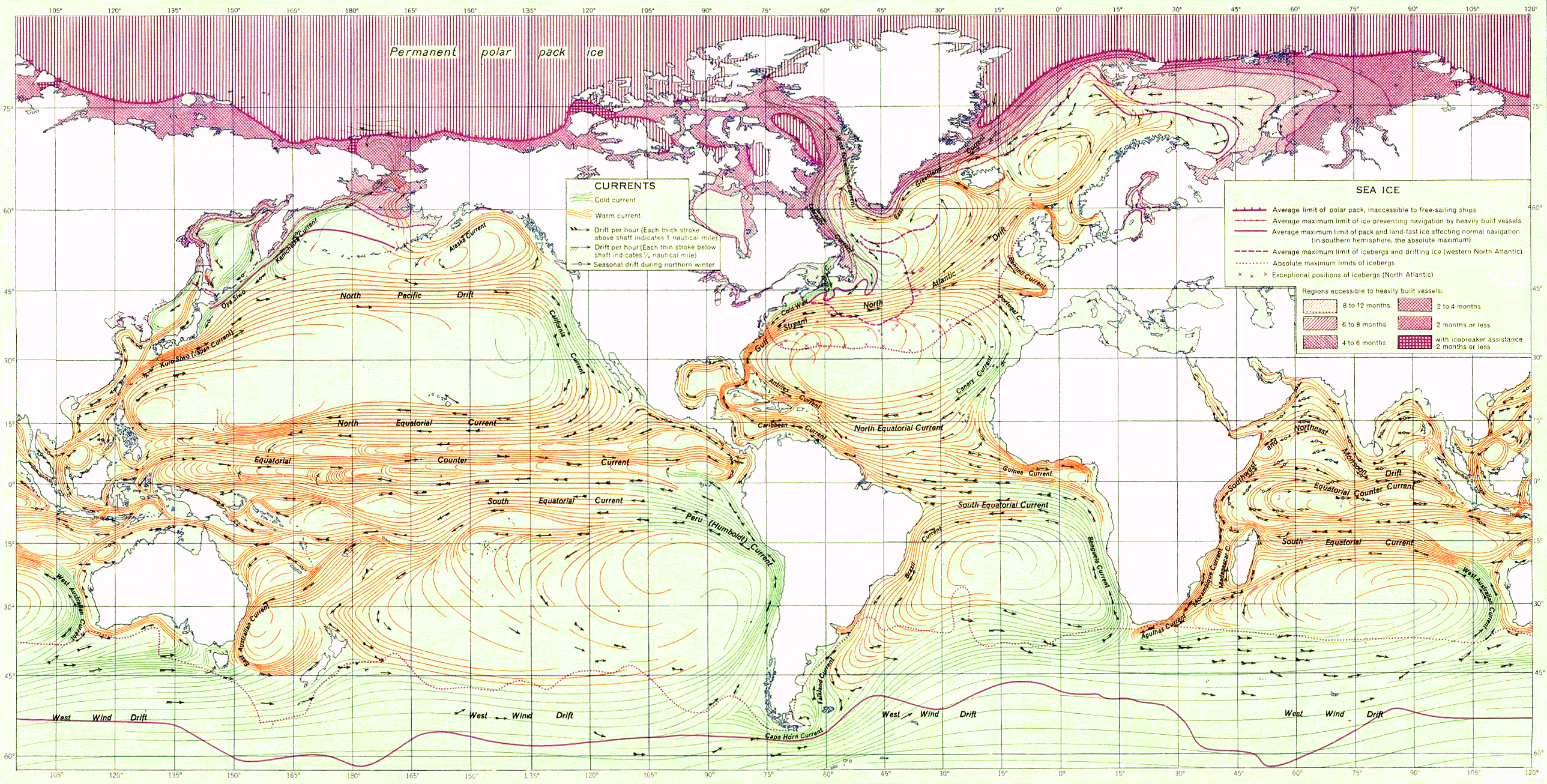
Ocean gyres and currents from Atlas of World Maps. (Army Service Forces Manual M-101, 1943)

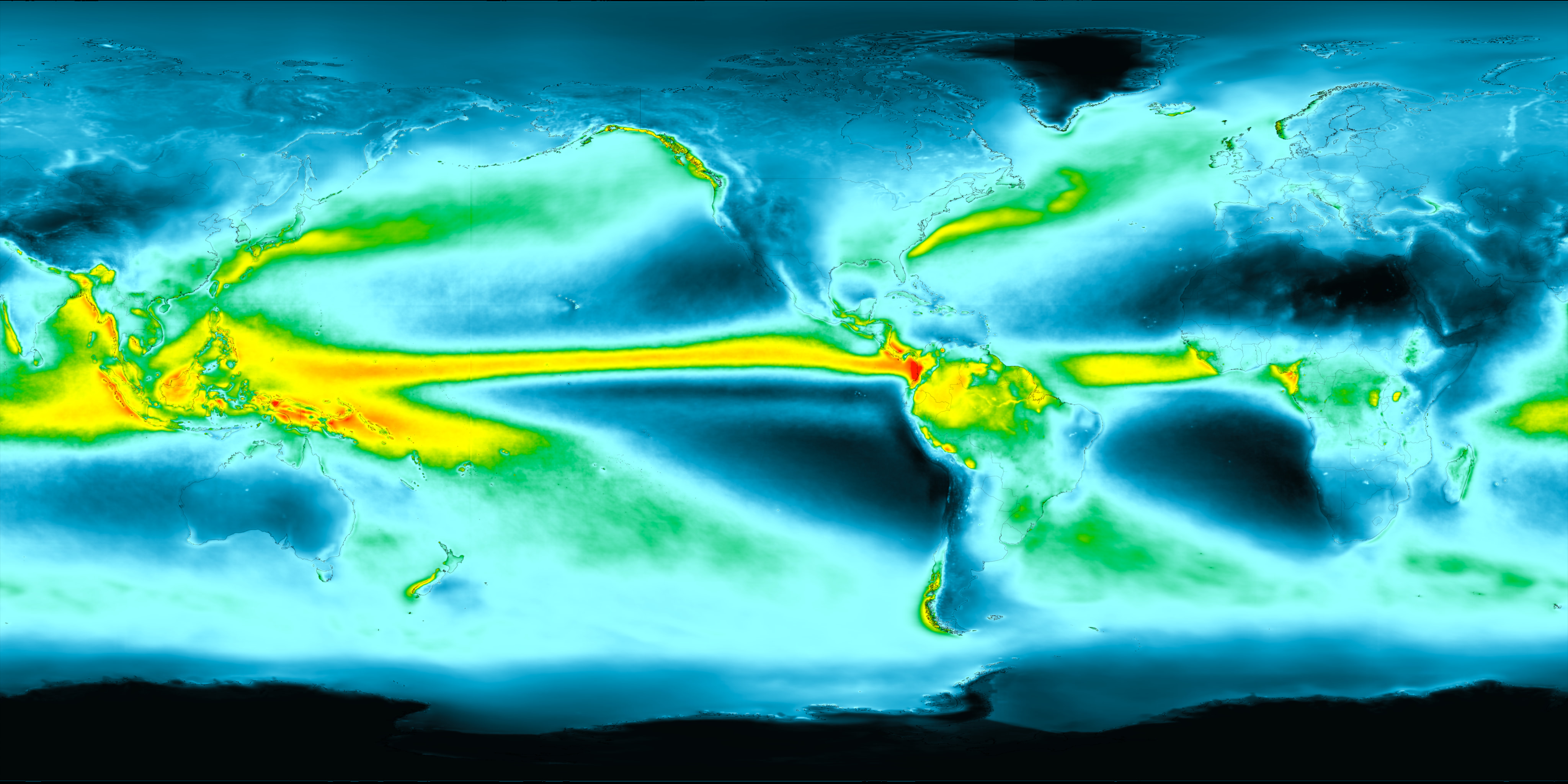
Figure 1: Global average annual precipitation. Dark blue areas indicating regions with low precipitation amount. The eastern basin of subtropical oceans are distinguished with low precipitation. (NASA SVS, 2023)

== Geographic distribution ==
Oceanic deserts are primarily found in the eastern subtropical oceans. The corresponding subtropical gyres are the North Atlantic Gyre extends from the eastern coast of North America to the western coast of Europe and Africa. The South Atlantic Gyre is located off the coast of South America, stretching towards Africa. The North Pacific Gyre spans from the western coast of North America to the eastern coast of Asia. The South Pacific Gyre is found off the coast of South America, extending to the western Pacific. The Indian Ocean Gyre is positioned between the eastern coast of Southern Africa and the western coast of Australia.

== Climatic and atmospheric conditions ==
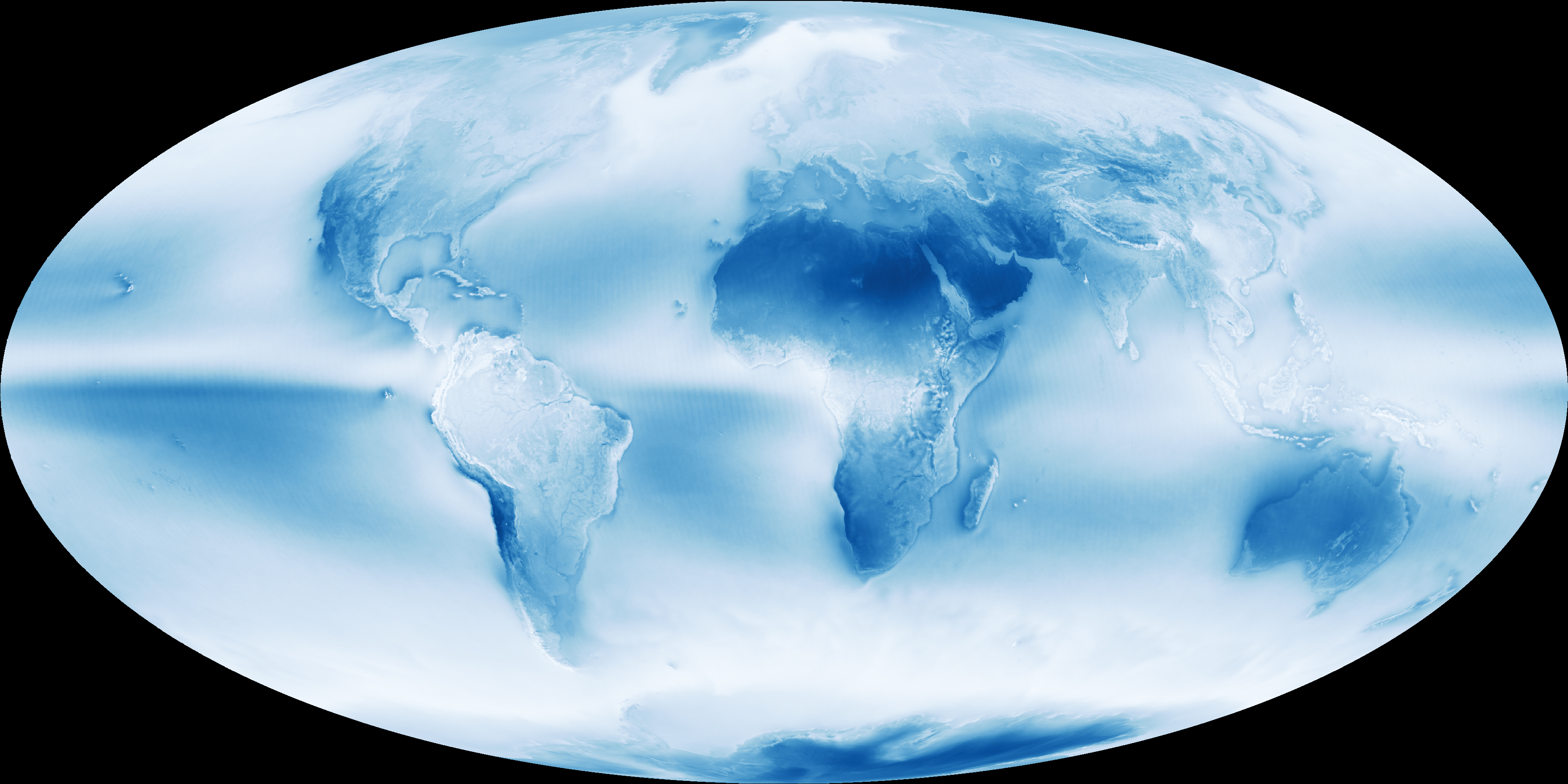
Figure 2: Average of all of the satellite’s cloud observations between July 2002 and April 2015. Colors range from dark blue (no clouds) to light blue (some clouds) to white (frequent clouds). (Earth Observatory NASA, 2015)

Oceanic deserts are influenced by several key atmospheric and climatic factors. Persistent high-pressure systems, known as subtropical highs, dominate these regions, leading to stable atmospheric conditions. The stable high-pressure zones prevent the development of deep convective clouds, which are necessary for rainfall. As a result, annual precipitation in oceanic deserts is minimal, comparable to the aridity observed in terrestrial deserts.

Despite the low precipitation, oceanic deserts maintain a relatively high cloud fraction throughout the year (see figure 2). Coastal regions typically see stratus clouds, while offshore areas are characterized by stratocumulus clouds. Over the relatively warm ocean to the west, trade-wind cumuli are common. The cloud cover in these regions is largely non-precipitating, contributing to the persistent dry conditions. This is in contrast to continental deserts, which generally have clear skies with occasional, but often intense, rainfall events.

A key feature of the atmospheric profile in oceanic deserts is the presence of the trade wind inversion. The vertical profiles of meteorological parameters such as temperature, humidity, and wind speed in oceanic deserts reveal sharp gradients at the inversion layer. This inversion layer, found at an altitude of about 1 to 2 kilometers, acts as a cap that limits vertical mixing and the development of deep convective clouds and thus contributes to the suppression of precipitation.

== Oceanographic features ==
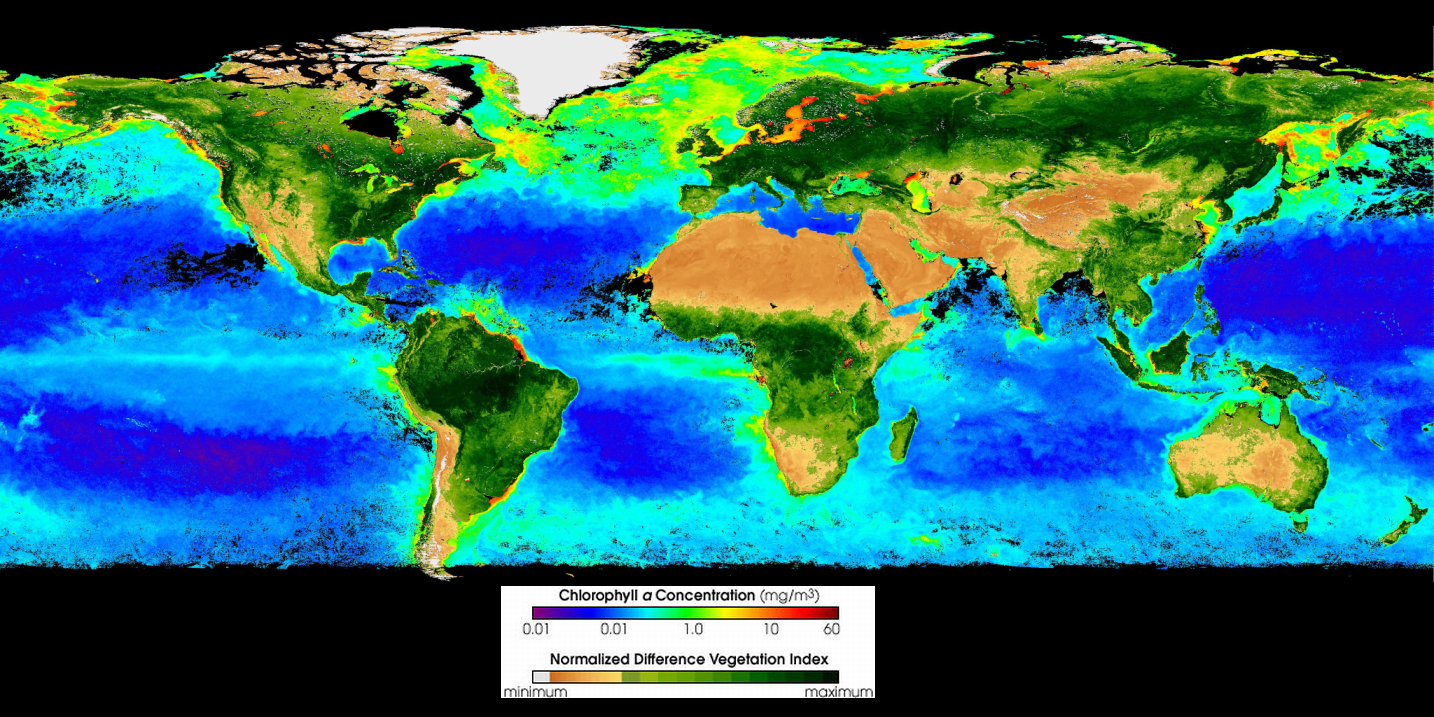
Figure 3: This composite image gives an indication of the magnitude and distribution of global primary production, both oceanic (mg/m3 chlorophyll a) and terrestrial (normalized difference land vegetation index). (Visible Earth NASA, 2009)

Oceanic deserts are depicted in dark blue on maps produced by NASA (see figures 1 and 3), indicating areas with low precipitation and low chlorophyll concentrations, highlighting their status as nutrient-starved oceanic regions. However, the coastal zones in these oceanic deserts have a relatively high productivity and biodiversity due to deposition of nutrient rich continental sediment by surface runoff as well as upwelling of cold ocean waters induced by prevailing winds and rising sea floors brings iron and other essential nutrients to the surface. This includes the equator zone.

The physical characteristics of oceanic deserts significantly influence their ecological dynamics. Strong stratification in these regions prevents the mixing of nutrient-rich deep waters with surface waters, maintaining nutrient-poor conditions at the surface. This stable stratification is a result of the warm, saline surface waters overlaying cooler and denser deep waters, which inhibits vertical mixing.

Nutrient depletion in subtropical gyres is primarily due to strong downwelling and particle sinking. In contrast, regions with the highest chlorophyll concentrations are found in cold waters, where nutrient-rich upwelling occurs, allowing phytoplankton to thrive.
