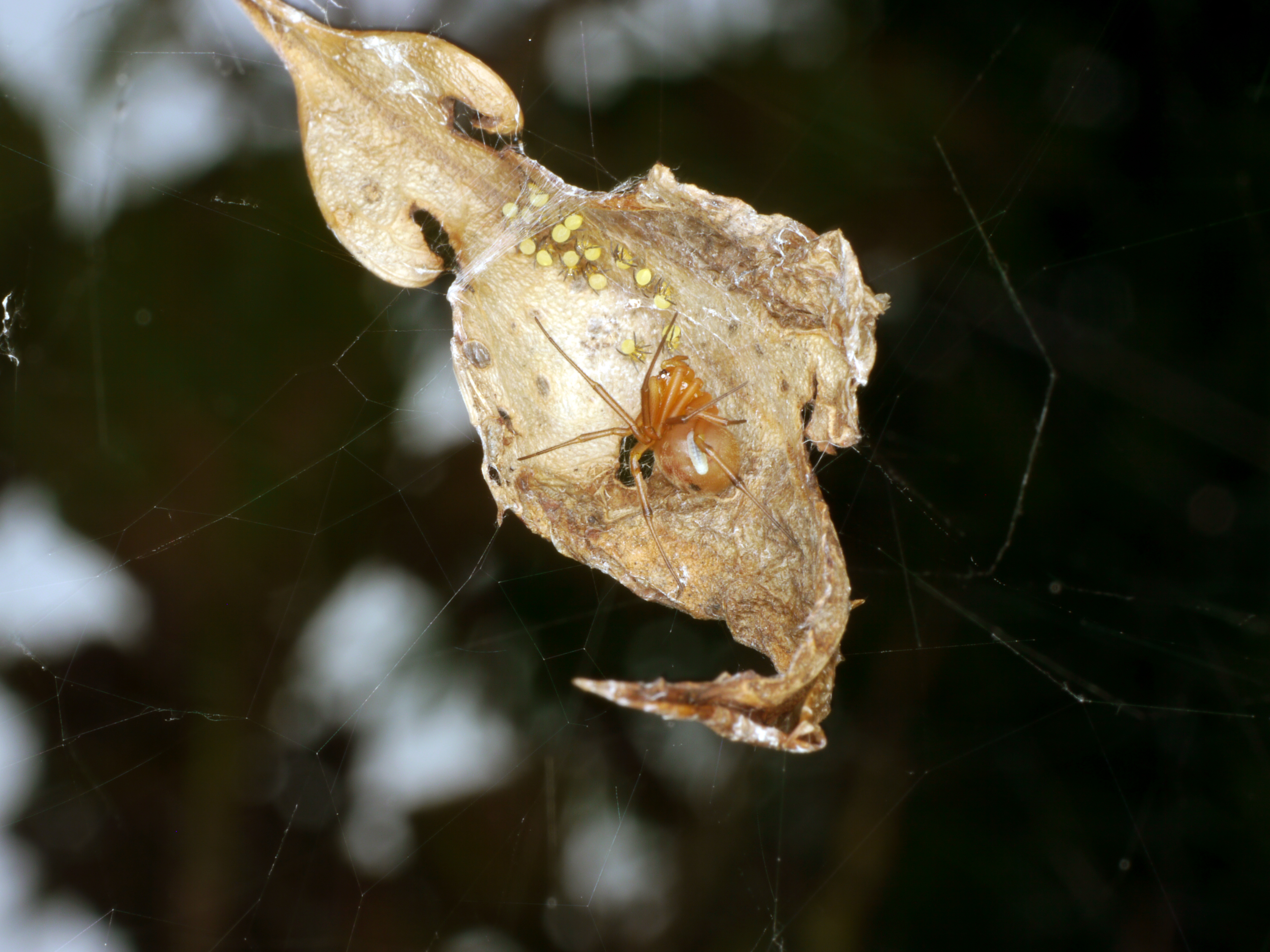
- A larva of Z. maculata upon the abdomen of N. japonica, hiding inside a retreat with her spiderlings.

Scientific classification
- Kingdom: Animalia
- Phylum: Arthropoda
- Clade: Pancrustacea
- Class: Insecta
- Order: Hymenoptera
- Family: Ichneumonidae
- Genus: Zatypota
- Species: Z. maculata

Binomial name
- Zatypota maculata Matsumoto & Takasuka, 2010

= Zatypota maculata =

Species of spiders

Zatypota maculata, which is a member of ichneumonid ectoparasitoids of spiders, called the Polysphincta-group (Hymenoptera, Ichneumonidae, Pimplinae), is endemic to Japan and utilizes exclusively Nihonhimea japonica (Araneae, Theridiidae) as host.

== Oviposition behavior ==
Oviposition behavior of Zatypota maculata toward its host spider, N. japonica, is highly adapted to a knockdown 3D web. Nihonhimea japonica constructs a characteristic web called the ‘knockdown 3D web’, which consists of a non‐viscid intricate 3D cobweb, a retreat made of a dead leaf at the center, and a dense non‐viscid sheet web at the bottom that serves as a capturing device (the video of the typical prey capturing behavior by the knockdown 3D web is available here). To cope with this specific web, Z. maculata has evolved two types of tactics; the one is creeping-style while the other is diving-style.

The creeping-style is that the wasp climbs the 3D cobweb, creeps up slowly onto the spider's retreat, taking a long time so that the spider does not escape, and finally enters the retreat to sting the spider (the video of the typical creeping-style is available here). The diving-style is that the wasp dives from outside of the web onto the sheet, as a knocked-down prey item would, to lure the spider out, before stinging it at the moment of contact (the video of the typical diving-style is available here).

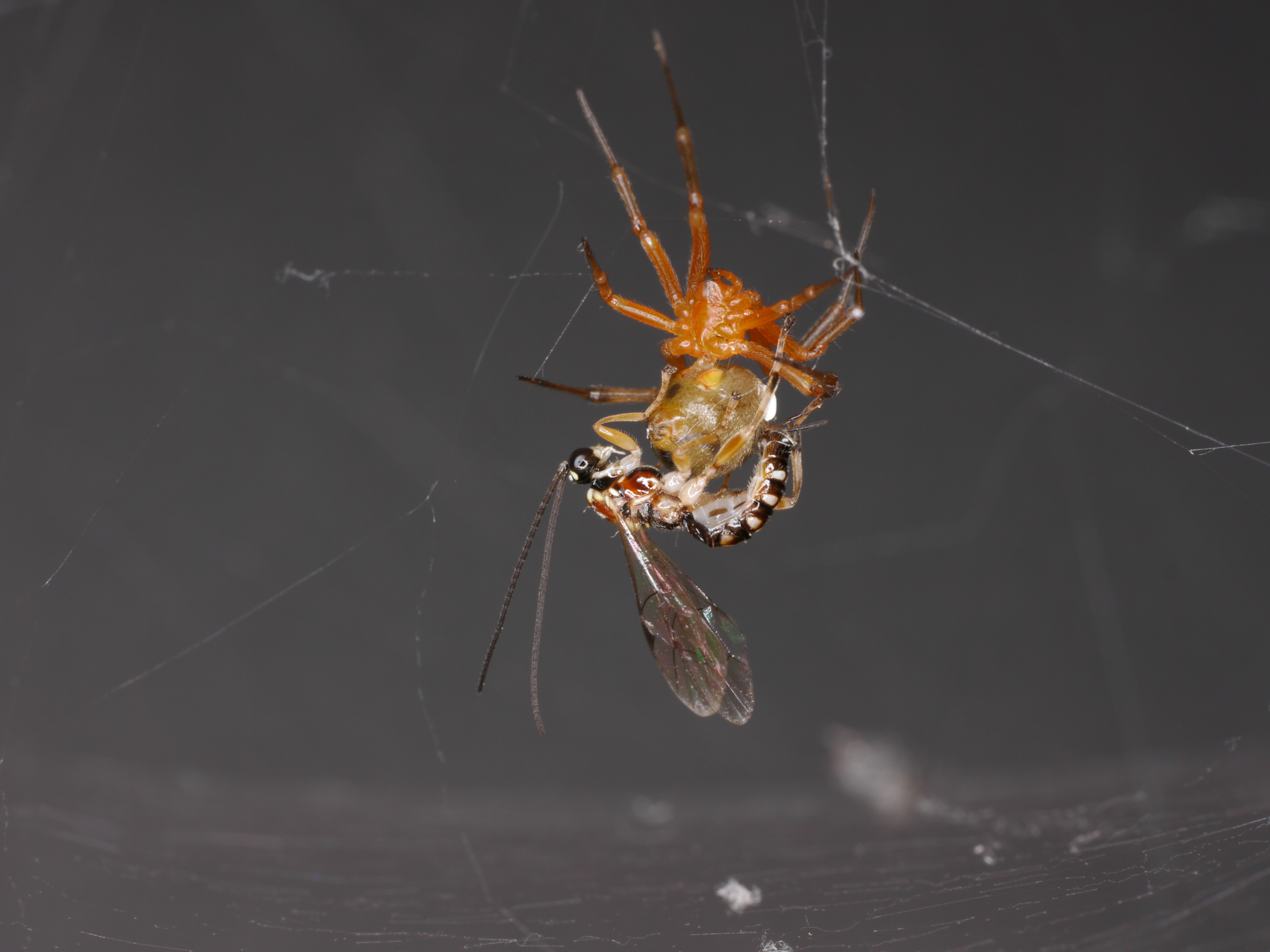
A female Z. maculata laying her egg upon the abdomen of N. japonica.
