= Aquimarina spongiicola =

Scientific classification
- Domain: Bacteria
- Kingdom: Pseudomonadati
- Phylum: Bacteroidota
- Class: Flavobacteriia
- Order: Flavobacteriales
- Family: Flavobacteriaceae
- Genus: Aquimarina
- Species: A. spongiicola

Binomial name
- Aquimarina spongiicola Choi et al. 2018

Type strain
- KACC 19274, LMG 30078

Species of bacterium

Aquimarina spongiicola is a Gram-negative, aerobic, non-spore-forming, rod-shaped and motile bacterium from the genus Aquimarina which has been isolated from spongin.
