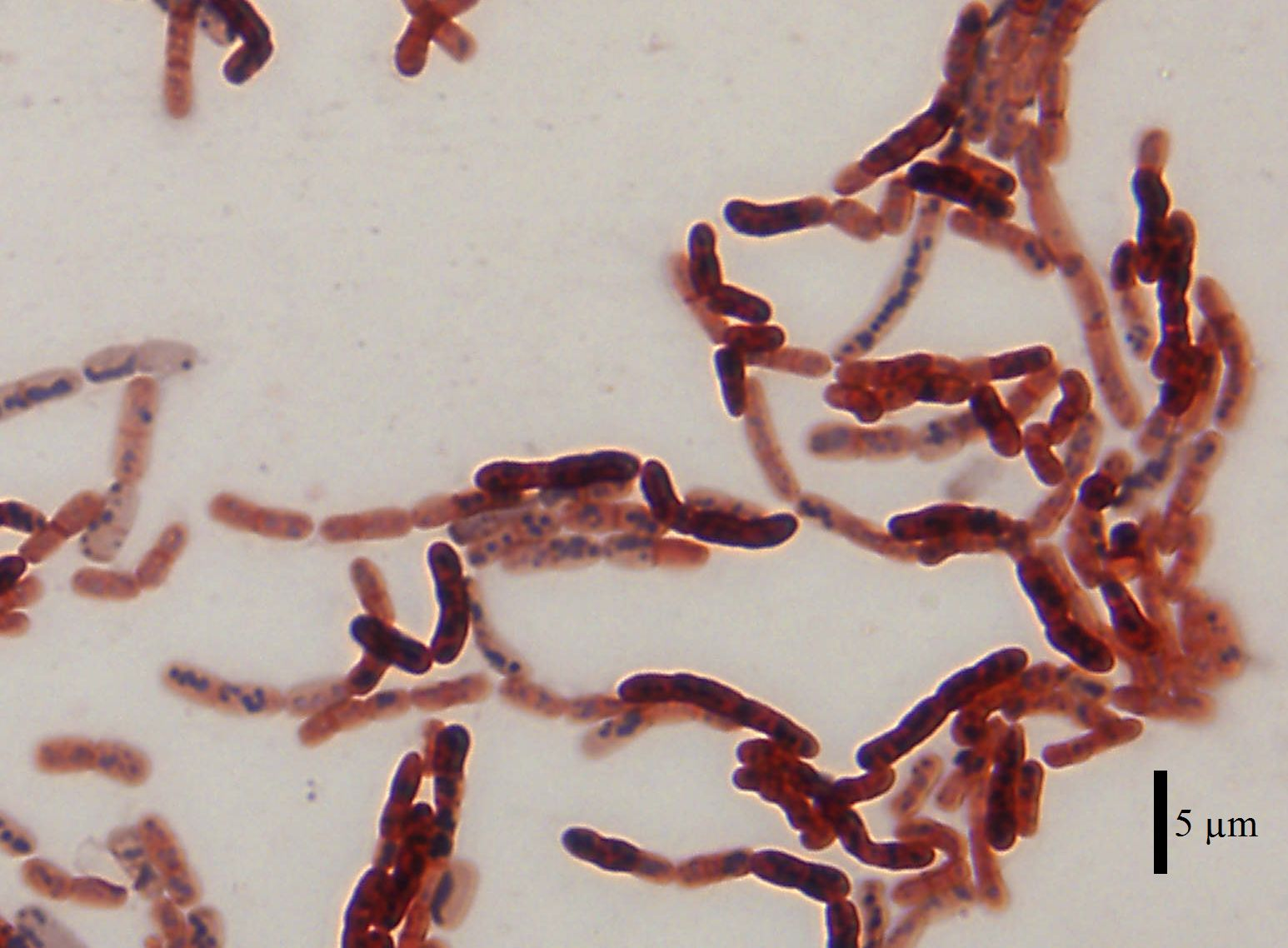
- Priestia megaterium cells stained with Sudan Black B and safranin.

Scientific classification
- Domain: Bacteria
- Kingdom: Bacillati
- Phylum: Bacillota
- Class: Bacilli
- Order: Caryophanales
- Family: Bacillaceae
- Genus: Priestia
- Species: P. megaterium

Binomial name
- Priestia megaterium (de Bary 1884) Gupta et al. 2020

= Priestia megaterium =

Species of bacterium

Priestia megaterium (Bacillus megaterium prior to 2020) is a rod-like, Gram-positive, mainly aerobic, spore forming bacterium found in widely diverse habitats. It has cells of roughly 1.5 μm by 4 μm (up to about 2.5 μm by 10 μm in some reports), which is quite large for bacteria and 100 times larger than Escherichia coli. The cells often occur in pairs and chains, where the cells are joined by polysaccharides on the cell walls.

Before the rise of Bacillus subtilis as the dominant Gram-positive model organism, P. megaterium was widely used for studies on biochemistry, sporulation, and bacteriophages. Recently, its popularity has started increasing in the field of biotechnology for its recombinant protein-production capacity.

== Characteristics ==
P. megaterium grows at temperatures from 3 to 45 °C, with the optimum around 30 °C. Some isolates from an Antarctic geothermal lake were found to grow at temperatures up to 63 °C. It has been recognized as an endophyte and is a potential agent for the biocontrol of plant diseases. Nitrogen fixation has been demonstrated in some strains of P. megaterium. It is used as a plant-growth-promoting rhizobacterium (PGPR) and biocontrol agent, which can reduce reliance on synthetic fertilizers and pesticides, and it contributes to phosphate solubilization and to microbially induced calcium carbonate precipitation (MICP), the latter being explored for applications such as self-healing concrete.

P. megaterium has been an important industrial organism for decades. It has been used to produce enzymes such as amylases used in the baking industry, glucose dehydrogenase used in glucose blood tests, enzymes for modifying corticosteroids, and several amino acid dehydrogenases. Furthermore, it is used for the production of pyruvate, vitamin B_{12}, and penicillin G acylase (penicillin amidase), an enzyme used industrially to convert penicillin G into 6-aminopenicillanic acid for the semi-synthesis of β-lactam antibiotics. Some strains additionally produce antifungal and antibacterial secondary metabolites. Several of these bioactive compounds are cyclic lipopeptides, belonging to the surfactin, iturin, and fengycin lipopeptide families, which are also produced by several other Bacillus species. P. megaterium synthesizes vitamin B_{12} (cobalamin) via an oxygen-independent (anaerobic) adenosylcobalamin biosynthetic pathway, and has served as a model system for engineering B_{12} production.

P. megaterium is known to produce poly-γ-glutamic acid. The accumulation of the polymer is greatly increased in a saline (2–10% NaCl) environment, in which the polymer comprises largely of L-glutamate (L-isomer content up to 95%). At least one strain of P. megaterium can be considered halotolerant (moderately halophilic), as growth on up to 15% NaCl has been observed.

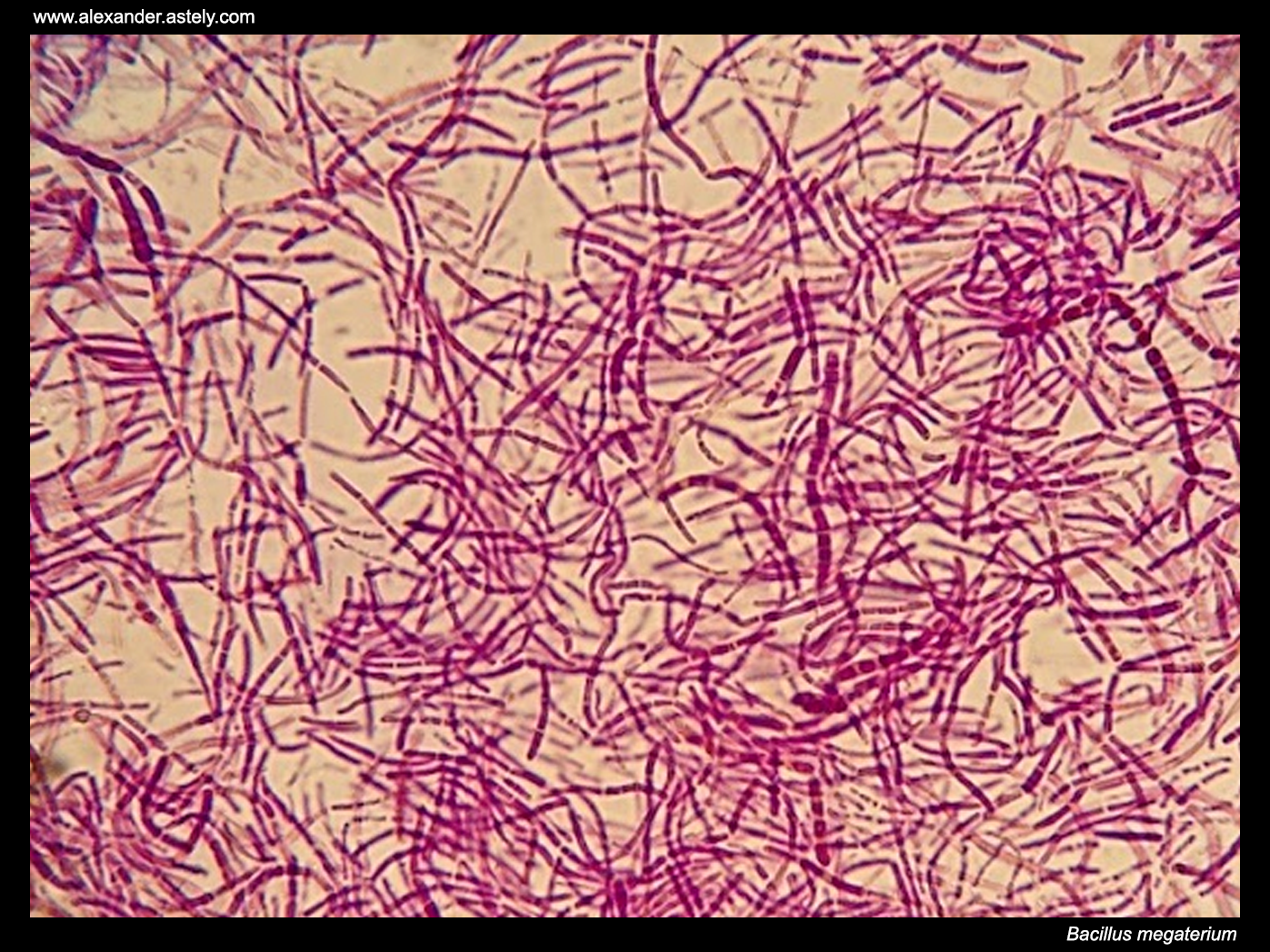
Gram-stained Priestia megaterium

=== Recombinant protein production ===
P. megaterium is an attractive Gram-positive host for recombinant protein production. Unlike Escherichia coli, it has no outer membrane and therefore does not produce lipopolysaccharide (LPS) endotoxin, it lacks major extracellular alkaline proteases that would otherwise degrade secreted products, and it maintains plasmids stably. Commercial xylose-inducible secretion vector systems are available, making the organism a well-established expression platform.

Phylogenetically, based on 16S rRNA, P. megaterium is strongly linked with Priestia flexa (formerly Bacillus flexus), the latter distinguished from P. megaterium a century ago, but only recently confirmed as a different species. P. megaterium has a genome comprising a chromosome of about 5.1 Mb (roughly 5,300 genes) with a low G+C content of around 38%; the strain QM B1551 additionally carries seven indigenous plasmids (about 417 kb, ~523 genes), one of the largest plasmid arrays sequenced in a single strain, while the plasmidless strain DSM319 is commonly used as a laboratory and expression background. This complex plasmid content is a notable feature of the species. It shares some phenotypic and phylogenetic similarities with the pathogens B. anthracis and B. cereus, although itself being relatively harmless.

== Isolation ==
P. megaterium is ubiquitous in the environment. In addition to being a common soil bacterium and an endophyte, it can be found in various foods (including honey and bee pollen, in which most microorganisms do not grow) and on a variety of surfaces, including clinical specimens, leather, paper, stone etc. It has also been isolated from cattle feces, emperor moth caterpillars, and greater wax moth frass.

== Pathogenicity ==
P. megaterium is generally regarded as a non-pathogenic environmental bacterium and is often dismissed as a contaminant when isolated from clinical specimens. However, rare cases of human infection have been reported. In one documented instance, a soft tissue infection developed in an otherwise healthy individual following traumatic injury, likely due to direct inoculation of the organism into the wound.

== Taxonomy ==
In 2020, Gupta and colleagues used phylogenomic and comparative genomic analyses to divide the genus Bacillus into 17 distinct species clades, which were proposed as separate genera. The "Megaterium clade" became the new genus Priestia, which is distinguished by two conserved signature indels (CSIs) in the oligoribonuclease NrnB. Besides P. megaterium, the genus includes the former Bacillus species now named Priestia aryabhattai, P. endophytica, P. filamentosa, P. flexa, P. koreensis, and P. abyssalis.

The closest relative of P. megaterium is Priestia aryabhattai; their 16S rRNA genes are about 99.7% identical and the average nucleotide identity between type strains lies near the species boundary, so the two cannot be reliably distinguished by 16S rRNA alone and require genome-level (ANI or dDDH) or gyrB analysis for confident identification.

The type strain is ATCC 14581 (= DSM 32 = NBRC 15308 = LMG 7127).

== History of the name ==
The species was described by de Bary in 1884, who called it Bacillus megaterium, but did not give an etymology. However, some subsequent authors called it P. megatherium assuming the name was incorrectly spelled. This trend continues as many scientists still use the name B. megatherium, sowing confusion.

The name P. megaterium is a nominative noun in apposition (see Rule 12 of the Bacteriological Code (ICNB)) and is formed from the Greek adjective mega, (μέγας , μεγάλη, μέγα) meaning "great", and a second word of unclear etymology. Three hypotheses of the epithet "megaterium" are possible:

- unintentional orthographic error (unlikely given the fact that de Bary and his students, consistently used the epithet "megaterium"), whereas it should have been megatherium, from therion (θηρίον, meaning "beast"), to mean "great beast".
- a contraction of "megabacterium" as speculated by Rippel in given the fact that de Bary called the bacterium with the nickname Grosstier or Grossvieh
- stems from teras, teratos (τέρας, τέρατος, a neuter noun meaning omen or wonder or, indirectly, monster,) which could be interpreted to mean "great monster" (with the Neolatin name being formed incorrectly given that there is no evidence of a Greek third declension noun when converted into Latin becoming a second Latin declension using the nominative stem, which is "ter-" while the other case use the stem "terat-". If were converted into a third declension noun it would have been "megateras, -atis").

Consequently, it was decided in the first juridical opinion of the Bacteriological code that the name should remain "megaterium" given the unclear meaning.

The etymology listed in LPSN is, despite being not quite correct, a fusion of the first and third interpretation Gr. adj. megas, large; Gr. n. teras -atis, monster, beast; N.L. n. megaterium, big beast.

The species name megaterium has been applied to other genera.
