= Aquimarina muelleri =

Scientific classification
- Domain: Bacteria
- Kingdom: Pseudomonadati
- Phylum: Bacteroidota
- Class: Flavobacteriia
- Order: Flavobacteriales
- Family: Flavobacteriaceae
- Genus: Aquimarina
- Species: A. muelleri

Binomial name
- Aquimarina muelleri Nedashkovskaya et al. 2005

Type strain
- DSM 19832, KCTC 12285, KMM 6020, LMG 22569

Species of bacterium

Aquimarina muelleri is a Gram-negative, strictly aerobic, heterotrophic and motile bacterium from the genus Aquimarina which has been isolated from sea-water from the Amur Bay.
