= Aquimarina sediminis =

Scientific classification
- Domain: Bacteria
- Kingdom: Pseudomonadati
- Phylum: Bacteroidota
- Class: Flavobacteriia
- Order: Flavobacteriales
- Family: Flavobacteriaceae
- Genus: Aquimarina
- Species: A. sediminis

Binomial name
- Aquimarina sediminis Wang et al. 2020

Type strain
- w01

Species of bacterium

Aquimarina sediminis is a Gram-negative, strictly aerobic, rod-shaped and motile bacterium from the genus Aquimarina which has been isolated from marine sediments.
