= Aquimarina algicola =

Scientific classification
- Domain: Bacteria
- Kingdom: Pseudomonadati
- Phylum: Bacteroidota
- Class: Flavobacteriia
- Order: Flavobacteriales
- Family: Flavobacteriaceae
- Genus: Aquimarina
- Species: A. algicola

Binomial name
- Aquimarina algicola Sun et al. 2021

Type strain
- M625

Species of bacterium

Aquimarina algicola is a bacterium from the genus Aquimarina.
