= Aquimarina hainanensis =

Scientific classification
- Domain: Bacteria
- Kingdom: Pseudomonadati
- Phylum: Bacteroidota
- Class: Flavobacteriia
- Order: Flavobacteriales
- Family: Flavobacteriaceae
- Genus: Aquimarina
- Species: A. hainanensis

Binomial name
- Aquimarina hainanensis Zheng et al. 2016

Type strain
- KCTC 42423, MCCC 1K00498, M124

Species of bacterium

Aquimarina hainanensis is a Gram-negative, non-spore-forming, long rod-shaped, and non-motile bacterium from the genus Aquimarina which has been isolated from the shrimp larvae Litopenaeus vannamei.
