= Aquimarina algiphila =

Scientific classification
- Domain: Bacteria
- Kingdom: Pseudomonadati
- Phylum: Bacteroidota
- Class: Flavobacteriia
- Order: Flavobacteriales
- Family: Flavobacteriaceae
- Genus: Aquimarina
- Species: A. algiphila

Binomial name
- Aquimarina algiphila Nedashkovskaya et al. 2018

Type strain
- 9Alg 151

Synonyms
- Aquimarina agariphyla

Species of bacterium

Aquimarina algiphila is a Gram-negative, strictly aerobic, rod-shaped and motile bacterium from the genus Aquimarina which has been isolated from the alga Tichocarpus crinitus.
