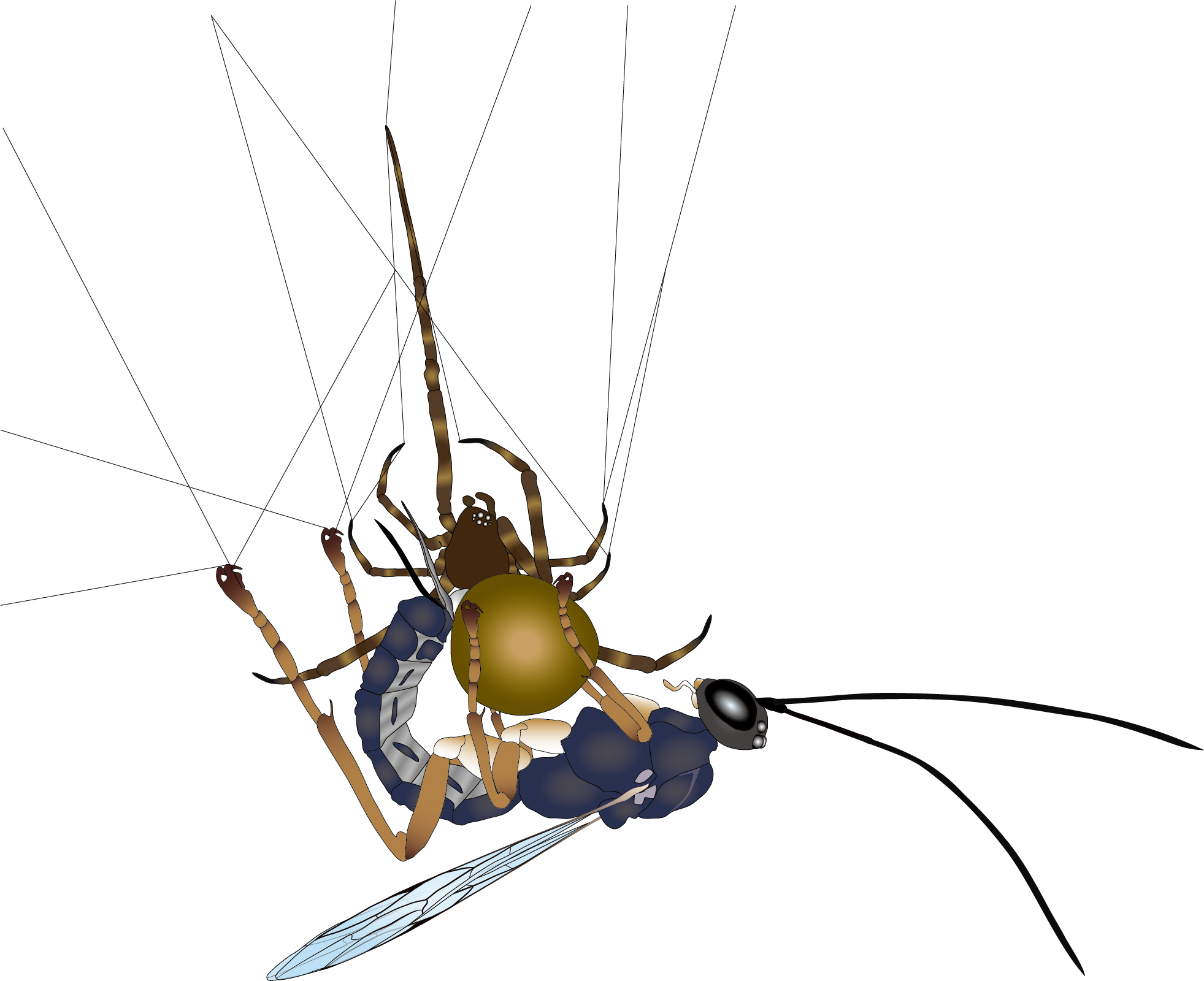
- Zatypota albicoxa

Scientific classification
- Kingdom: Animalia
- Phylum: Arthropoda
- Clade: Pancrustacea
- Class: Insecta
- Order: Hymenoptera
- Family: Ichneumonidae
- Tribe: Ephialtini
- Genus: Zatypota; Förster, 1869

= Zatypota =

Genus of wasps

Zatypota is a genus of ichneumon wasps in the family Ichneumonidae. There are at least 40 described species in Zatypota.

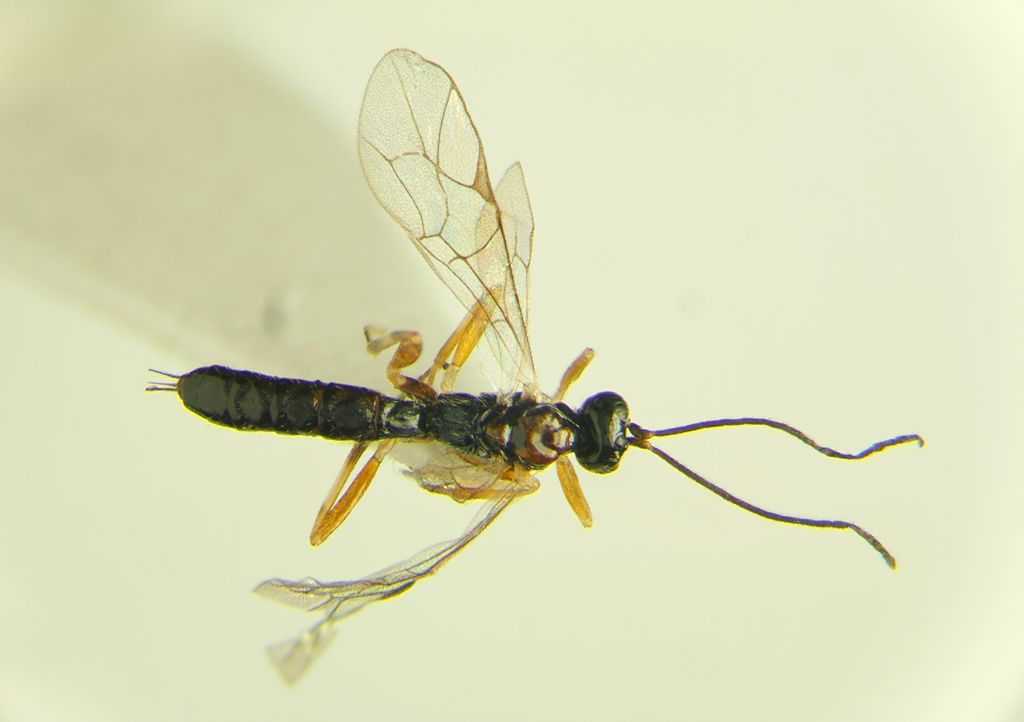
Zatypota percontatoria

== Species ==
These 49 species belong to the genus Zatypota:

- Zatypota albicoxa (Walker, 1874)^{c g}
- Zatypota alborhombarta (Davis, 1895)^{c g b}
- Zatypota anomala (Holmgren, 1860)^{c g}
- Zatypota arizonica Townes, 1960^{c g}
- Zatypota baragi Matsumoto^{g}
- Zatypota bayamensis Fernandez, 2007^{c g}
- Zatypota bingili Gauld, 1984^{c g}
- Zatypota bohemani (Holmgren, 1860)^{c g}
- Zatypota brachycera Matsumoto^{g}
- Zatypota capicola Benoit, 1959^{c g}
- Zatypota celer Gauld, 1984^{c g}
- Zatypota chryssophaga Matsumoto^{g}
- Zatypota cingulata Townes, 1960^{c g}
- Zatypota crassipes Townes, 1960^{c g}
- Zatypota dandiensis Gauld, 1984^{c g}
- Zatypota dendrobia Matsumoto^{g}
- Zatypota dichroa (Marshall, 1892)^{c g}
- Zatypota discolor (Holmgren, 1860)^{c g}
- Zatypota elegans Matsumoto^{g}
- Zatypota exilis Townes, 1960^{c g}
- Zatypota favosa Townes, 1960^{c g}
- Zatypota fonsecai Gauld, 1991^{c g}
- Zatypota gracilipes Uchida & Momoi, 1958^{c g}
- Zatypota inexpectata (Seyrig, 1932)^{c g}
- Zatypota kauros Gauld, 1984^{c g}
- Zatypota kerstinae Fritzen^{g}
- Zatypota luteipes Townes, 1960^{c g}
- Zatypota lagiralda Gauld ID, Menjívar R, Monro A, González MO (2002) Guía para la Identificación de los Pimplinae de Cafetales Bajo Sombra de El Salvador (Hymenoptera: Ichneumonidae). The Natural History Museum, London ^{g}
- Zatypota maculata Matsumoto & Takasuka^{g}
- Zatypota medranoi Gauld, 1991^{c g}
- Zatypota mongolica Sedivy, 1971^{c g}
- Zatypota morsei Gauld, 1991^{c g}
- Zatypota pallipes Schmiedeknecht, 1888^{c g}
- Zatypota patellata Townes, 1960^{c g}
- Zatypota percontatoria (Müller, 1776)^{c g}
- Zatypota petronae Gauld, 1991^{c g}
- Zatypota phraxos Gauld, 1984^{c g}
- Zatypota picticollis (Thomson, 1888)^{c g}
- Zatypota prima Benoit, 1953^{c g}
- Zatypota rennefer Gauld, 1984^{c g}
- Zatypota riverai Gauld, 1991^{c g}
- Zatypota solanoi Gauld, 1991^{c g}
- Zatypota stellata Gauld, 1984^{c g}
- Zatypota sulcata Matsumoto^{g}
- Zatypota takayu Matsumoto & Takasuka^{g}
- Zatypota talamancae Gauld, Ugalde & Hanson, 1998^{c g}
- Zatypota velata Gauld, 1984^{c g}
- Zatypota walleyi Townes, 1960^{c g}
- Zatypota yambar Matsumoto^{g}

Data sources: i = ITIS, c = Catalogue of Life, g = GBIF, b = Bugguide.net
