= Aquimarina atlantica =

Scientific classification
- Domain: Bacteria
- Kingdom: Pseudomonadati
- Phylum: Bacteroidota
- Class: Flavobacteriia
- Order: Flavobacteriales
- Family: Flavobacteriaceae
- Genus: Aquimarina
- Species: A. atlantica

Binomial name
- Aquimarina atlantica Li et al. 2015

Type strain
- 22II-S11-z7, KCTC 42003, MCCC 1A09239

Species of bacterium

Aquimarina atlantica is a Gram-negative and long-rod-shaped bacterium from the genus Aquimarina which has been isolated from seawater from the Atlantic Ocean.
