= Aquimarina versatilis =

Scientific classification
- Domain: Bacteria
- Kingdom: Pseudomonadati
- Phylum: Bacteroidota
- Class: Flavobacteriia
- Order: Flavobacteriales
- Family: Flavobacteriaceae
- Genus: Aquimarina
- Species: A. versatilis

Binomial name
- Aquimarina versatilis Lee et al. 2017

Type strain
- CBA3207, JCM 19528

Species of bacterium

Aquimarina versatilis is a Gram-negative, aerobic and rod-shaped bacterium from the genus Aquimarina which has been isolated from seashore sand from Jeju Island in Korea.
