= Aquimarina latercula =

Scientific classification
- Domain: Bacteria
- Kingdom: Pseudomonadati
- Phylum: Bacteroidota
- Class: Flavobacteriia
- Order: Flavobacteriales
- Family: Flavobacteriaceae
- Genus: Aquimarina
- Species: A. latercula

Binomial name
- Aquimarina latercula (Lewin 1969) Nedashkovskaya et al. 2006

Type strain
- ATCC 23177, CIP 104806, DSM 2041, IAM 14305, IFO 15938, JCM 8515, KCTC 2912, LMG 1343, NBRC 15938, NCIMB 1399, NCMB 1399, SIO-1

Synonyms
- Cytophaga latercula Stanierella latercula

Species of bacterium

Aquimarina latercula is a bacterium from the genus Aquimarina which has been isolated from a sea-water aquarium outflow in La Jolla in the United States.
