= Aquimarina aggregata =

Scientific classification
- Domain: Bacteria
- Kingdom: Pseudomonadati
- Phylum: Bacteroidota
- Class: Flavobacteriia
- Order: Flavobacteriales
- Family: Flavobacteriaceae
- Genus: Aquimarina
- Species: A. aggregata

Binomial name
- Aquimarina aggregata Wang et al. 2016

Type strain
- RZW4-3-2, JCM 30824, MCCC 1K00698

Species of bacterium

Aquimarina aggregata is a Gram-negative, strictly aerobic, rod-shaped and agarolytic bacterium from the genus Aquimarina which has been isolated from seawater from the Yellow Sea in China.
