= Aquimarina spongiae =

Scientific classification
- Domain: Bacteria
- Kingdom: Pseudomonadati
- Phylum: Bacteroidota
- Class: Flavobacteriia
- Order: Flavobacteriales
- Family: Flavobacteriaceae
- Genus: Aquimarina
- Species: A. spongiae

Binomial name
- Aquimarina spongiae Yoon et al. 2011

Type strain
- A6, DSM 22623, KCTC 22663

Species of bacterium

Aquimarina spongiae is a bacterium from the genus Aquimarina which has been isolated from the sponge Halichondria oshoro from the coastal area of Jeju in Korea.
