= Aquimarina rubra =

Scientific classification
- Domain: Bacteria
- Kingdom: Pseudomonadati
- Phylum: Bacteroidota
- Class: Flavobacteriia
- Order: Flavobacteriales
- Family: Flavobacteriaceae
- Genus: Aquimarina
- Species: A. rubra

Binomial name
- Aquimarina rubra Han et al. 2017

Type strain
- SS2-9, KCTC 52274, MCCC 1H00142

Species of bacterium

Aquimarina rubra is a Gram-negative, rod-shaped and non-motile bacterium from the genus Aquimarina which has been isolated from sediments from a pond which was cultivated with sea cucumbers from Rongcheng in China.
