= Aquimarina macrocephali =

Scientific classification
- Domain: Bacteria
- Kingdom: Pseudomonadati
- Phylum: Bacteroidota
- Class: Flavobacteriia
- Order: Flavobacteriales
- Family: Flavobacteriaceae
- Genus: Aquimarina
- Species: A. macrocephali

Binomial name
- Aquimarina macrocephali Miyazaki et al. 2010

Type strain
- JAMB N27, JCM 15542, NCIMB 14508

Species of bacterium

Aquimarina macrocephali is a Gram-negative, strictly aerobic and rod-shaped bacterium from the genus Aquimarina which has been isolated from sediments near a whale carcasses near Kagoshima on Japan.
