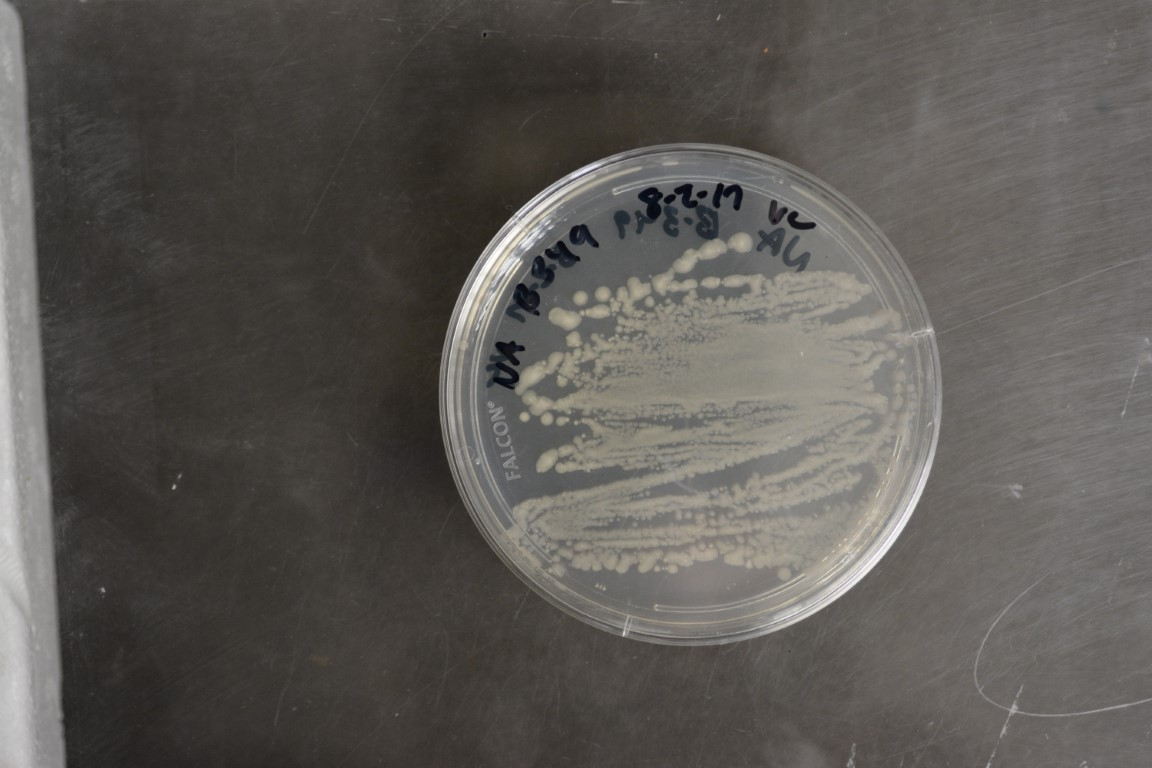
- Priestia megaterium

Scientific classification
- Domain: Bacteria
- Kingdom: Bacillati
- Phylum: Bacillota
- Class: Bacilli
- Order: Bacillales
- Family: Bacillaceae
- Genus: Priestia; Gupta et al. 2020

Type species
- Priestia megaterium (de Bary 1884) Gupta et al. 2020

Species
- See text

Synonyms
- "Flexus" Pribram 1929; "Megatherium" Pribram 1929 non Cuvier 1796; "Zopfiella" Trevisan 1885

= Priestia =

Genus of bacteria

Priestia is a genus of mostly Gram-positive (P. flexa stains Gram-variable and P. koreensis stains Gram-negative), rod-shaped bacteria in the family Bacillaceae from the order Bacillales. The type species of this genus is Priestia megaterium.

Members of Priestia are previously species belonging to Bacillus, a genus that has been recognized as displaying extensive polyphyly within its members due to the vague criteria used to assign species to this clade. Multiple studies have been conducted using comparative phylogenetic analyses as a means to clarify the evolutionary relationships between Bacillus species, resulting in the transfer of species into numerous novel genera such as Alkalihalobacillus, Brevibacillus, Solibacillus, Alicyclobacillus, Virgibacillus and Evansella. In addition, the genus Bacillus has been restricted to only include species closely related to Bacillus subtilis and Bacillus cereus.

Priestia is named after the British microbiologist Fergus G. Priest (professor, Heriot-Watt University, Edinburgh; 1948–2019) for his many contributions to the systematics and uses of the members of the genus Bacillus.

== Biochemical characteristics and molecular signatures ==
Members of this genus are aerobic and found in diverse locations, such as soil, faeces, upper atmosphere, inner tissues of cotton plants, sea sediment, and the rhizosphere of willow roots. All members can produce endospores and most are motile. Priestia species can grow in temperatures ranging from 5 to 48 °C, with optimal growth in the range of 28–37 °C, so it can be qualified as a mesophile and psychrotrophic organism. P. aryabhattai is industrially important as it is resistant to arsenic and UV radiation, allowing for an affordable alternative to conventional, expensive, metal remediation technologies.

Two conserved signature indels (CSIs) have been identified through genomic analysis as exclusive for this genus in the proteins oligoribonuclease NrnB or cAMP/cGMP phosphodiesterase and DHH superfamily protein, and can be used to reliably differentiate this genus from other Bacillaceae genera and bacteria in molecular terms.

== Phylogeny ==
Priestia, as of May 2021, contains 10 species with validly published names. This genus was identified as a monophyletic clade and phylogenetically unrelated to other Bacillus species in studies examining the taxonomic relationships within Bacillus. This branching pattern is also observed in the Genome Taxonomy Database.

Two invalidly published species, "Bacillus pseudoflexus" and "Bacillus zanthoxyli", are also found to group with other members of Priestia in phylogenetic trees, as well as share the same molecular markers in the form of CSIs. Their transfer was not officially proposed, though, due to the lack of culture strain information. Further revision of this genus is required, as additional genomes and novel species are discovered and assigned.

16S rRNA based LTP_10_2024

- - Priestia endophytica (Reva et al. 2002) Gupta et al. 2020
  - Priestia filamentosa (Sonalkar et al. 2015) Gupta et al. 2020

- - Priestia abyssalis (You et al. 2013) Gupta et al. 2020
  - - Bacillus fengqiuensis Zhao et al. 2014
    - Bacillus songklensis Kang et al. 2013

- - Priestia taiwanensis (Liu et al. 2015) Gupta et al. 2020

- Priestia
  - P. koreensis (Lim et al. 2006) Gupta et al. 2020
  - - - P. flexa (Priest, Goodfellow & Todd 1989) Gupta et al. 2020
      - P. paraflexa (Chandna, Mayilraj & Kuhad 2013) Gupta et al. 2020
    - - P. megaterium (de Bary 1884) Gupta et al. 2020
      - - P. aryabhattai (Shivaji et al. 2009) Gupta et al. 2020
        - P. qingshengii (Xi et al. 2014) Gupta et al. 2020

120 marker proteins based GTDB 09-RS220

- - Priestia taiwanensis

- Priestia
  - - P. endophytica
    - P. filamentosa
  - - - P. abyssalis
      - Bacillus fengqiuensis
    - - P. koreensis
      - - P. iocasae (Wang, Zhang & Sun 2017) Li et al. 2024
        - - P. flexa
          - - P. megaterium
            - - P. aryabhattai
              - Bacillus zanthoxyli Li et al. 2017

Unassigned species:

- "P. veravalensis" Wagh, Ram & Dastager 2021

== See also ==
- List of Bacteria genera
- List of bacterial orders
