= Aquimarina agarilytica =

Scientific classification
- Domain: Bacteria
- Kingdom: Pseudomonadati
- Phylum: Bacteroidota
- Class: Flavobacteriia
- Order: Flavobacteriales
- Family: Flavobacteriaceae
- Genus: Aquimarina
- Species: A. agarilytica

Binomial name
- Aquimarina agarilytica Lin et al. 2012

Type strain
- CCTCC AB 2010229, NBRC 107695, ZC1

Synonyms
- Shanalgae agarolytic

Species of bacterium

Aquimarina agarilytica is a Gram-negative, aerobic, and rod-shaped bacterium from the genus Aquimarina which has been isolated from the alga Porphyra haitanensis near the Nan'ao County from the China sea near China.
