= Aquimarina =

Scientific classification
- Domain: Bacteria
- Kingdom: Pseudomonadati
- Phylum: Bacteroidota
- Class: Flavobacteriia
- Order: Flavobacteriales
- Family: Flavobacteriaceae
- Genus: Aquimarina; Nedashkovskaya et al. 2005

Type species
- Aquimarina muelleri

Species
- A. addita A. agarilytica A. agarivorans A. aggregata A. algicola A. algiphila A. atlantica A. celericrescens A. gracilis A. hainanensis A. intermedia A. latercula A. longa A. macrocephali A. megaterium A. muelleri A. mytili A. pacifica A. rubra A. salinaria A. sediminis A. seongsanensis A. spongiae A. spongiicola A. versatilis

Synonyms
- Gaetbulimicrobium; Stanierella

Genus of bacteria

Aquimarina is a strictly aerobic and halophilic bacterial genus from the family of Flavobacteriaceae. Aquimarina can cause diseases in marine eukaryotes.
