= Aquimarina celericrescens =

Scientific classification
- Domain: Bacteria
- Kingdom: Pseudomonadati
- Phylum: Bacteroidota
- Class: Flavobacteriia
- Order: Flavobacteriales
- Family: Flavobacteriaceae
- Genus: Aquimarina
- Species: A. celericrescens

Binomial name
- Aquimarina celericrescens Wang et al. 2018

Type strain
- NS08, KCTC 52897, KCTC 52897

Species of bacterium

Aquimarina celericrescens is a Gram-negative, aerobic and non-spore-forming bacterium from the genus Aquimarina which has been isolated from seawater from the Xiaoshi Island from China.
