= Aquimarina addita =

Scientific classification
- Domain: Bacteria
- Kingdom: Pseudomonadati
- Phylum: Bacteroidota
- Class: Flavobacteriia
- Order: Flavobacteriales
- Family: Flavobacteriaceae
- Genus: Aquimarina
- Species: A. addita

Binomial name
- Aquimarina addita Yi and Chun 2011

Type strain
- JC2680, JCM 17106, KACC 14156

Species of bacterium

Aquimarina addita is a Gram-negative, strictly aerobic, rod-shaped and non-motile bacterium from the genus Aquimarina which has been isolated from seawater from the Jeju Island in Korea.
