= Aquimarina intermedia =

Scientific classification
- Domain: Bacteria
- Kingdom: Pseudomonadati
- Phylum: Bacteroidota
- Class: Flavobacteriia
- Order: Flavobacteriales
- Family: Flavobacteriaceae
- Genus: Aquimarina
- Species: A. intermedia

Binomial name
- Aquimarina intermedia Nedashkovskaya et al. 2006

Type strain
- DSM 17527, JCM 13506, KMM 6258, LMG 23204, R-28470

Species of bacterium

Aquimarina intermedia is a Gram-negative, heterotrophic, aerobic bacterium from the genus Aquimarina which has been isolated from the sea urchin Strongylocentrotus intermedius from the Peter the Great Gulf in Russia.
