= Aquimarina megaterium =

Scientific classification
- Domain: Bacteria
- Kingdom: Pseudomonadati
- Phylum: Bacteroidota
- Class: Flavobacteriia
- Order: Flavobacteriales
- Family: Flavobacteriaceae
- Genus: Aquimarina
- Species: A. megaterium

Binomial name
- Aquimarina megaterium Yu et al. 2014

Type strain
- CGMCC 1.12186, JCM 18215, XH134

Species of bacterium

Aquimarina megaterium is a Gram-negative, strictly aerobic and rod-shaped bacterium from the genus Aquimarina which has been isolated from seawater from the South Pacific Gyre.
