= Membrane (disambiguation) =

Membrane most commonly means a thin, selective barrier, but it is sometimes used for films that function as separators, like biological membranes. Membrane may also refer to:

Biology:

- Isolating tissues formed by layers of cells
  - Amnion, a membrane in the amniotic sac
  - Basement membrane, a thin sheet of fibers that underlies the epithelium
  - Chorioallantoic membrane, a vascular membrane found in eggs of birds, reptiles and other animals
  - Eardrum, more formally known as Tympanic membrane
  - Fetal membrane, the amnion and chorion which surround and protect a developing fetus
  - Mucous membrane, linings of mostly endodermal origin which are involved in absorption and secretion
  - Serous membrane, a smooth membrane consisting of a thin layer of cells, which secrete serous fluid
  - Tunic membrane, protective membrane covering the testes
  - Patagium, also known as "flight membrane", in some flying and gliding animals
  - Pterygium, a triangular membrane occurring in eyes
- Cell membranes:
  - Plasma membrane, a membrane that separates the interior of all cells from the outside environment
  - Inner nuclear membrane, the biological membrane of nucleus
  - Outer membrane (disambiguation), several meanings

Other uses:

- Acoustic membrane, a thin vibrating layer that produces sound
  - Membranophone, a musical instrument that uses this principle, including most drums
- Membrane keyboard, a computer keyboard whose keys are pressure pads that have only outlines and symbols printed on a flat, flexible surface
- Membrane structure, a sort of spatial structure made of tensioned membranes
- Membrane (M-Theory), a spatially extended mathematical concept that appears in string theory and related theories
- Synthetic membrane, a synthetically created membrane which is usually intended for separation purposes in laboratory or in industry
- The Membranes, a British rock band
