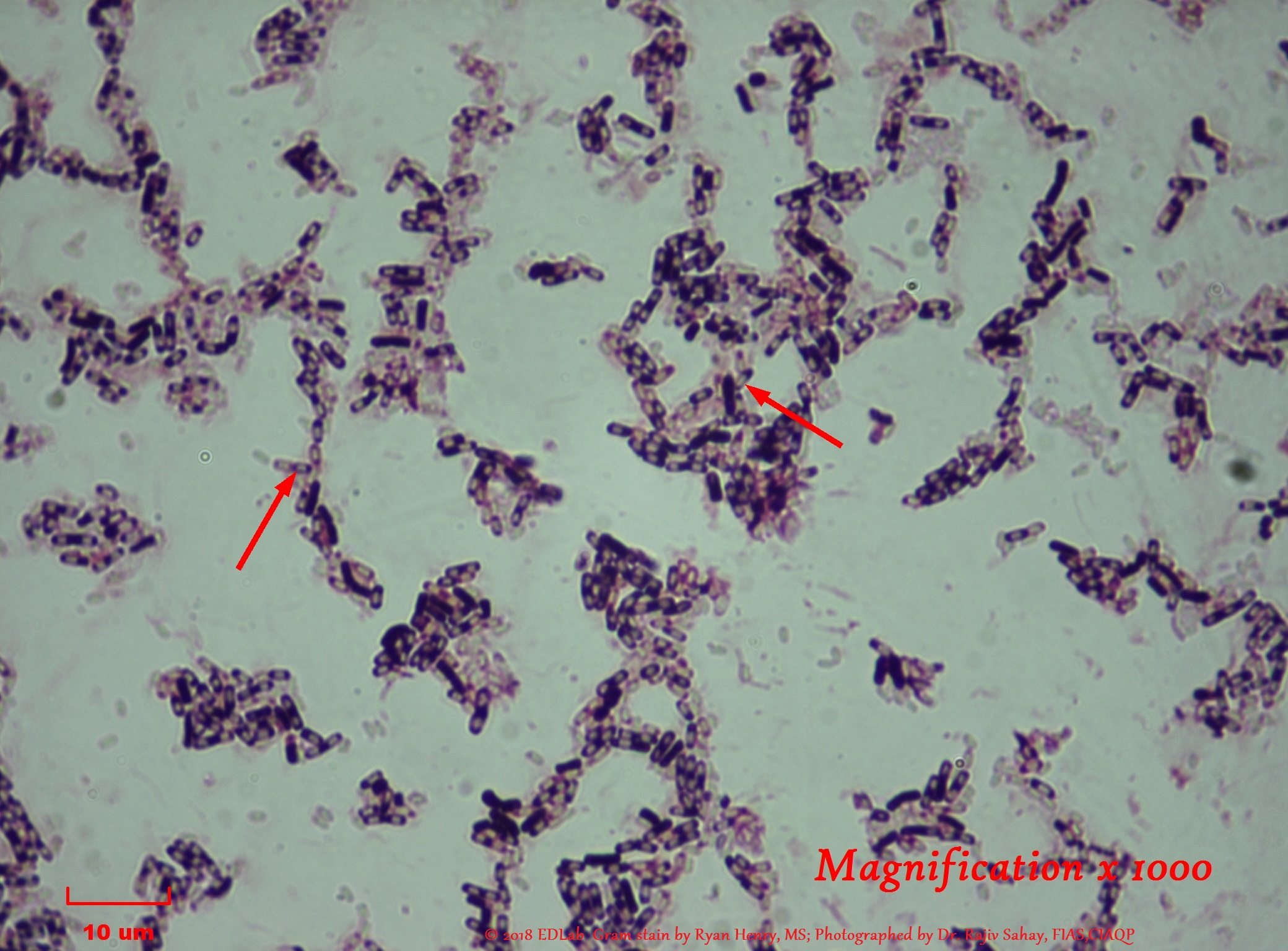
- Priestia flexa Gram stain under 1000 magnification

Scientific classification
- Domain: Bacteria
- Kingdom: Bacillati
- Phylum: Bacillota
- Class: Bacilli
- Order: Bacillales
- Family: Bacillaceae
- Genus: Priestia
- Species: P. flexa

Binomial name
- Priestia flexa (Priest et al. 1989 ex Batchelor 1919) Gupta et al. 2020

= Priestia flexa =

Species of bacterium

Priestia flexa (Bacillus flexus before 2020) is an aerobic, Gram-variable, rod-shaped, endospore-forming, oxidase-positive bacterium. The endospores are ellipsoidal, located in central/paracentral, unswollen sporangia. In laboratory conditions, it produces opaque, creamish, raised-margin colonies at 30 ± 2°C when incubated for 24–72 hrs. on tryptic soy agar. This bacterial species may be isolated from feces (poultry) and soil.

Human pathogenicity has not been well described yet.
