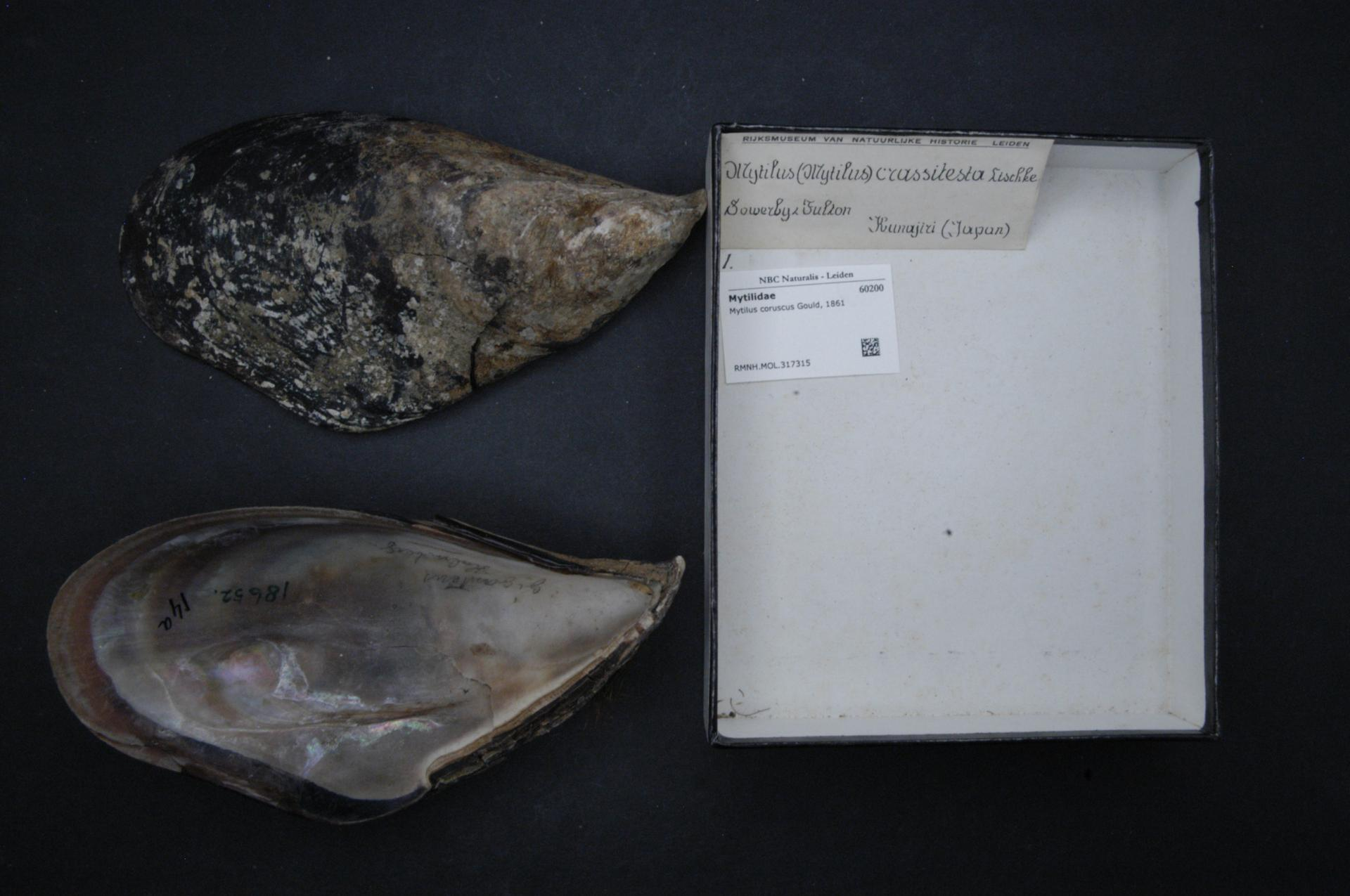

Scientific classification
- Kingdom: Animalia
- Phylum: Mollusca
- Class: Bivalvia
- Order: Mytilida
- Family: Mytilidae
- Genus: Mytilus
- Species: M. unguiculatus

Binomial name
- Mytilus unguiculatus Valenciennes, 1858

Synonyms
- Mytilus coruscus Gould, 1861; Mytilus crassitesta Lischke, 1868

= Mytilus unguiculatus =

Species of bivalve

Mytilus unguiculatus, common name the Korean mussel or the hard-shelled mussel, is a species of mussel, a marine bivalve mollusc in the family Mytilidae. This species is heavily exploited as a food item via mariculture in Korea and in China. It is also a typical macrofouling organism.

== Distribution and habitat ==
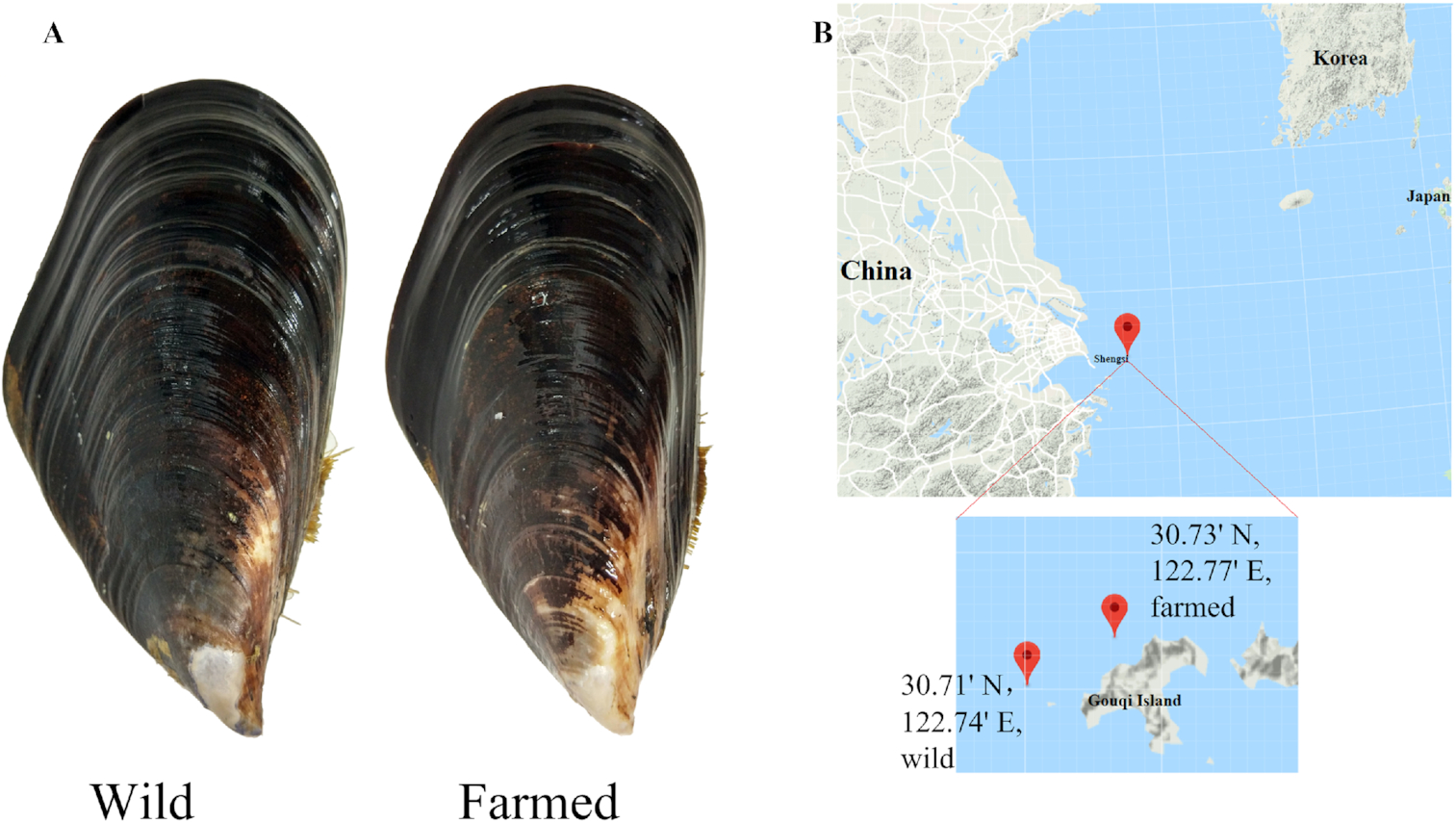

This species occurs in the coasts of the subtropical western Pacific Ocean, inhabiting temperate areas along the coastal waters of China, Japan, Korea, and the Far East of Russia. It is found in the Yellow Sea and the Sea of Japan, as far north as the Peter the Great Gulf. This mussel generally inhabits the upper part of the sublittoral zone. M. unguiculatus has also been found on debris near Vancouver Island, suspected to be from the 2011 Tōhoku tsunami.

A chromosome-level genome of the hard-shelled mussel has been sequenced, with 14 chromosomes making up a total genome length of 1.57 Gb.

== See also ==
- Perna canaliculus
