= Outer membrane =

Outer membrane may refer to:

- Bacterial outer membrane, of a gram negative bacterium cell
- Outer mitochondrial membrane
- Chloroplast outer membrane, of plant and algal cells
- Outer nuclear membrane, of the nuclear envelope in eukaryotic cells
