= South Pacific Gyre =

Major circulating system of ocean currents

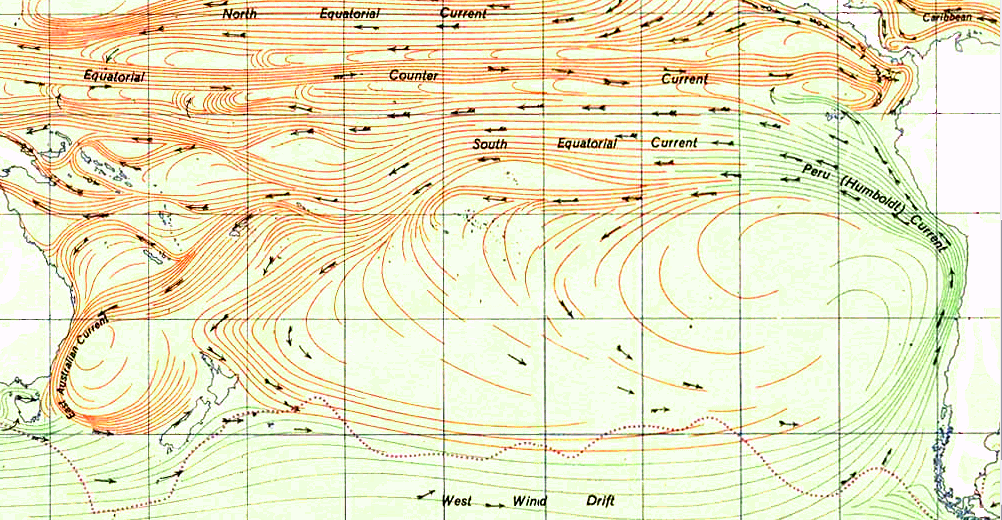
The South Pacific Gyre.

The Southern Pacific Gyre is part of the Earth's system of rotating ocean currents, bounded by the Equator to the north, Australia to the west, the Antarctic Circumpolar Current to the south, and South America to the east. The center of the South Pacific Gyre is the oceanic pole of inaccessibility, the site on Earth furthest from any continents and productive ocean regions and is regarded as Earth's largest oceanic desert. With an area of 37 million square kilometres, it makes up roughly 10% of the Earth's ocean surface. The gyre, as with Earth's other four gyres, contains an area with elevated concentrations of pelagic plastics, chemical sludge, and other debris known as the South Pacific garbage patch.

== Sediment flux and accumulation ==
Earth's trade winds and Coriolis force cause the ocean currents in South Pacific Ocean to circulate counterclockwise. The currents act to isolate the center of the gyre from nutrient upwelling, and few nutrients are transported there by the wind (eolian processes) because there is relatively little land in the Southern Hemisphere to supply dust to the prevailing winds. The low levels of nutrients in the region result in very low primary productivity in the ocean surface and subsequently extremely low flux of organic material settling to the ocean floor as marine snow. The low levels of biogenic and eolian deposition cause sediments to accumulate on the ocean floor very slowly. In the center of the South Pacific Gyre, the sedimentation rate is 0.1 to 1 m (0.3 to 3.3 ft) per million years. The sediment thickness (from basement basalts to the seafloor) ranges from 1 to 70m, with thinner sediments occurring closer to the center of the Gyre. The low flux of particles to the South Pacific Gyre causes the water there to be the clearest seawater in the world.

== Subseafloor biosphere ==
Beneath the seafloor, the marine sediments and surrounding porewaters contain an unusual subseafloor biosphere. Despite extremely low amounts of buried organic material, microbes live throughout the entire sediment column. Average cell abundances and net rates of respiration are a few orders of magnitude lower than in any other subseafloor biosphere previously studied.

The South Pacific Gyre subseafloor community is also unusual since it contains oxygen throughout the entire sediment column. In other subseafloor biospheres, microbial respiration will break down organic material and consume all the oxygen near the seafloor leaving the deeper portions of the sediment column anoxic. However, in the South Pacific Gyre, the low levels of organic material, the low rates of respiration, and the thin sediments allow the porewater to be oxygenated throughout the entire sediment column. In July 2020, marine biologists reported that aerobic microorganisms (mainly), in "quasi-suspended animation", were found in organically poor sediments, up to 101.5 million years old, 250 feet below the seafloor of the region and could be the longest-living life forms ever found.

=== Radiolytic H_{2}: a benthic energy source ===
Benthic microbes in organic-poor sediments in oligotrophic oceanic regions, such as the South Pacific Gyre, are hypothesized to metabolize radiolytic hydrogen (H_{2}) as a primary energy source.

The oceanic regions within the South Pacific Gyre (SPG), and other subtropical gyres, are characterized by low primary productivity in the surface ocean; i.e. they are oligotrophic. The center of the SPG is the furthest oceanic province from a continent and contains the clearest ocean water on Earth with ≥ 0.14 mg chlorophyll per m^{3}. Carbon exported to the underlying deep ocean sediments via the biological pump is limited in the SPG, resulting in sedimentation rates that are orders of magnitude lower than in productive zones, e.g. continental margins.

Deep-ocean benthic microbial life typically utilizes the organic carbon exported from surface waters. In oligotrophic regions where sediments are poor in organic material, subsurface benthic life exploits other primary energy sources, such as molecular hydrogen (H_{2}).

==== Radiolysis of interstitial water ====
Radioactive decay of naturally occurring uranium (^{238}U and ^{235}U), thorium (^{232}Th), and potassium (^{40}K) in seafloor sediments collectively bombard the interstitial water with α, β, and γ radiation. The irradiation ionizes and breaks apart water molecules, eventually yielding H_{2}. The products of this reaction are aqueous electrons (e^{−}_{aq}), hydrogen radicals (H·), protons (H^{+}), and hydroxyl radicals (OH·). The radicals are highly reactive, therefore short-lived, and recombine to produce hydrogen peroxide (H_{2}O_{2}), and molecular hydrogen (H_{2}).

The amount of radiolytic H_{2} production in seafloor sediments is dependent on the quantities of radioactive isotopes present, sediment porosity, and grain size. These criteria indicate that certain sediment types, such as abyssal clays and siliceous oozes, may have higher radiolytic H_{2} production relative to other seafloor strata. Also, radiolytic H_{2} production has been measured in seawater intrusions into subseafloor basement basalts.

==== Microbial activity ====
The microbes best suited to utilize radiolytic H_{2} are the knallgas bacteria, lithoautotrophes, that obtain energy by oxidizing molecular hydrogen via the knallgas reaction:

H_{2} (aq) + 0.5O_{2} (aq) H_{2}O (l)

In the surface layer of sediment cores from oligotrophic regions of the SPG, O_{2} is the primary electron acceptor used in microbial metabolisms. The O_{2} concentrations decline slightly in surface sediment (initial few decimeters) and are unchanged to depth. Meanwhile, nitrate concentrations slightly increase downward or remain constant in sediment column at approximately the same concentrations as the deep water above the seafloor. Measured negative fluxes of O_{2} in the surface layer demonstrate that a relatively low abundance of aerobic microbes which are oxidizing the minimally deposited organic matter from the ocean above. Extremely low cell counts corroborate that microbes exist in small quantities in these surface sediments. In contrast, a sediment cores outside of the SPG show rapid elimination of O_{2} and nitrate at 1 meter below sea floor (mbsf) and 2.5 mbsf, respectively. This is evidence of much higher microbial activity, both aerobic and anaerobic.

The production of radiolytic H_{2} (electron donor) is stoichiometrically balanced by the production of 0.5 O_{2} (electron acceptor), therefore a measurable flux in O_{2} is not expected in the substrate if both radiolysis of water and knallgas bacteria co-occur. Despite the known occurrence of radiolytic H_{2} production, molecular hydrogen is below the detectable limit in the SPG cores, leading to the hypothesis that H_{2} is the primary energy source in low-organic seafloor sediments below the surface layer.

== Water color ==
Satellite data images show that some areas in the gyre are greener than the surrounding clear blue water, which is frequently interpreted as areas with higher concentrations of living phytoplankton. However, the assumption that greener ocean water contains more phytoplankton is not always true. Even though the South Pacific Gyre contains these patches of green water, it has very little organism growth. Instead, some studies hypothesize that the green patches are a result of the accumulated waste of marine life. The optical properties of the South Pacific Gyre remain largely unexplored.

== Garbage patch ==
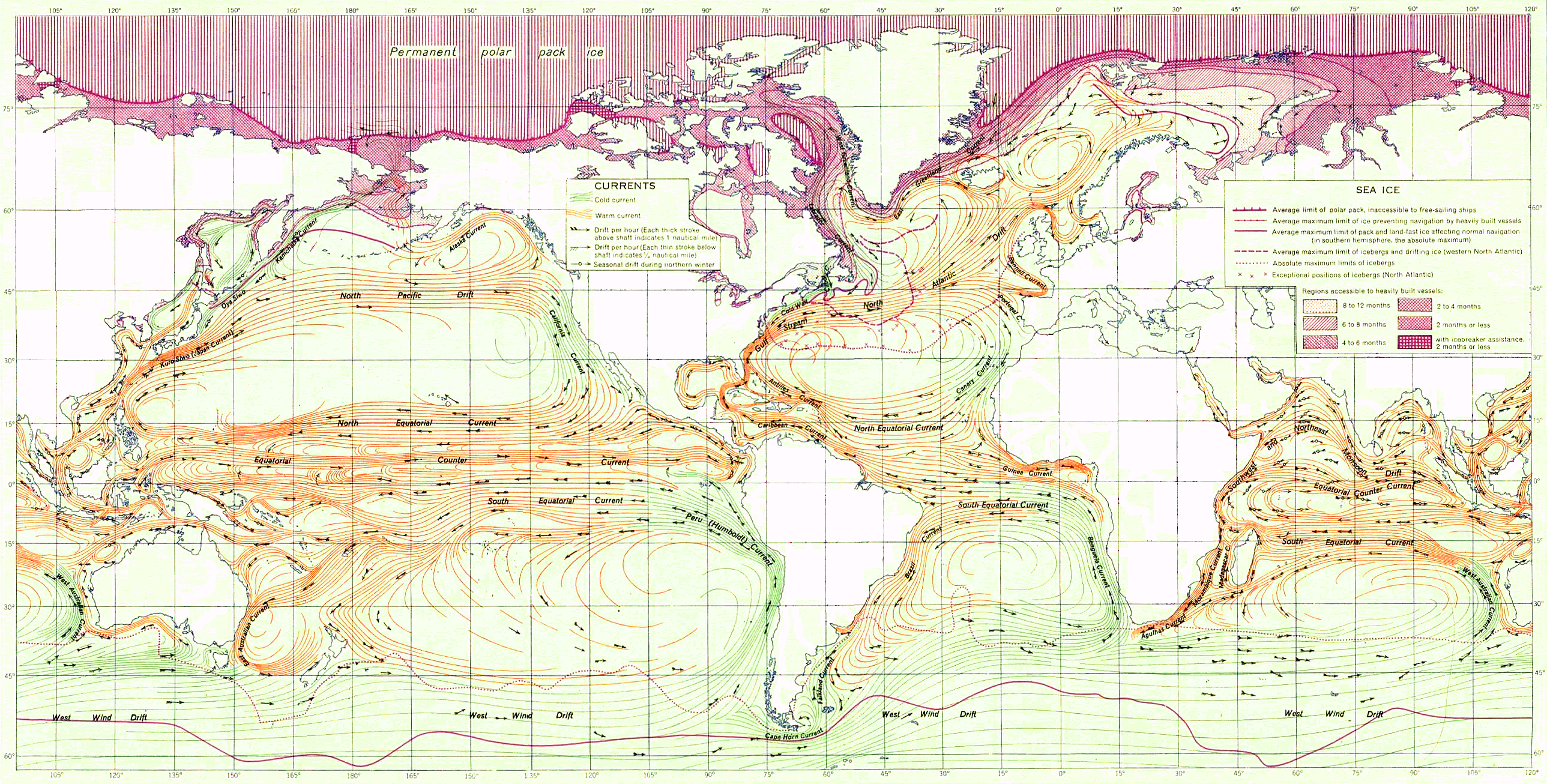
The South Pacific Gyre can be seen in the lack of oceanic currents off the west coast of South America. Map of ocean currents circa 1943

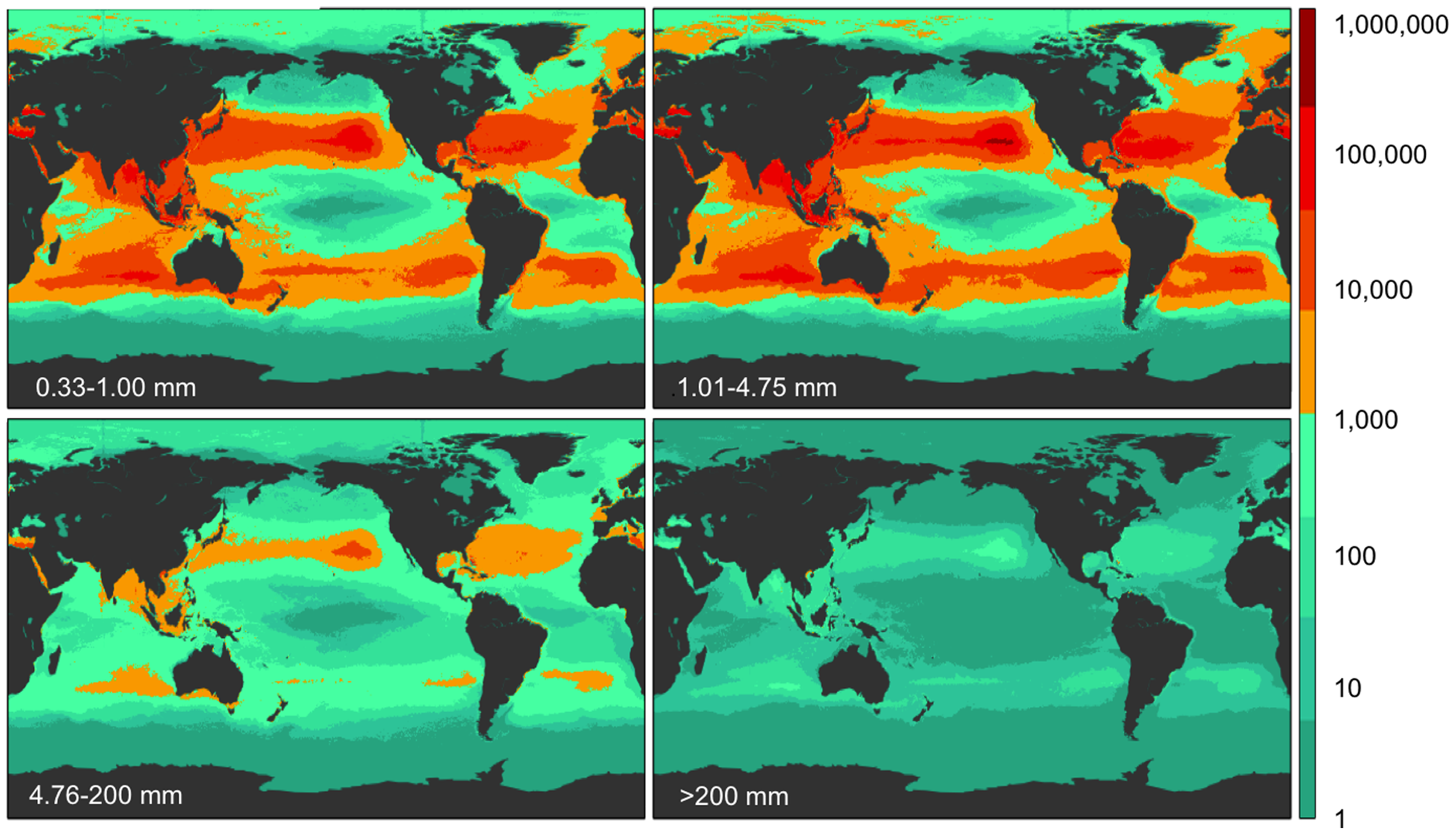
This photo demonstrates the dispersal of plastic fragments of various sizes

Visualization of the flow pattern of ocean pollutants

The South Pacific garbage patch is an area of ocean with increased levels of marine debris and plastic particle pollution, within the ocean's pelagic zone. This area is in the South Pacific Gyre, which itself spans from waters east of Australia to the South American continent, as far north as the Equator, and south until reaching the Antarctic Circumpolar Current. The degradation of plastics in the ocean also leads to a rise in the level of toxics in the area. The garbage patch was confirmed in mid-2017, and has been compared to the Great Pacific Garbage Patch's state in 2007, making the former ten years younger. The South Pacific garbage patch is not visible on satellites, and is not a landmass. Most particles are smaller than a grain of rice. A researcher said: "This cloud of microplastics extends both vertically and horizontally. It's more like smog than a patch".
