= List of seamounts in the Marshall Islands =

Bathymetric map of Micronesia-Marshall Islands, with seamounts

The Marshall Islands are the site of a number of seamounts. These volcanoes form several groups, including the Ralik Chain, the Ratak Chain and some seamounts around Anewetak. These seamounts are in turn part of a larger province that extends from the South Pacific to the Mariana Trench and is characterized by unusually shallow ocean ground.

These seamounts and volcanoes do not have simple hotspot-like age progressions, with some volcanoes being younger than one would expect from age progression and having more than one active episode. In some places, a middle Cretaceous and a late Cretaceous episode of volcanic activity have been determined by radiometric dating. Despite this, some hotspot-based genesis models have been formulated, often implying that French Polynesian hotspots are responsible for the formation of seamounts, with the Society hotspot, Rurutu hotspot, Rarotonga hotspot and the Macdonald hotspot being candidate hotspots responsible for the development of the Marshall Islands seamounts. Such linkages are in part supported by geochemical data. Some discrepancies between the age and position of such seamounts and the predictions of the hotspot model may reflect the activity of short-lived hotspots linked to large mantle plumes that produce more than one hotspot.

Name	Other names	Etymology	Coordinates	Depth below sea level	Age	Volume	Details
Aean̄-Kaņ	Marovoiy	A taboo fishing spot at Eniwetok	14°52.98′N 160°27.38′E	850 metres (2,790 ft)	Mid-Cretaceous	10,389 cubic kilometres (2,492 cu mi).	Since the Eocene manganese nodules developed on the seamount, which may have been created by the Macdonald hotspot.
Neen-Koiaak		According to legend, the fastest runner in the Marshall Islands	14°22.62′N 161°01.16′E	1,025 metres (3,363 ft)	102 million years	7,083 cubic kilometres (1,699 cu mi)	Samples dredged from Neen-Koiaak include hawaiite containing clinopyroxene, olivine and plagioclase.
Wōd-Eņ Rok	South-Wod-En	A coral head	15°13.20′N 163°00.00′E		76 million years		While its position makes it a candidate member of the Ralik hotspot trail, it appears to be too old. There is some geochemical similarity to the Rurutu hotspot.
Wōd-Eņ Iōn̄	North-Wod-En, Nazimova	A coral head	16°06.00′N 163°02.40′E		86 million years		While its position makes it a candidate member of the Ralik hotspot trail, it appears to be too old. There is some geochemical similarity to the Rurutu hotspot.
Ļewa		A person who received canoe building knowledge, one of the first two	14°01.80′N 163°07.80′E		100 million years		Part of the Ralik Chain, Albian-age fossils have been dredged from this seamount.
Ļōbbadede	Lobhadode	A chief from Bikini	13°52.80′N 163°51.60′E		94 million years		Depending on the plate reconstruction model chosen, Lobbadede appears to coincide with the location of the Macdonald hotspot. Limestone and fossils of Campanian-Cenomanian age have been found on Lobbadede, which appears to have had a second volcanic episode in the Cretaceous.
Wōden-Kōpakut	Ratak	A coral head	13°56.40′N 167°28.80′E	1,320 metres (4,330 ft)	85 million years or 82.2 ± 1.6 million years		Part of the Ratak Chain with Limalok, it was also active during the late Cretaceous and has a well developed summit platform. One reconstruction of plate motion places Woden-Kopakut close to the Rurutu hotspot. Hawaiite has been dredged from the seamount and contains iron oxides, plagioclase and zeolites.
Radik		A chief on Ujlan					
Ļainjin		A legendary navigator	11°09.00′N 161°03.00′E				
Ļōjemeja		A chief in Ujlan	11°26.40′N 161°05.40′E	1,750 metres (5,740 ft)			Steep upper flanks, and a volcanic pinnacle is found between the summit and a sediment-covered terrace.
Ļami		According to legend an Eniwetok giant	11°54.60′N 161°24.60′E	1,295 metres (4,249 ft)	86 million years		Slumps and terraces, terraces that appear to be congruent with these on Lomilik, surround this seamount. Its summit plateau is covered by sediments, sediment-filled basins and volcanic knolls.
Peto-Eņ		A taboo channel at Eniwetok	12°22.80′N 161°19.20′E				
Lomilik		A place at Eniwetok with good fishing opportunities	11°42′N 161°37′E				The summit has volcanic knobs and sediment-filled basins in between. The north flank has a terrace and the rest of the slopes is covered with slumps, talus and sediments.
Litōrmālu		A legendary navigator	10°53.40′N 161°27.60′E				
Ļo-Wūliej		A cape at Eniwetok	12°09.60′N 162°15.60′E				
North Ļāānṃōjānjān		Reference to shipbuilding techniques	13°07.80′N 162°47.20′E	1,090 metres (3,580 ft)			Has a rugged appearance with little sediment. It also features several terraces and two large slumps.
South Ļāānṃōjānjān		Reference to shipbuilding techniques	12°41.56′N 162°37.17′E	1,395 metres (4,577 ft)		1,611 cubic kilometres (386 cu mi)	Has a rugged appearance with little sediment.
Bwewa Kaņ		Named after canoe keels	13°33.60′N 164°25.20′E		88 million years		Part of the Ralik Chain, may have been formed by a hotspot together with a stage of Wodejebato.
Lōjabōn-Bar		A strong traditional personage at Bikini	13°09.00′N 164°30.00′E				
Wōdejebato	Sylvania	Bikini's most feared sea god	11°55.95′N 164°51.72′E	1,290 metres (4,230 ft)	82 million years	12,476 cubic kilometres (2,993 cu mi)	
Look			12°12.00′N 166°13.80′E	999 metres (3,278 ft)	140 million years Look is the oldest known seamount.		Flat-topped seamount that can be considered a guyot and is located between the Ratak Chain and the Ralik Chain, and fairly old. Its geochemistry is intermediate between these two chains as well, which may indicate that volcanism was strongly influenced by the crust. Look Seamount is dotted by volcanic cones and has a rilled appearance as well as slumps; the summit is covered by sediment that mostly buries small volcanic pinnacles and sediment-filled depressions.
Ruwitūn̄tūn̄			11°49.80′N 167°00.00′E	1,215 metres (3,986 ft)	66 million years		Flat-topped seamount that can be considered a guyot; basins and volcanic knolls dot its summit platform and some pinnacles contain craters. Fossils indicate that Ruwituntun developed either during or before the Albian.
Ļāwūn-Pikaar	Bikar	Legendary chief in Pikaar	12°09.60′N 168°51.60′E				Ankaramite-like rock containing clinopyroxene and degradation products of olivine and mellilite has been dredged
Ļōkōto-N̄ōrn̄ōr			13°06.00′N 169°26.40′E				
Jebo			11°03.00′N 170°39.60′E				
Pali		Name given by the government of Micronesia.			Probably Cretaceous		The seamount is surrounded by a sediment cover and might feature slumps. Hyaloclastite and phosphorite have been dredged from it.
Likelep		A site on Ujlan	10°36.00′N 160°28.80′E	1,545 metres (5,069 ft)	82 million years		Biotite, hornblende and plagioclase have been dredged from Likelep, and the seamount is of Campanian age. Likelep may be part of a seamount trail and is part of the Ujlān volcanic complex. A sediment cap and volcanic structures are found on its top, with a volcanic cone protruding through the sediment. Slumps occur on its flanks and a seamount farther north is connected to Likelep.
Lalibjet		A sea god	10°08.40′N 159°55.20′E	1,439 metres (4,721 ft)	74 million years		May have been produced by the Rarotonga hotspot together with Eniwetok and is part of the Ujlān volcanic complex. Part of the sediment cap on its summit appears to have been removed by a slump.
Ujlān	Ujelang		9°46.80′N 160°25.20′E	1,250 metres (4,100 ft)	80 million years		Seamount with three separate summits. Ujlan may be part of a seamount trail and is part of the Ujlān volcanic complex. The southwestern flank has a terrace.
Ļōtab		A descendant of Litōrmālu	10°13.80′N 160°43.20′E	1,557 metres (5,108 ft)	80 million years		Lotab may be part of a seamount trail and is part of the Ujlān volcanic complex; it also features traces of mass failures and on the northeastern flank it is connected to another seamount.
Ļajutōkwa		A navigator	10°28.80′N 160°46.80′E	1,585 metres (5,200 ft)	81 million years		Lajutokwa may be part of a seamount trail and is part of the Ujlān volcanic complex.
Lo-En	Hess	Named after the hibiscus tree	10°06.00′N 162°52.20′E		113 million years		
Mij-Lep		A gap between islands on Ujlan	8°48.60′N 163°12.60′E	1,105 metres (3,625 ft)	106 million years		A number of pinnacles, including a flat topped one on the summit, cover Mij-Lep.
Ļemkein			9°18′N 166°05′E				
Ļewōnjoui			10°32.31′N 166°27.83′E	2,985 metres (9,793 ft)		1,441 cubic kilometres (346 cu mi)	
Ļōkkwōrkwōr	Erikub		9°09.00′N 170°00.00′E	1,400 metres (4,600 ft)	87 million years		Alkali basalts and hawaiite have been dredged, which contain clinopyroxene, olivine derivatives and plagioclase and show evidence of having been eroded above the water surface
Litakpooki			8°18.60′N 160°38.40′E				
Ṃaanjidep		A chief from Jalwoj	6°43.80′N 169°19.80′E	2,215 metres (7,267 ft)			The depth probably does not refer to the actual summit.
Ļoṃjenaelik		A chief from Arno					
Ļōmōļkā		A chief from Mile	6°37.80′N 172°21.60′E				
Limalok	Harrie	A chiefess from Mile	5°36.00′N 172°21.60′E		68 million years		

== See also ==
- MIT Guyot
- Ioah Guyot
