= Geology of the Cook Islands =

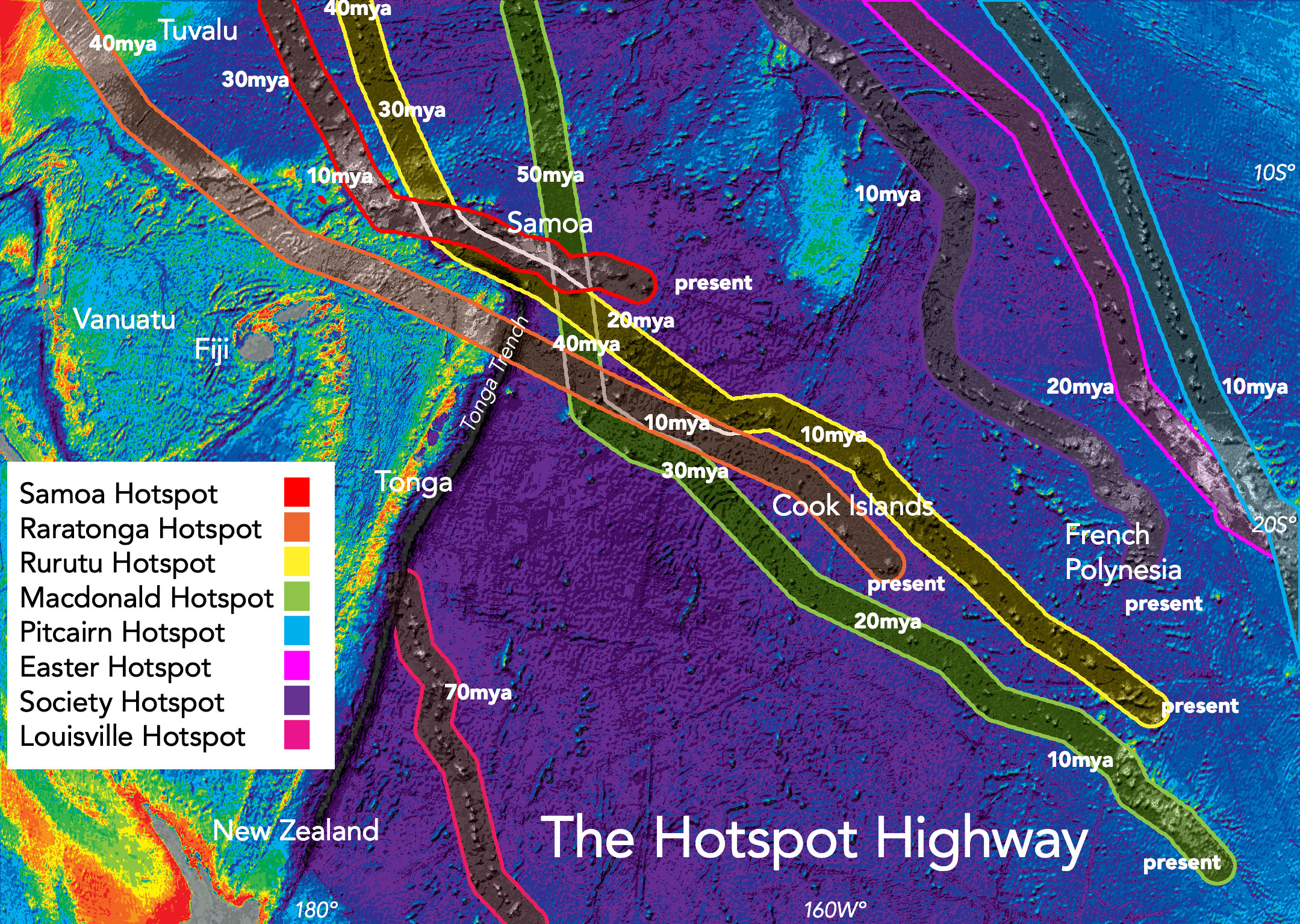
The hotspot highway intersects in the area of the Cook Islands. The tracks shown in this map are no longer fully accurate due to further definition. The Rarotonga track has indifferent evidence.

There are fifteen Cook Islands, all being related to extinct volcanoes that have erupted in the volcanic hotspot highway of the south-central Pacific Ocean. Low islands include six of the more northern islands that are atolls, and four of the more southern being uplifted coral islands. Rarotonga, the largest island of the group is a mountainous volcanic island. Rock formations include late Pliocene to more recent volcanics, Oligocene and Miocene reefs and middle Tertiary limestone underlying atolls More recent emergence of the coral reefs is characterised in several cases consistent with sealevel fall at Mangaia, of at least 1.7 m (5 ft 7 in) in the last 3400 years. The northern Suwarrow Atoll rim has portions of reef dated to between 4680 and 4310 years B.P. and at the northeast of the atoll the three ridges are dated from the land out at 4220 years B.P., 3420 years B.P. and from 1250 years B.P. On Mitiaro the centre of the reef flat has regions dated 5140–3620 years B.P.

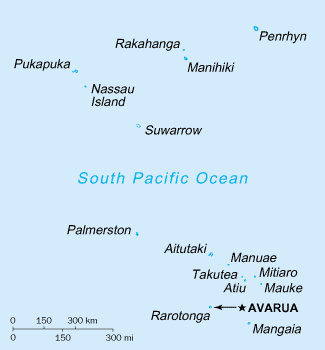
Map of the Cook Islands

== Rarotonga ==
While not all the islands have firm dates for technical reasons after modern composition and redating studies more is understood. Rarotonga erupted between 1·697 to 1·157 million years ago and so can not be assigned to say the Macdonald hotspot which went through this area 20 million years ago and explains Mangaia nearby. If its formation started with that hotspot it would be an example of rejuvenated volcanism rather than its conventional attribution to the Rarotonga hotspot which is not definite. The main above sea rock type are basalts, mostly olivine basalt but phonolite and trachyte eruptives are found to the south-east of the island and on the lagoon islet of Taa Koka. Phonolite eruptives are also common around the central caldera. There are coastal sedimentary gravels and sands as well as coral deposits. A raised coral deposit 6 ft (1.8 m) near the airfield has been dated at 43,000 years ago.

== Mangaia ==
The 18 million year old basaltic volcanics have been subjected to extensive study as it is the type for a recycled basaltic magma reservoir believed to have elements over 500 million years old that is known as HIMU (high μ = ^{238}U/^{204}Pb) mantle reservoir.

== Aitutaki ==
Aitutaki, which erupted most recently on the carbonate platform of a near-atoll has now been characterised as an example of rejuvenated volcanism with ages from ages from 1.941 to 1·382 million years ago rather than the conventional assignment to the so-called Rarotonga hotspot. However its base volcano was a hot spot volcano that erupted 9·39 million years ago in expected time sequence in the Arago hotspot series of volcanoes. Aitutaki, a high island, has been described as a near-atoll, with 85% of the area within the reef as a lagoon, with in its centre island composed primarily of volcanic rocks, as well as the two smaller volcanic islands of Moturakau and Rapota, and some smaller carol sand islands.

== Arago hotspot islands ==
The Arago hotspot which has a northern track through the Cook Islands area is the younger, in this area of the Pacific, of the two definite volcanic hot spots that contributed to the formation of most of the southern Cook Islands. The Arago hotspot Cook Islands are:

1. Palmerston
2. Aitutaki (9·39 Ma)
3. Atiu (7.44 to 7·20 Ma)
4. Manaue
5. Takutea
6. Atiu
7. Mitiaro
8. Mauke

== Northern Island Group ==
These are the islands of Manihiki, Nassau, Penrhyn atoll, Pukapuka, Rakahanga and Suwarrow and likely have limestone caps to their large, old volcanoes erupting from the early Tertiary that are now coral atolls. The largest volcano is Penrhyn rising 16,000 ft (4,900 m) from the sea floor.

== See also ==
1. Cook Islands
2. Geography of the Cook Islands
3. Geology of the Pacific Ocean
