= South Pacific superswell =

Geological region of exceptional tectonic uplift

- Superswell
- Approximate seafloor height abnormality modelled for South Pacific superswell Legend: Key for the depth anomaly: 0 meters or more; 250 meters or more; 500 meters or more
- Coordinates: 10°S 142°W
- Age: 130–0 Ma

The South Pacific superswell is a region of anomalously high seafloor topography several thousand kilometers in extent, resulting in a shallow ocean region as a byproduct. There are many volcanoes associated with it, often as chains of midplate volcanoes and seamounts. It is believed to be related to a superplume which is a large upwelling of mantle material from the core–mantle boundary.

== Geography ==
The seafloor area of the superswell extends in northern and southern branches under French Polynesia between latitudes 10°N and 30°S and longitudes 130°W and 160°W and the seafloor change has a maximum height of 680 m (2,230 ft).

== Geology ==
The term superswell was first used to describe this area of several geophysical abnormalities in 1987. These are:

1. Volcanoes
  - The rate of volcanism is 3 to 4 times greater than other comparable oceanic crust.
  - Active volcanoes include the Mehetiʻa island stratovolcano, the Adams, Arago, Macdonald, and Teahitiʻa seamounts.
  - The age progression in the volcanic chains is often short with orientations not systematically related to the motion of the Pacific plate.
2. In the area the mantle has slow seismic velocities.
3. A positive ocean depth anomaly for the age of the crust has been characterised.
4. A negative geoid anomaly.

The predominant oceanic crust in region of the superswell is aged between about 20 to 60 million years old, with a range between the present to 130 million years ago.

== Tectonics ==
The current best fit model for the dynamics of the South Pacific superplume requires a low viscosity asthenosphere, and a lower mantle a hundred times more viscous than the upper mantle. Individual mantle plumes have been characterised above the superplume which extends from the bottom of the mantle to a depth of 1,000 km (620 mi).

From seismic P wave data the superplume has been modelled in 3 dimensions, and its relationship in terms of the smaller and nearer to the surface mantle plumes that give rise to the current Arago, Macdonald, Marquesas, Rarotonga, Pitcairn, and Society hotspots has been explored. The Society, Arago, Macdonald, and Pitcairn hotspots are linked to the top of the superplume at 400–500 km (250–310 mi) depth and the Rarotonga hotspot at 1,000 km (620 mi), however there is no anomaly underneath the Marquesas hot spot in the upper mantle and the mantle transition zone.
