= Hotspot highway =

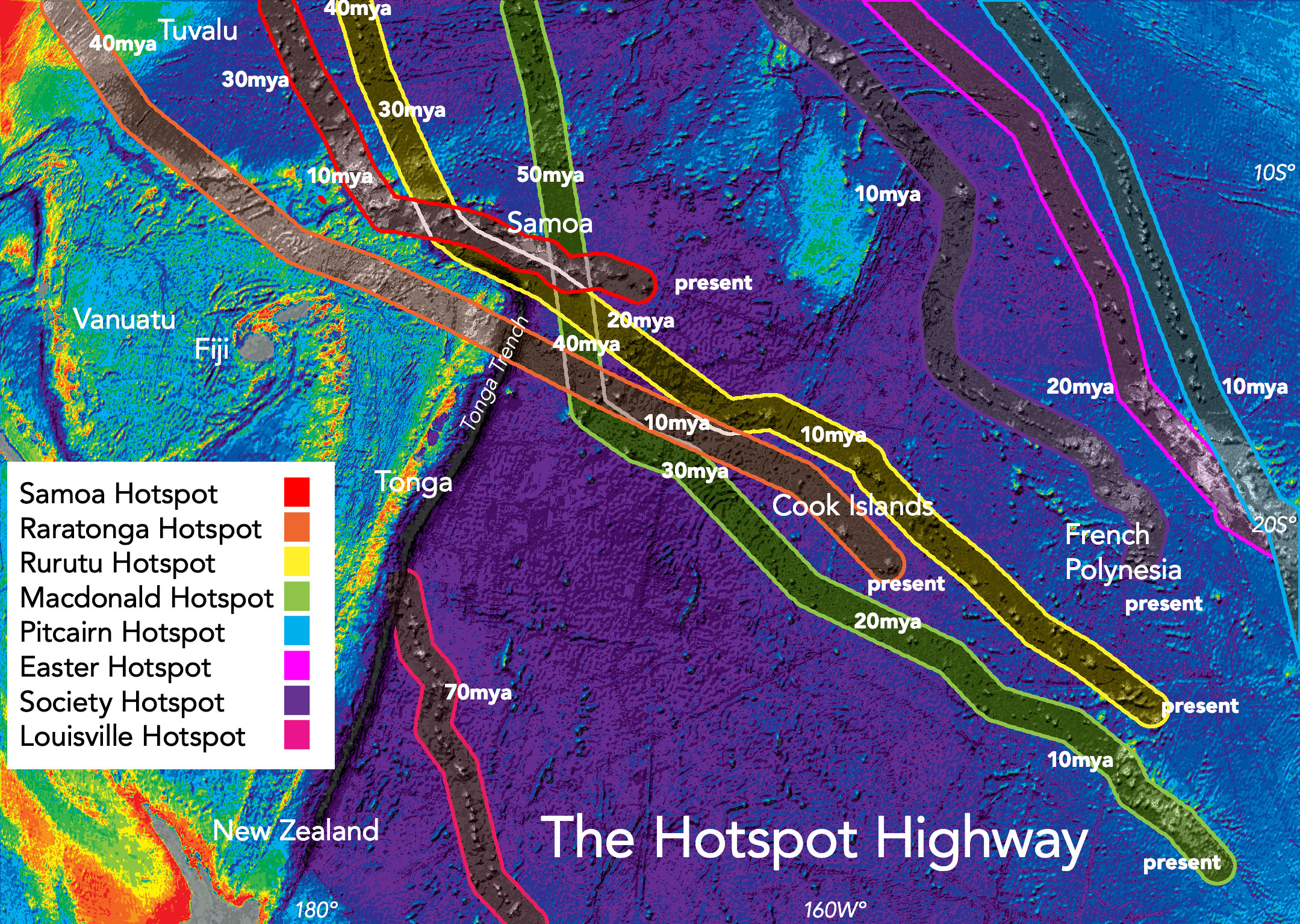
The Hotspot Highway

"Hotspot highway" is a term coined in 2010 by Boston University professor Matthew G. Jackson to describe the area of the South Pacific where the postulated tracks of the Samoa, Macdonald, Rurutu, and Rarotonga hotspots all cross paths with one another.

While the concept has stood the test of time, the key overlapping hotspot tracks appear to be what are now termed the Macdonald hotspot and Arago hotspot which have 10 million years separation but crossed each other's paths just south of Samoa. The volcanics of the highway concept are related to the tectonic implications of the breakup of the Ontong Java-Hikurangi-Manihiki large igneous province and of the Pacific large low-shear-velocity province. The tracks are still being redefined by further research and show for example gaps in the Arago hotspot chain with wrong assignment to it rather than the Samoan chain which means there is now little evidence for a cross over between the two.

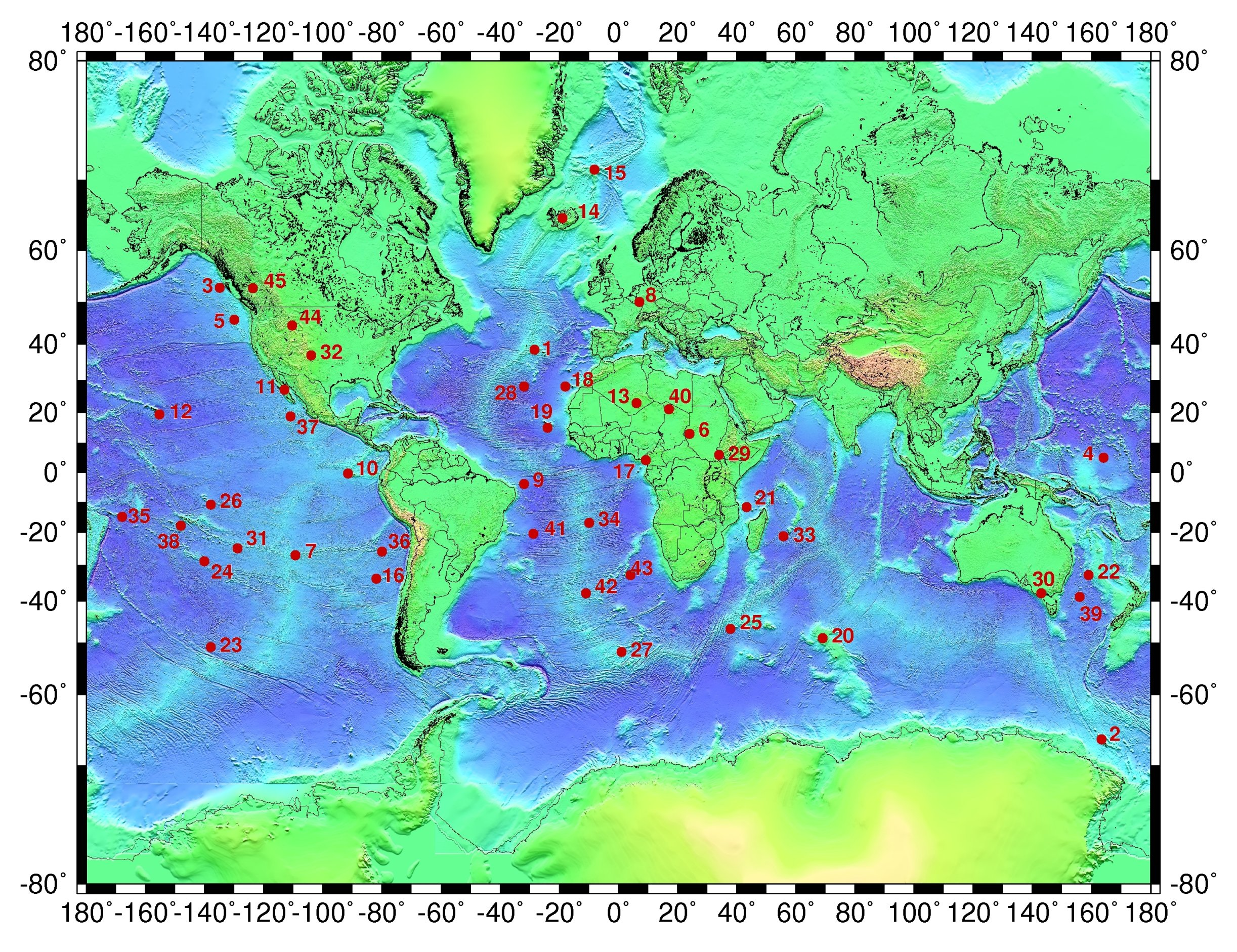
Map of volcanic hotspots

Geochemical evidence from several volcanoes in the Samoan region is consistent with the argument that older hotspot tracks are present in the Samoan archipelago. Rose Atoll, Malulu, Papatua and Waterwitch seamounts plot the Samoan track and are not geochemically consistent with the other Samoan islands. However Papatua and Waterwitch have evidence that some of their volcanics are related to the Samoan hotspot, Malulu has yet to be extensively sampled, while Rose Atoll composition is quite different to the Samoan hotspot volcanics.
