= Lemkein =

Seamount in the Pacific Ocean

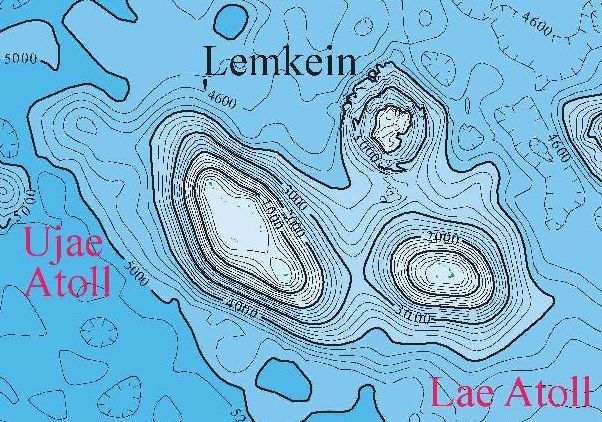

Location
- Coordinates: 9°18′N 166°05′E

Lemkein is a seamount in the Western Pacific Ocean, west of Kwajalein.

It is part of the Magellan Seamounts and is a volcanic seamount covered with sediments. Ferromanganese crusts occur in some places. Basalts in the form of pillow lavas altered to clay and zeoliths have been recovered from Lemkein. Like other Magellan Seamounts, it formed south of the equator and was moved to its present-day position by plate tectonics.
