= Lomilik =

Seamount

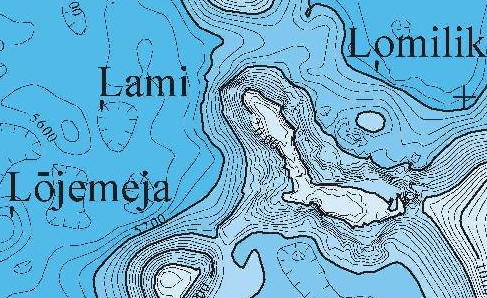
- Bathymetry of Lomilik and Ļami Seamounts

- Location in the Marshall Islands
- Summit depth: 1,350 metres (4,430 ft)

Location
- Coordinates: 11°42′N 161°37′E
- Country: Marshall Islands

Lomilik is a seamount in the Western Pacific Ocean, within the exclusive economic zone of the Marshall Islands. It lies to the west of Enewetak atoll and is named after the best fishing site in Anewetak atoll.

Lomilik has a 40-by-15-kilometre-wide (24.9 mi × 9.3 mi) summit terrace with the proper summit at circa 1,500 metres (4,900 ft) depth; a scarp separates the two and small hills reach depths of 1,350 metres (4,430 ft). The summit terrace is covered by rocks with ooze in between. A notch in the southern flank of Lomilik was likely created by a landslide. It is part of the Magellan Seamounts and consists of a Cretaceous volcano with a thin layer of carbonate rocks and ferromanganese. Lami seamount lies northwest of Lomilik.

The rocks found on Lomilik consist of basalt and limestone. Fluorapatite, hyaloclastite, mudstone, phosphorite and siltstone have been identified in rocks from the seamount. Manganese nodules have been found on Lomilik and the manganese crusts on the seamount reach thicknesses of over 10 centimetres (3.9 in); the thickest crust recovered from an ocean is a 18 centimetres (7.1 in) thick ferromanganese crust from Lomilik recovered in 1989. The deposits on Lomilik could potentially be mined.
