= Ruwitūn̄tūn̄ =

Guyot in the Marshall Islands in the Pacific Ocean

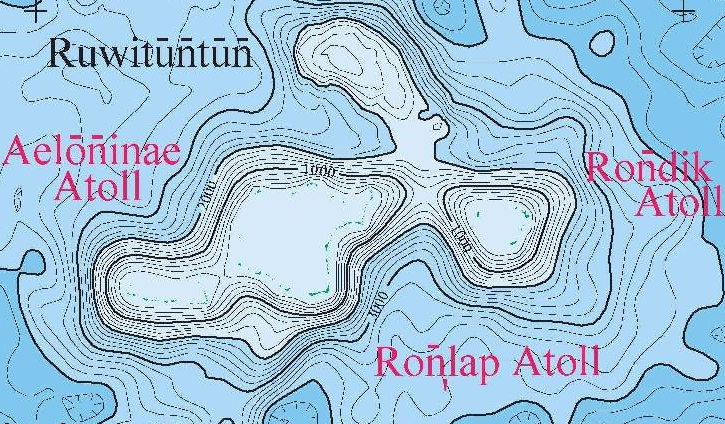

Location in the Marshall Islands

Ruwitūn̄tūn̄ is a guyot in the Pacific Ocean which reaches a depth of 1,215 metres (3,986 ft) below sea level. It is capped off with a summit platform covered in sediments and some volcanic pinnacles with craters. Basaltic rocks have been found on Ruwitūn̄tūn̄.

== History ==
Aptian to Campanian age has been inferred from fossils found on Ruwitūn̄tūn̄, including Albian rudists. A Campanian limestone has also been found on Ruwitūn̄tūn̄.

== Geological context ==
Bathymetric map of the Marshall Islands

A number of flat-topped seamounts rise from the floor of the western Pacific Ocean to depths of 1,000–2,000 metres (3,300–6,600 ft) below sea level. They are called guyots and are clustered in an elongated region with and between the Marshall Islands and the Tuamotus. It is presumed that hotspots generated most of these seamounts.

The Marshall Islands are grouped in two chains and three groups, the Ratak Chain including Limalok Guyot, the Ralik Chain including Wōdejebato Guyot and an isolated cluster farther west including Eniwetok Island.
