= Lo-En =

Albian–Campanian guyot in the Marshall Islands in the Pacific Ocean

- Location within Marshall Islands

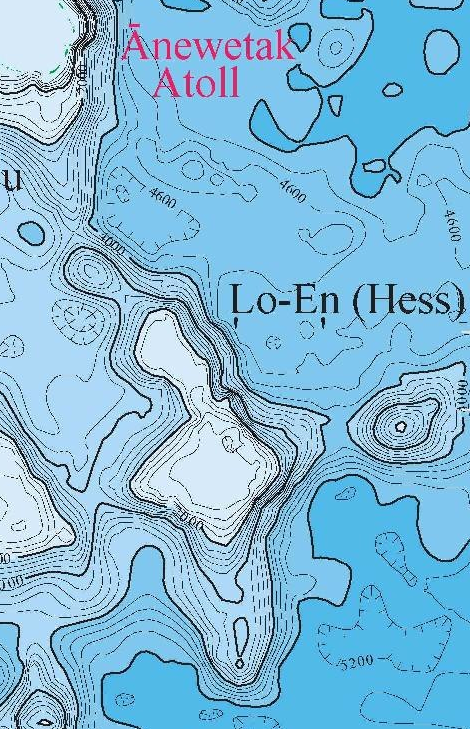
- Bathymetry of Lo-En Guyot
- Summit depth: 1,080 metres (3,540 ft)
- Height: 4,561 ± 526 metres (14,964 ± 1,726 ft)
- Summit area: 823 square kilometres (318 sq mi)

Location
- Coordinates: 10°07′N 162°48′E
- Country: Marshall Islands

Geology
- Type: Guyot

Lo-En or Hess is an Albian–Campanian guyot in the Marshall Islands. One among a number of seamounts in the Pacific Ocean, it was probably formed by a hotspot in what is present-day French Polynesia. Lo-En lies southeast of Eniwetok which rises above sea level, and Lo-En is almost connected to it through a ridge.

The seamount is formed by basaltic rocks that probably formed a shield volcano first. It is believed that a number of hotspots such as the Macdonald hotspot, the Rarotonga hotspot and the Rurutu hotspot may have been involved in the formation of Lo-En. After volcanic activity, by the Turonian the seamount was submerged although it is possible that a carbonate platform formed during the Albian. After a hiatus, sedimentation commenced on the seamount in Oligocene time and led to the deposition of manganese crusts and pelagic sediments including limestone, some of which were later modified by phosphate.

== Name and research history ==
The name "Lo-En" is a reference to the hibiscus tree. The seamount was formerly known as Hess Guyot. In 1992 the seamount was targeted for drilling in the Ocean Drilling Program.

== Geography and geology ==
=== Local setting ===
Lo-En lies within the northern Marshall Islands, less than 150 kilometres (93 mi) south-southeast from Eniwetok. It is part of a cluster of seamounts and islands that surrounds Eniwetok, but also appears to be part of a chain running parallel to the Ralik Chain and the Ratak Chain, two seamount-and-island chains in the Marshall Islands.

The seamount rises 4,561 ± 526 metres (14,964 ± 1,726 ft) above the seafloor to a depth of 1,080 metres (3,540 ft) below sea level. Lo-En is elongated in north–south direction and is a typical guyot. Its flat top has dimensions of 30 by 40 kilometres (19 mi × 25 mi) and a surface area of 823 square kilometres (318 sq mi). A volcanic pinnacle is embedded in the sediments on top of Lo-En, it is either a volcanic formation that resisted erosion or a volcanic vent that was active after Lo-En was submerged. There are other cones which emerge from the sediments and which appear to be of volcanic origin in light of the dredged rocks, as well as lobate structures. Terraces occur on Lo-En's southwestern rim and may be products of landslides. The magnetization pattern of the seamount has been investigated; it is classified as "normal" but with particular magnetization patterns that are different from the topography.

No carbonate cap or limestones have been found on the platform of Lo-En, unlike in several other guyots of the region; a drill core at Lo-En found pelagic sediments directly on the volcanic basement. However, remains of reefs and of lagoonal sediments have been detected on seismic profiles although the existence of a barrier reef has been questioned, and Lo-En has a 141.7–143.6-metre (465–471 ft) thick pelagic sediment cap. It is possible that shallow water limestones exist at the margins of the platform, which were not drilled.

Lo-En shares its volcanic edifice with Eniwetok; a northern spur from Lo-En almost reaches Eniwetok while another spur emerges in south-southeast direction and is about 14.5 kilometres (9.0 mi) long. Another seamount lies 50 kilometres (31 mi) farther west from Lo-En. The seafloor underneath Lo-En is 113–156.9 ± 5 million years old and lies at a depth of more than 5 kilometres (3.1 mi).

=== Regional setting ===
Illustration of how hotspot volcanoes work

The Pacific Ocean seafloor, especially the parts that are of Mesozoic age, contains most of the world's guyots. These are flat-topped submarine mountains which are characterized by steep slopes, a flat top and usually the presence of corals and carbonate platforms. It is not clear whether the Cretaceous guyots were atolls in the present-day sense but many of these seamounts were, which today still exist. All these structures originally formed as volcanoes in the Mesozoic Ocean. First fringing reefs may have developed on the volcanoes, which then became barrier reefs as the volcano subsided and turned into an atoll. Continued subsidence balanced by upward growth of the reefs led to the formation of thick carbonate platforms. Sometimes volcanic activity occurred even after the formation of the atoll or atoll-like landforms, and during episodes where the carbonate platforms were lifted above sea level erosional features such as channels and blue holes developed. The crust underneath these seamounts tends to subside as it cools and thus the islands and seamounts sink.

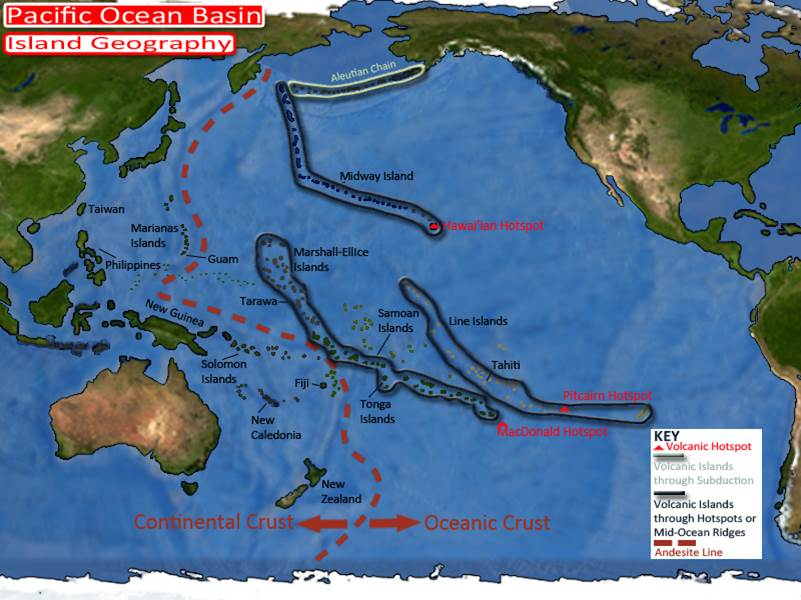
Maps of the paths of some Pacific hotspots

The formation of many such seamounts including Limalok has been explained with the hotspot theory, which discusses the formation of chains of volcanoes which get progressively older along the length of the chain, with an active volcano only at one end of the system. Seamounts and islands in the Marshall Islands do not appear to have originated from such simple age-progressive hotspot volcanism as the age progressions in the individual island and seamount chains are often inconsistent with a hotspot origin. One solution to this dilemma may be that more than one hotspot passed through the Marshall Islands, as well as the possibility that hotspot volcanism is affected by contemporaneous lithospheric extension.

Candidate hotspots responsible for the formation of Lo-En are the Macdonald hotspot which passed close to Lo-En between 115 and 105 million years ago and the Rarotonga hotspot and Rurutu hotspot, both of which were at Lo-En between 90 and 74 million years ago. Of these, the first two also have the strongest geochemical similarity to Lo-En. In the case of Lo-En, volcanism on the Ogasawara fracture zone may also have contributed to its formation considering that the seamount is much older than surrounding seamounts.

Based on plate motion reconstructions, the region of the Marshall Islands was located in the region of present-day French Polynesia during the time of active volcanism. Both regions display numerous island chains, anomalously shallow ocean floors and the presence of volcanoes. About 8 hotspots have formed a large number of islands and seamounts in that region, with disparate geochemistries, and that geological province has been called the "South Pacific Isotopic and Thermal Anomaly" or DUPAL anomaly.

=== Composition ===
Lo-En has erupted alkali basalt and hawaiite. Minerals contained in the rocks include apatite, biotite, clinopyroxene, ilmenite, magnetite and plagioclase. Strong alteration has occurred and has given rise to calcite, carbonate, chabazite, clay, hematite, smectite and zeolite, as well as palagonite. Other rocks found on Lo-En are chalk, limestone, manganese crusts, phosphate and sandstone.

== Geologic history ==
The geologic history of Lo-En seamount is relatively poorly known; paleomagnetic data have been used to infer an age of 45–85 million years ago for the seamount. It was located at about 25–30 degrees southern latitude when it formed, south of the hotspots that are presently active in the Cook Islands–Austral Islands. Eniwetok is about 36 million years younger than Lo-En.

=== Volcanism and first biotic phenomena ===
A first phase of volcanic activity occurred 114 million years ago, and was followed by a second episode during the Campanian, separated by as much as 30 million years. The first episode has been dated at 111.6–114.0 million years ago and was contemporaneous with volcanic activity at other western Pacific seamounts. The second episode may be responsible for the cones that emerge from or are embedded in sediments that cover Lo-En. Eniwetok was active 76.9 million years ago and flexural effects from its growth may have influenced the second volcanic phase at Lo-En. Potentially, the first episode was caused by the Macdonald hotspot and the second by the Rarotonga and Rurutu hotspots.

The volcanic rocks encountered in drill cores consist of breccia and lava flows. Their alkalic composition implies that they may be post-shield volcanics. Claystones indicate that weathered terrain occurred on Lo-En, with subaerial alteration of volcanic rocks.

=== Post-volcanic ===
Lo-En was submerged in the Turonian by about 112.8 ± 1.2 million years ago, long before surrounding seamounts and islands formed. The absence of a barrier reef would have facilitated the erosion of Lo-En's summit. It is possible that flexural loading by Eniwetok pushed Lo-En downward and thus prevented the formation of reefs on Lo-En during the Cretaceous when the seamount was uplifted by a hotspot. It took about 2–7 million years from the end of volcanic activity until sedimentation began.

During the Albian, limestones were emplaced on Lo-En. These appear to reflect the formation of reefs and a shallow carbonate bank, material from which has been dredged on the southern flank. This platform drowned during the late Albian, similar to many other carbonate platforms of similar age, and there is no evidence of mid-Cretaceous platforms.

Starting in the Albian–Cenomanian, pelagic limestone was deposited directly on the volcanic rocks during Santonian–Coniacian times; in light of fossil data it is likely that the seamount was not overly deep at that time. Sediments of Cretaceous–Paleocene age reach thicknesses of less than 1 metre (3 ft 3 in).

Starting in the Oligocene, pelagic oozes were deposited on Lo-En. The previously emplaced limestones also underwent phosphate reactions as they were exposed on the seafloor, and some of the sediments underwent reworking.

Foraminifera encountered on the seamount in the form of nannofossils are:

- Arkangelskiella specillata
- Aspidolithus parcus expansus
- Eiffellithus eximius
- Gephyrorhabdus coronadventis
- Lithastrinus septenarius
- Micula sp.
- Nannoconus farinacciae
- Reinhardtites sp.
- Stoverius sp.
