= Marquesas hotspot =

Volcanic hotspot in the Pacific Ocean

Coordinates: 10.5°S 139°W

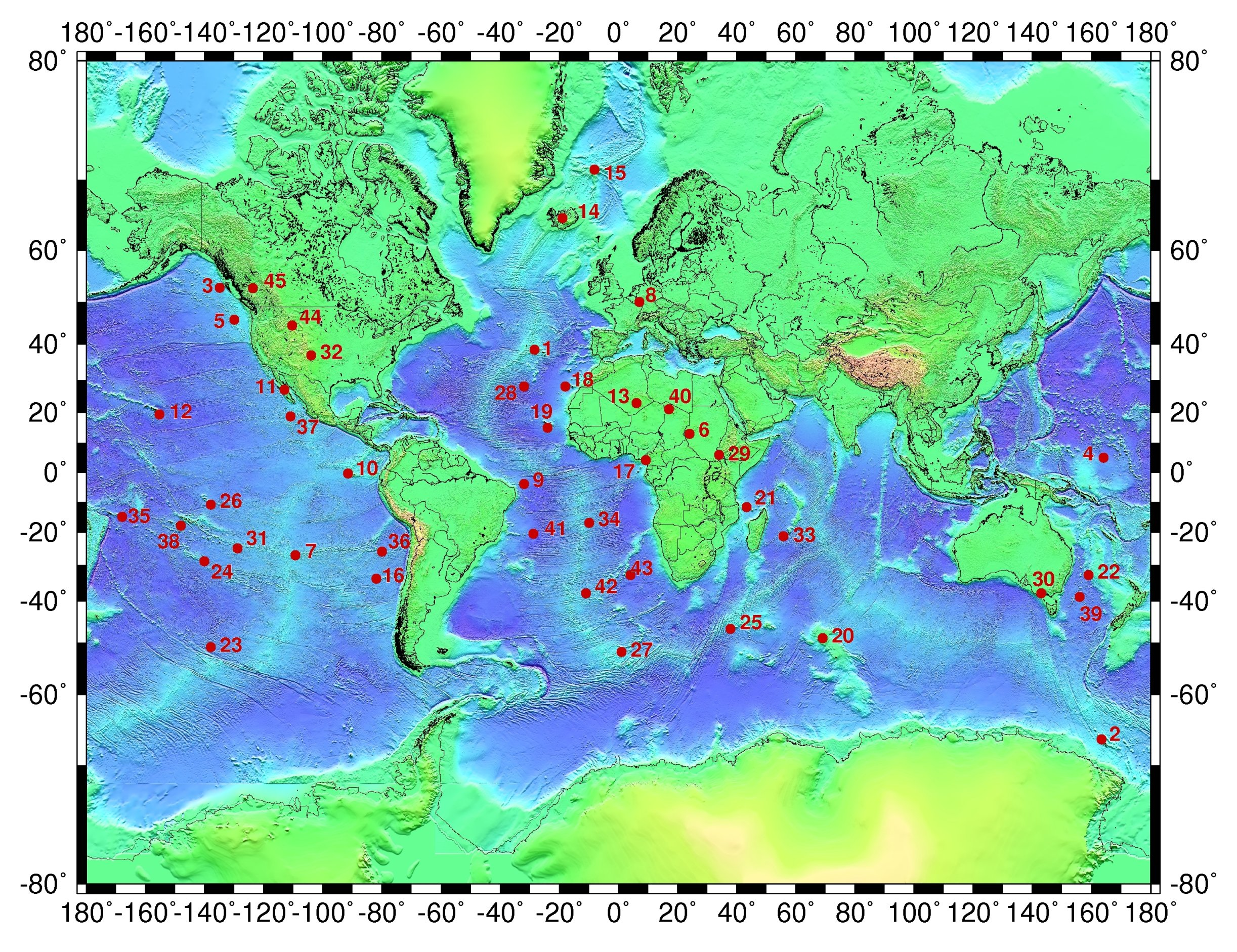
The Marquesas hotspot is marked 26 on the map

The Marquesas hotspot is a volcanic hotspot in the southern Pacific Ocean. It is responsible for the creation of the Marquesas Islands – a group of eight main islands and several smaller ones – and a few seamounts. The islands and seamounts formed between 5.5 and 0.4 million years ago and constitute the northernmost volcanic chain in French Polynesia.

There are two competing theories concerning the origins of volcanism associated with the Marquesas hotspot. Many geoscientists maintain that the area is underlain by a mantle plume which has transported hot material from the lower mantle to the surface, forming the chain of islands and seamounts as the Pacific Plate moved in a north-westerly direction relative to the stationary plume. Radiometric dating of the youngest volcanic rocks suggests that volcanism is still active. Evidence for a plume origin comes mainly from seismic imaging, with large-scale low velocity anomalies being observed from the core-mantle boundary to around 1000 km depth and interpreted as a superplume, and smaller, shallow anomalies interpreted as narrow secondary plumes generated by the superplume. Geochemical analysis of the lavas has also been argued to favour a deep-mantle source, though the extent to which source depth can be determined by lava geochemistry has been disputed.

Some features of the Marquesas, such as the trend of the islands and seamounts, non-fixity of the source, and short-lived volcanic activity, have been argued to conflict with the plume model. The trend of the chain and non-fixity of the source, however, may be explained by the plume conduit either being deflected by convection currents in the upper mantle or melt being channelled through zones of structural weakness. Volcanic activity may be much longer-lived if the plume also created Hess Rise and Shatsky Ridge to the northwest, both of which follow the same trend as the Marquesas and are dated at 100 Ma and 145–125 Ma respectively.

Nevertheless, some scientists dispute the plume model, arguing instead that volcanic activity associated with the Marquesas hotspot and others in the southern Pacific results from shallow tectonic processes. In this interpretation, volcanism in the Marquesas is a consequence of intraplate stresses caused primarily by reorganisations of plate boundaries and thermal contraction of the lithosphere. These processes, it is argued, have generated a system of fissures which enable pre-existing melt in the crust and upper mantle to escape to the surface. The primary evidence for this interpretation is the timing of volcanic activity and orientation of the Marquesas chain, which coincide closely with major reorganisations of plate boundaries and consequent changes in the lithospheric stress field.

== See also ==
- Arago hotspot
- Rarotonga hotspot
