= Limalok =

Cretaceous-Paleocene guyot in the Marshall Islands

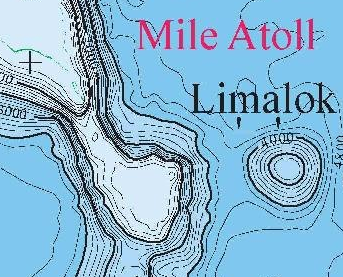

- Location within Marshall Islands
- Summit depth: 1,255 metres (4,117 ft)
- Summit area: 636-square-kilometre (246 sq mi)

Location
- Group: Ratak Chain
- Coordinates: 5.6°N 172.3°E
- Country: Marshall Islands

Geology
- Type: Guyot
- Age of rock: Cretaceous

Limalok (formerly known as Harrie or Harriet) is a Cretaceous (Note: Between ca. 145 and 66 million years ago.)-Paleocene (Note: Between 66 and 56 million years ago.) guyot/tablemount in the southeastern Marshall Islands, one of a number of seamounts (a type of underwater volcanic mountain) in the Pacific Ocean. It was probably formed by a volcanic hotspot in present-day French Polynesia. Limalok lies southeast of Mili Atoll and Knox Atoll, which rise above sea level, and is joined to each of them through a volcanic ridge. It is located at a depth of 1,255 metres (4,117 ft) and has a summit platform with an area of 636 square kilometres (246 sq mi).

Limalok is formed by basaltic rocks and was probably a shield volcano at first; the Macdonald, Rarotonga, Rurutu and Society hotspots may have been involved in its formation. After volcanic activity ceased, the volcano was eroded and thereby flattened, and a carbonate platform formed on it during the Paleocene and Eocene. These carbonates were chiefly produced by red algae, forming an atoll or atoll-like structure with reefs.

The platform sank below sea level 48 ± 2 million years ago during the Eocene, perhaps because it moved through the equatorial area, which was too hot or nutrient-rich to support the growth of a coral reef. Thermal subsidence lowered the drowned seamount to its present depth. After a hiatus lasting into the Miocene, (Note: 23.3–5.333 million years ago) sedimentation commenced on the seamount leading to the deposition of manganese crusts and pelagic sediments; phosphate accumulated in some sediments over time.

== Name and research history ==
Limalok was formerly known as Harrie Guyot and is also known as Harriet Guyot; Limalok refers to a traditional chieftess of Mile Atoll. Limalok is one of the seamounts targeted during the Ocean Drilling Program, which was a research program that aimed at elucidating the geological history of the sea by obtaining drill cores from the oceans. The proportion of material recovered during the drilling was low, making it difficult to reconstruct the geologic history of Limalok.

== Geography and geology ==
=== Local setting ===
Limalok lies at the southernmost end of the Ratak Chain in the southeastern Marshall Islands in the western Pacific Ocean. Mili Atoll is located 53.7 kilometres (33.4 mi) from Limalok, with Knox Atoll in between the two.

The relatively small seamount rises from a depth of 4,500 metres (14,800 ft) to a minimum depth of 1,255 metres (4,117 ft) below sea level. The top of Limalok is 47.5 kilometres (29.5 mi) long and broadens southeastward from less than 5 kilometres (3.1 mi) to more than 24 kilometres (15 mi), forming a 636-square-kilometre (246 sq mi) summit platform. The carbonate platform of Limalok crops out at the edges of the summit plateau. Wide terraces and numerous fault blocks surround the summit plateau; some of the latter may have formed after the carbonate platform ceased growing.

Mili Atoll and Limalok emerge from a common pedestal and are connected by a ridge at 1.5 kilometres (0.93 mi) depth. The seafloor is 152–158 million years old, but it is possible that Limalok rises from Cretaceous flood basalts (Note: Flood basalts are very large accumulations of basaltic lava flows.) rather than the seafloor itself. Volcanic sediments in the Eastern Mariana Basin may come from this seamount.

=== Regional setting ===
Illustration of how hotspot volcanoes work

The Pacific Ocean seafloor, especially the parts that are of Mesozoic age, contains most of the world's guyots (also known as tablemounts). These are submarine mountains which are characterized by steep slopes, a flat top and usually the presence of corals and carbonate platforms. These structures originally formed as volcanoes in the Mesozoic Ocean. Fringing reefs may have developed on the volcanoes, which then were replaced by barrier reefs as the volcanoes subsided and turned into atolls. Continued subsidence balanced by upward growth of the reefs led to the formation of thick carbonate platforms. Volcanic activity can occur even after the formation of the atoll or atoll-like (Note: Whether the Cretaceous guyots were all atolls in the present-day sense is often unclear.) landforms, and during episodes where the platforms were lifted above sea level, erosional features such as channels and blue holes (Note: Pit-like depressions within carbonate rocks that are filled with water.) developed. The crust underneath these seamounts tends to subside as it cools and thus the islands and seamounts sink.

The formation of many seamounts including Limalok has been explained with the hotspot theory, in which a "hot spot" rising from the mantle leads to the formation of chains of volcanoes which get progressively older along the length of the chain, with an active volcano at only one end of the system, as the plate moves over the hotspot. Seamounts and islands in the Marshall Islands do not appear to have originated from simple age-progressive hotspot volcanism as the age progressions in the individual island and seamount chains are often inconsistent with this explanation. One solution to this dilemma may be that more than one hotspot passed through the Marshall Islands, and it is also possible that hotspot volcanism was affected by extensional deformation of the lithosphere. For Limalok, geochemical evidence shows affinities to the Rarotonga hotspot which is unlike the geochemical trends in the other volcanoes of the Ratak Chain. Reconstructions of the area's geological history suggest that the first hotspot to pass by Limalok was the Macdonald hotspot 95–85 million years ago, followed by the Rurutu hotspot and the Society hotspot 75–65 million years ago. The Rarotonga and especially the Rurutu hotspots are considered to be the most likely candidates for the hotspot that formed Limalok. However, some paleogeographical inconsistencies indicate that lithospheric fractures secondary to hotspot activity were also involved.

From plate motion reconstructions, it has been established that the Marshall Islands were located in the era now occupied by present-day French Polynesia during the time of active volcanism. Both regions display numerous island chains, anomalously shallow ocean floors and the presence of volcanoes. About eight hotspots have formed a large number of islands and seamounts in that region, with disparate geochemistries; the geological province has been called "South Pacific Isotopic and Thermal Anomaly" or DUPAL anomaly.

=== Composition ===
Limalok has erupted basaltic rocks, which have been classified as alkali basalts, basanite and nephelinite. Minerals contained in the rocks are apatite, augite, biotite, clinopyroxene, olivine, nepheline and plagioclase, and there are ultramafic xenoliths. Shallow crystal fractionation processes appear to have been involved in the genesis of the magmas erupted by Limalok.

Alteration of the original material has formed calcite, chlorite, clay, iddingsite, montmorillonite, zeolite, and a mineral that could be celadonite. Volcanogenic sandstones and traces of hydrothermal alteration also exist on Limalok.

Carbonate, clay, manganese phosphate crust materials (Note: Asbolane, birnessite and buserite are found in the crusts.) and mudstones have been found in boreholes or have been dredged from the seamount. The carbonates take various forms, such as grainstone, packstone, limestone, rudstone and wackestone. Porosity is usually low owing to cementation of the deposits, a process in which grains in rock are solidified and pores filled by the deposition of minerals such as calcium carbonate. The carbonate rocks show widespread evidence of diagenetic alteration, meaning the carbonates have been chemically or physically modified after they were buried. For example, aragonite, pyrite and organic material were formed by alteration of living beings within the clays and limestones.

== Geologic history ==
Paleogene graphical timeline
← / PETM; ← / First Antarctic permanent ice-sheets; ← / K-Pg mass extinction
Subdivision of the Paleogene according to the ICS, as of 2024. Vertical axis scale: Millions of years ago

Limalok is the youngest guyot in the Marshall Islands. Argon-argon dating has yielded ages of 69.2 and 68.2 ± 0.5 million years ago on volcanic rocks dredged from Limalok. Mili Atoll volcano is probably not much younger than Limalok. During the Cretaceous Limalok was probably located in French Polynesia; paleomagnetism indicates that Limalok formed at 15–10 degrees southern latitude. Early limestones dredged from Limalok were considered to be of Eocene age (56–33.9 million years ago) before earlier Paleocene deposits were discovered as well.

=== Volcanism and first biotic phenomena ===
Limalok first formed as a shield volcano. The volcanic rocks were emplaced as lava flows with thicknesses reaching 1–7 metres (3 ft 3 in – 23 ft 0 in). In addition, breccia (Note: Volcanic rocks that appear as fragments.) and pebbles encased within sediments occur.

Soils formed on the volcano through the weathering of volcanic rocks, reaching a thickness of 28.6 metres (94 ft); claystones and laterites were also generated through weathering. These deposits formed over a long time on an island that rose at least several metres above sea level – the estimated time it took to generate the soil profiles obtained in drill cores is about 1–3 million years. Thermal subsidence of the crust and erosion flattened the seamount before carbonate deposition commenced on Limalok, and it is possible that the growth of another volcano south of Limalok 1–2 million years after Limalok developed may be responsible for a southward tilt of the seamount.

The soils on Limalok were colonized by vegetation that left plant cuticle and woody tissues; angiosperms including palms, ferns and fungi with an overall low diversity developed on the volcano. Organisms burrowed into the soils, leaving cavities. The climate was probably tropical to subtropical, with an annual precipitation of less than 1,000 millimetres per year (39 in/year).

=== Platform carbonates and reefs ===
The erosion of the volcanic island was followed after some time by the beginning of carbonate platform growth. Sedimentation began in the Paleocene with one or two events in which the seamount was submerged; the start of sedimentation has been dated to about 57.5 ± 2.5 million years ago. After a Paleocene phase with open sea or back-reef conditions, lagoonal environments developed on the seamount during the Eocene. It is possible that the platform periodically emerged above sea level, leading to its erosion. It is not clear if the platform took the form of an atoll, or of a shallow platform shielded on one side by islands or shoals, similar to the present-day Bahama Banks. Sea level rise at the Paleocene-Eocene transition may have triggered a transformation from a partially shielded platform to a true ring-shaped atoll.

The carbonate platform reaches an overall thickness of 290 metres (950 ft) in one drill core. Drill cores in the platform show variations between individual carbonate layers that imply that parts of the platform were submerged and emerged over time while the platform was still active, possibly because of eustatic sea level variations. Furthermore, the platform was affected by storms which redeposited the carbonatic material. The deposition of the platform lasted about 10 million years, spanning the Paleocene-Eocene Thermal Maximum (PETM). (Note: The Paleocene-Eocene Thermal Maximum was a short period about 55.8 million years ago where atmospheric carbon dioxide levels and temperatures dramatically increased.) Drill core evidence shows that the PETM had little impact on carbonate deposition at Limalok despite a decrease in the δ13C isotope ratio recorded in the carbonates, implying there was little change to ocean pH at that time.

The dominant living beings on Limalok were red algae that occupied many ecological niches and formed rhodoliths. (Note: Nodule-like assemblies of algae which deposit carbonates.) Other lifeforms were bivalves, bryozoans, corals, echinoderms, echinoids, foraminifera, (Note: Among the foraminifera genera found on Limalok are Alveolina, Asterocyclina, Coleiconus, Discocyclina, Glomalveolina, Guembelitroides and Nummulites.) gastropods, molluscs and ostracods. Species and general composition varied over time, leading to different species being found in different parts of the platform. Red algae were important early colonizers, and algal mats and oncoids (Note: Pebble-like growths formed by cyanobacteria.) were contributed by algae and/or cyanobacteria.

=== Drowning and post-drowning evolution ===
A carbonate platform is said to 'drown' when sedimentation can no longer keep up with relative rises in sea level, and carbonate deposition stops. Limalok drowned during the early-middle Eocene, soon after the start of the Lutetian, 48 ± 2 million years ago. It is the most recent carbonate platform in the region to submerge: the similar platform at neighbouring Mili Atoll is still depositing carbonate.

The drownings of carbonate platforms such as Limalok, MIT, Takuyo-Daisan and Wōdejebato appear to have many causes. One is a sea level drop resulting in the emergence of much of the platform; this reduces the space that carbonate-forming organisms have to grow upward when sea levels again rise. A second factor is that these platforms were not true reefs but rather piles of carbonate sediment formed by organisms; these constructs cannot easily out-grow sea level rises when growing on a constrained area. Two final key factors are the passage of the platforms through nutrient-rich equatorial waters which cause the overgrowth of algae that hampered the growth of reef-forming organisms, and global temperature extremes that may overheat the platforms especially when close to the equator; present-day coral bleaching events are often triggered by overheating and Limalok and the other seamounts were all approaching the equator when they drowned. In the case of Limalok and some other guyots, paleolatitude data support the notion that approaching the equator led to the demise of the platforms.

After the platform ceased growing, subsidence quickly lowered the tablemount below the photic zone, (Note: The uppermost layers of water in the sea, through which sunlight can penetrate.) where sunlight can still penetrate. Hardgrounds (Note: In stratigraphy, hardgrounds are solidified layers of sediments.) and iron-manganese crusts formed on the drowned platform which contain Oligocene (33.9–23.02 million years ago) sediments and planktonic fossils. Some of the rocks underwent phosphatization during three separate episodes in the Eocene and Eocene–Oligocene which may have been triggered by ocean upwelling events at that time. The Palaeocene-Eocene thermal maximum and accompanying ocean acidification left no recognizable traces in Limalok's carbonate pile.

Until the Miocene, sedimentation on Limalok was probably hindered by strong currents. Renewed significant sedimentation began at that point after the drowning of Limalok, with sediments consisting mainly of foraminifera and other nanofossils. Some of the sediments were reworked after deposition. At least two layers formed during the Miocene (23.3–5.333 million years ago) and Pliocene–Pleistocene (5.333–0.0117 million years ago), reaching a cumulative thickness of 100–140 metres (330–460 ft). Chemically, most of the sediments are calcite and they often occur in rudstone or wackestone form. Bivalves, echinoderms, foraminifera and ostracods (Note: Ostracod taxa include Bradleya, various cytherurids, Eucythere, Krythe and Tongacythere.) are fossilized in the sediments, which sometimes contain borings and other traces of biological activity.
