= Arago hotspot =

Hotspot in the Pacific Ocean

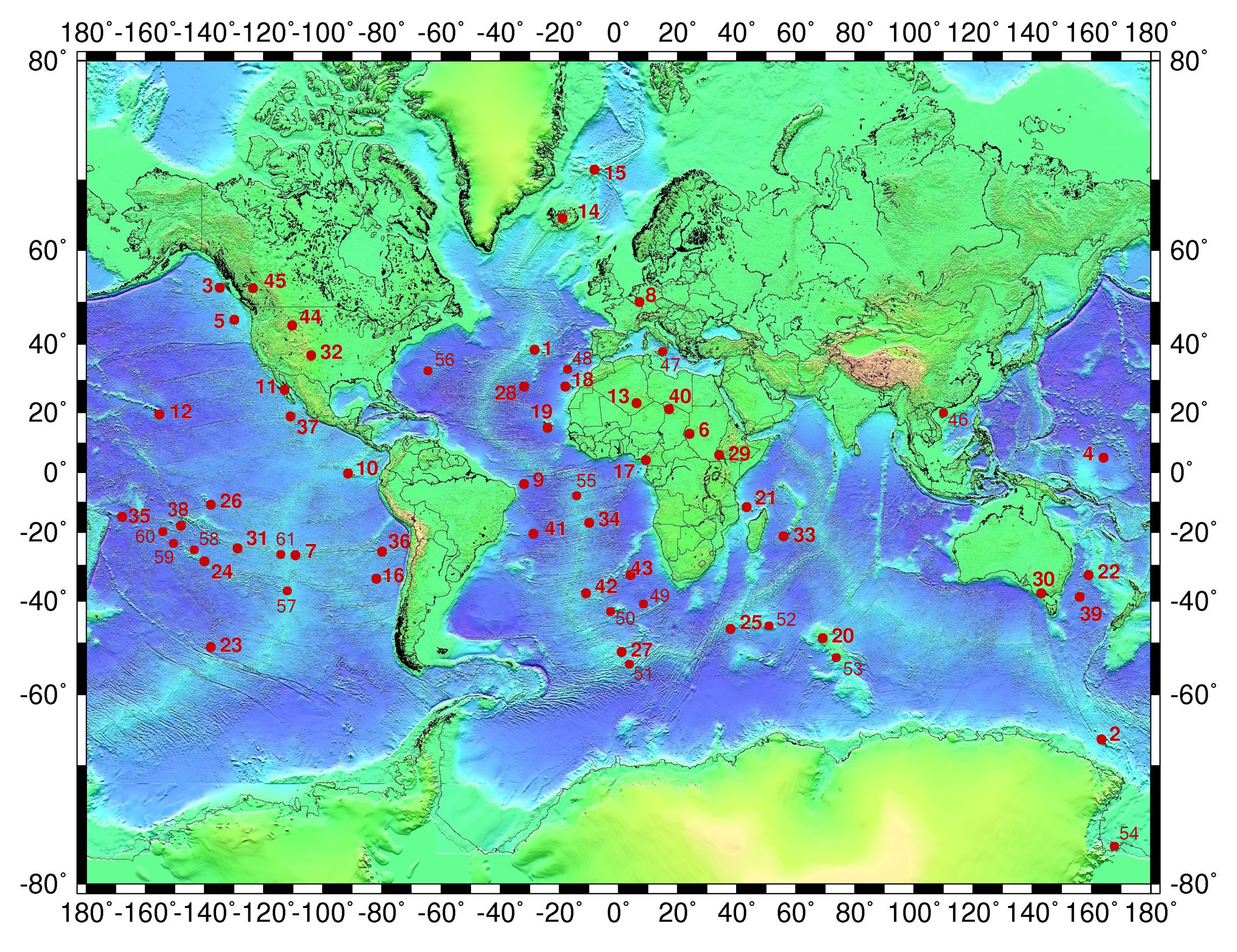
Map of the hotspots on Earth. Arago is #59

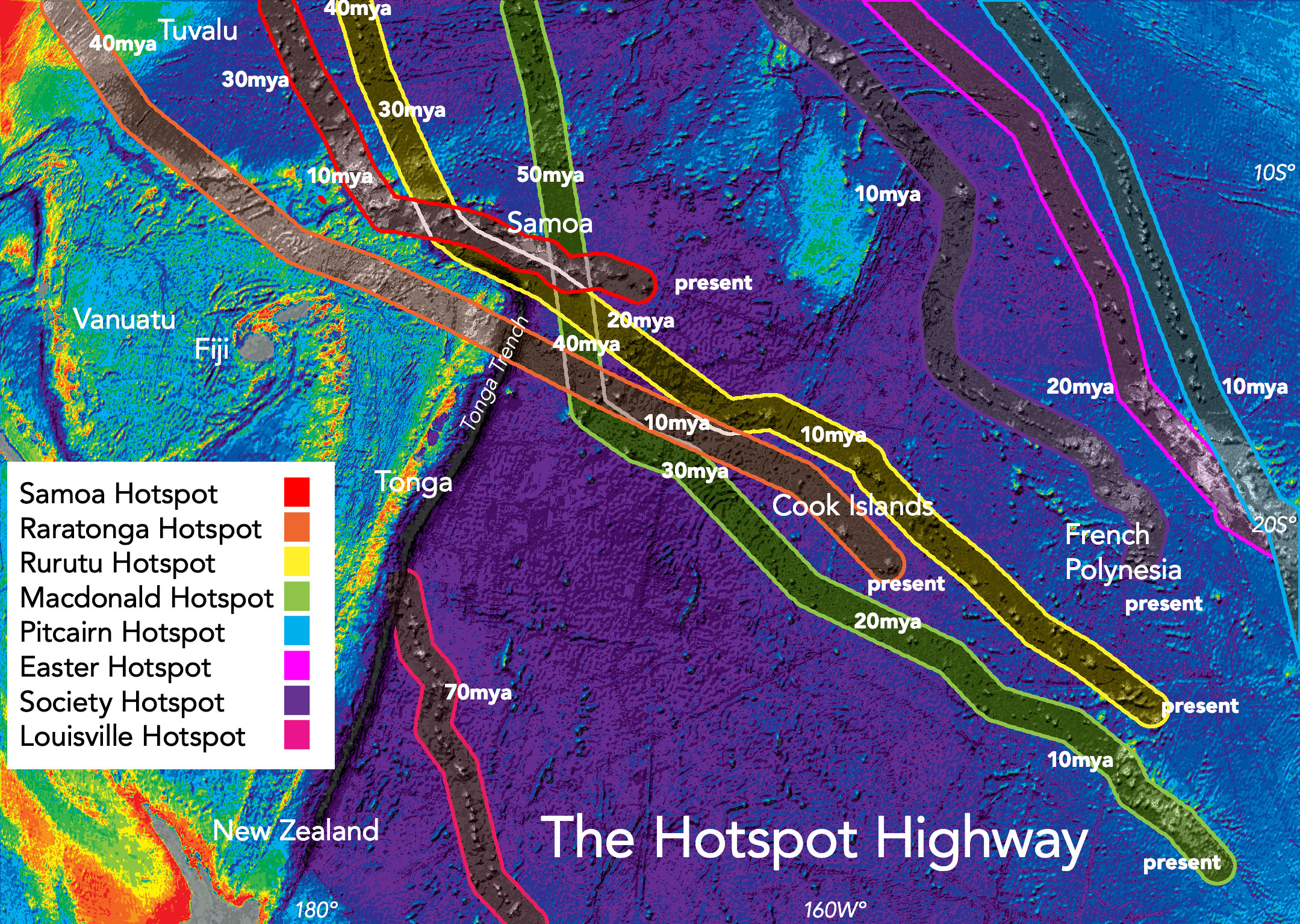
The Arago hotspot is a component of the South Pacific Ocean Hotspot highway

Arago hotspot (also known as the Rurutu hotspot, Young Rurutu hotspot or Atiu hotspot) is a hotspot in the Pacific Ocean, presently located below the Arago seamount close to the island of Rurutu, French Polynesia.

Arago is part of a family of hotspots in the southern Pacific, which include the Society hotspot and the Macdonald hotspot among others. These are structures beneath Earth's crust which generate volcanoes and which are in part formed by mantle plumes, although Arago itself might have a shallower origin. As the Pacific plate moves over the hotspots, new volcanoes form and old volcanoes are carried away; sometimes an older volcano is carried over the hotspot and is then uplifted as happened with Rurutu.

The Arago hotspot is responsible for the formation of Arago seamount and uplift on Rurutu; however reconstructions of the past positions of tectonic plates and geochemistry suggest that other islands and seamounts were constructed by the Arago hotspot during the past 120 million years. These potentially include the Wake Seamounts, the Ratak Chain of the Marshall Islands, numerous seamounts northwest of the Marshall Islands, Tuvalu, Gilbert Islands as well as part of the Austral Islands and Cook Islands.

== Name ==
The hotspot is named after the Arago seamount 130 kilometres (81 mi) southeast of Rurutu. The seamount is named after the French Navy ship Arago, which discovered the seamount in 1993. The ship itself is named after astronomer François Arago. Polynesians knew of the existence of the shallow (27 metres (89 ft) beneath sea level) seamount and named it Tinomana. Before the link to Arago seamount was discovered, the hotspot was also known as "Rurutu hotspot", a name sometimes still used, which is a name also used for an older volcanic chain that starts at Raivavae or President Thiers Bank. Other names are "Young Rurutu" and "Atiu trend"; "Old Rurutu" refers to the Macdonald hotspot.

== Geography and geology ==
The approximate current location of Arago hotspot is superimposed on the seafloor height abnormality modelled for the South Pacific superswell
Legend
- Key for the depth anomaly:
- 0 meters or more
- 250 meters or more
- 500 meters or more

The islands in the southern Pacific Ocean

The southern Pacific Ocean is the site of the South Pacific superswell, an area where the ocean is anomalously shallow (by about 700 metres (2,300 ft)) and which covers an area of about 3,000 by 3,000 kilometres (1,900 mi × 1,900 mi). Underneath this superswell a large mantle plume might give rise to secondary plumes which in turn form the surface hotspots. Hotspots in the region are the Macdonald hotspot, Marquesas hotspot, Pitcairn hotspot and Society hotspot; of which the first and the last appear to be rooted deep in the mantle. The nature of the volcanism in the area is not completely understood.

Arago Seamount is part of the volcanic chain that forms the Austral Islands and Cook Islands. The 2,200 kilometres (1,400 mi) long chain consists of two separate trends that form two atolls and eleven islands; of these systems one (Macdonald seamount) is a still active volcano. The ages of these islands follow an approximate age progression typical of a hotspot volcano but the occurrence of younger ages on Aitutaki and Rurutu and the chemistry of these younger rocks indicated that there must be more than one hotspot involved. Recent models envisage the presence of a number of separate hotspot tracks in what has been dubbed a "hotspot highway", first named as such in 2010, fed by plumes 1,000–1,200 kilometres (620–750 mi) apart. Further, some hotspots such as the Hawaii hotspot show evidence of movement but the Arago hotspot appears to be static.

The Arago and other hotspots probably are not deep mantle plumes but rather more shallow structures that are also influenced by the lithosphere; in the case of the Arago hotspot the absence of an oceanic plateau that could have been formed by the head of the mantle plume supports such a shallow origin. The upper mantle might be the source of the Arago hotspot. Data on the presence of seismic velocity anomalies and whether they are positive (higher) or negative (lower) beneath Arago are contradictory. Seismic imaging published in 2009 indicates only a slight seismic velocity anomaly shallower than 100 kilometres (62 mi), with no indication of a deep mantle root. More recent research however has endorsed a deep mantle origin for the Arago hotspot. Presently, Arago and the Macdonald hotspot are the two active hotspots of the Austral Islands, but a hotspot that formed Rarotonga may also still be active; additional hotspots in the area are Tubuai, Taukina and Ngatemato. Arago is a long lived hotspot that could be as much as 140 million years old.

=== Arago Seamount ===
The eponymous Arago Seamount is a composite volcano with three rift zones, similar to Rurutu. The seamount was formed by three volcanoes with one overlapping the other two; potassium-argon dating on Arago has yielded ages of 230,000 ± 4,000 before present and an imprecise age of 0 years before present. There is some evidence of submarine landslide activity, a typical occurrence on ocean volcanoes, with one landslide scar each on the northern, eastern and western flank. This seamount is considered to be the present location of the hotspot, given its young age; however, unlike Macdonald, Arago Seamount has no recorded historical eruptions.

Hotspots other than the Arago hotspot may have contributed to the growth of the Arago Seamount; a hotspot associated with Raivavae and potentially the President Thiers Bank has been associated through isotope analysis with 8.2 million year old samples taken from Arago Seamount. Other volcanoes in the region also show evidence that they were built by more than one hotspot; this might indicate that their formation is controlled by lithospheric features or by multiple hotspots in sequence.

=== Other islands and seamounts ===
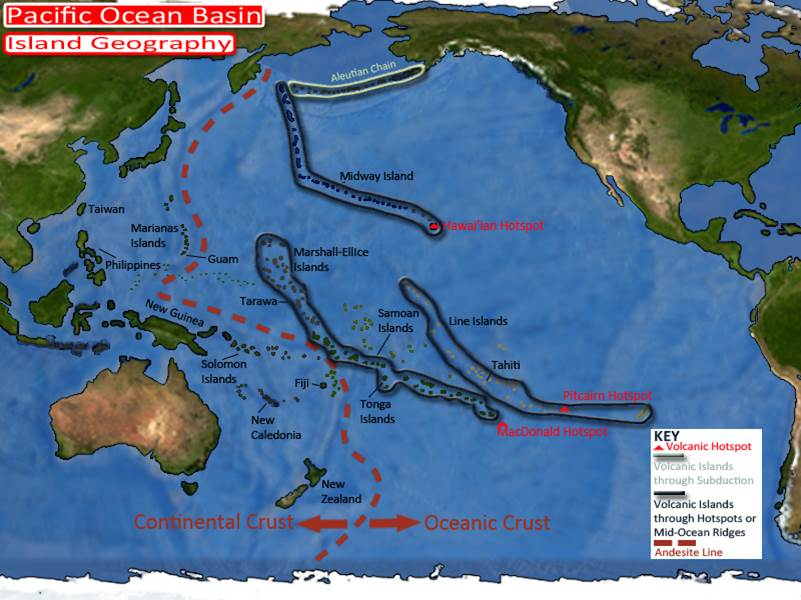
Hotspot provinces in the Pacific Ocean; Arago belongs to the "Macdonald" province

As the Pacific Plate drifted over the hotspot several volcanoes were formed on the hotspot where weaknesses in the crust allowed the penetration of magma, and were subsequently carried away, at a rate of about 120 millimetres per year (4.7 in/year). Isotope ratios of lead in the volcanic rocks tie the younger volcanics of Rurutu to the Arago hotspot, the ratio in this case is characterized by high radiogenic lead isotope composition ("HIMU"). Some volcanic material from the Arago hotspot may have been recycled in the mantle and mixed into the magmas erupted in the northeastern Lau basin; rocks shed from seamounts created by the Arago hotspot may have been subducted in the Tonga trench which is close to the reconstructed path of the Arago hotspot and then erupted onto the Lau basin. HIMU xenoliths have been found in Tubuai just ahead of Arago Seamount as well.

Rurutu already existed before the interaction with the Arago hotspot, having been formed by an older volcanic episode; when it moved over the Arago hotspot a volcanic episode occurred and emplaced lava flows that are formed by basanite and hawaiite. Also, the island and surrounding coral reef were uplifted, and these uplifted coral reefs (known as makatea) caught the attention of early geologists, who were speculating as to what might have lifted the reefs out of the sea already in 1840. Other uplifted atolls occur northwest from Rurutu and may have formed in the same way when they passed over the Arago hotspot.

The following volcanics are at least tentatively attributed to the Arago hotspot:

- The 1 million years old episode of Rurutu (22°26′S 151°20′W).
- The ZEP2-6 (22°24′S 151°10′W), ZEP2-7 (22°19′S 151°31′W) and ZEP2-8 (22°42′S 151°20′W) seamounts close to Rurutu have similar morphologies to the island and may have been formed by the Arago hotspot.
- Rimatara (22°38′S 152°51′W).
- ZEP2-12 seamount (22°28.8′S 153°6.7′W) close to Rimatara has been dated at 2.6 million years ago and may be linked to Arago.
- The 19 million year old rocks from Mangaia (21°55′30″S 157°55′30″W), although the Macdonald hotspot has also been considered responsible for these rocks.
- Possibly Îles Maria (21°48′S 154°41′W). Maria may be close to the present-day position of another hotspot.
- Possibly Mitiaro (19°49′S 157°42′W).
- Possibly Takutea (19°48′57″S 158°17′03″W).
- Possibly Manuae (19°16′10″S 158°58′00″W).
- Atiu (19°59′20″S 158°07′10″W) and Mauke (20°09′20″S 157°20′30″W) likewise with the characteristic "HIMU" chemistry, but more questionable owing to differences in neodymium isotope ratios and because no basaltic outcrops can be inspected on Mauke.
- Aitutaki (18°53′00″S 159°47′00″W), specifically the older volcanic series according to geochronology and isotope ratios.
- Possibly Palmerston Island (18°03′30″S 163°09′35″W).
- Rose Atoll (14.5448748°S 168.1732392°W) east of Samoa 24.8 ± 1.0 million years ago.
- Some seamounts in western Samoa ("Samoan Seamounts") such as Bayonnaise (12°00′S 179°30′W), East Niulakita (11°00′S 179°50′E), Kosciusko (10°30′S 179°40′E) and Silaga (10°15′S 179°50′W), which were emplaced together with Tuvalu between 63-42 or 40-50 million years ago. These are also known as the "interloper seamounts" and include Malulu and Papatua close to the Samoa hotspot. Other undated seamounts in Samoa have been linked to the Arago hotspot on the basis of geochemical evidence. This region has been called the "hotspot highway" and a number of hotspot tracks intersect there, including these of the Arago, Rarotonga and Samoa hotspots.
- Part of the Arago hotspot track may have been buried under volcanoes formed by the Samoa hotspot. It is possible, but unlikely, that any part of the Arago track has been subducted in the Tonga Trench.
- Tuvalu (8°S 178°W, 50–70 million years ago), preceding a "bend" in the hotspot track similar to the bend in the Hawaiian-Emperor seamount chain. In the case of the Arago hotspot, the "bend" occurred about 50 million years ago close to the atolls Funafuti and Nukufetau, the latter of which has eruption ages consistent with activity of the Arago hotspot. Trace element isotope ratios and argon-argon dating of samples taken from seamounts support this theory.
- Possibly Gilbert Islands (1°N 173°E, 64–70 million years ago), also supported by isotope data. The plate reconstruction might require some wander by the Arago hotspot in such a case, however.
- Possibly Tokelau (9°00′S 171°45′W). Tokelau however has isotope similarity to the Macdonald hotspot, and plate reconstructions place Tokelau over the Macdonald hotspot.
- Possibly most of the Ratak Chain of the Marshall Islands between 74 and 100 million years ago. One theory supposes that some volcanoes there were built in various stages by the Arago hotspot and other hotspots in the region. The plate reconstruction may require some wander by the Arago hotspot to fit.
  - This includes the Wōdejebato (11°55′N 164°51′E) and Limalok (5°42′N 172°12′E) Guyots: Wōdejebato is reconstructed to have passed over the Arago hotspot 85 million years ago and a volcanic rock sample from this guyot is dated 84.4 million years ago, while Limalok was in such a position 75 million years ago. Other hotspots in the area of Arago may also have participated; Strontium and lead isotope data from Wōdejebato have affinities to these of the Arago hotspot.
  - Woden-Kopakut Guyot (14°00′N 167°27′E) has an age of 80.6–83.8 million years ago, similar to the age of 82 million years which is when the guyot was carried over the Arago hotspot.
  - Enewetak (11°33′N 162°10′E) and Lo-En Guyots (10°09′N 162°48′E) likewise are on the path of the Arago hotspot but there is no evidence of volcanism during the time when they were over Arago (90-85 million years ago), with the possible exception of glass shards of Campanian age from Lo-En. Plate reconstructions indicate that Lo-En may have been located too far south of the hotspot path to be formed by the Arago hotspot.
- Possibly Magellan Seamounts and West Pacific Seamount Province over 100 million years ago on the basis of geochemical similarities. Some possible associations are improbable for chronological reasons, e.g Ita Mai Tai.
  - Wake Island (19.2898828°N 166.6138514°E).
  - Kocebu Guyot (17.5°N 153°E).
  - Skornyakova Guyot (17°N 150°E).
  - Older stage of Pako Guyot (15°30′N 155°0′E) together with the Rarotonga hotspot.
- Marcus-Wake seamounts (20°N 158°E) between 100 and 150 million years ago, including Lamont Guyot (21.5°N 159.6°E, less than 87 million years ago), Miami Guyot (21.7°N 161.9°E, 97 million years old) and Wilde Guyot (21.2°N 163.4°E, 91 million years old). Both isotope ratios from rocks sampled on the guyots and reconstructions of former plate positions support that the Marcus-Wake seamounts were built by the Arago hotspot, although not all guyots are sampled and a stronger link exists to the Southern Wake seamounts. Research published in 2022 indicates that the Arago hotspot may have contributed to their growth more indirectly while a 2025 publication argued a direct linkage of the Wake seamounts to Arago.
- Volcanism in the Eastern Mariana Basin 117 million years ago.
- 126.1 ± 0.6 million year old dolerite sills which were drilled into in 1992 in the seafloor of the Eastern Mariana Basin (22°N 152°E) show similar geochemistry to Arago hotspot volcanites and plate reconstructions place the sills above the Arago hotspot at the time of their formation.
- The Himu (21°42′N 151°42′E) and Golden Dragon (21°21′N 153°20′E) seamounts show similar composition to the Arago hotspot volcanic rocks and are located where the Arago hotspot would have been about 120 million years ago, when the Himu seamount was formed.
- The trail of volcanoes ends in the Mariana Trench, however material from older seamounts may have been accreted to the trench forearc and there is evidence that volcanoes of the Marianas Islands at the site where the Arago hotspot track is expected to subduct have been influenced by hotspot-derived rocks.

The oldest volcanic structures potentially formed by the Arago hotspot are 120 million years old. If their attribution is correct, the Arago hotspot may be the oldest still active hotspot in the Pacific Ocean, jointly with the Samoa hotspot and ahead of the Hawaii hotspot and the Louisville hotspot. A contrasting viewpoint believes that Arago is a short-lived hotspot with few dated volcanoes along its predicted path. Assuming the first is the case, it is possible to fit Pacific Plate movements over the last 80 million years to the widely separate postulated tracks of this hotspot, the Louisville hotspot and the Hawaii hotspot very well.

The island of Tubuai is located ahead of the hotspot, and the island will be transported over it in a few million years. As with Rurutu, this interaction will lead to uplift in Tubuai and possibly to renewed volcanism.

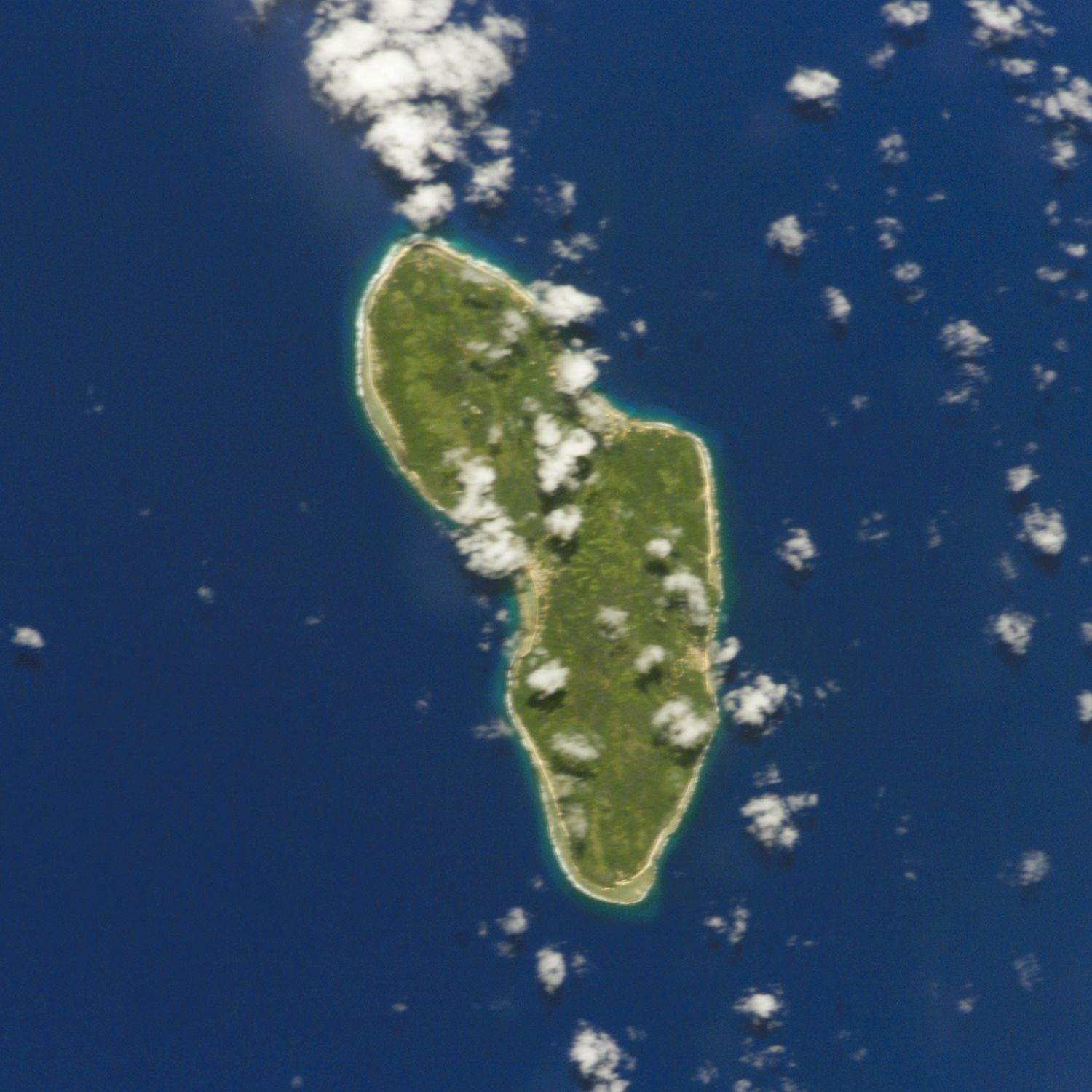
Rurutu

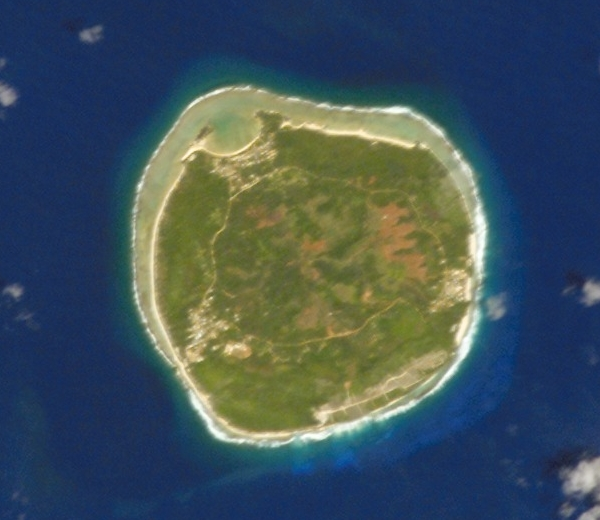
Rimatara

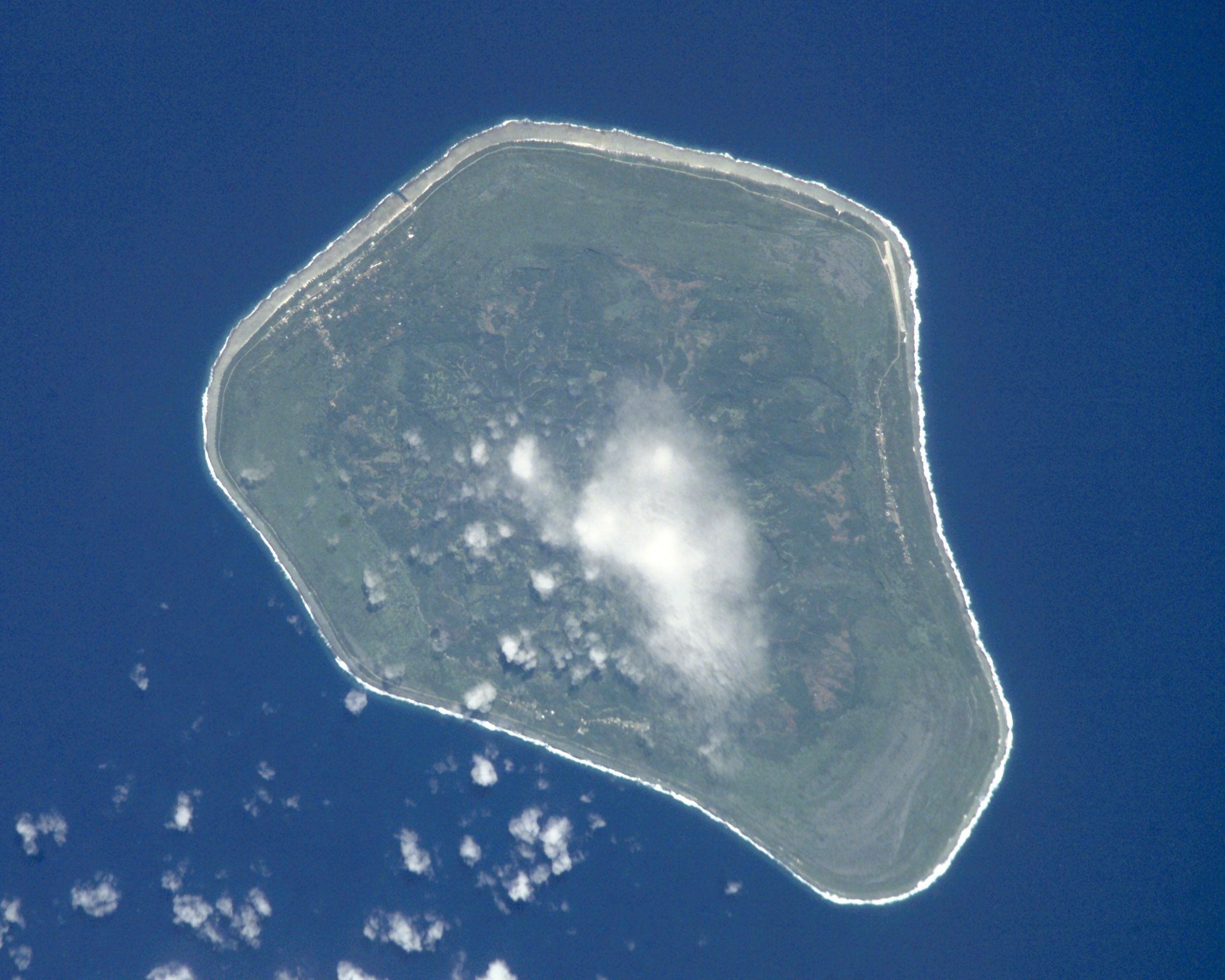
Mangaia

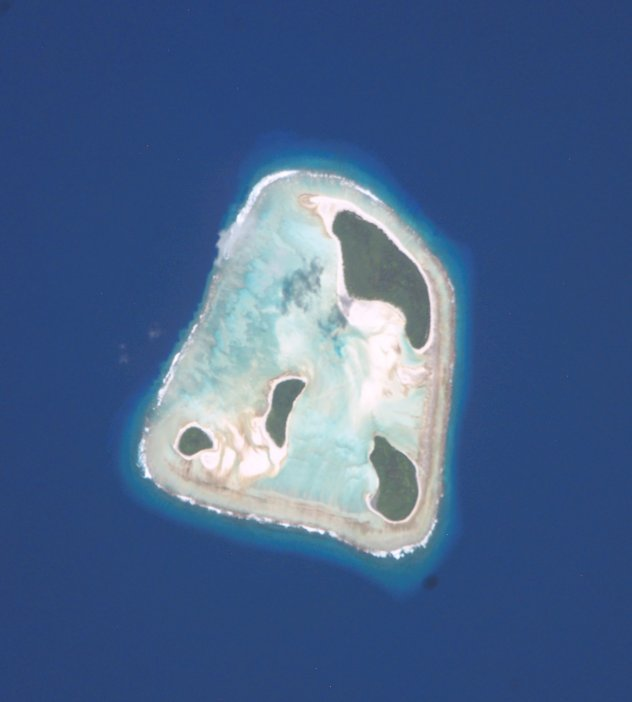
Îles Maria

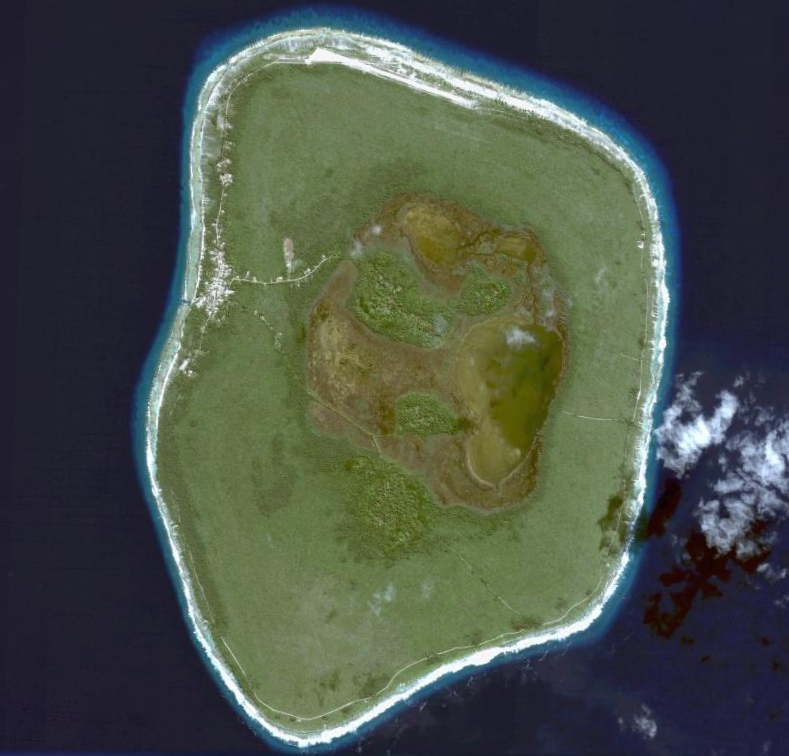
Mitiaro

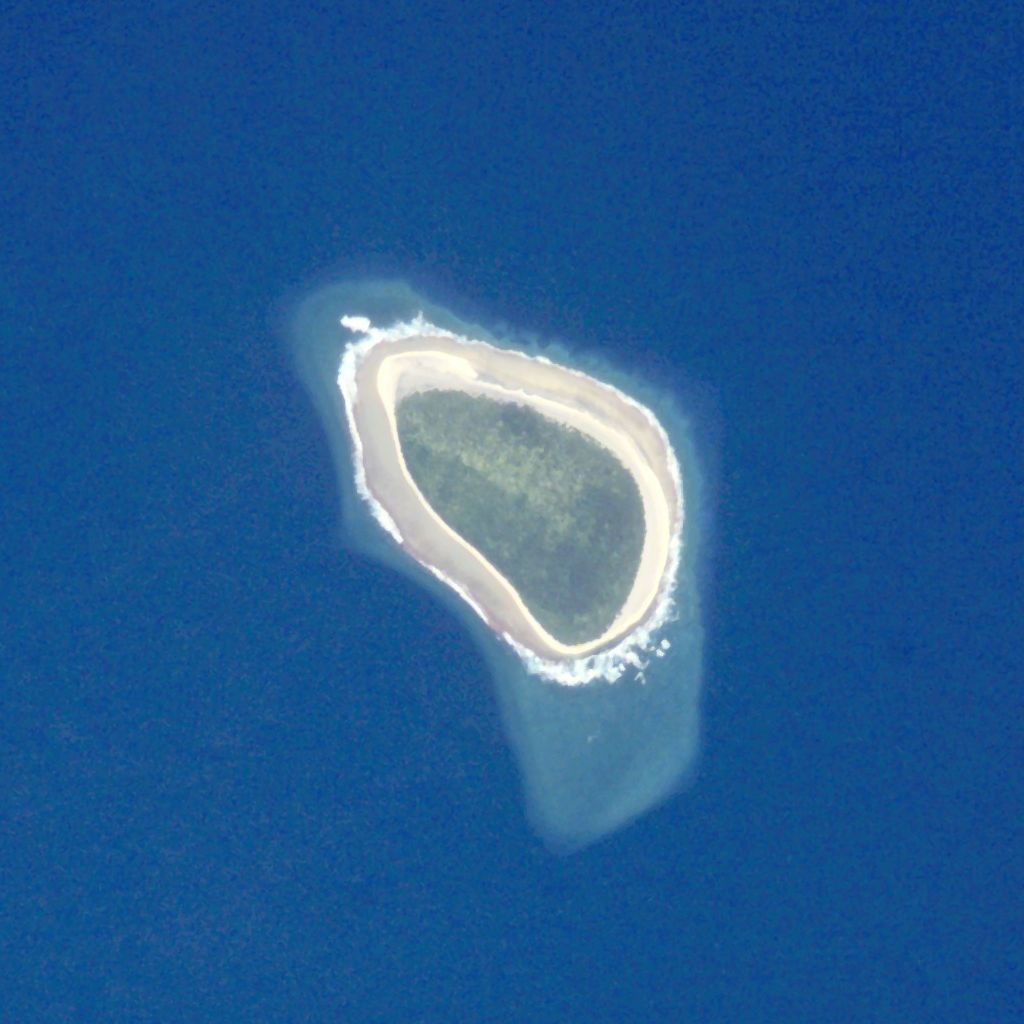
Takutea

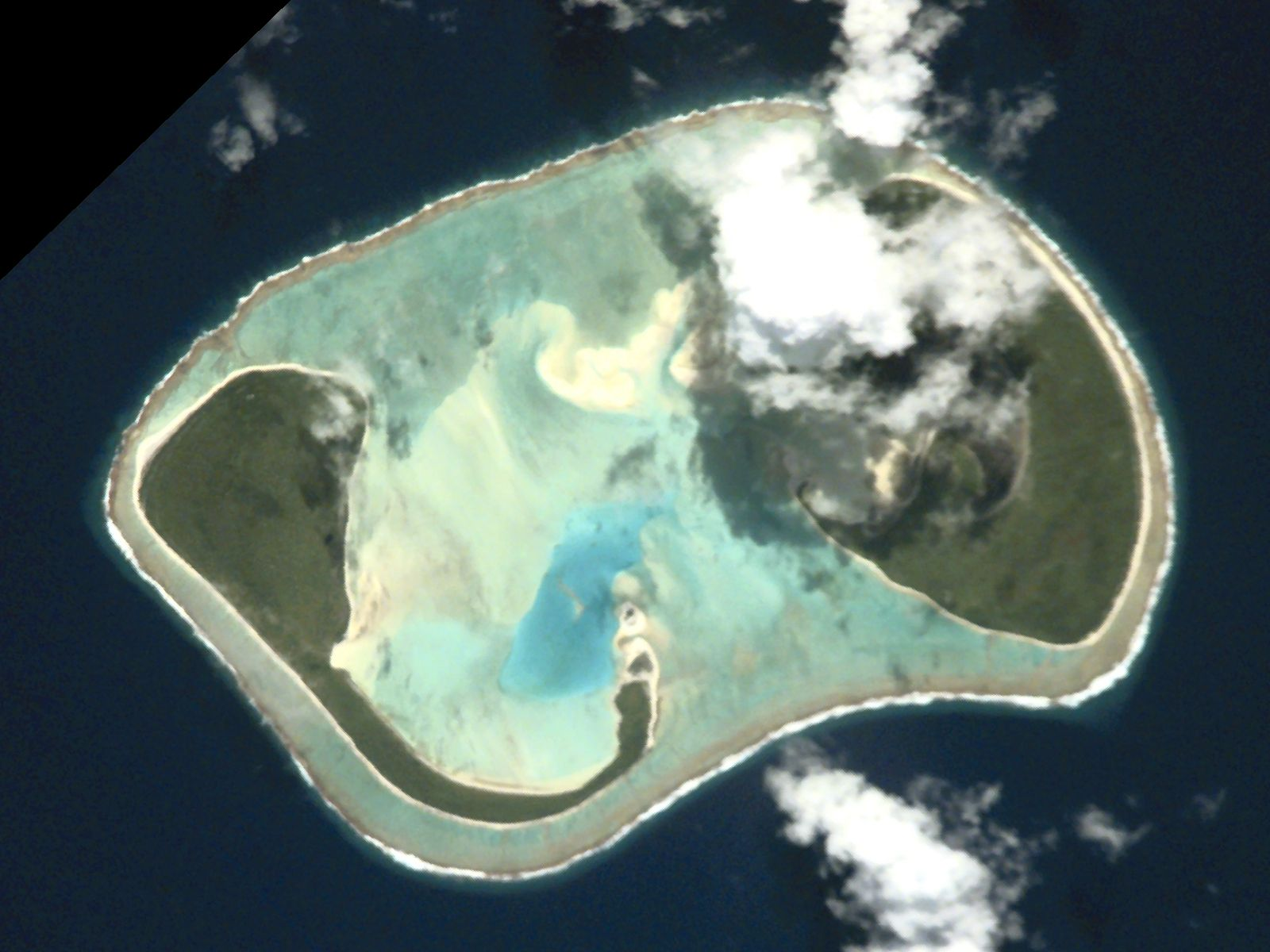
Manuae

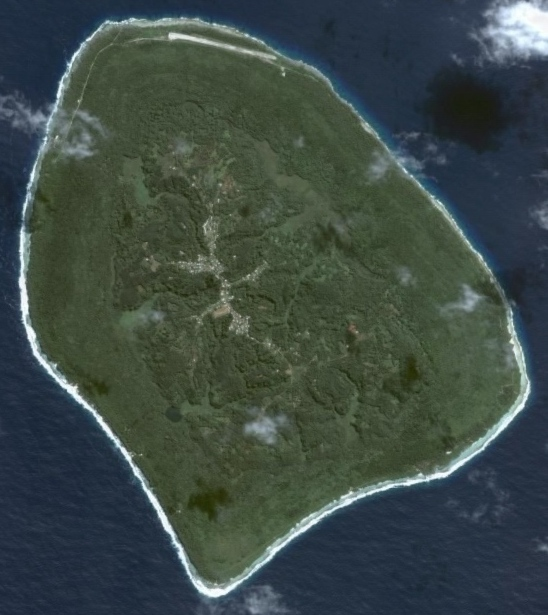
Atiu

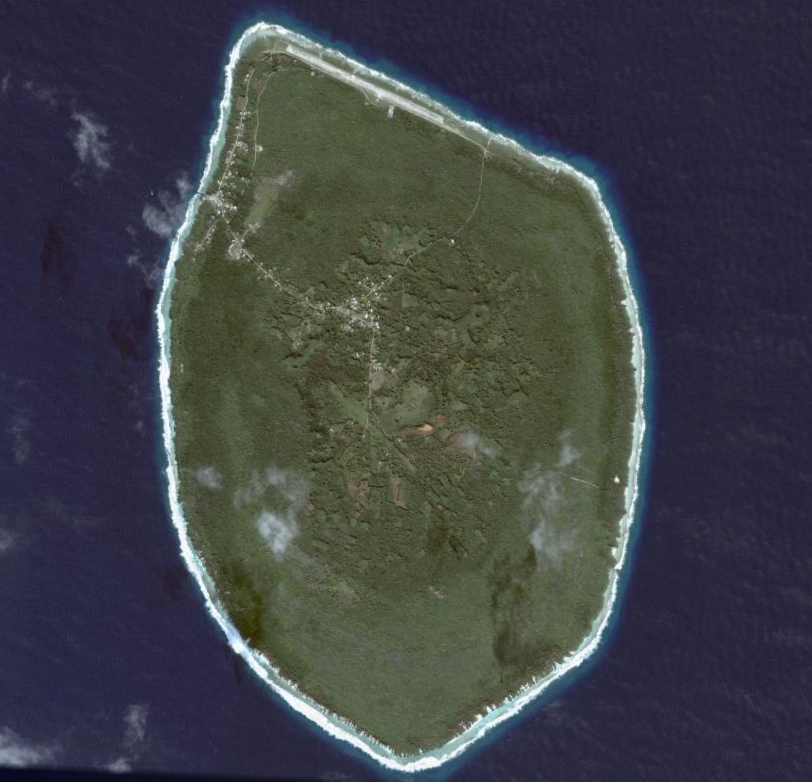
Mauke

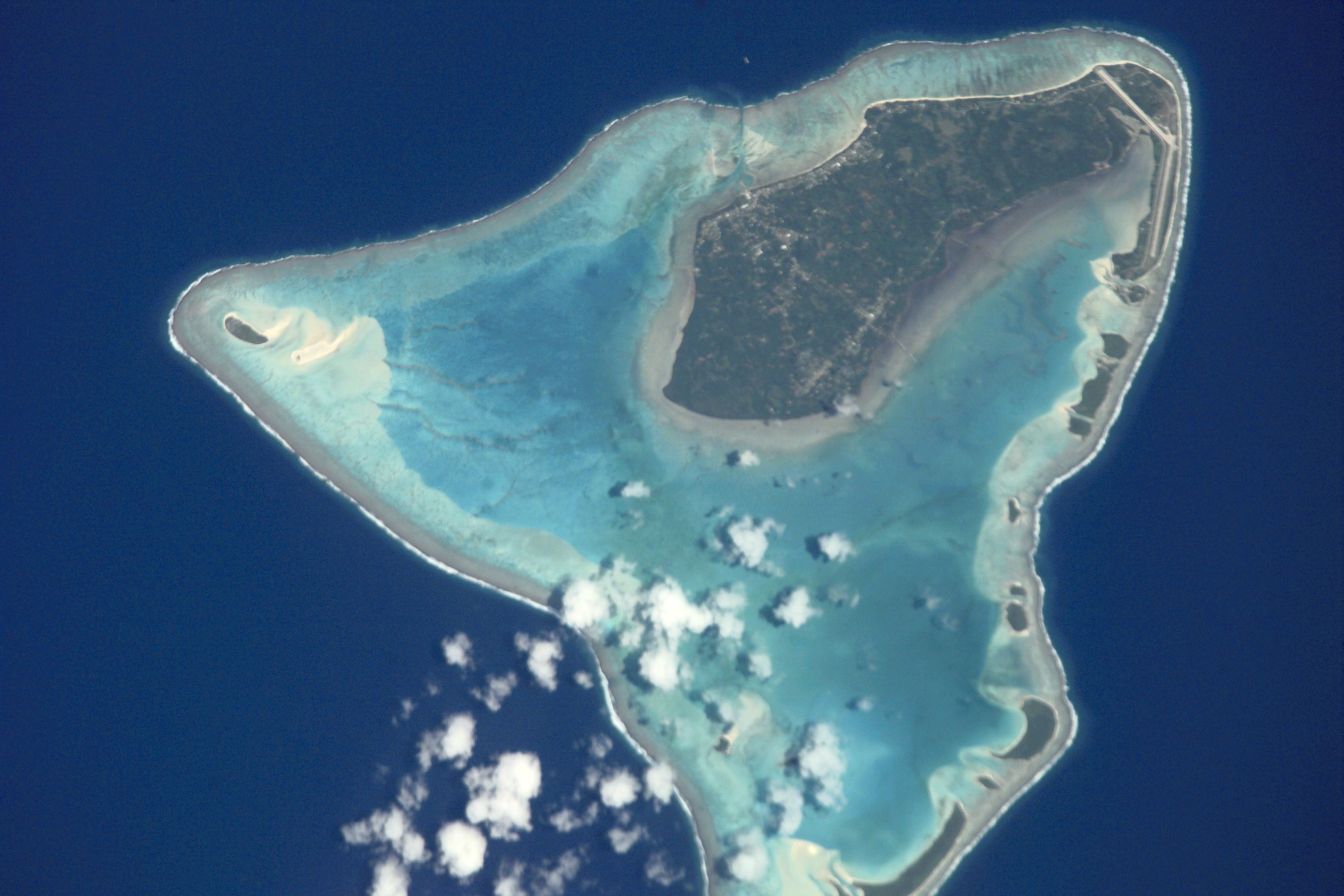
Aitutaki

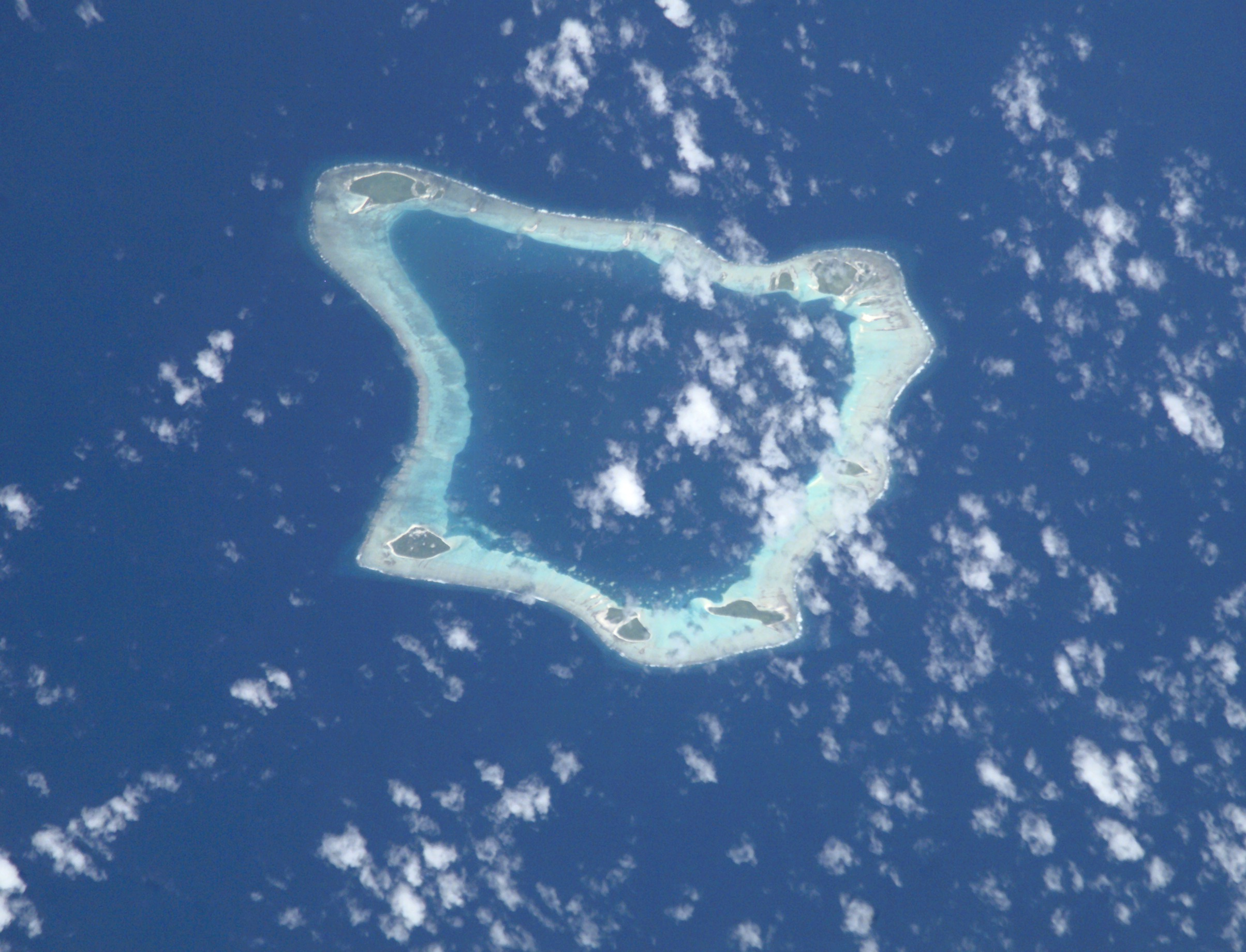
Palmerston Atoll

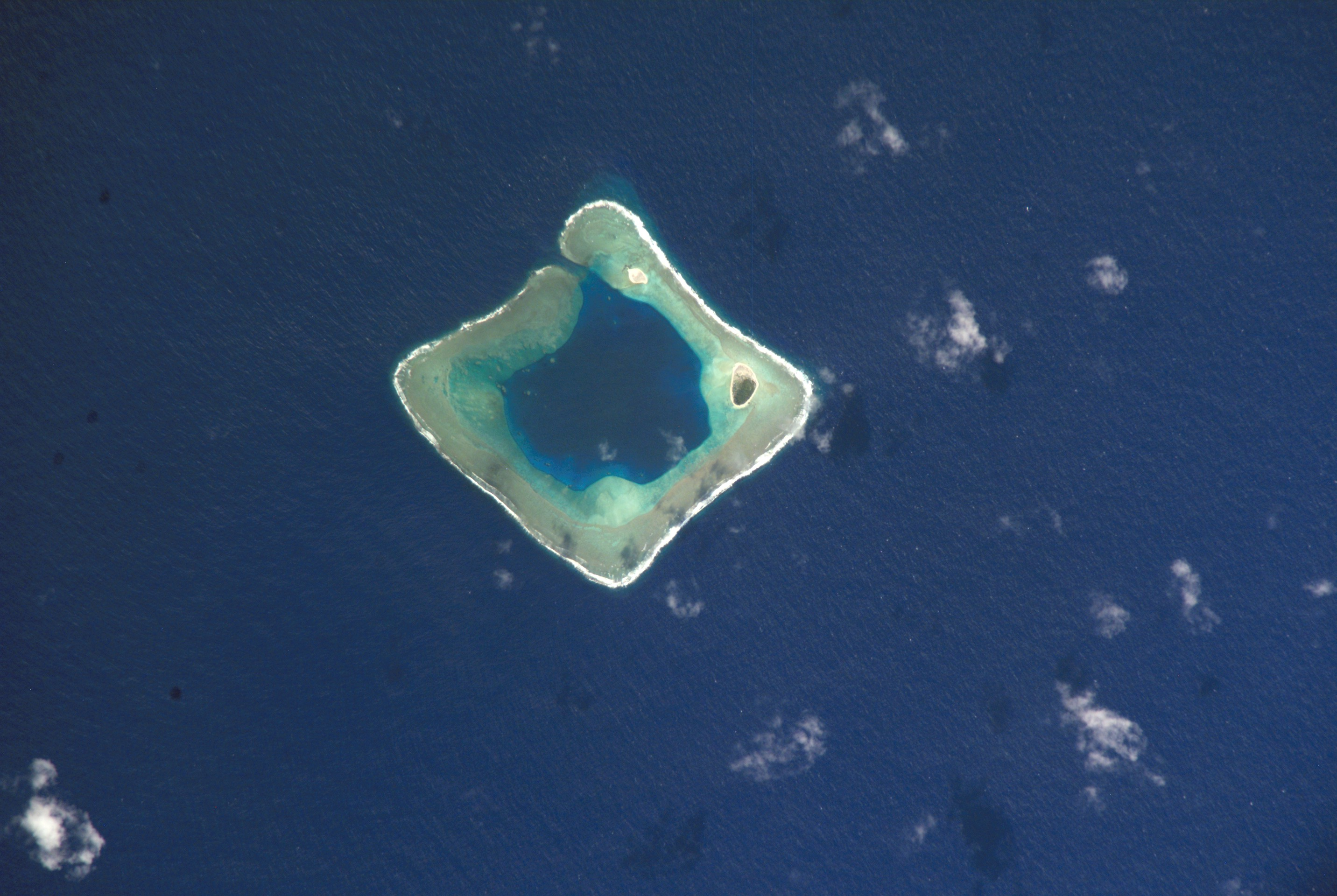
Rose Atoll

Tuvalu

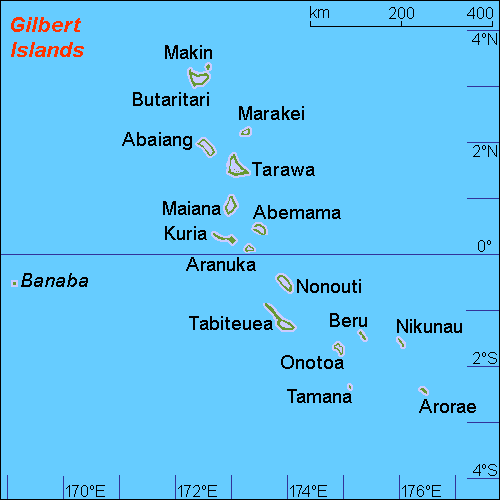
Gilbert Islands

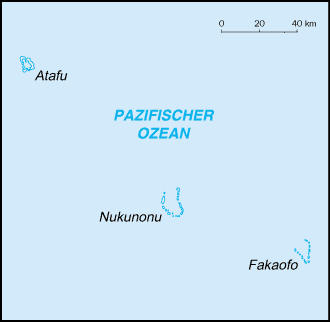
Tokelau

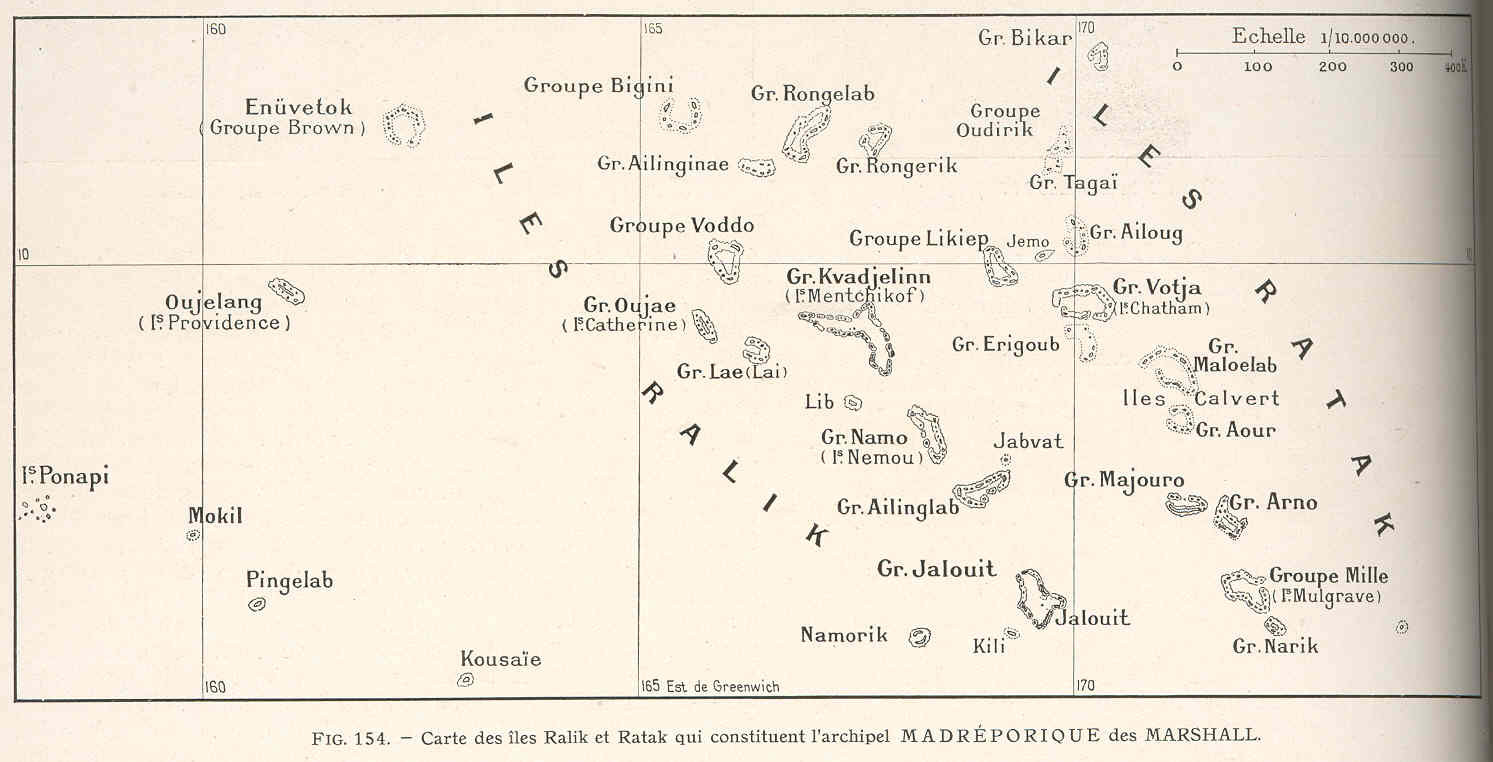
Ratak chain

Seamounts of the Marshall Islands

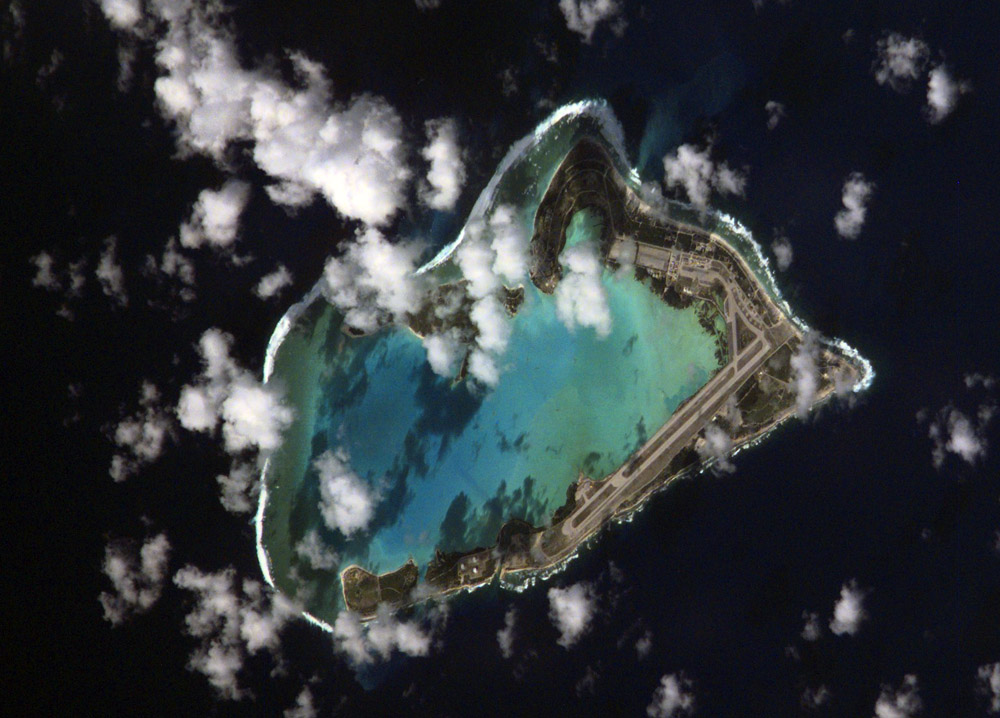
Wake Island
