= Macdonald hotspot =

Volcanic hotspot in the southern Pacific Ocean

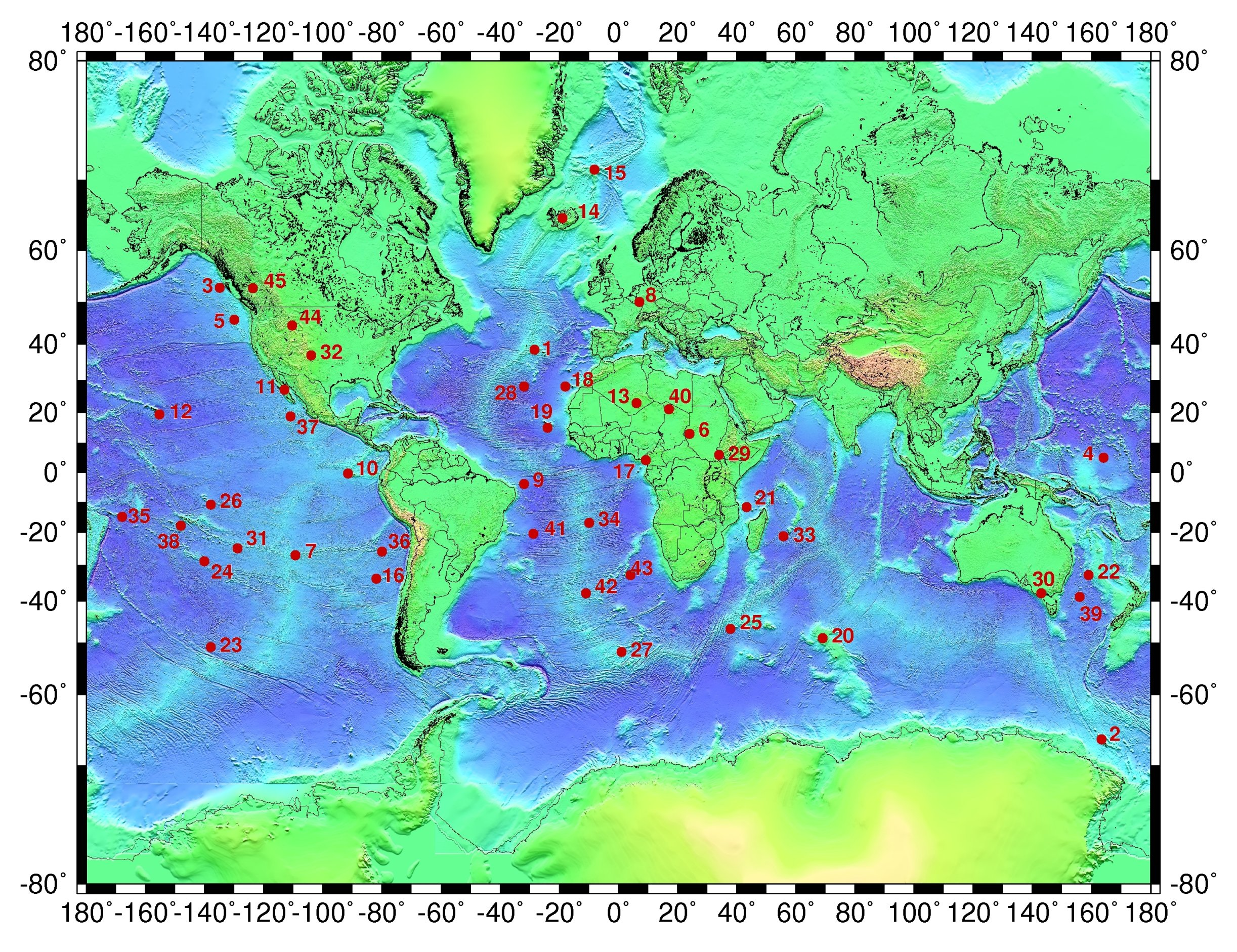
The Macdonald hotspot is in the Pacific Ocean, marked 24 on this map.

The approximate current location of Macdonald hotspot is the Macdonald seamount superimposed on the seafloor height abnormality modelled for the South Pacific superswell Legend: Key for the depth anomaly: 0 meters or more; 250 meters or more; 500 meters or more

.

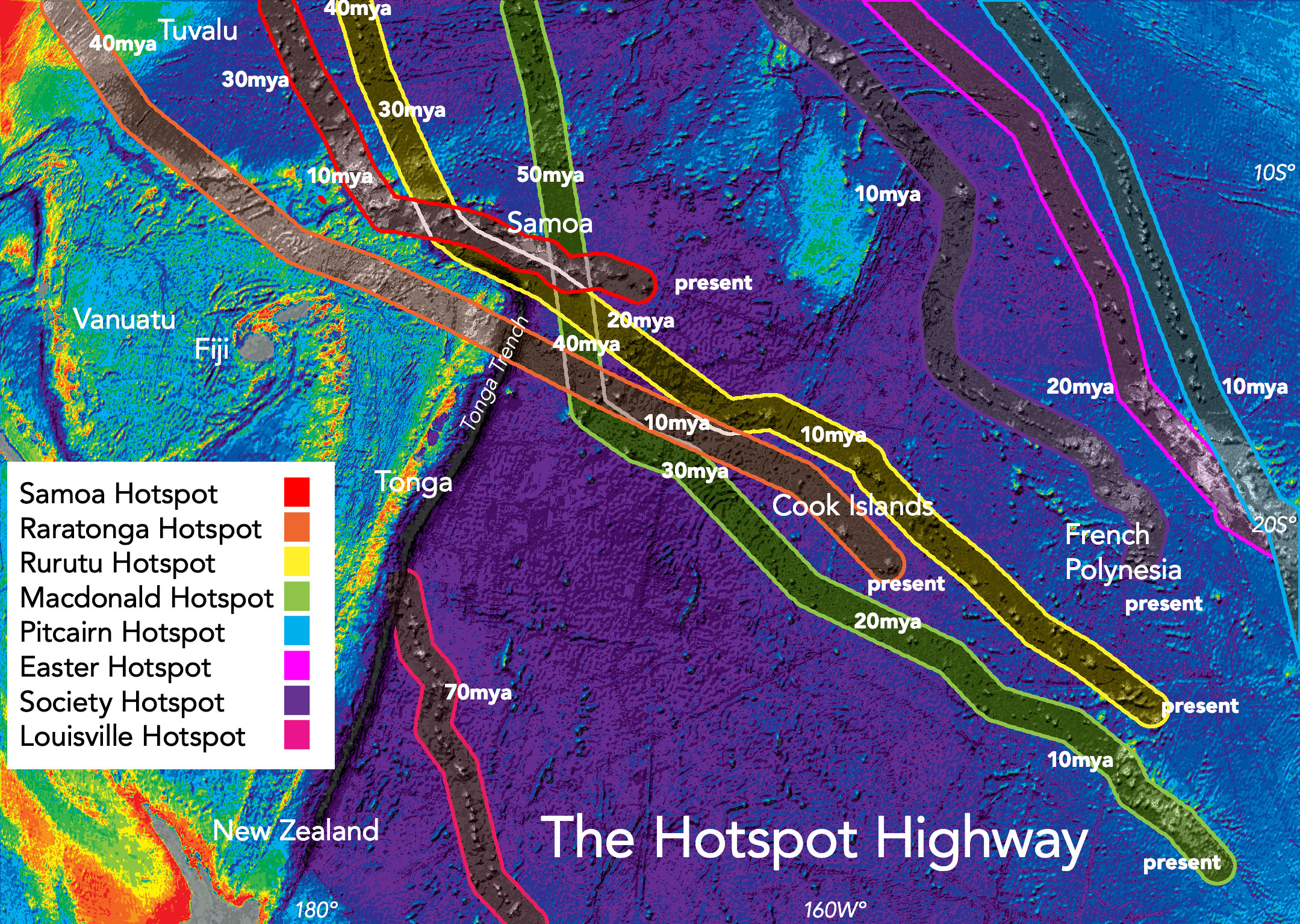
The Macdonald hotspot has been grouped into the Pacific Ocean's Hotspot highway

The Macdonald hotspot (also known as "Tubuai" or "Old Rurutu") is a volcanic hotspot in the southern Pacific Ocean. The hotspot was responsible for the formation of the Macdonald Seamount, and possibly the Austral-Cook Islands chain. It probably did not generate all of the volcanism in the Austral and Cook Islands as age data imply that several additional hotspots were needed to generate some volcanoes.

In addition to the volcanoes in the Austral Islands and Cook Islands, Tokelau, the Gilbert Islands, the Phoenix Islands and several of the Marshall Islands as well as several seamounts in the Marshall Islands may have been formed by the Macdonald hotspot.

== Geology ==
=== Regional geology ===
Hotspots have been explained either by mantle plumes producing magma in the crust, reactivation of old lithospheric structures such as fractures or spreading of the crust through tectonic tension. Aside from Macdonald seamount, active volcanoes which are considered hotspots in the Pacific Ocean include Hawaii, Bounty seamount at Pitcairn, Vailulu'u in Samoa and Mehetia/Teahitia in the Society Islands.

Volcanism in the southern Pacific Ocean has been associated with the "South Pacific superswell", a region where the seafloor is abnormally shallow. It is the site of a number of often short-lived volcanic chains, including the previously mentioned hotspots as well as the Arago hotspot, Marquesas Islands and Rarotonga. Beneath the superswell, a region of upwelling has been identified in the mantle, although the scarcity of seismic stations in the regions made it initially difficult to reliably image it. In the case of Macdonald, it seems like a low velocity anomaly in the mantle rises from another anomaly at 1,200 kilometres (750 mi) depth to the surface. This has been explained by the presence of a "superplume", a very large mantle plume which also formed oceanic plateaus during the Cretaceous, with present-day volcanism at the Society and Macdonald volcanoes originating from secondary plumes that rise from the superplume to the crust. Later work after the establishment of a local seismic network allowed P wave studies confirming that the South Pacific superswell is linked to the Macdonald hotspot at top of its superplume at 400–500 km (250–310 mi) depth. The association may also explain the Hotspot highway of the South Pacific Ocean first described in 2010. An ultra-low velocity zone under Pitcairn extends to the Easter hotspot and the Macdonald hotspot.

=== Local geology ===
The Austral Islands and the Cook Islands may have been formed by the Macdonald hotspot, as the Pacific plate was carried above the hotspot at a rate of 10–11 centimetres per year (3.9–4.3 in/year). A 500–300 metres (1,640–980 ft) high swell underpins the Austral Islands as far as Macdonald seamount, which is the presently active volcano on the Macdonald hotspot. They fit the pattern of linear volcanism, seeing as they are progressively less degraded southeastward (with the exception of Marotiri, which unprotected by coral reefs unlike the other more equatorial islands has been heavily eroded) and the active Macdonald volcano lies at their southeastern end. However, there appear to be somewhat older guyots in the area as well, some of which show evidence that secondary volcanoes formed on them. It is possible that the guyots are much older and that lithospheric anomalies were periodically reactivated and triggered renewed volcanism on the older guyots.

In addition, dating of the various volcanoes in the Cook-Austral chain indicates that there is no simple age progression away from Macdonald seamount and that the chain appears to consist of two separate alignments. While the younger ages of Atiu and Aitutaki may be explained by the long-range effect of Rarotonga's growth, Rarotonga itself is about 18–19 million years younger than would be expected if it was formed by Macdonald. Additional younger ages in some volcanoes such as Rurutu have been explained by the presence of an additional system, the Arago hotspot, and some rocks from Tubuai and Raivavae as well as deeper samples taken on other volcanoes appear to be too old to be explained by the Macdonald hotspot. These ages may indicate that some volcanoes were originally formed by the Foundation hotspot. Other problems with using a hotspot to explain this volcanism is the highly variable composition of volcanism between various edifices, and that a number of Cook Islands are not located on the reconstructed path of the Macdonald hotspot. Some of these discrepancies may be due to the presence of multiple hotspots or the reactivation of dead volcanism by the passage nearby of another hotspot.

The high ratio of helium-3 to helium-4 has been used to infer a deep mantle origin of magmas of hotspot volcanoes. Helium samples taken from Macdonald support the contention and have been used to rule out the notion that such magmas may be derived from the crust, although an origin in primitive-helium-enriched sectors of the lithosphere is possible. Seismic tomography has depicted a mantle plume underneath the Macdonald hotspot.

=== Candidate edifices ===
The hotspot may have been active for 70 million years (exceeded by the Arago hotspot), possibly forming volcanoes like:

- Macdonald seamount.
- Rá seamount is located on the path of Macdonald but is too old to have been formed by this hotspot.
- Marotiri, Rapa, Raivavae, Tubuai and the older volcanics of Rurutu and of the Arago seamount, and the correlation is in part supported by isotope data, although a change in isotopic composition between Raivavae and Rapa appears to have occurred, possibly as a consequence of the hotspot crossing the Austral fracture zone. Older ages at Marotiri may indicate a separate volcanic event, generated by the same source as Rá seamount.
- ZEP2-7 seamount near Rurutu.
- The Neilson Bank is on the path of Macdonald, but the only age is much older than predicted and of questionable accuracy.
- ZEP2-19 seamount may be 8.8 million years old.
- Mangaia.
- Rarotonga during the Oligocene but with more recent volcanism as well.
- Rose Atoll and Malulu seamount in Samoa, if they are about 40 million years old. Moki, Dino and Malulu seamounts are more plausible products of the Macdonald hotspot, as Rose Atoll has been linked to the Arago hotspot instead, and Moki has an appropriate composition. Malulu and Papatua may have been formed either by the Macdonald hotspot or the Arago hotspot.
- Tokelau, based on plate reconstructions and isotope data.
- Gilbert Islands, although such a track would require a bend in the path of the hotspot. A bend exists in the Hawaii-Emperor seamount chain but whether one exists at Macdonald is unclear. It is predicted to occur close to where the Samoa hotspot is today.
- Phoenix Islands, 43–66 million years ago.
- The northern Marshall Islands were above the Macdonald hotspot 100–150 million years ago. Later some of these seamounts and atolls were influenced by the Rurutu hotspot, the Society hotspot and the Rarotonga hotspot leading to a complex history of volcanism and uplift.
  - The guyot Aean-Kan during the mid-Cretaceous.
  - The northern Ralik Chain may also have been formed by the Macdonald hotspot, although uncertainties in plate motions from before about 90 million years ago make any such reconstruction uncertain.
  - Erikub Atoll, although Arago hotspot passed even closer to Erikub.
  - Late Cretaceous volcanism of Lokkworkwor and Lomjenaelik seamounts.
  - Aptian-Albian volcanism at Lobbadede and Lewa guyots, followed by renewed activity at Lobbadede 82.4 million years ago probably linked to the Rurutu hotspot.
  - Lo-En seamount during the Albian.
  - Aptian-Albian volcanism at Wōdejebato and Ruwitūntūn seamounts. Later these seamounts were further affected by the Rurutu hotspot, at the same time as volcanism occurred at Bikini and Rongelap.
- The Magellan Seamounts may have been influenced by magmas and melts ascending from the Macdonald and other hotspots of the South Pacific. In particular, Ita Mai Tai has compositions resembling the Rarotonga and (to a lesser degree) Macdonald hotspot.

== See also ==
- Arago hotspot
