= Rarotonga hotspot =

Volcanic hotspot in the southern Pacific Ocean

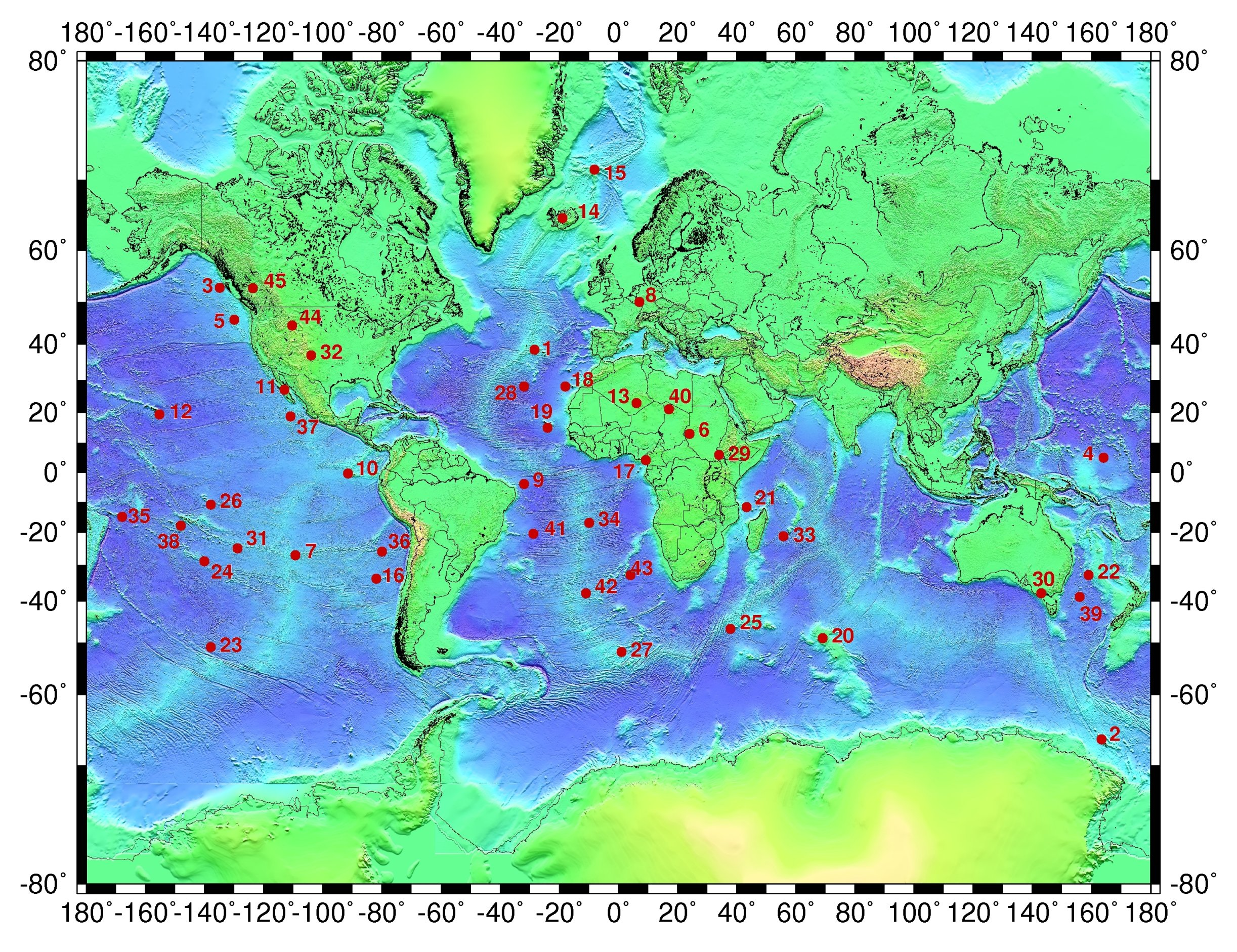
The Rarotonga hotspot is in the Pacific Ocean, between the points 24 and 35 in this map.

The Rarotonga hotspot is a volcanic hotspot in the southern Pacific Ocean. The hotspot is claimed to be responsible for the formation of Rarotonga and some volcanics of Aitutaki but an alternative explanation for these islands most recent volcanics has not been ruled out. Recently alternatives to hotspot activity have been offered for several other intra-plate volcanoes that may have been associated with the Rarotonga hotspot hypothesis.

In addition to these volcanoes in the Cook Islands, the composition of volcanic rocks in Samoa and in the Lau Basin may have been influenced by the Rarotonga hotspot, and some atolls and seamounts in the Marshall Islands may have formed on the hotspot as well.

== Geology ==
Oceanic plateaus and linear volcanic chains dot the floor of the Pacific Ocean. Their formation has been explained with mantle plumes which rise from the core-mantle boundary and spread out when they rise, forming a large "head" that causes intense volcanic activity once it hits the crust. This volcanism is responsible for the formation of the oceanic plateaus. Later, the remnant "tail" of the plume is still rising and induces the formation of volcano chains as the crust moves over the plume tail, thus forming the linear chains of hot spots. As there is growing evidence that not all intra-plate volcanoes are generated by upwelling mantle plumes, not all may be formed from hot spots.

A number of hotspots are or were active in the Pacific Ocean and some of these may be the product of mantle plumes. Other hotspots such as Rarotonga appear to have been active only for short time periods; many of these are located in French Polynesia and may be related to the South Pacific superswell. Such hotspot volcanism may be the product of shallow processes. Research has suggested that the Macdonald hotspot, and the Rurutu hotspot are long lived hotspots that were active as far back as the Cretaceous; so they may be over 100 million years old and in such case the oldest still active hotspots in the Pacific. The Rarotonga hotspot may also be very old but the evidence is less convincing; it is also possible that the "Rarotonga hotspot" is simply rejuvenated volcanism linked to a different hotspot. These three hotspots may have built the Cook-Austral Islands together, resulting in overlapping ages of the volcanoes. A gap between 60-50 million years ago may have been caused by the Ontong Java Plateau burying the hotspot.

Seismic tomography has found slow velocity anomalies underneath Rarotonga, down to depths of about 100 kilometres (62 mi) with more recent research indicating that they root at about 1,000 kilometres (620 mi) depth. The anomaly lies at over 80 kilometres (50 mi) depth with no evidence of shallower anomalies, however. The Rarotonga volcanic source and other regional hotspots appear to be anchored to a deep mantle structure that is one of the large low-shear-velocity provinces (superplumes). It is one of four (the others being the Marquesas, Pitcairn and Society hotspots) Pacific hotspots with the so-called "EM" chemical signature.

== Products ==
The Rarotonga hotspot is linked only to the formation of Rarotonga and to volcanism on Aitutaki, as potential volcanic structures between the Tonga Trench and Rarotonga that may have been formed by the same hotspot are poorly studied. Rarotonga itself is young but there is little indication of volcanism either southeast or northwest from it and no evidence of its current position.

Other candidate volcanoes/structures formed by the Rarotonga hotspot or influenced by it are:

- Rarotonga.
- The young volcanics of Aitutaki. An origin of the young volcanics as rejuvenated volcanism cannot be ruled out, however.
- Rose Atoll and Malulu Seamount may have been formed by the Rarotonga hotspot, but other hotspots are also candidates. The connection to Rarotonga is supported by geochemical traits.
- Uo Mamae seamount in Samoa share geochemical traits with the Rarotonga hotspot and plate motion reconstructions indicate that the hotspot track passed through it. Potentially, the hotspot formed Uo Mamae and local tectonic processes later (940,000 years ago) triggered rejuvenated volcanism.
- The composition of rejuvenated volcanism in Samoa may bear traces of the influence of the Rarotonga hotspot, which passed across Samoa in the past.
- Reconstructions of the path of the Rarotonga hotspot imply that part of its output was subducted into the Tonga Trench; back-arc magmas may thus ended up entraining material formerly produced by the Rarotonga hotspot. Backarc volcanic rocks in the Lau Basin bear traces of such influence.
- Nauru and a small seamount nearby.
- The Marshall Islands underwent vigorous volcanic and geological activity while they passed over the Rarotonga hotspot and neighbouring hotspots.
  - Geochemical traits and plate reconstruction links the Ralik Chain to the Rarotonga hotspot less than 80 million years ago, specifically the northern Ralik.
  - Limalok guyot was close to the Rarotonga and Rurutu hotspots 62 million years ago. The plate reconstructions point towards Rurutu being the origin of Limalok, while geochemical traits match Rarotonga best.
  - Lo-En guyot was within the influence of the Rarotonga hotspot between 85 and 74 million years ago; if volcanic activity occurred during that time it may be owing to the effect of this hotspot. There is evidence of Campanian volcanic activity
  - Eniwetok was located close to the Rarotonga hotspot about 76.9 million years ago; this date corresponds to the a radiometric age obtained on the upper volcano.
  - A cluster of volcanoes close to Eniwetok and Ujlan may be the product of the Rarotonga hotspot.
  - Volcanic activity at Wōdejebato coincides with a period where the Rarotonga hotspot, the Rurutu hotspot and the Tahiti hotspot were all three located close to the seamount.
- Geochemical traits and plate reconstruction links the Magellan Seamounts to the Rarotonga hotspot less than 80 million years ago although other hotspots also played a role - in particular, mantle previously altered by the Arago hotspot such as at Pako Guyot. However the Cretaceous intraplate volcanism in the Magellan guyots can be explained by either plume activity or decompression partial melting of oceanic lithosphere caused by Pacific Plate deformation and fracturing from the Lithosphere-Asthenosphere Boundary (LAB) level. Some volcanoes may have formed from magma derived from the Rarotonga hotspot, but then channelled to some distance from the actual plume.
- The Western Pacific Seamount Province has been argued to be the Cretaceous path of the Rarotonga hotspot, but its older members appear to be offset slightly north of the reconstructed path. Some seamounts on the reconstructed path of the Rarotonga hotspot share geochemical traits with the hotspot, but with different lead isotope ratios. However to date there is evidence for at least two formation hypotheses in this area being volcanics derived from partial melting of secondary plume clusters emanating from the top of mantle plumes trapped at the mantle transition zone or secondary plumelets emanating from the top of the Pacific large low shear velocity province (LLSVP).
- Hemler Guyot has similar isotope ratios as Rarotonga and its reconstructed position match those of the Rarotonga hotspot although some lateral flow of magma may be required to explain its position and that of several other Magellan Seamounts.
