= MIT Guyot =

Guyot in the Pacific Ocean

Coordinates: 27°17.17′N 151°49.39′E

Location in the Marshall Islands

MIT Guyot is a guyot in the Pacific Ocean that rises to a depth of 1,323 metres (4,341 ft). It has a 20-kilometre-long (12 mi) summit platform and formed during the Cretaceous in the region of present-day French Polynesia through volcanic eruptions.

The volcano was eventually covered by a carbonate platform resembling that of a present-day atoll which was colonized by a number of animals. A major volcanic episode disrupted this platform, which subsequently redeveloped until it drowned in the late Albian.

== Name and research history ==
MIT means Massachusetts Institute of Technology. Drilling in MIT Guyot recovered about 185 metres (607 ft) of basaltic rocks as part of the Ocean Drilling Program which targeted MIT along with four other guyots of the Pacific Ocean.

== Geography and geology ==
=== Local setting ===
The seamount lies in the Western Pacific Ocean northwest of Marcus Island and about halfway between Japan and the Marshall Islands. The Marcus-Wake Seamounts lie nearby, but MIT Guyot is a more isolated volcanic edifice that is sometimes considered to be a member of the Japanese Seamounts. The crust beneath the seamount is 160 million years old and the Kashima fracture zone passes southwest from MIT Guyot.

MIT Guyot rises from a depth of 6,100 metres (20,000 ft) to 1,390 metres (4,560 ft) below sea level, although drill cores have been taken from depths of 1,323 metres (4,341 ft). The seamount is over 20 kilometres (12 mi) long and 2–6 kilometres (1.2–3.7 mi) wide, widening southwestwards. It has a flat top at a depth of 1,400 metres (4,600 ft) and has been described as a sunken atoll, with a relief of about 100 metres (330 ft). Karst features occur on the seamount and are up to 200 metres (660 ft) deep, including dolines and sinkholes. The outer slopes of MIT Guyot are steep, a typical trait for guyot slopes.

=== Regional setting ===
A number of seamounts occur in the Western Pacific Ocean which often form lines and groups and have the appearance of drowned atolls, with flat tops at depths of 1–2 kilometres (0.62–1.24 mi) below sea level. They often appear to be shallower than would be expected from plate tectonics and the normal thermal subsidence of the oceanic crust. Their formation has been explained by hotspot volcanism in the region of present-day French Polynesia although many of them do not appear to have originated from simple hotspot mechanisms. These seamounts are considered to be part of the Darwin Rise, which includes MIT.

About five different hotspots were active in French Polynesia within the last twenty million years. Formation of the MIT Guyot has been linked to the Tahiti hotspot. However, linking specific seamounts to specific hotspots runs into difficulties when the linkage between one hotspot-seamount pair involves a mismatch between another hotspot-seamount pair.

=== Composition ===
MIT Guyot has erupted basaltic rocks, with rock composition changing over time from alkali basalts over basanite to hawaiite. Phenocryst phases include clinopyroxene, olivine and plagioclase, and apatite, augite and pyroxene are additional components. Isotope ratios resemble these of the northern Wake seamounts and of the Marquesas hotspot.

Alteration of basalts has given rise to clay, chlorite, goethite, hematite, hydromica, kaolinite and especially smectite but also zeolite. Palagonite and sideromelane have been found in some samples. Clays contain pyrite. Carbonates include both bindstone, grainstone, packstone and wackestone with subordinate rudstone. Some carbonate sediments take the form of ooids, peloids and pisoids or contain vuggy porosities.

== Geologic history ==
MIT Guyot formed during the Cretaceous about 123 million years ago. Based on paleomagnetic data, the seamount formed at a latitude of 11.5 ± 2.3 degrees south and is at least 118 million years old. A paleolatitude of 32.8 degrees south may also be possible and would be consistent with that of the Macdonald hotspot.

=== First volcanism ===
Argon–argon dating has yielded ages of 119.6–124 million years for volcanic rocks taken from MIT Guyot. There appear to have been three separate volcanic episodes which generated three sets of volcanic rocks with different composition. Basaltic lava flows form stacks that were emplaced one on top of another and on top of other types of volcanic deposits. The flows are often separated by weathered layers. A 9.6 metres (31 ft) thick soil developed on these lava flows; the soil was probably removed by erosion such as wave action in some places.

=== Carbonate platform and late volcanism ===
During the Aptian, a carbonate platform started developing on the exposed volcanic rocks of MIT. It developed in marine settings and formed two 118 metres (387 ft) and 396 metres (1,299 ft) thick carbonate layers continuing into the Albian, the two layers being separated by a 204 metres (669 ft) thick volcanic succession. The carbonate platform probably started out as a fringing reef or barrier reef with the sole drill core from MIT indicating a delay of about 1-2 million years between the end of volcanism and the beginning of platform growth, and at least seven different stages of sea level rise have been recognized. The total lifespan of the active carbonate platform is about 19 million years.

The MIT Guyot platform was characterized by the presence of both a carbonate platform and an atoll-like structure with lagoonal structures that were progressively filled with sands, some of which were of biogenic origin. The lagoonal structure was affected by a secondary volcanic event but continued shallowing afterwards. Elsewhere bioherms as well as patch reef like structures evolved and sandy shoals rimmed the lagoon. Shallow muddy environments developed in some places of the platform, including freshwater areas where charophytes developed. However, there is no evidence that the carbonate platform of MIT featured vegetation at that time.

Some algae (Note: Among the algae genera found on MIT are Acroporella, Boueina, Cylindroporella, Montiella, Parachaetetes, Polystrata, Salpingoporella, Similiclypeina, Solenopora, Suppiluliumaella and Triploporella.) and foraminifera (Note: Among the foraminifera genera found on MIT are Ammobaculites, Arenobulimina, Axiopolina, Bdelloidina, Coskinolinella, Cuneolina, Daxia, Debarina, Lituola, Neotrocholina, Nezzazata, Novalesia, Orbitolina, Pseudonummoloculina, Praechrysalidina, Sabaudia, Tubiphytes, Valvulineria, Vercorsella and Voloshinoides.) lived on the MIT Guyot platform, the former were the source of rhodoliths. The algae are warm water shallow sea genera, reflecting warm waters at MIT when it was a carbonate platform. Storm activity led to the redeposition of carbonate sediments, forming shoals.

Various animals have been identified in the carbonate deposit as well, they inhabited the platform when it was still active. These include bivalves, bryozoans, corals, echinoids, gastropods, ostracods, oysters, rudists, sponges and stromatoporoids. Additionally, crustacean coproliths have been dredged from the seamount.

Renewed volcanic activity took place after the start of carbonate deposition, perhaps separated from the previous volcanic episodes by about 4 million years, leading to eruptions through the carbonate platform. After a prelude characterized by the deposition of several ash layers, two major explosive eruptions shook the platform The late volcanic activity at MIT took place underwater, forming pyroclastic material including lapilli and tephra but also reworked carbonate material. Also, tuffs and volcanic ash layers were emplaced. The eruption may have started as a phreatomagmatic eruption when water within a lagoon or within pores of the carbonate platform interacted with the rising magma. The eruption formed an eruption column and a crater within the carbonate platform that was subsequently filled by other eruption products. It is likely that this volcanic activity caused the formation of a volcanic island above the carbonate platform.

=== Drowning and later evolution ===
Growth of the carbonate platform ceased during the late Albian. Such a drowning process has been observed at other Pacific guyots such as Takuyo-Daisan, Limalok and Wōdejebato at different times and appears to occur for a multitude of reasons. One of these is a brief period of emergence of the carbonate platform which reduces the space available for carbonate-producing organisms and thus their carbonate production rate until it can no longer compete with sea level rises. Another factor is an increasingly unfavourable environment as the platforms approach the equator; all these platforms drowned as they approached the equator perhaps owing to excessively hot waters and too many nutrients that favour the growth of algae; such algal growth is found in the last carbonates deposited at MIT. In the case of MIT, the platform underwent a temporary uplift before drowning.

A pelagic cap has formed on MIT but is rather thin, only 3.2 metres (10 ft) of material have accumulated and that mainly in surface depressions. It includes manganese crusts (Note: Containing asbolane, buserite and vernadite minerals.) which were emplaced over the 95 million years that lapsed between the drowning of the platform and the Miocene, when pelagic sedimentation commenced at MIT. Three different phases of pelagic sedimentation during the Miocene-Pliocene, Pliocene and Pleistocene have been found.
