= Takuyo-Daisan =

Guyot in the Western Pacific Ocean off Japan

- Takuyo-Daisan (Oceania) Location offshore Japan
- Location offshore Japan
- Summit depth: 1,409 m (4,623 ft)

Location
- Location: Western Pacific Ocean
- Group: Japanese Seamounts
- Coordinates: 34.2°N 144.3°E
- Country: Japan

Geology
- Type: Guyot
- Age of rock: Cretaceous
- Last activity: Aptian

Takuyo-Daisan is a guyot in the Western Pacific Ocean off Japan. It is 1,409 metres (4,623 ft) deep and has a square-shaped flat top surrounded by a perimeter ridge. Several other seamounts lie nearby.

The seamount formed as a volcanic island during the Cretaceous in the area currently occupied by French Polynesia. Subsequently reefs developed around the volcanic island and generated a carbonate platform which drowned during the Albian along with several other such platforms in the world.

== Name and research history ==
Takuyo-Daisan was formerly known as "Seiko guyot"; "Seiko guyot" was used even earlier for Takuyo-Daini while Takuyo-Daisan was named "Eiko". This seamount was drilled by the Ocean Drilling Program, with Site 879 located on the seamount.

== Geography and geology ==
Takuyo-Daisan lies southeast of the city of Yokohama, Japan. It is the easternmost seamount in the "Seiko" cluster of the Japanese Seamounts. The Boso triple junction lies only 200 kilometres (120 mi) away from the seamount.

=== Local ===
Takuyo-Daisan is a guyot that rises to a minimum depth of 1,409 metres (4,623 ft) and is capped by an approximately square-shaped surface platform at about 1,600 metres (5,200 ft) depth which has a surface area of about 86 square kilometres (33 sq mi). Depressions up to 75 metres (246 ft) deep cover the flat top. The top is surrounded by a 0.6–1 kilometre (0.37–0.62 mi) wide and up to 110 metres (360 ft) high ridge, especially on the northeastern and southern sides. It may be either a bioherm or a karst landform. A 100 metres (330 ft)-110 metres (360 ft) high structure may be part of the old volcanic edifice; the interface between the carbonate platform and the volcanic basement has a sloping aspect.

Away from the platform, the seamount has steep slopes probably formed by short lava flows that rise 4.3 kilometres (2.7 mi) above the seafloor. Channels, debris flow fronts and levees decorate its slopes. Noticeable ridges emanate from the east-southeastern, southwestern, west-northwestern and north-northeastern corners of the seamount; they appear to be rift zones, and flank cones are found on the eastern slopes. The southern slopes feature slump deposits, and the entire seamount is surrounded by a sediment fan. The volume of the entire seamount is about 1,300 cubic kilometres (310 cu mi). Two large seamounts lie west and southwest of Takuyo-Daisan with a smaller seamount between the two; Takuyo-Daini is the western one and Jensen seamount the south-western one. The seafloor underneath Takuyo-Daisan has an age of 143 million years.

=== Regional ===
The Western Pacific Ocean features many seamounts with flat tops at depths of 1–2 kilometres (0.62–1.24 mi) below sea level which are known as guyots. They were considered to be remnants of eroded islands before Cretaceous carbonate platforms were discovered on them which resemble present-day atolls although they do not have exactly the same properties. Later similar submarine mountains were identified elsewhere in the Pacific Ocean as well. Menard 1958 suggested that the Western Pacific guyots once were part of an elevated region known as the Darwin Rise, later compared to present day French Polynesia.

Many of these seamounts originally formed in the South Pacific, such as in French Polynesia, where a number of recent volcanoes and volcanic chains can be found. The original location of Takuyo-Daisan closely matches the present-day location of the Society hotspot, and together with Takuyo-Daini, Winterer Guyot and Isakov Guyot appears to form a linear volcanic chain, the Geisha guyots.

=== Composition ===
Takuyo-Daisan has erupted basalt containing olivine and plagioclase and which define an intermediary to tholeiitic magma suite. Weathering of volcanic rocks has given rise to calcite, clay which also contains coal, iddingsite and zeolite. Carbonates occur in the form of floatstone, grainstone, limestone, packstone, oncoids, peloids, rudstone and wackestone; the limestone is of reefal origin. Hypersthene andesite samples taken from Takuyo-Daisan were probably brought there by ice rafting as no such rocks have ever been found on this kind of volcanic island.

== Geologic history ==
=== Volcanism ===
Obtaining reliable radiometric ages from Takuyo-Daisan has been difficult; the most reliable age has been obtained from nearby Takuyo-Daini, 118.4 ± 1.8 million years ago. From this date an age of 119.0 ± 1.8 million years ago has been inferred for Takuyo-Daisan. A more recent date from Takuyo-Daisan is 117.5 ± 1.1 million years ago. The seamount formed at 9-7 degrees south from the equator.

Volcanic activity formed breccia, lava flows with thicknesses of about 1 metre (3 ft 3 in) and volcanic sediments. The volcanic rocks were subject to weathering, forming over 20 metres (66 ft) thick soils. Phreatomagmatic deposits and rocks interpreted as peperite have also been found, implying that some lava flows may have interacted with wet soils as they were emplaced. Takuyo-Daisan at this time might have been an at least 138 metres (453 ft) and possibly as much as 900 metres (3,000 ft) high tropical volcanic island with marshes that were inhabited by bioturbatory organisms.

=== Carbonate sedimentation ===
Carbonate sedimentation at Takyuo-Daisan lasted from the Aptian to the Albian (based on foraminiferal fossils) and led to the deposition of about 150 metres (490 ft)-200 metres (660 ft) of carbonate sediment. Carbonate sedimentation took place while the initial volcanic edifice was still emergent, similar to present-day Truk, Micronesia; this resulted in terrigenous sedimentation in the carbonates. The total duration of carbonate sedimentation is about 15 million years, 3 metres (9.8 ft) thick distinct sequences in the carbonate sediments may be correlated to Milankovich cycles.

The carbonate platform at Takuyo-Daisan featured both barrier shoals and lagoonal environments. Biogenic mounds grew at the margin of the platform. Redeposition of carbonate sediments led to the formation of sandy shoals which formed the later perimeter ridge. Overall the environment of the platform was a warm Tethyan environment.

Algae (Note: Such as Marinella, Neomeris, Pycnoporidium, Terquemella and Zittelina.) including algal mats, bivalves, corals, cyanobacteria, echinoids, foraminifera, (Note: Genera include Arenobulimina, Axiopolina, Bdelloidina, Cuneolina, Daxia, Debarina, Fischerina, Istriloculina, Lituola, Nezzazata, Novalesia, Orbitolina, Paracoskinolina, Trocholina, and Vercorsella.) molluscs, nannofossil-forming species and rudists inhabited the carbonate platform, and arthropods and woods have been found in the oldest carbonate deposits. The fauna of Takuyo-Daisan was not particularly diverse, probably because the seamount was located close to the paleoequator and away from the Tethyan margin that many species found at Takuyo-Daisan originate from.

=== Drowning and post-drowning evolution ===
The drowning of the carbonate platform at Takuyo-Daisan has been attributed to different causes. A large transgression took place in the late Albian and may have caused the drowning. In other guyots nutrient excess has been implicated but there is no evidence of such at Takuyo-Daisan. Other factors may include hostile conditions close to the equator and unfavourable changes of the geomorphology of the platform at the time of its drowning. The drowning of the Takuyo-Daisan platform was simultaneous to the drowning of carbonate platforms elsewhere around the world and may have been caused by tectonically-induced sea level fluctuations.

After cessation of the platform activity, manganese crusts and chalks later modified by phosphate developed on exposed rocks. During the Neogene, oozes, terrigenous sediments, wind-borne material such as pollen and volcanic ash from the approaching Japanese volcanic arc accumulated on Takuyo-Daisan.

Presently, Takuyo-Daisan lies in a region of high plankton productivity which has led to a high diatom (Note: Diatom genera include Asterolampra, Asteromphalus, Chaetoceros, Cyclotella, Neodenticula, Nitzschia, Odontella, Paralia, Rhizosolenia, Stephanopyxis, Thalassionema, Thalassiosira, Thalassiothrix and Xanthiopyxis.) deposition rate as well as high sedimentation rates in general. Corals and sponges have been found on the seamount; crinoids may also occur there.
