= Rhodolith =

Calcareous marine nodules composed of crustose red algae

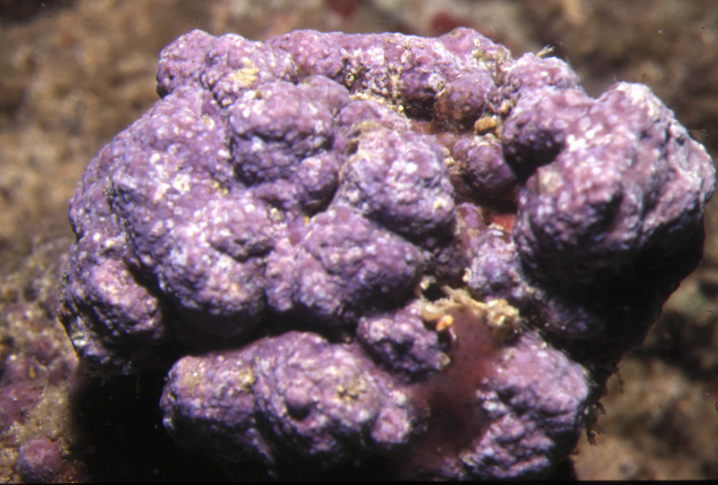
Characteristic mauve coloured rhodolith

Rhodoliths (from Greek for red rocks) are colorful, unattached calcareous nodules, composed of crustose, benthic marine red algae that resemble coral. Rhodolith beds create biogenic habitat for diverse benthic communities. The rhodolithic growth habit has been attained by a number of unrelated coralline red algae, organisms that deposit calcium carbonate within their cell walls to form hard structures or nodules that resemble beds of coral.

Rhodoliths do not attach themselves to the rocky seabed. Rather, they roll like tumbleweeds along the seafloor until they become too large in size to be mobilised by the prevailing wave and current regime. They may then become incorporated into a semi-continuous algal mat or form an algal build-up. While corals are animals that are both autotrophic (photosynthesize via their symbionts) or heterotrophic (feeding on plankton), rhodoliths produce energy solely through photosynthesis (i.e. they can only grow and survive in the photic zone of the ocean).

Scientists believe rhodoliths have been present in the world's oceans since at least the Eocene epoch, some 55 million years ago.

== Overview ==
Rhodoliths (including maërl) have been defined as calcareous nodules composed of more than 50% of coralline red algal material and consisting of one to several coralline species growing together.

== Habitat ==
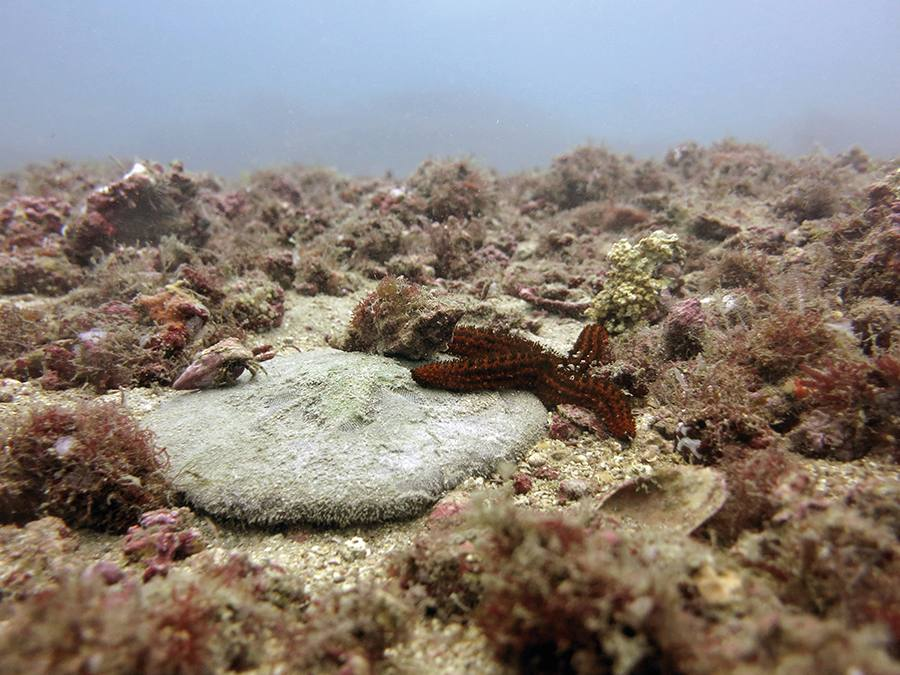
Benthic communities found in rhodolith beds Example of the seaweed and zoobenthic communities found in rhodolith beds on the Brazilian coast. This picture highlights the presence of gastropods, echinoderms and a turf algae assemblage.

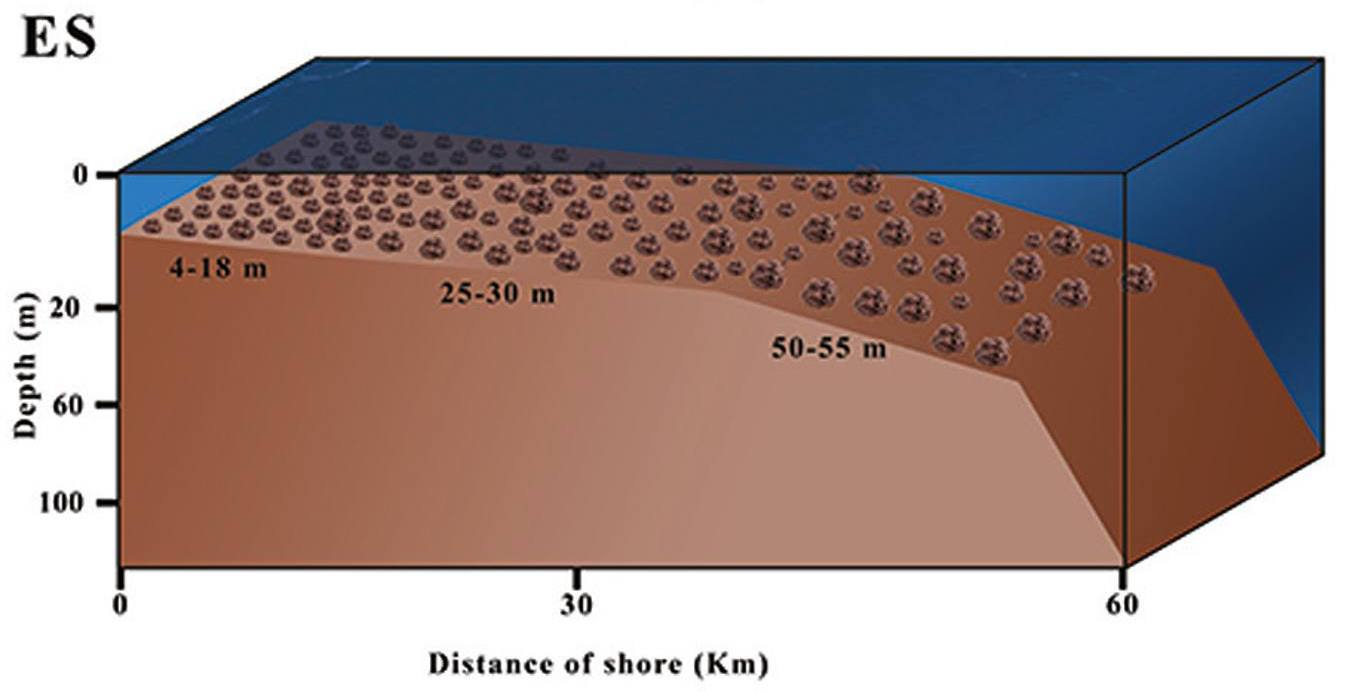
Vertical and latitudinal changes observed in the size and density of rhodoliths on the floor of the continental shelf off Espírito Santo in Brazil

Rhodolith beds have been found throughout the world's oceans, including in the Arctic near Greenland, in waters off British Columbia, Canada, the Gulf of California, Mexico, the Mediterranean as off New Zealand and eastern Australia. Globally, rhodoliths fill an important niche in the marine ecosystem, serving as a transition habitat between rocky areas and barren, sandy areas. Rhodoliths provide a stable and three-dimensional habitat onto and into which a wide variety of species can attach, including other algae, commercial species such as clams and scallops, and true corals. Rhodoliths are resilient to a variety of environmental disturbances, but can be severely impacted by harvesting of commercial species. For these reasons, rhodolith beds deserve specific actions for monitoring and conservation. Rhodoliths come in many shapes, including laminar, branching and columnar growth forms. In shallow water and high-energy environments, rhodoliths are typically mounded, thick or unbranched; branching is also rarer in deeper water, and most profuse in tropical, mid-depth waters.

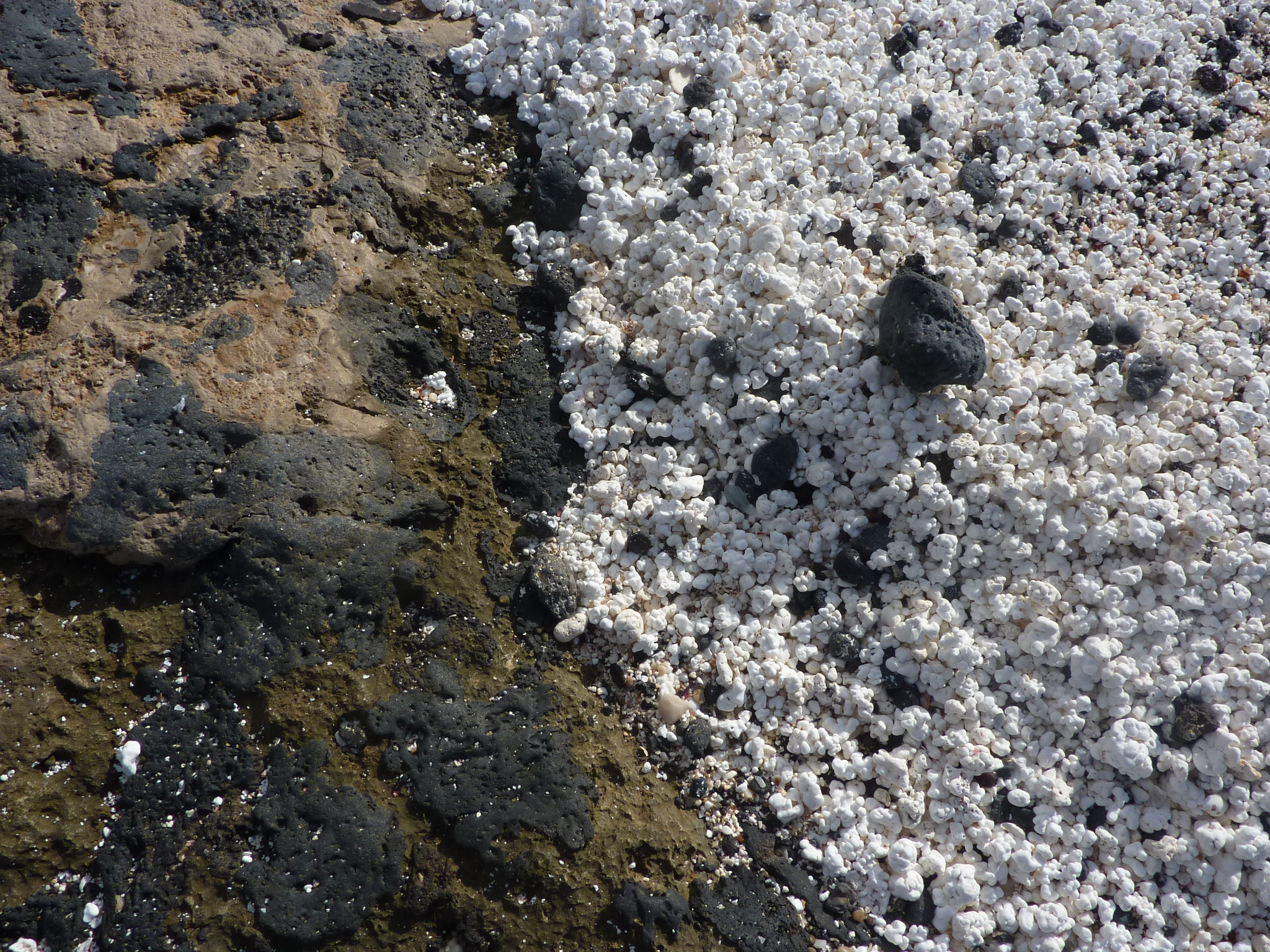
Rhodoliths on the northern shore of Fuerteventura

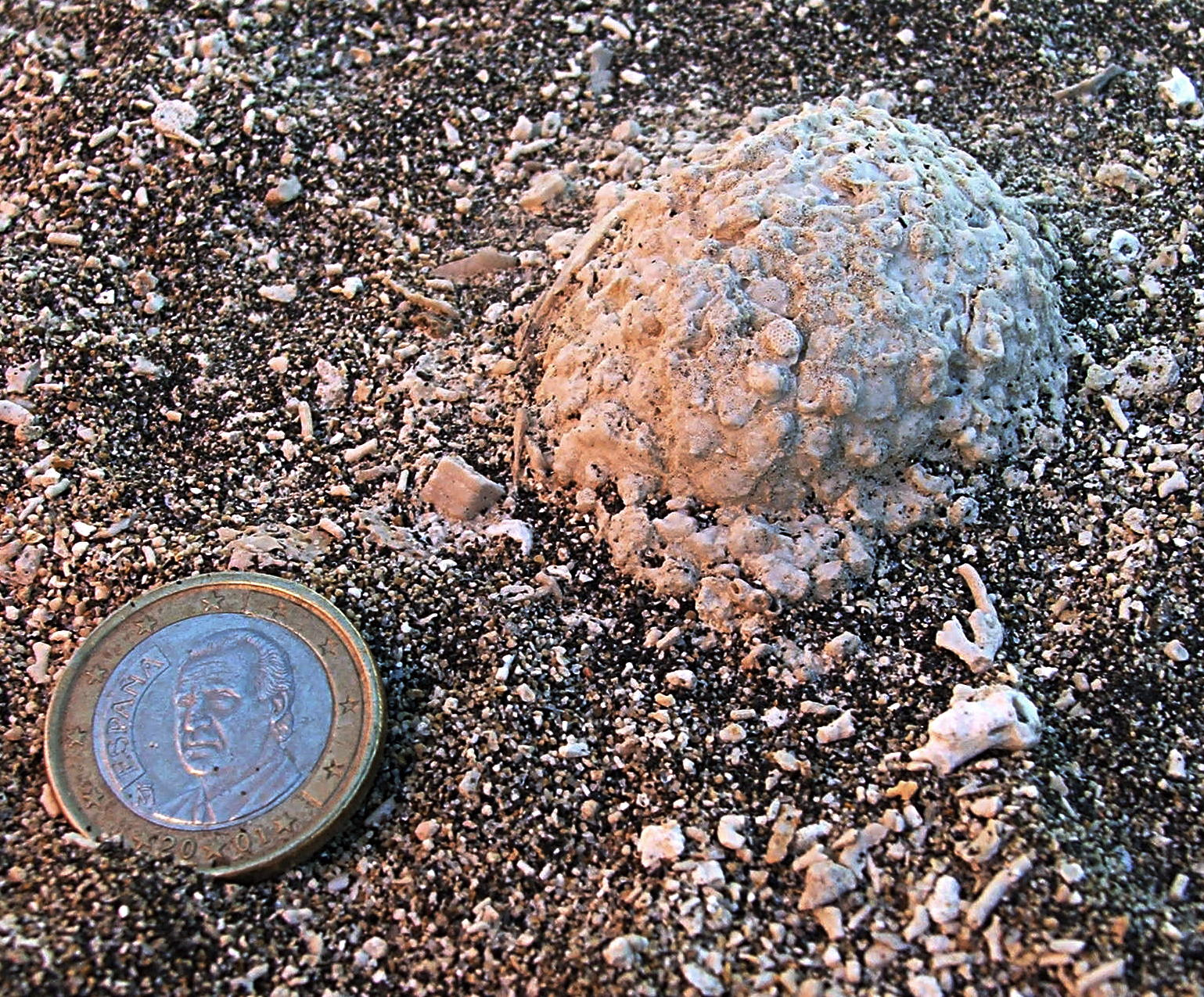
A fossilised rhodolith from the Messinian of southern Spain

== Geological significance ==
Rhodoliths are a common feature of modern and ancient carbonate shelves worldwide. Rhodolith communities contribute significantly to the global calcium carbonate budget, and fossil rhodoliths are commonly used to obtain paleoecologic and paleoclimatic information. Under the right circumstances, rhodoliths can be the main carbonate sediment producers, often forming rudstone or floatstone beds consisting of rhodoliths and their fragments in grainy matrix.

== Climate change and the rhodolith holobiont ==
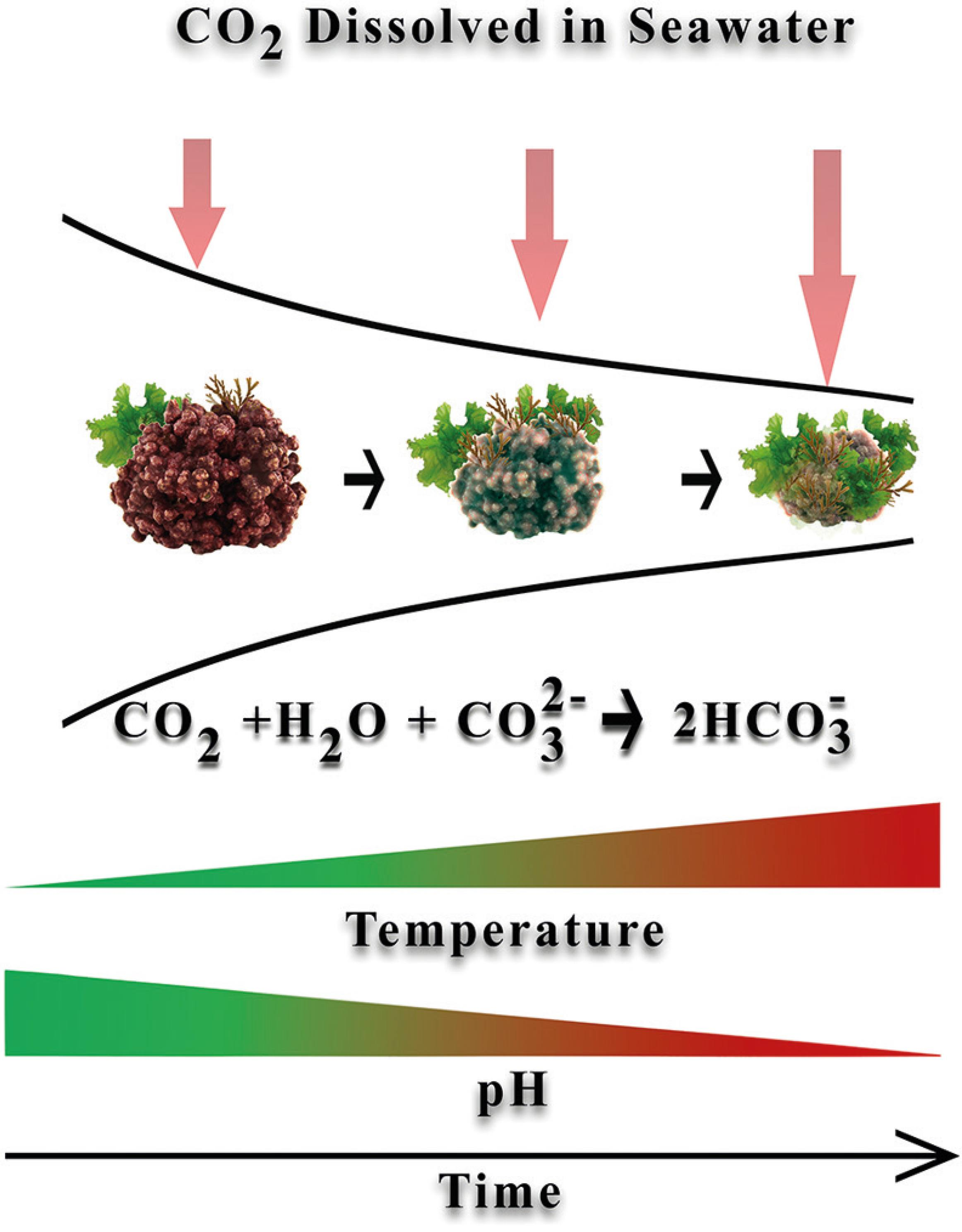
A view of rhodolith beds impacted by the warmer and more acidified oceans predicted by the IPPC.

Rhodoliths are significant photosynthesizers, calcifiers, and ecosystem engineers, which raises an issue about how they might respond to ocean acidification.

Changes in ocean carbonate chemistry driven by increasing anthropogenic carbon dioxide emissions promotes ocean acidification. Increasing the ocean carbon dioxide uptake results in increases in pCO_{2} (the partial pressure of carbon dioxide in the ocean) as well as lower pH levels and a lower carbonate saturation in the seawater. These affect the calcification process. Organisms like rhodoliths accrete carbonate as part of their physical structure, since precipitating CaCO_{3} would be less efficient. Ocean acidification presents a threat by potentially affecting their growth and reproduction. Coralline algae are particularly sensitive to ocean acidification because they precipitate high magnesium-calcite carbonate skeletons, the most soluble form of CaCO_{3}.

Calcification rates in coralline algae are thought to be directly related to their photosynthetic rates, but it is not clear how a high-CO_{2} environment might affect rhodoliths. Elevated CO_{2} levels might impair biomineralization due to decreased seawater carbonate (CO^{2−}_{3}) availability as pH falls, but photosynthesis could be promoted as the availability of bicarbonate (HCO^{−}_{3}) increases. This would result in a parabolic relationship between declining pH and coralline algal fitness, which could explain why varied responses to declining pH and elevated pCO_{2} have been recorded to date.

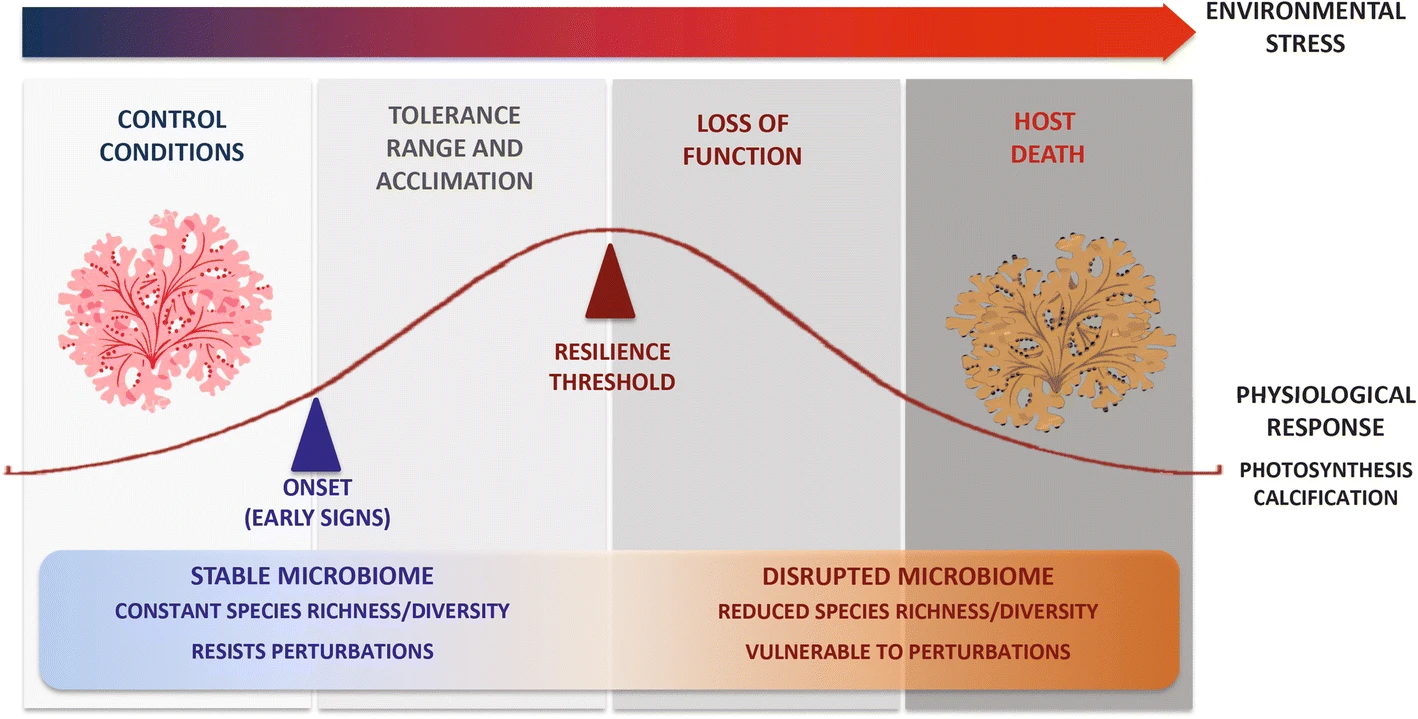
Climate change and the rhodolith holobiont Expected parabolic relationship between climate change stressors and rhodolith holobiont fitness. Under normal conditions healthy rhodoliths possess stable microbiomes, important to holobiont function. However, beyond the thresholds of algal physiological tolerance, disruption of positive host-microbiome interactions occurs, detrimentally affecting holobiont fitness.

The widespread distribution of rhodoliths hints at the resilience of this algal group, which have persisted as chief components of benthic marine communities through considerable environment changes over geologic times.

In 2018 the first metagenomic analysis of live rhodoliths was published. Whole genome shotgun sequencing was performed on a variety of rhodolith bed constituents. This revealed a stable live rhodolith microbiome thriving under elevated pCO_{2} conditions, with positive physiological responses such as increased photosynthetic activity and no calcium carbonate biomass loss over time. However, the seawater column and coralline skeleton biofilms showed significant microbial shifts. These findings reinforce the existence of a close host-microbe functional entity, where the metabolic crosstalk within the rhodolith as a holobiont could be exerting reciprocal influence over the associated microbiome.

While the microbiome associated with live rhodoliths remained stable and resembled a healthy holobiont, the microbial community associated with the water column changed after exposure to elevated pCO_{2}.

== See also ==
- Maerl

== Other references ==
- Riosmena-Rodríguez R, Nelson W and Aguirre J (Eds.) (2016) Rhodolith/Maërl Beds: A Global Perspective Springer. ISBN 9783319293158.
