= Zittelina =

Zittelina may refer to:

- Zittelina (brachiopod), a fossil genus of brachiopods in the family Kingenidae
- Zittelina (alga), a fossil genus of alga in the family Dasycladaceae
