= Mudstone =

Fine grained sedimentary rock whose original constituents were clays or muds

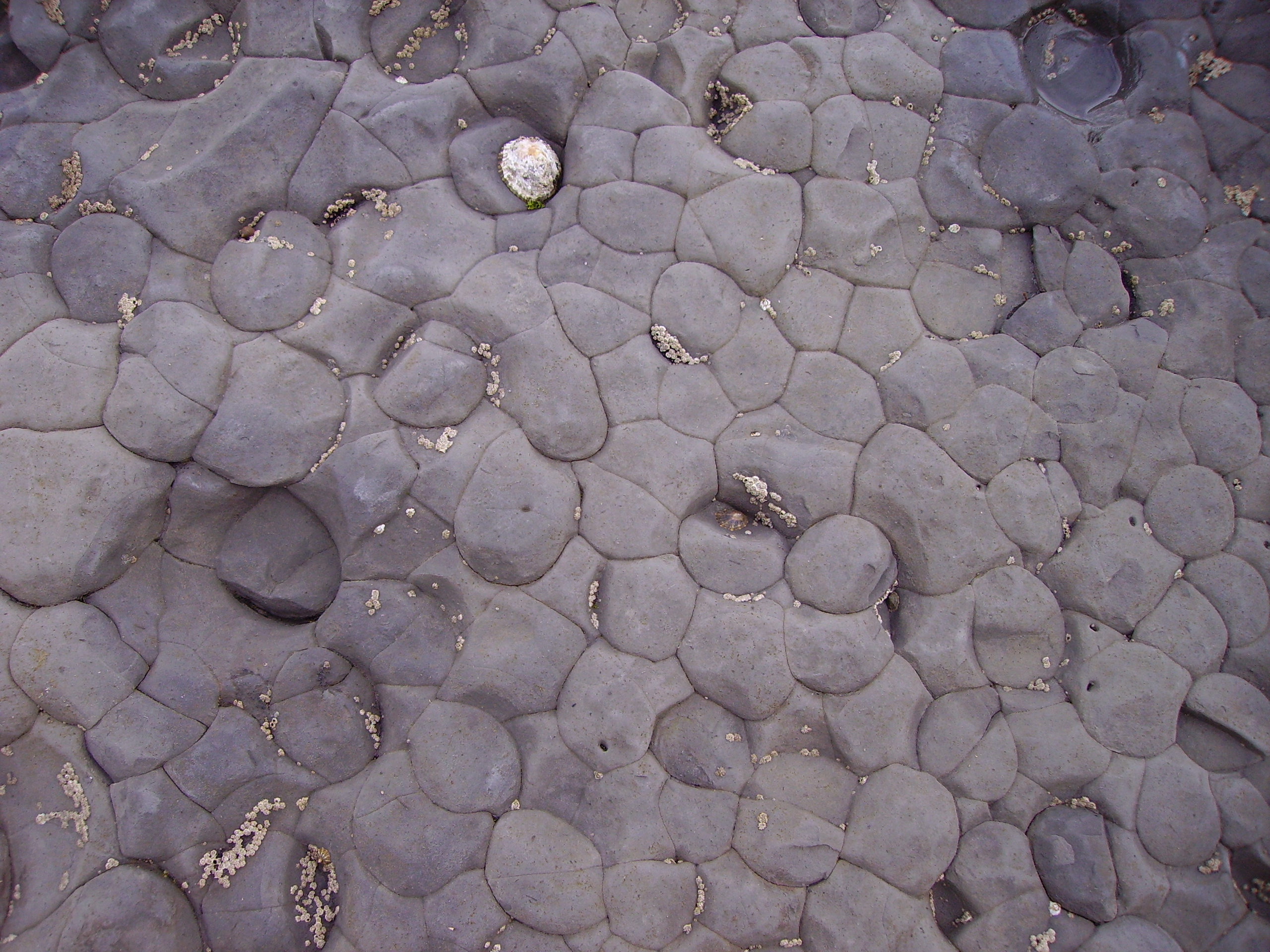
Mudstone on east beach of Lyme Regis, England

Mudstone, a type of mudrock, is a fine-grained sedimentary rock whose original constituents were clays or muds. Mudstone is distinguished from shale by its lack of fissility.

The term mudstone is also used to describe carbonate rocks (limestone or dolomite) that are composed predominantly of carbonate mud. However, in most contexts, the term refers to siliciclastic mudstone, composed mostly of silicate minerals.

The NASA Curiosity rover has found deposits of mudstone on Mars that contain organic substances such as propane, benzene and toluene.

== Definition ==
There is not a single definition of mudstone that has gained general acceptance, though there is wide agreement that mudstones are fine-grained sedimentary rocks, composed mostly of silicate grains with a grain size less than 0.063 millimetres (0.0025 in). Individual grains this size are too small to be distinguished without a microscope, which means that most classifications emphasize texture rather than mineral composition, and mudstones have historically received less attention from petrologists than have sandstones. The simplest definition is that a mudstone is a fine-grained clastic sedimentary rock that is not laminated or fissile. Most definitions also include a requirement that the rock contain significant amounts of both silt- and clay-sized grains. One common requirement is that a mudstone is a mudrock (a rock containing more than 50% silt- to clay-sized particles) in which between a third and two-thirds of the mud (silt and clay) fraction is clay particles. Another definition is that mudstone is a sedimentary rock in which neither silt, clay, nor coarser grains is predominant. Rock of this composition that does show laminations or fissility is sometimes described as mudshale rather than mudstone.

The lack of fissility or layering in mudstone may be due to either original texture or the disruption of layering by burrowing organisms in the sediment prior to lithification. Mudstone looks like hardened clay and, depending upon the circumstances under which it was formed, it may show cracks or fissures, like a sun-baked clay deposit.

When the mineral composition of mudstones has been determined, using such techniques as scanning electron microscopy, electron probe microanalysis, or X-ray diffraction analysis, they have been found to be composed primarily of clay minerals, quartz, and feldspars, with a variety of accessory minerals.

== Carbonate mudstone ==
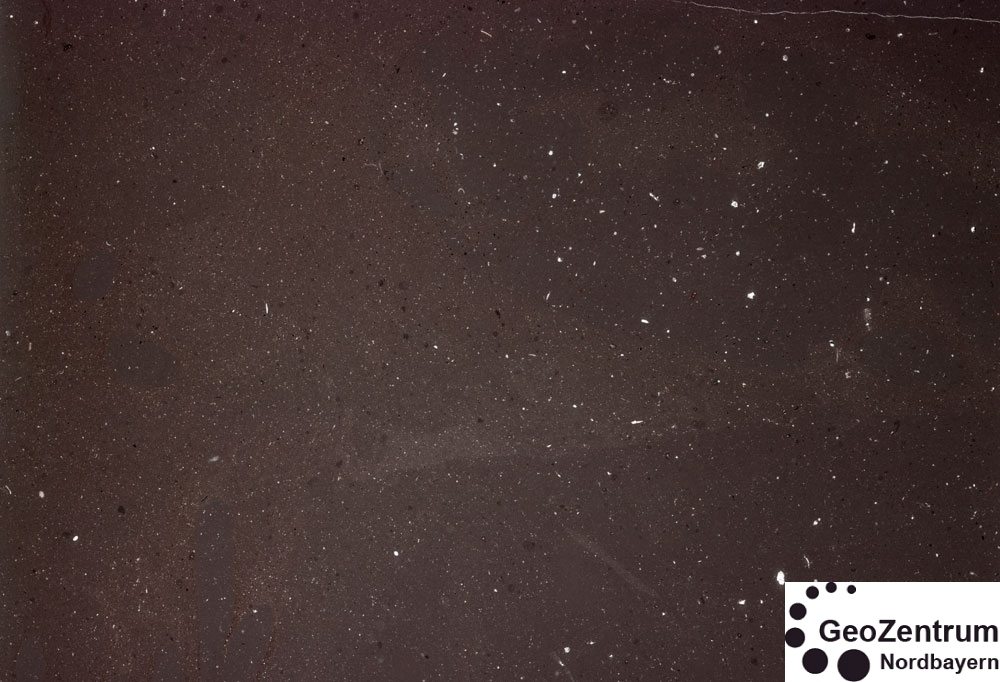
A mudstone: few small components in a micritic matrix, width of picture is 32 mm

In the Dunham classification (Dunham, 1962) system of limestones, a mudstone is defined as a mud-supported carbonate rock that contains less than 10% grains. Most recently, this definition has been clarified as a matrix-supported carbonate-dominated rock composed of more than 90% carbonate mud (<63 μm) component.

=== The identification of carbonate mudstone ===
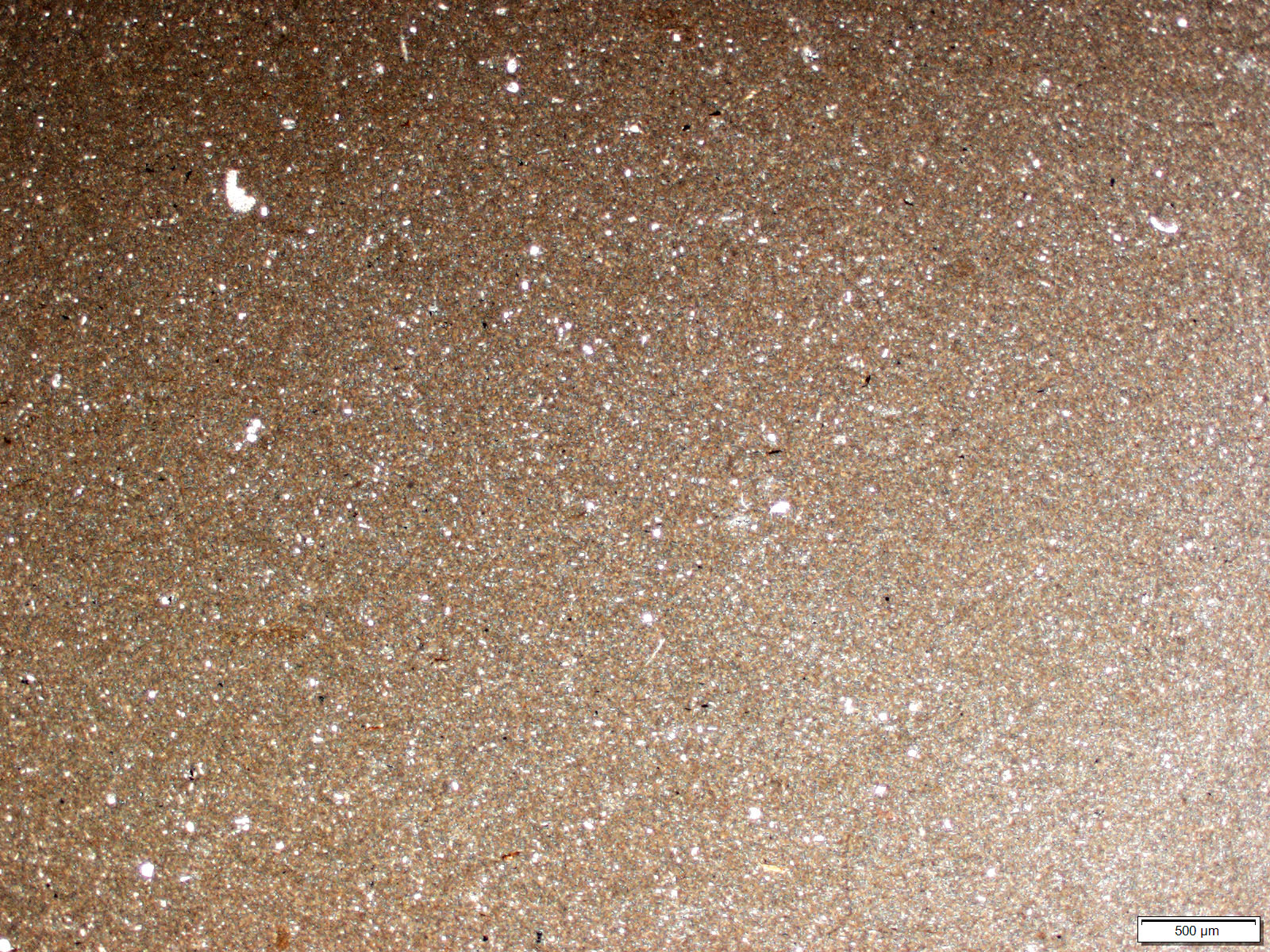
Thin section photomicrograph of carbonate mudstone

A recent study by Lokier and Al Junaibi (2016) has highlighted that the most common problems encountered when describing a mudstone is to incorrectly estimate the volume of 'grains' in the sample - in consequence, misidentifying mudstone as wackestone and vice versa. The original Dunham classification (1962) defined the matrix as clay and fine-silt size sediment <20 μm in diameter. This definition was redefined by Embry & Klovan (1971) to a grain size of less than or equal to 30 μm. Wright (1992) proposed a further increase to the upper limit for the matrix size in order to bring it into line with the upper limit for silt (63 μm).

== Mudstone mineralogy on Mars ==
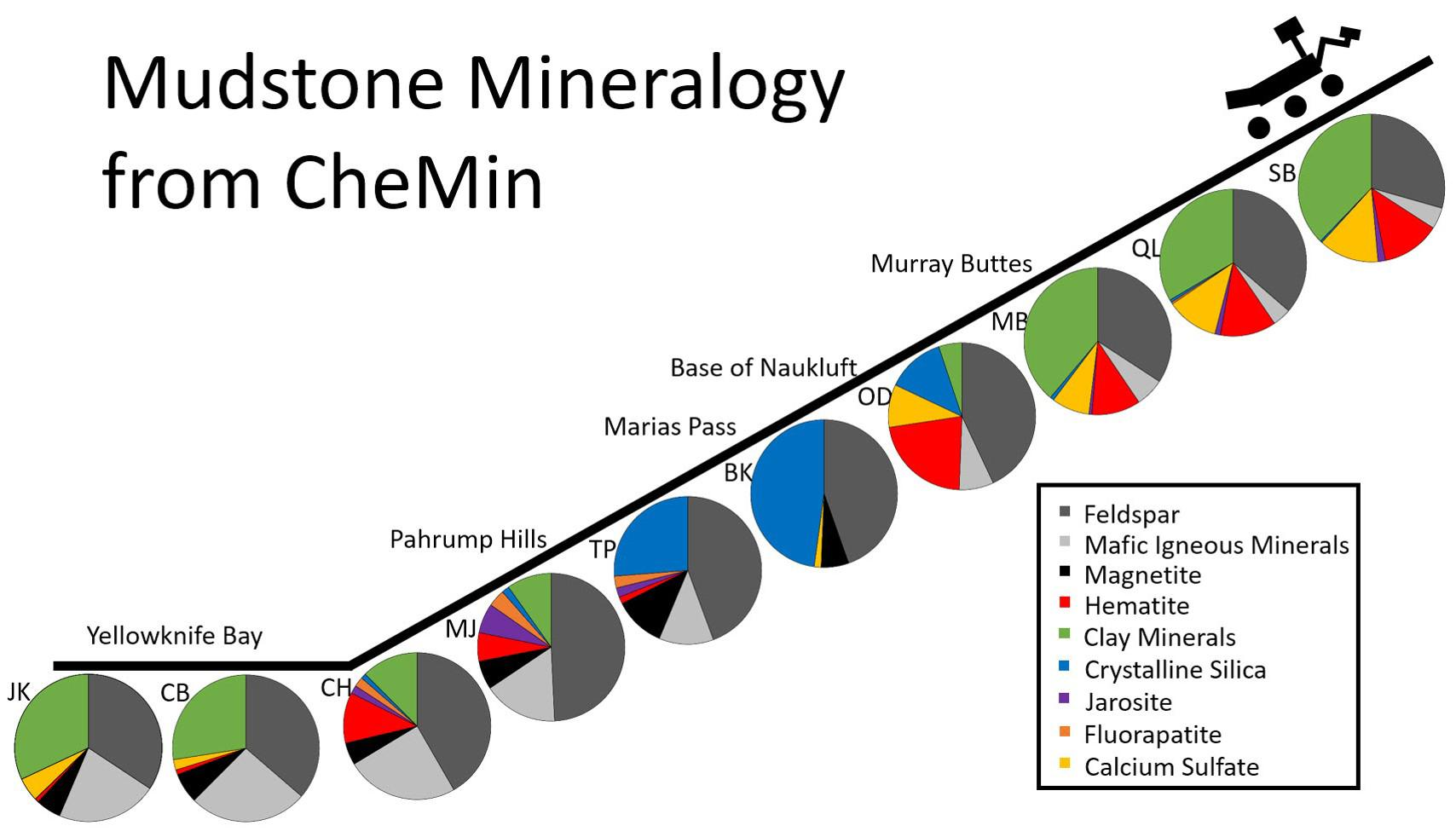
Curiosity rover - mudstone mineralogy - 2013 to 2016 on Mars (CheMin; December 13, 2016) NOTE: JK for "John Klein", CB for "Cumberland". CH for "Confidence Hills", MJ for "Mojave", TP for "Telegraph Peak", BK for "Buckskin", OD for "Oudam", MB for "Marimba", QL for "Quela", and SB for Sebina. (For locations/drillings, see image)

On December 13, 2016, NASA reported further evidence supporting habitability on the planet Mars as the Curiosity rover climbed higher, studying younger layers, on Mount Sharp. Also reported, the very soluble element boron was detected for the first time on Mars. In June 2018, NASA reported that Curiosity had detected kerogen and other complex organic compounds from mudstone rocks approximately 3.5 billion years old.

== See also ==
- Mudstone on planet Mars
  - Aeolis quadrangle
  - Composition of Mars
  - Timeline of Mars Science Laboratory
- Tonstein – Type of sedimentary rock
