= Packstone =

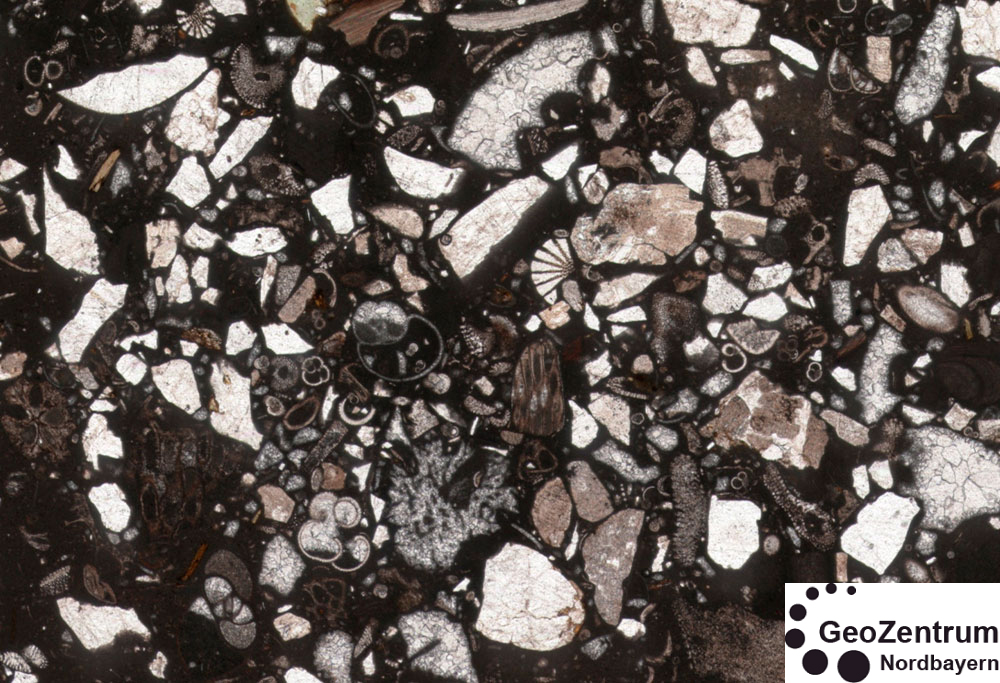
A Packstone: grain supported by small grains (width of picture is 7mm)

Under the Dunham classification (Dunham, 1962) system of limestones, a packstone is defined as a grain-supported carbonate rock that contains 1% or more mud-grade fraction. This definition has been clarified by Lokier and Al Junaibi (2016) as a carbonate-dominated lithology containing carbonate mud (<63 μm) in a fabric supported by a sand grade (63 μm to 2 mm) grain-size fraction and where less than 10% of the volume consists of grains >2 mm.

== The identification of packstone ==
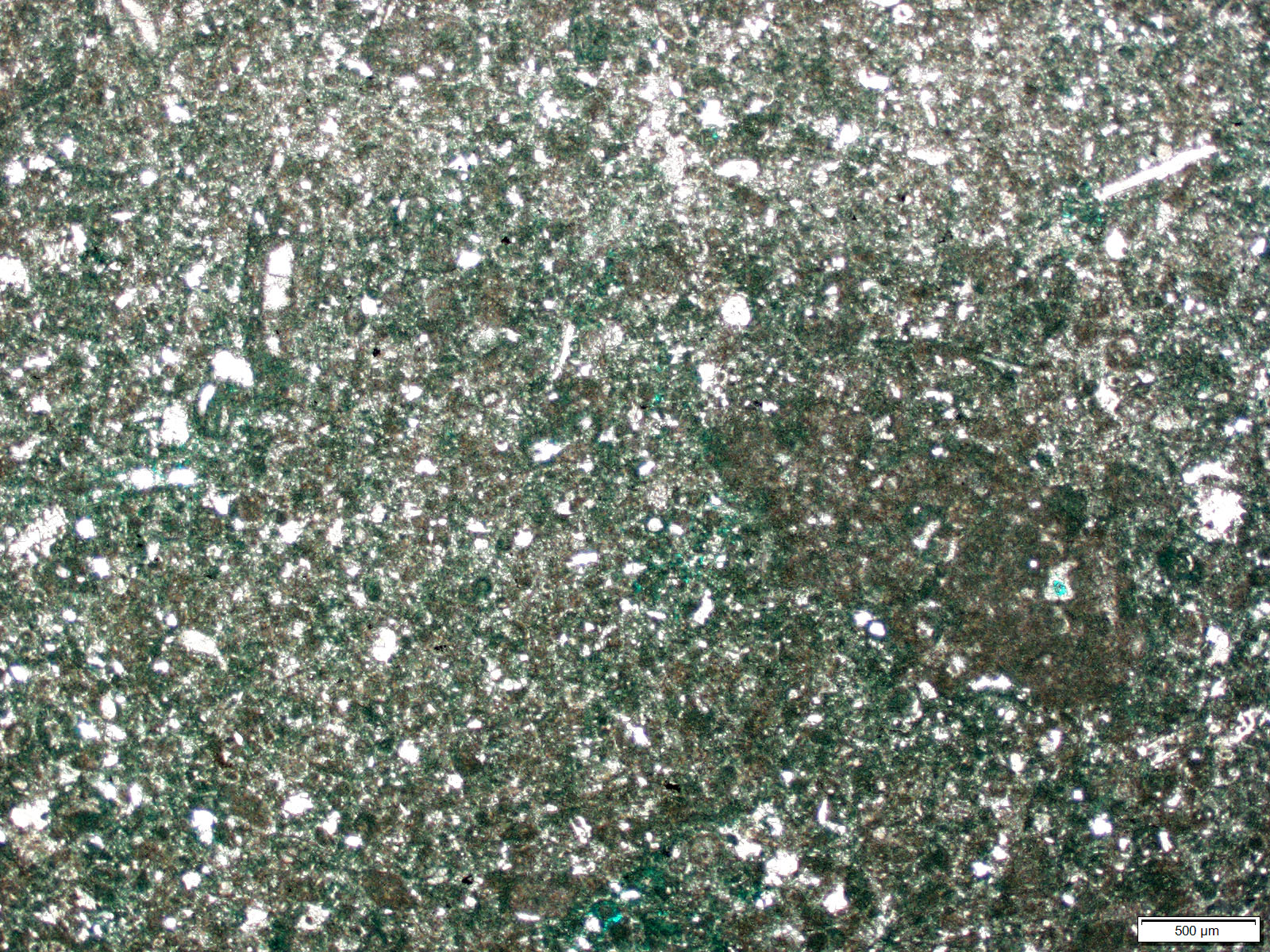
Thin section photomicrograph of peloid packstone with fragmented bioclasts.

A study of the adoption and use of carbonate classification systems by Lokier and Al Junaibi (2016) identified three common problems encountered when describing a packstone:

- Failure to identify the fabric as supported by the sand grade grain-size fraction - resulting in misidentification as wackestone.
- Packstones with very small volumes of carbonate mud may be misclassified as grainstone.
- Incorrectly estimating the volume of the component grains >2 mm.
