= Takuyo-Daini =

Seamount in the Pacific Ocean

- Takuyo-Daini (Oceania) Location offshore Japan

Location
- Location: Western Pacific Ocean
- Coordinates: 34.3°N 143.9°E

Geology
- Age of rock: Cretaceous

Takuyo-Daini is a seamount in the Pacific Ocean.

Takuyo-Daini is part of the so-called "Seiko" cluster or the "Geisha Guyots" in the Japanese Seamounts; it lies just west of Takuyo-Daisan seamount with which it forms a pair. Takuyo-Daini rises from a depth of 5,195 metres (17,044 ft) to a minimum depth of 1,420 metres (4,660 ft) and has a regular round shape with a small volume of 2,237 cubic kilometres (537 cu mi). Both seamounts are guyots and together with two other guyots known as Winterer and Isakov have been interpreted as being part of a hotspot track.

The Western Pacific Ocean contains a large number of seamounts which often from clusters or groups. Many of them have flat tops 1–2 kilometres (0.62–1.24 mi) below sea level. A number of these formed during a large-scale volcanic episode in the Albian-Aptian era of the Cretaceous; this includes Takuyo-Daini, where radiometric dating has yielded ages of 118.6 million years ago. At the time of its formation this seamount was located in the central Pacific Ocean. Fossils of rudist bivalves have been found on Takuyo-Daini; the seamount once featured rudist reefs that ceased growing during the Albian and define a Auroradiolites biconvexus–Magallanesia rutogensis faunal assemblage. The rudist genera Magallanesia was discovered on Takuyo-Daini and on Cebu in the Philippines. Extant animal species at Takuyo-Daini include Halicmetus fish.
