= Grainstone =

Type of limestone

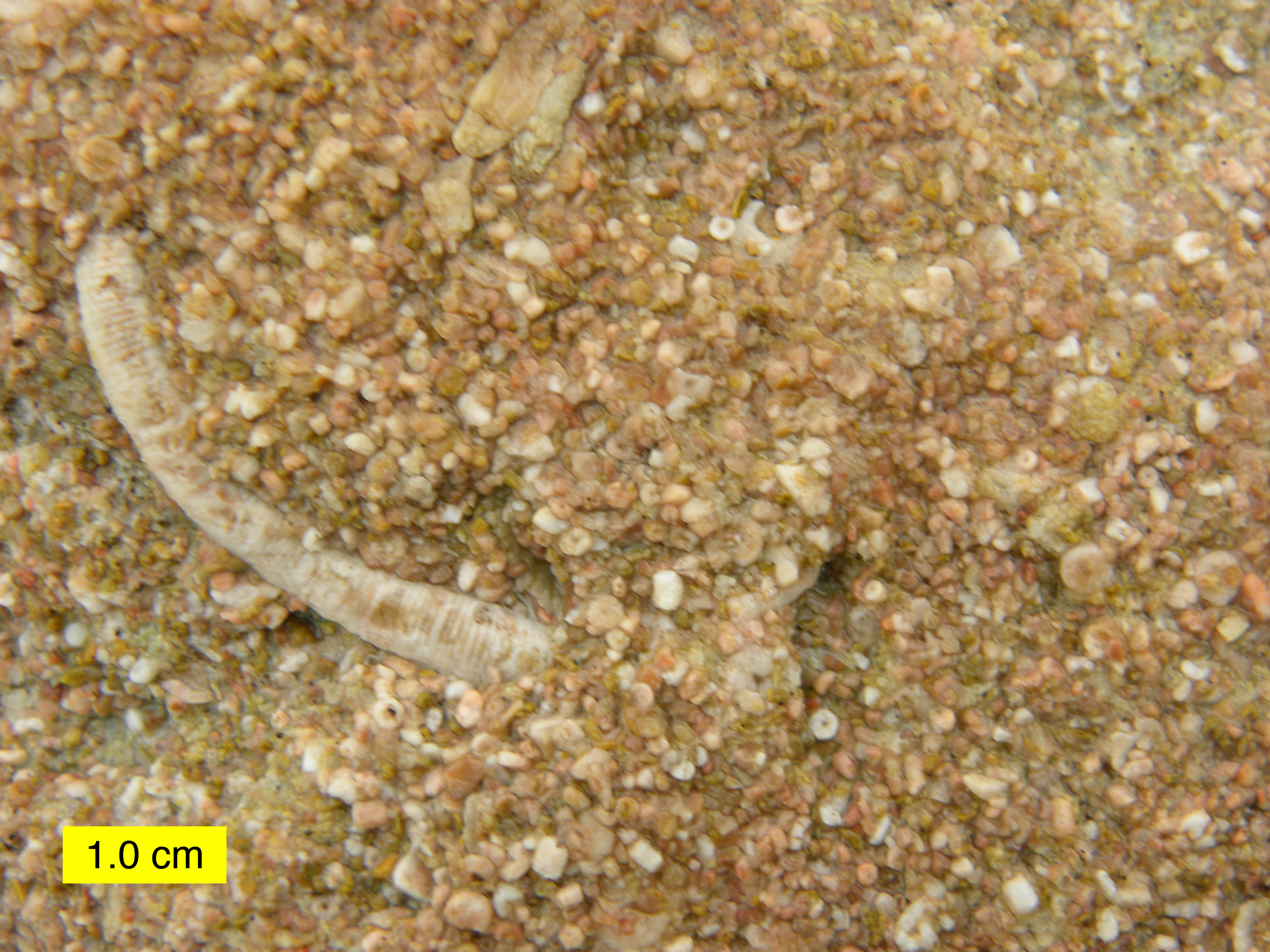
Grainstone in the Dunham Classification (Brassfield Formation near Fairborn, Ohio). Grains are crinoid fragments.

Under the Dunham classification (Dunham, 1962) system of limestones, a grainstone is defined as a grain-supported carbonate rock that contains less than 1% mud-grade material. This definition has recently been clarified as a carbonate-dominated rock that does not contain any carbonate mud and where less than 10% of the components are larger than 2 mm. The spaces between grains may be empty (pores) or filled by cement.

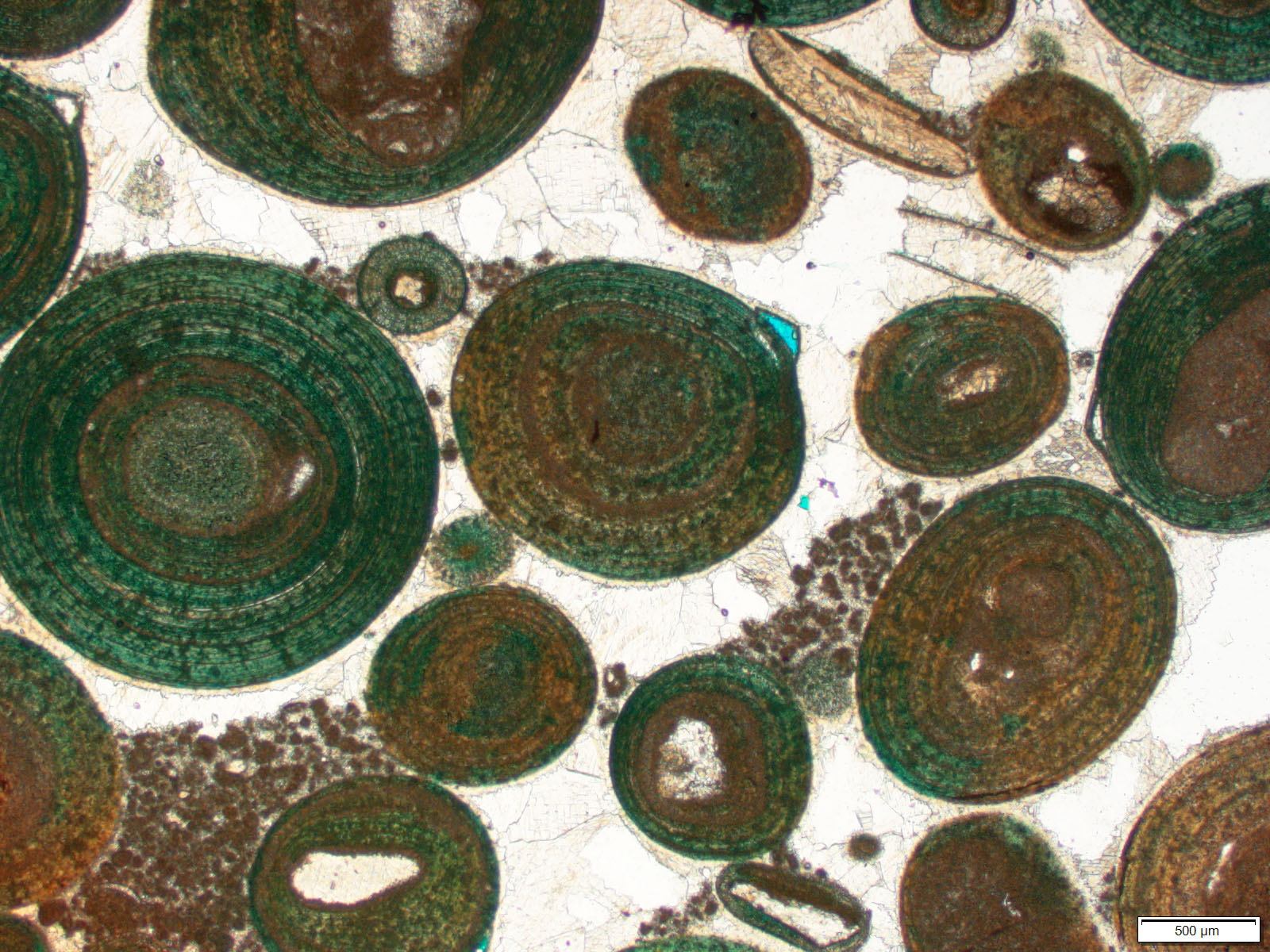
Thin section photomicrograph of calcite cemented coarse-grained ooid grainstone

== The identification of grainstone ==
The presence of any primary carbonate mud precludes a classification of grainstone. A study of the use of carbonate classification systems by Lokier and Al Junaibi highlighted that the most common source of confusion in the classification of grainstone was to misidentify fine-grained internal micrite, generated by in-situ processes, as clay–silt grade sediment - thus resulting in the misidentification of grainstone as packstone. Failure to correctly determine the size and abundance of component grains greater than two millimeters was also a source of error.

Dunham's original definition of grainstone stated that it must contain less than 1% mud to fine-silt grade (<20 μm) sediment. Embry and Klovan and Wright reduced the permitted amount of carbonate mud in a grainstone to zero. Given that grainstone facies are interpreted to have been deposited under high-energy conditions, it is sensible to preclude the presence of primary carbonate mud from this classification.

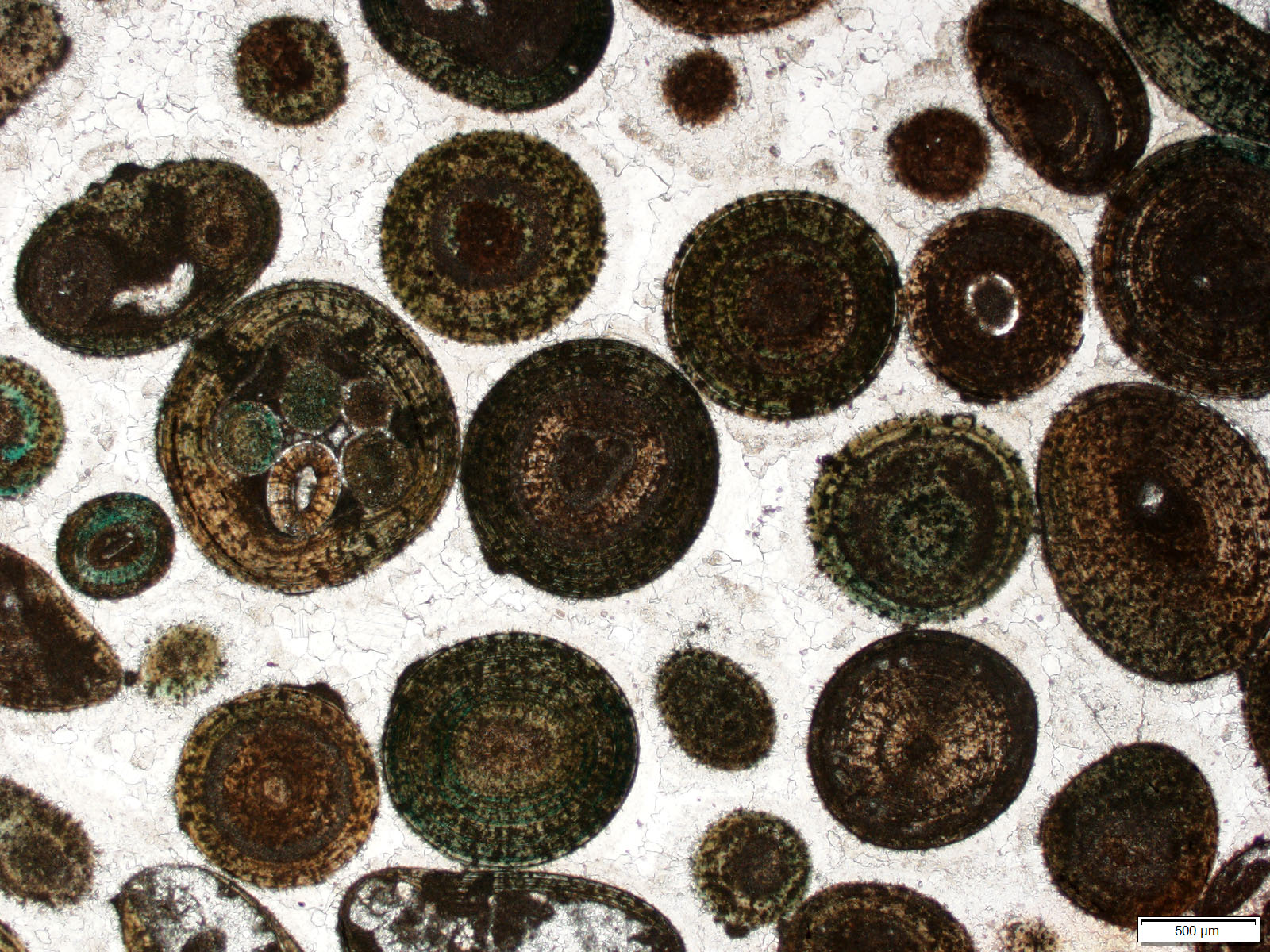
Thin section photomicrograph of calcite cemented ooid grainstone
