= Thalassiothrix =

Scientific classification
- Domain: Eukaryota
- Clade: Diaphoretickes
- Clade: Sar
- Clade: Stramenopiles
- Phylum: Gyrista
- Subphylum: Ochrophytina
- Class: Bacillariophyceae
- Order: Thalassionematales
- Family: Thalassionemataceae
- Genus: Thalassiothrix; P.T. Cleve & A. Grunow 1880

Genus of single-celled organisms

Thalassiothrix is a genus of protist belonging to the family Thalassionemataceae.

The genus was described in 1880 by Cleve and Grunow.

Species:

- Thalassiothrix acuta G. Karsten, 1905
- Thalassiothrix antarctica A. Schimper ex G. Karsten, 1905
- Thalassiothrix fruaenfeldii (Grunow) Grunow, 1880
- Thalassiothrix gibberula G.R. Hasle
- Thalassiothrix heteromorpha Karsten, 1907
- Thalassiothrix longissima Cleve & Grunow, 1880
- Thalassiothrix mediterranea Pavillard
- Thalassiothrix miocenica H.J. Schrader
- Thalassiothrix monospina H.J. Schrader
- Thalassiothrix robusta (H.J. Schrader) F. Akiba
- Thalassiothrix spathulata G.R. Hasle
