= Dunham classification =

System for carbonate sedimentary rocks

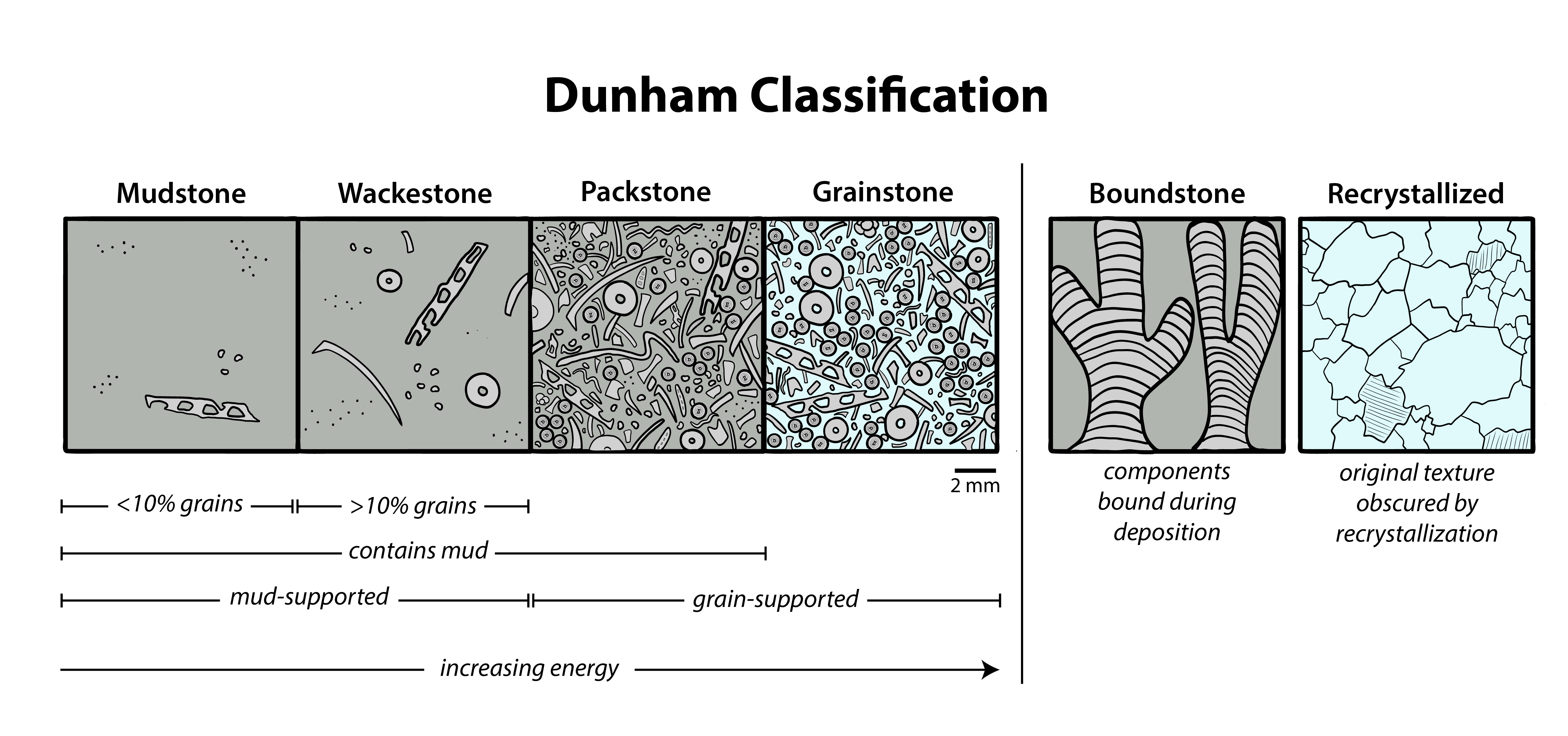
Diagram showing the Dunham carbonate classification scheme

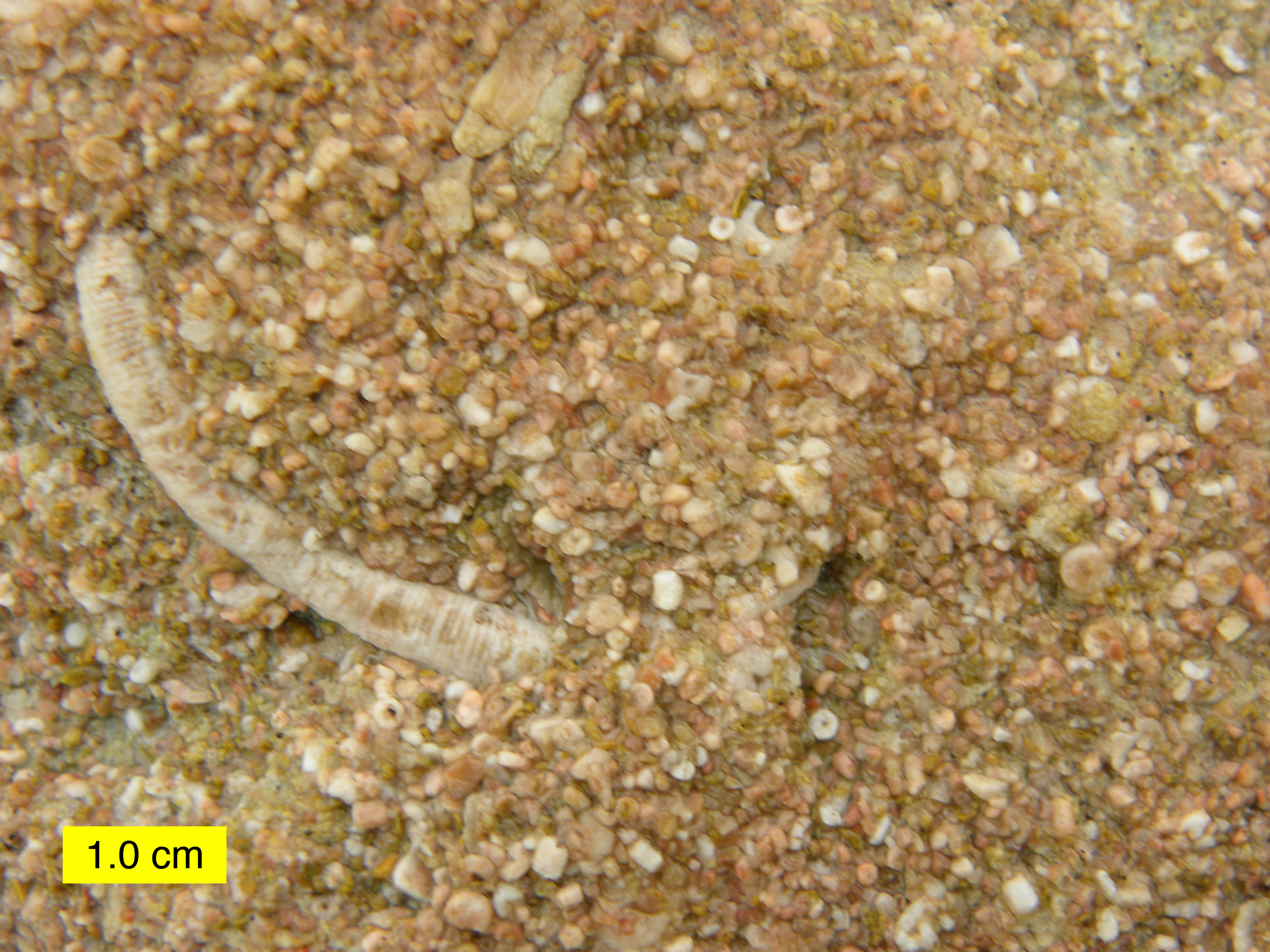
Grainstone in the Dunham Classification (Brassfield Formation near Fairborn, Ohio). Grains are crinoid fragments.

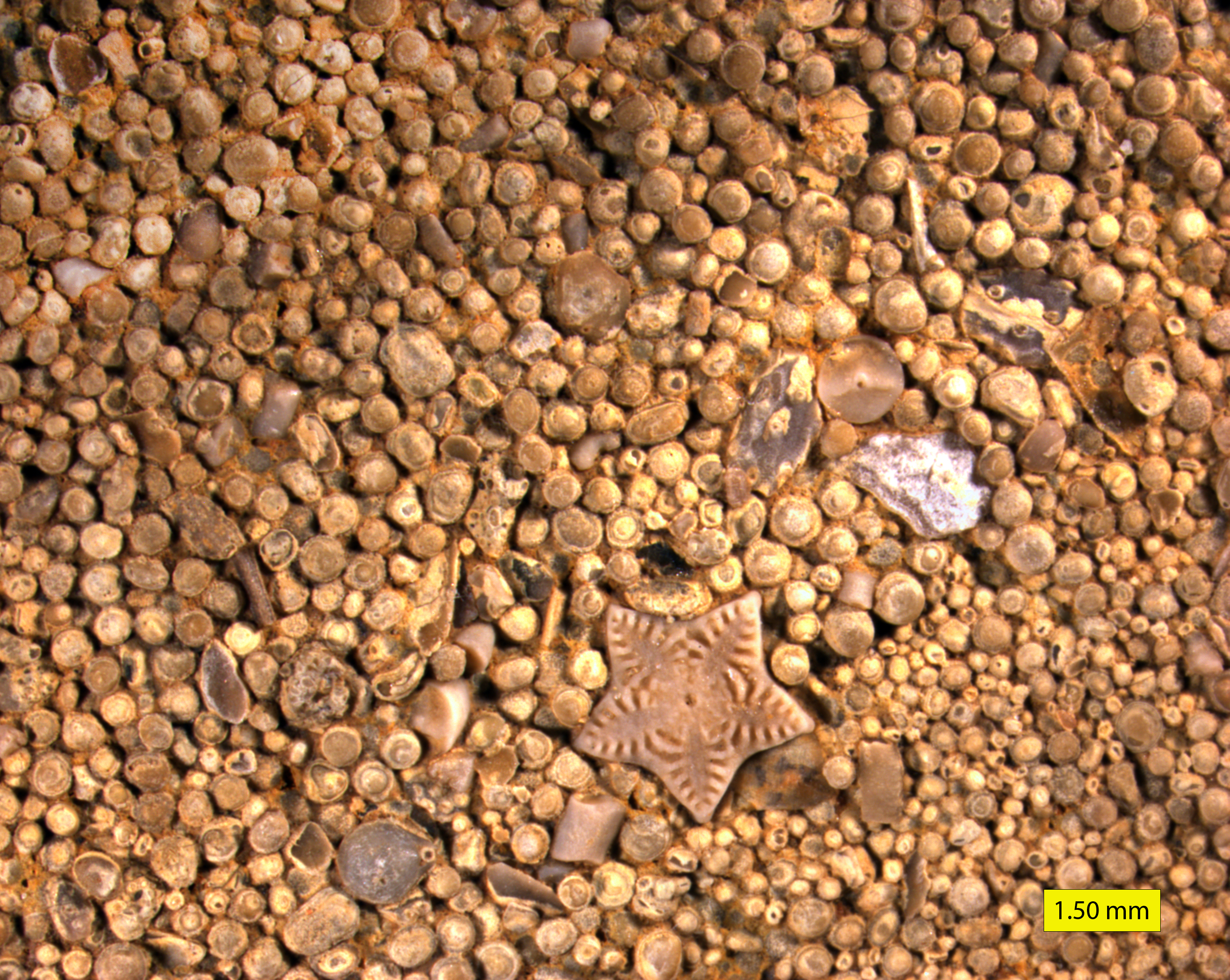
Grainstone with calcitic ooids, crinoid fragments, and sparry calcite cement; Carmel Formation, Middle Jurassic, of southern Utah, USA.

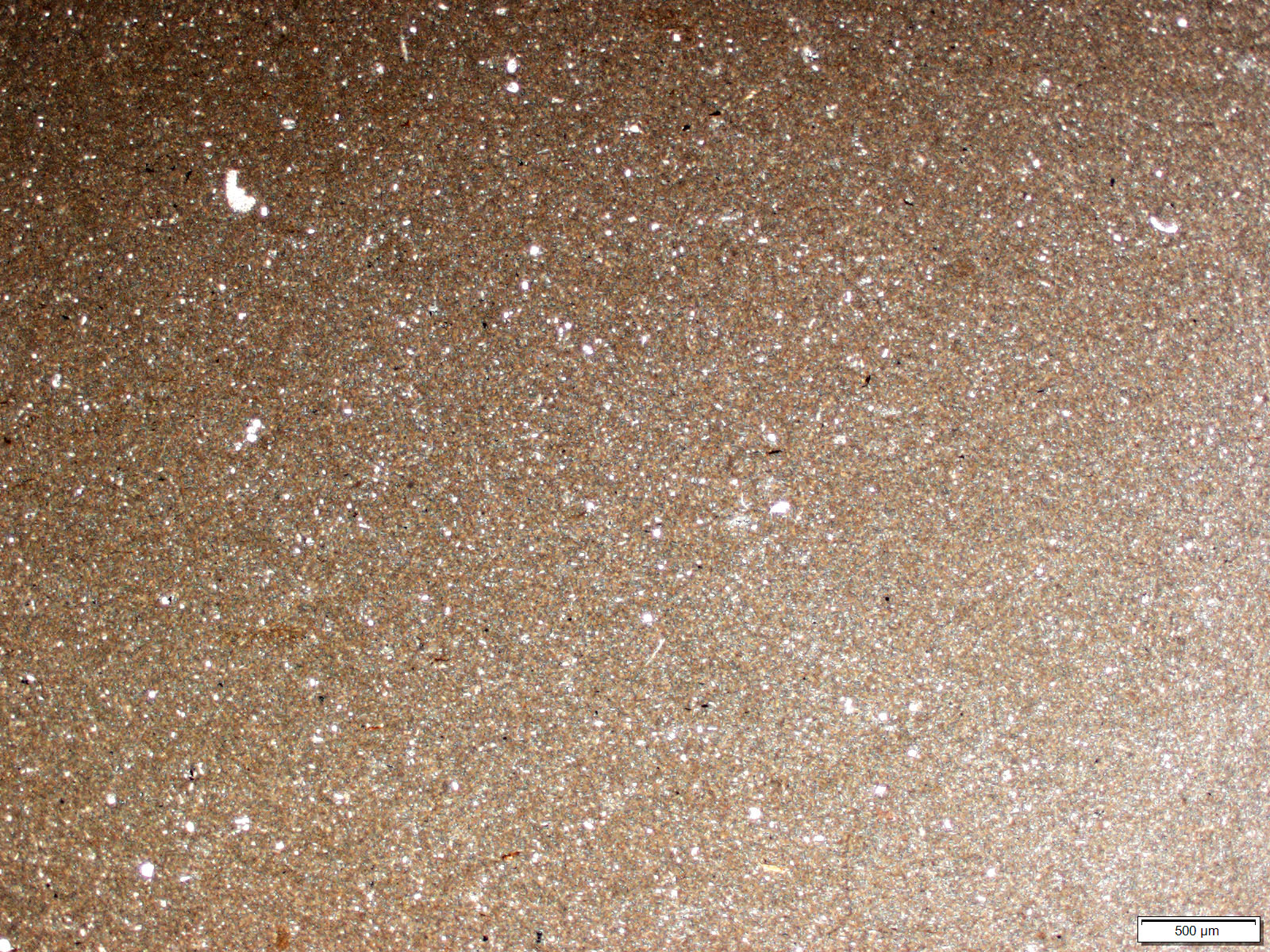
Thin section photomicrograph of a carbonate mudstone in plane polarised light.

The Dunham classification system for carbonate sedimentary rocks was originally devised by Robert J. Dunham (1924–1994) in 1962, and subsequently modified by Embry and Klovan in 1971 to include coarse-grained limestones and sediments that had been organically bound at the time of deposition. The modified Dunham Classification has subsequently become the most widely employed system for the classification of carbonate sedimentary rocks, with 89% of workers currently adopting this system over the alternative Folk classification scheme.

== History ==
=== Original classification ===
Robert J. Dunham published his classification system for limestone in 1962. The original Dunham classification system was developed in order to provide convenient depositional-texture based class names that focus attention on the textural properties that are most significant for interpreting the depositional environment of the rocks.

The three criteria used to define the original Dunham classes were:

- the supporting fabric of the original sediment
- the presence or absence of mud (the fraction <20 μm in size)
- evidence that the sediments were organically-bound at the time of deposition

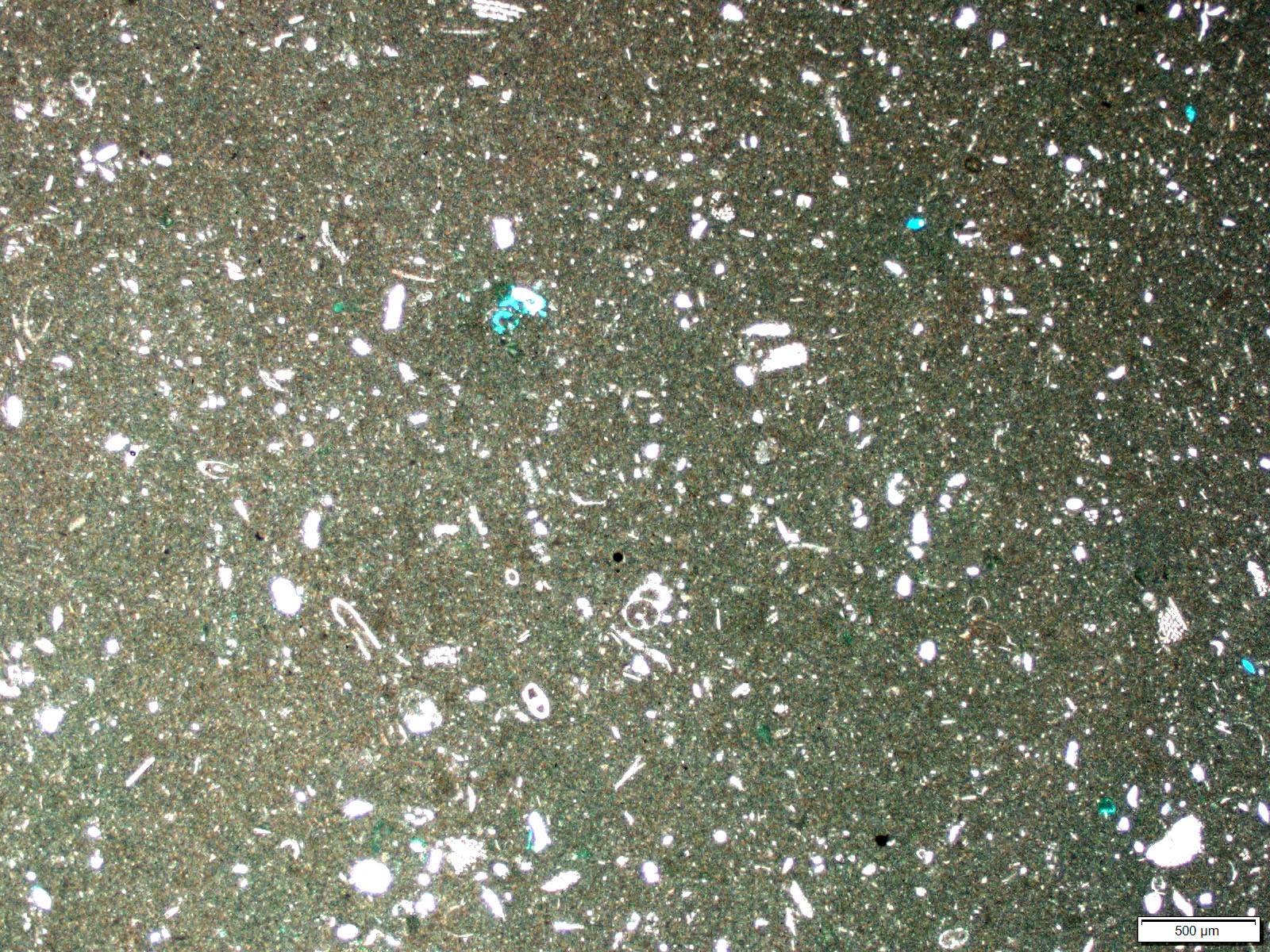
Thin section photomicrograph of a fragmented bioclast wackestone in plane polarised light.

On the basis of these criteria, the following four classes were defined:

Mudstone
a mud-supported carbonate rock containing <10% grains.
Wackestone
a mud-supported carbonate lithology containing >10% grains.
Packstone
a grain-supported fabric containing 1% or more mud-grade fraction.
Grainstone
a grain-supported carbonate rock with <1% mud.

Recognising that these classes did not encompass all carbonate lithologies, Dunham defined two additional classes within his scheme:

Boundstone
where there is any evidence that the carbonate sediments were bound at the time of deposition.
Crystalline dolomite or Crystalline limestone
where recrystallisation has made the original depositional fabric of a carbonate rock unidentifiable.

Dunham specifically stated that, where appropriate, these six textural class names are intended to be combined with modifiers describing grains and mineralogy. The original classification can be summarized as follows:

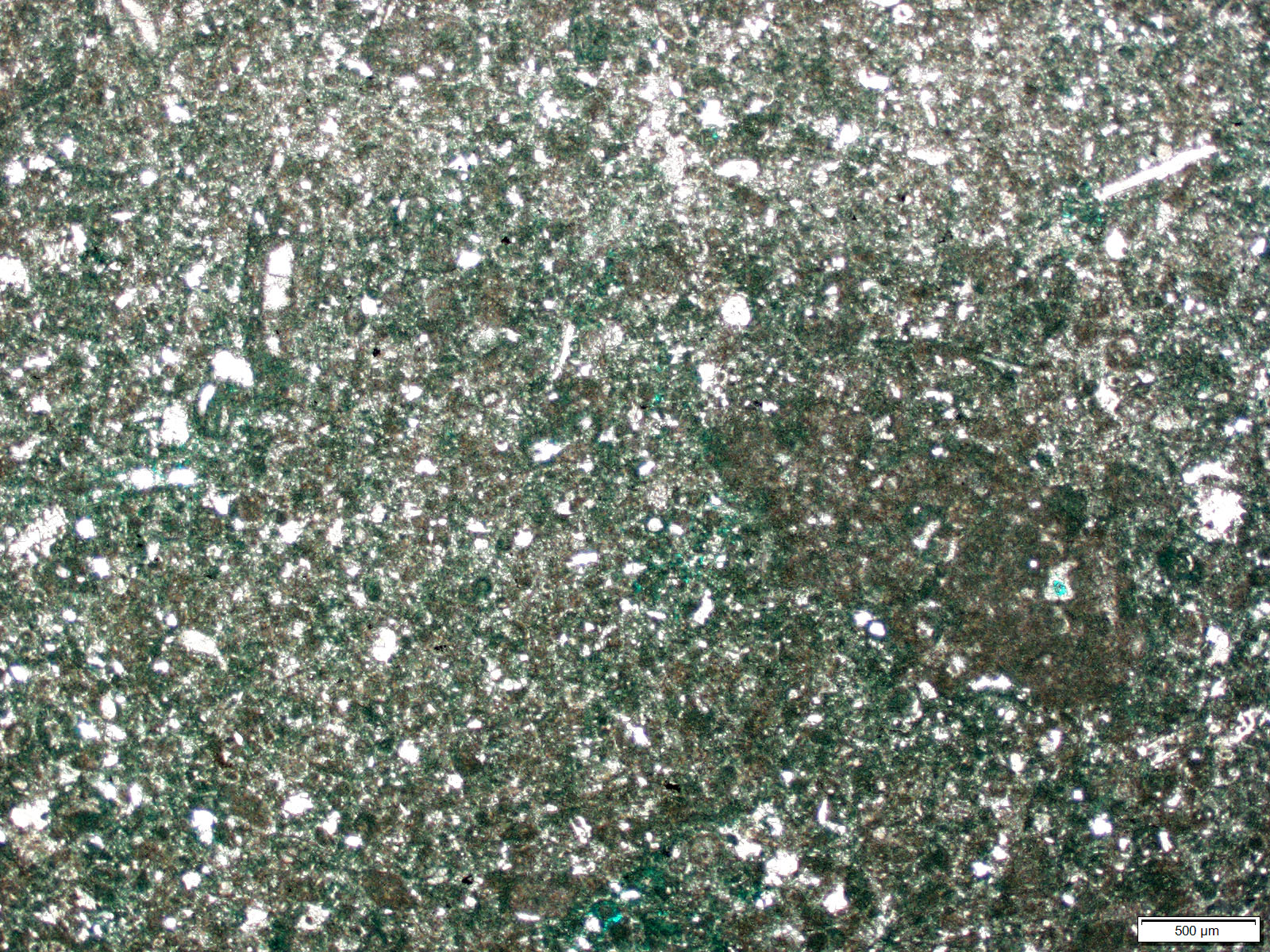
Thin section photomicrograph of a peloid packstone with fragmented bioclasts, plane polarised light.

Original Dunham classification (Dunham 1962)
Depositional texture recognizable					Depositional texture not recognizable
Original components not bound during deposition				Original components were bound during deposition	Depositional texture not recognizable
Contains mud			Lacks mud and is grain-supported	Original components were bound during deposition	Depositional texture not recognizable
Mud-supported		Grain-supported	Lacks mud and is grain-supported	Original components were bound during deposition	Depositional texture not recognizable
Less than 10% grains	More than 10% grains	Grain-supported	Lacks mud and is grain-supported	Original components were bound during deposition	Depositional texture not recognizable
Mudstone	Wackestone	Packstone	Grainstone	Boundstone	Crystalline Carbonate

=== Modification by Embry and Klovan (1971) ===
Following the publication of the original Dunham Classification System a number of modifications were proposed. The most widely adopted of these has been that of Embry and Klovan (1971) who recognized that the Dunham classification scheme lacked detail when it came to the description of organically-bound and coarse-grained limestones.

Embry and Klovan proposed the subdivision of the Dunham 'boundstone' category on the basis of the means by which the sediment was organically-bound, thus yielding three new classes within the Dunham boundstone class:

Bafflestone
autochthonous organically baffled sediments
Bindstone
matrix-supported sediments that have been stabilized by encrustation and binding
Framestone
sediments with a rigid fossil-supported framework

Recognising that the identification of these structures is problematic at the limited scale of a petrographic thin section and typically requires examination of outcrop exposures or core, Embry and Klovan stated that where the mode of binding is not identifiable then the original Dunham classification term boundstone should be retained.

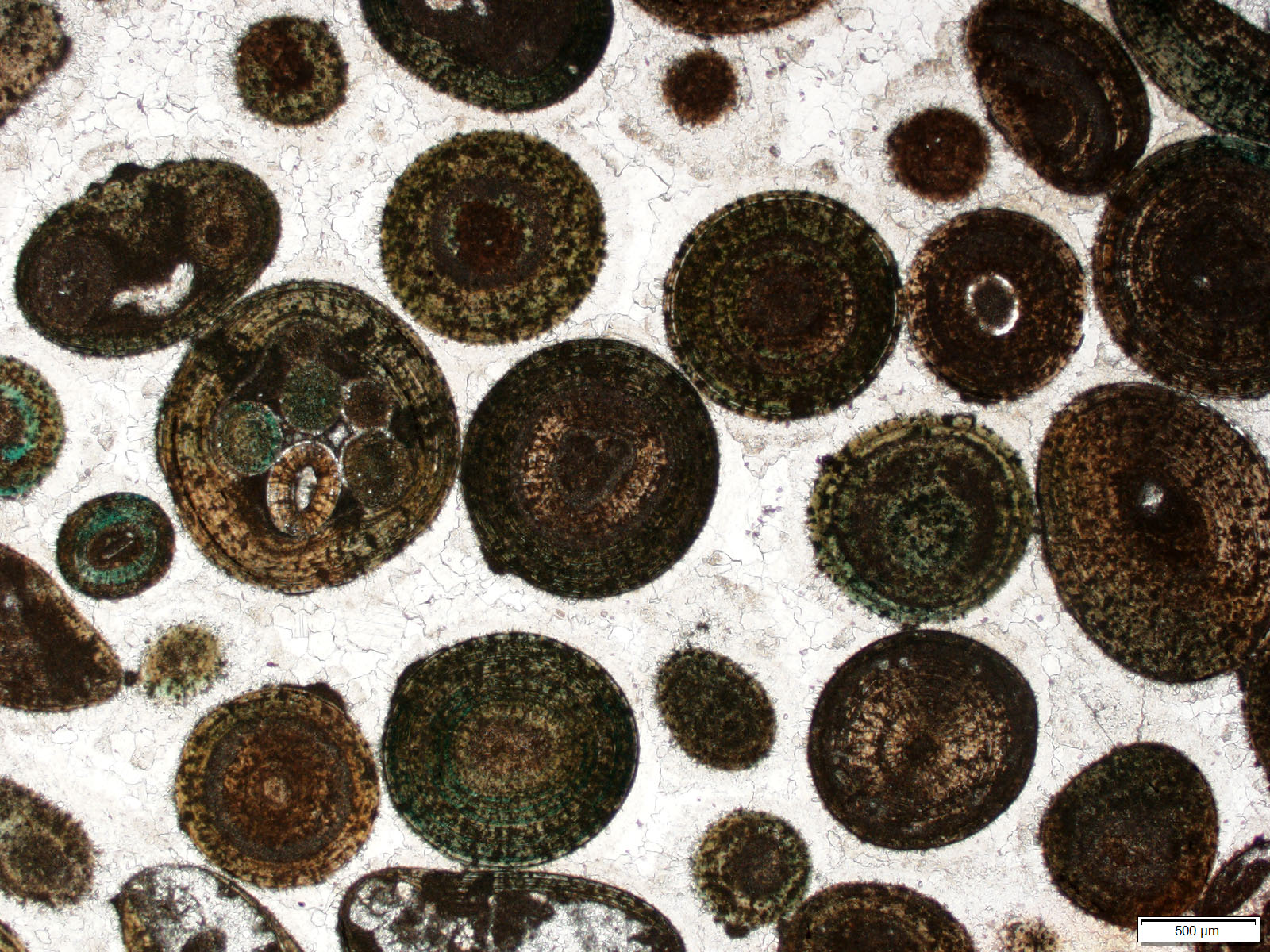
Thin section photomicrograph of a calcite cemented ooid grainstone, plane polarised light.

To address the issue of coarse-grained allochthonous limestones (lithologies where >10% of the components are >2 mm in diameter), Embry and Klovan proposed the introduction of two further new classes:

Rudstones
textures where the >2 mm grain-size fraction supports the framework
Floatstones
matrix-supported textures with the >2 mm grains appearing to 'float' in a finer-grained matrix

As with the original Dunham classification, modifiers should be employed to enhance the classification. Additionally, the class names should be employed as textural modifiers to describe the matrix. Embry and Klovan also redefined 'mud matrix' as material with a diameter of <30 μm.

Following the wide adoption of the Embry and Klovan (1971) modifications, the Dunham Classification system is typically referred to as the 'modified Dunham Classification System' with both Dunham (1962) and Embry and Klovan (1971) being cited.

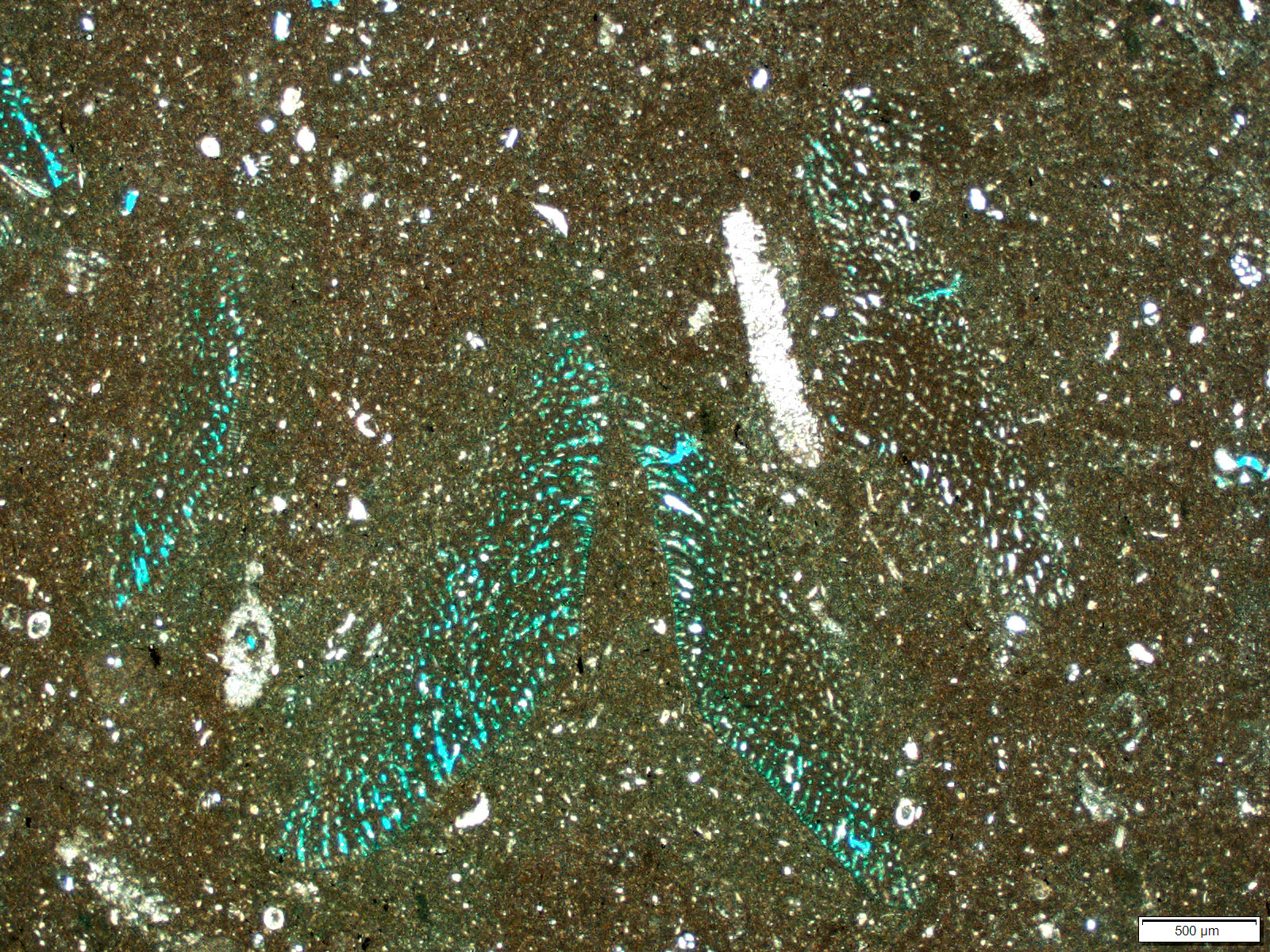
Thin section photomicrograph of Orbitolinid foraminifera floatstone with a fragmented bioclast packstone matrix, plane polarised light

It can be summarized as follows:

Modified Dunham Classification (Dunham, 1962; Embry and Klovan, 1971)
Allochthonous Limestones - No evidence that the original components were bound together at the time of deposition						Autochthonous Limestones - Original components were organically-bound during deposition		
Less than 10% of the components are > 2 mm				Greater that 10% of the components are > 2 mm		Autochthonous Limestones - Original components were organically-bound during deposition		
Contains lime mud (<30 μm)			No lime mud	Greater that 10% of the components are > 2 mm		Bound by organisms that act as baffles	Bound by organisms that encrust and bind - the rock is supported by the matrix	Bound by organisms that build a rigid framework - the rock is supported by the fossil framework
Mud-supported		Grain-supported		Matrix-supported	Grain-supported by the >2 mm size fraction	Bound by organisms that act as baffles	Bound by organisms that encrust and bind - the rock is supported by the matrix	Bound by organisms that build a rigid framework - the rock is supported by the fossil framework
Less than 10% grains (>30 μm - 2 mm)	Greater than 10% grains (>30 μm - 2 mm)	Grain-supported		Matrix-supported	Grain-supported by the >2 mm size fraction	Bound by organisms that act as baffles	Bound by organisms that encrust and bind - the rock is supported by the matrix	Bound by organisms that build a rigid framework - the rock is supported by the fossil framework
Mudstone	Wackestone	Packstone	Grainstone	Floatstone	Rudstone	Bafflestone	Bindstone	Framestone

.

== Revised classification by Wright (1992) ==
A revised classification was proposed by Wright (1992). It adds some diagenetic patterns and can be summarized as follows:

Revised Dunham classification (Wright 1992)
Depositional				Biological			Diagenetic			
Matrix-supported (clay and silt grade)		Grain-supported		In situ organisms			Non-obliterative			Obliterative
Less than 10% grains	More than 10% grains	With matrix	No Matrix	Encrusting binding organisms	Organisms acted to baffle	Rigid organisms dominant	Main component is cement	Many grain contact as microstylolithes	Most grain contacts are microstylolithes	Crystals larger 10 micrometers
Calci-mudstone	Wackestone	Packstone	Grainstone	Boundstone	Bafflestone	Framestone	Cementstone	Condensed grainstone	Fitted grainstone	Sparstone
	Components larger 2 mm									Crystals smaller 10 micrometers
	Floatstone	Rudstone								Microsparstone
