= Wackestone =

Mud-supported carbonate rock that contains greater than 10% grains

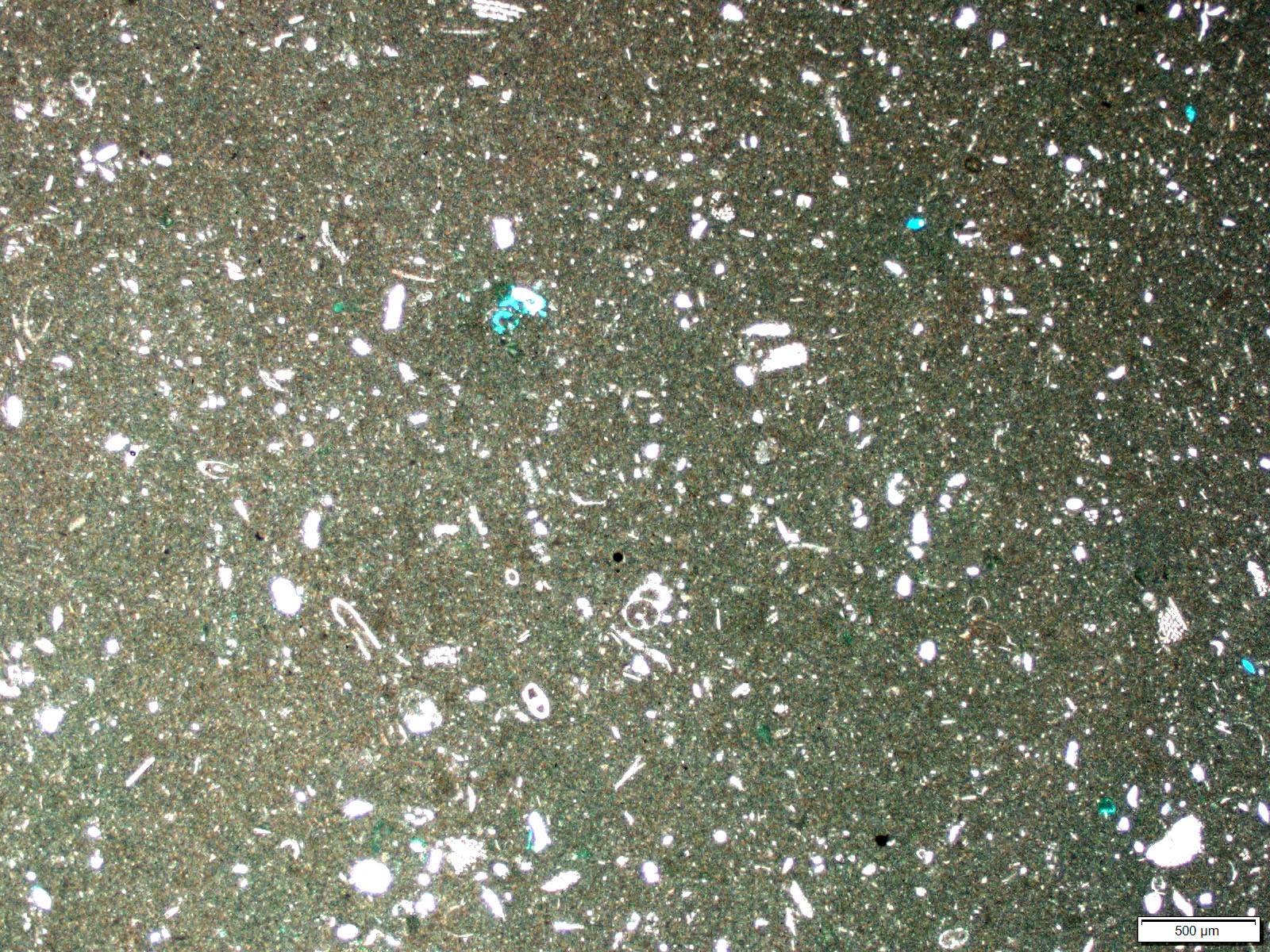
Fragmented bioclastic wackestone

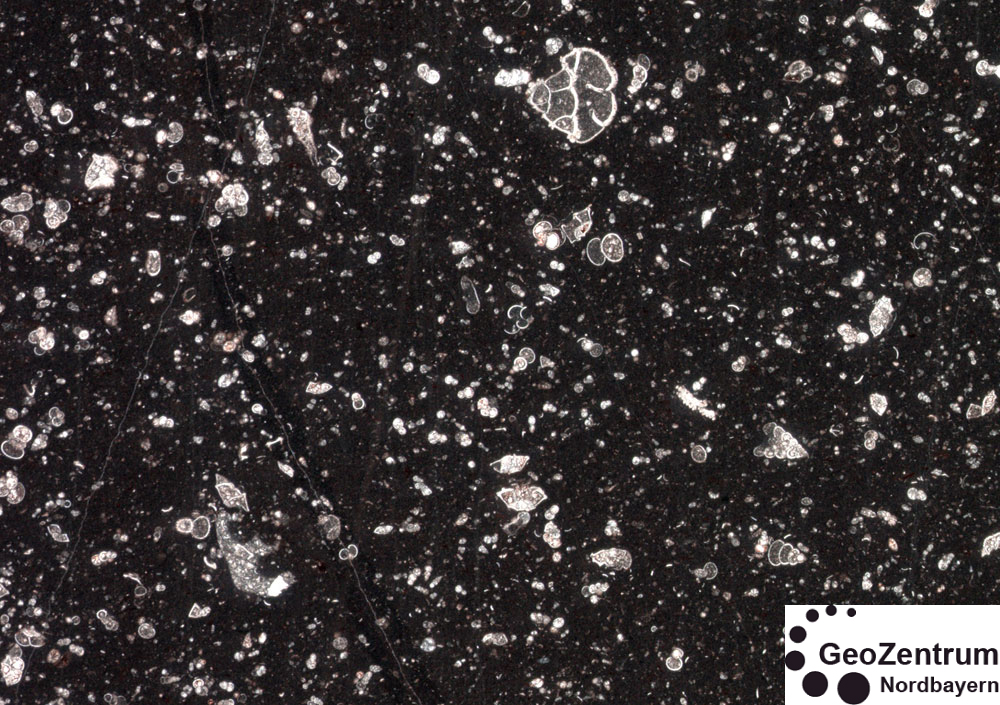
A Wackestone in thin section (width of image is 10 mm)

Under the Dunham classification (Dunham, 1962) system of limestones, a wackestone is defined as a mud-supported carbonate rock that contains greater than 10% grains. Most recently, this definition has been clarified as a carbonate-dominated rock in which the carbonate mud (<63 μm) component supports a fabric comprising 10% or more very fine-sand grade (63 μm) or larger grains but where less than 10% of the rock is formed of grains larger than sand grade (>2 mm).

== The identification of wackestone ==
Schematic wackestone as seen in thin section under the petrographic microscope. Type of carbonaceous rock according to the depositional texture: Alloctonous carbonates – Original components not bound at the deposition time. Less than 10% of components larger than sand size (> 2 mm) Contains carbonate mud (micrite, silt/clay size <63 μm) Fabric supported by carbonate mud (micrite, <63 μm) 10% or more composed of 63 μm or greater grains Legend: Dotted background: micritic matrix. Curved blue particles: bioclasts (indeterminate fossils, e.g. bivalve fragments). Blue cones: bioclasts (e.g. fossils of gastropods) Black spheroids: bioclasts (pellets).

A study of the adoption and use of carbonate classification systems by Lokier and Al Junaibi (2016) highlighted that the most common problem encountered when describing a wackestone is to incorrectly estimate the volume of 'grains' in the sample – in consequence, misidentifying wackestone as mudstone or vice versa. The original Dunham classification (1962) defined the matrix as clay and fine-silt size sediment <20 μm in diameter. This definition was redefined by Embry & Klovan (1971) to a grain size of less than or equal to 30 μm. Wright (1992) proposed a further increase to the upper limit for the matrix size in order to bring it into line with the upper limit for silt (62 μm).

== See also ==
- Wacke
