= Rudstone =

Type of carbonate rock

Rudstone is a type of carbonate rock. It is a kind of coquina.

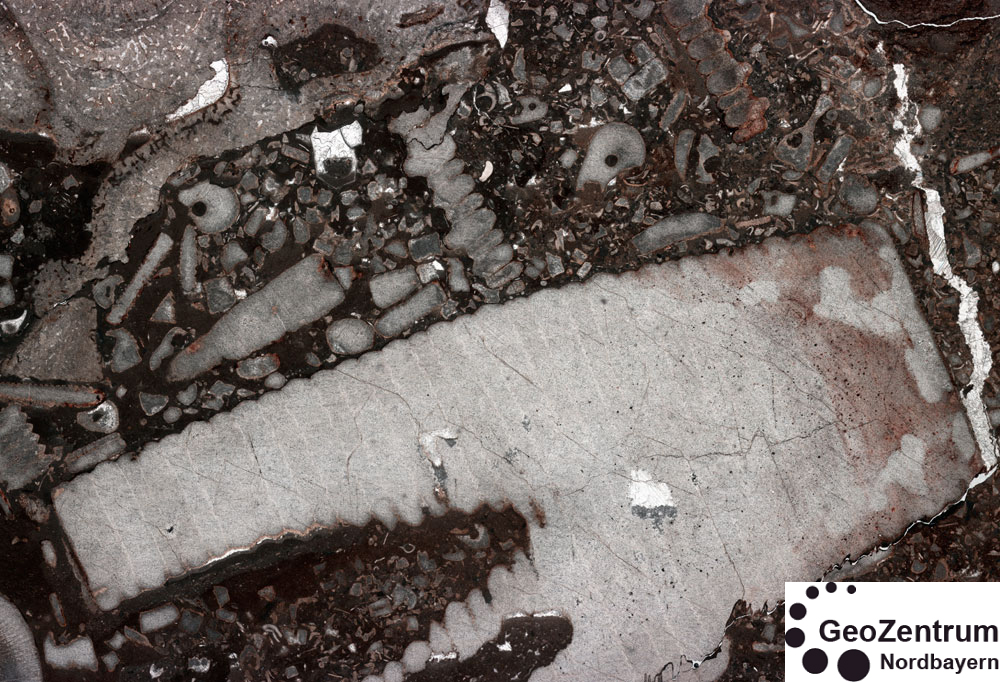
Rudstone with micrite. Width of picture is 36mm

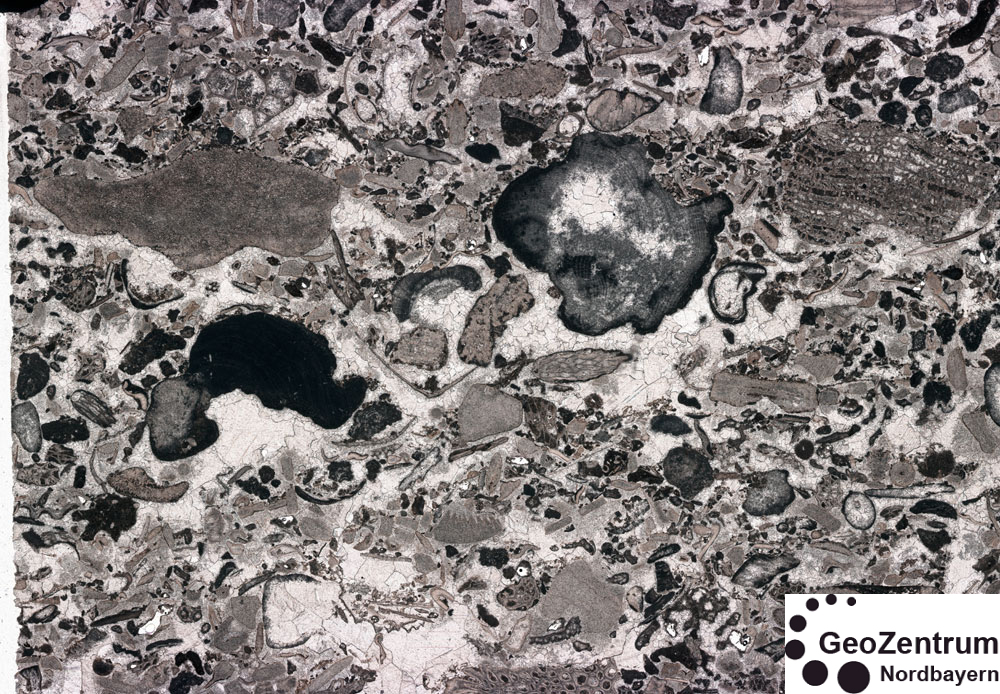
Rudstone with sparite. Width of picture is 36mm

The Dunham classification (Dunham, 1962) did not consider grain size as a criterion for the description of carbonate lithologies. In an attempt to rectify this perceived deficiency, Embry & Klovan (1971) introduced the terms rudstone (grain supported) and floatstone (matrix supported) for coarse-grained allochthonous carbonates. Following a survey of the use of the Dunham classification, Lokier and Al Junaibi (2016) clarified the definition of a rudstone as "a carbonate-dominated rock where more than 10% of the volume is comprised of grains larger than 2 mm and these grains support the fabric of the rock."
