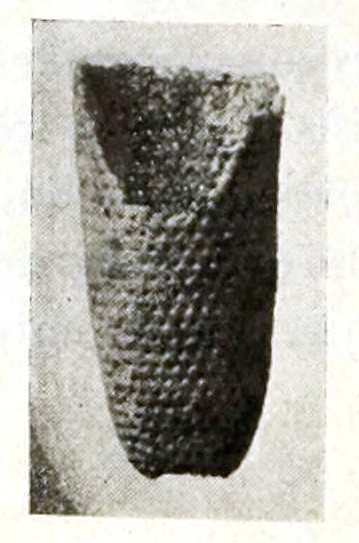
- Zittelina elegans

Scientific classification
- Clade: Viridiplantae
- Division: Chlorophyta
- Class: Ulvophyceae
- Order: Dasycladales
- Family: Dasycladaceae
- Genus: †Zittelina; E.Munier-Chalmas ex L.Morellet & J.Morellet, 1913

= Zittelina (alga) =

Zittelina is a fossil genus of algae belonging to the family Dasycladaceae.

Species:

- Zittelina elegans Munier-Chalmas ex L.Morellet & J.Morellet
- Zittelina hexagonalis Munier-Chalmas
