= Floatstone =

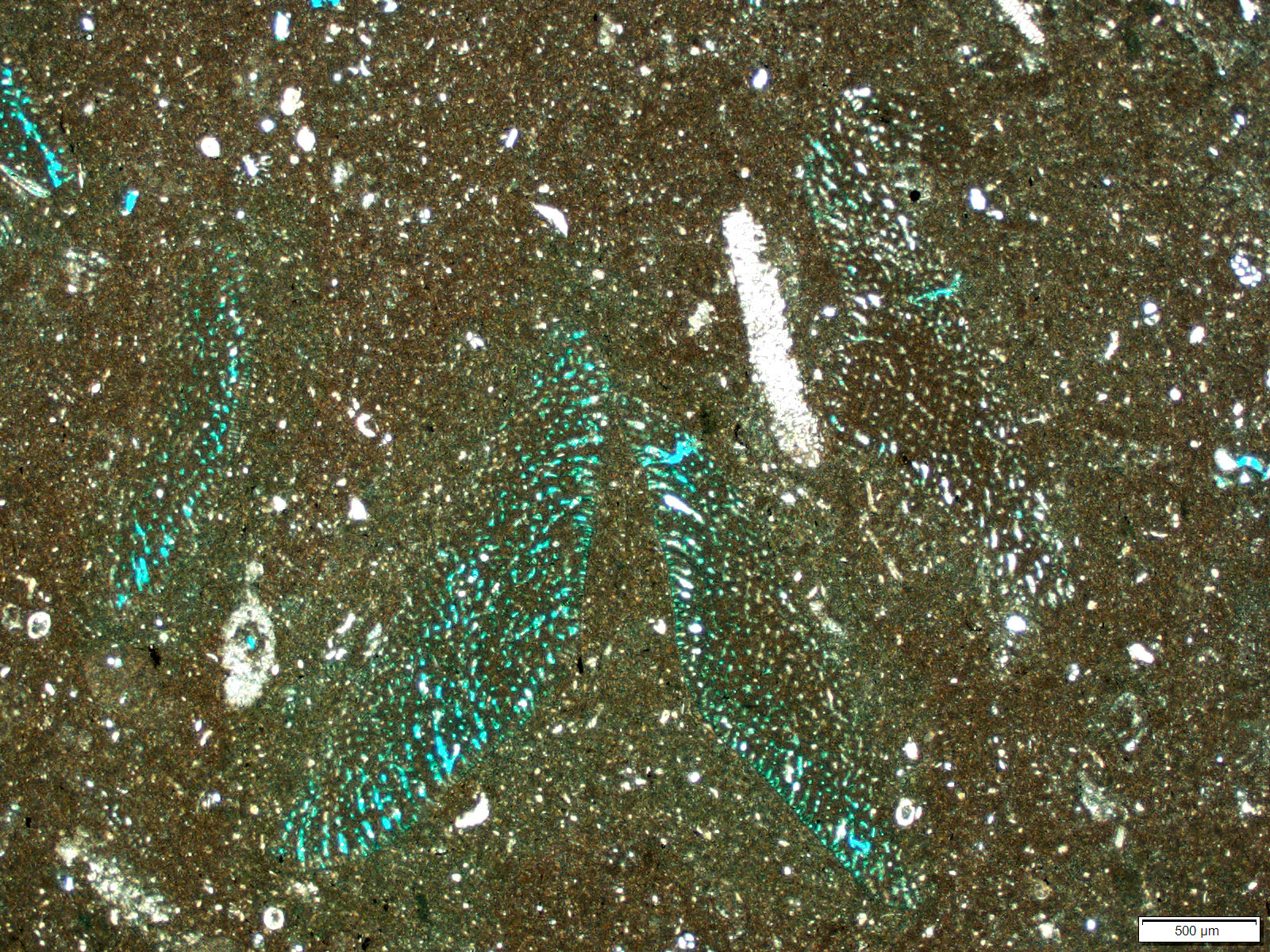
Thin section photomicrograph of Orbitolinid foraminifera floatstone with a fragmented bioclast packstone matrix, plane polarised light

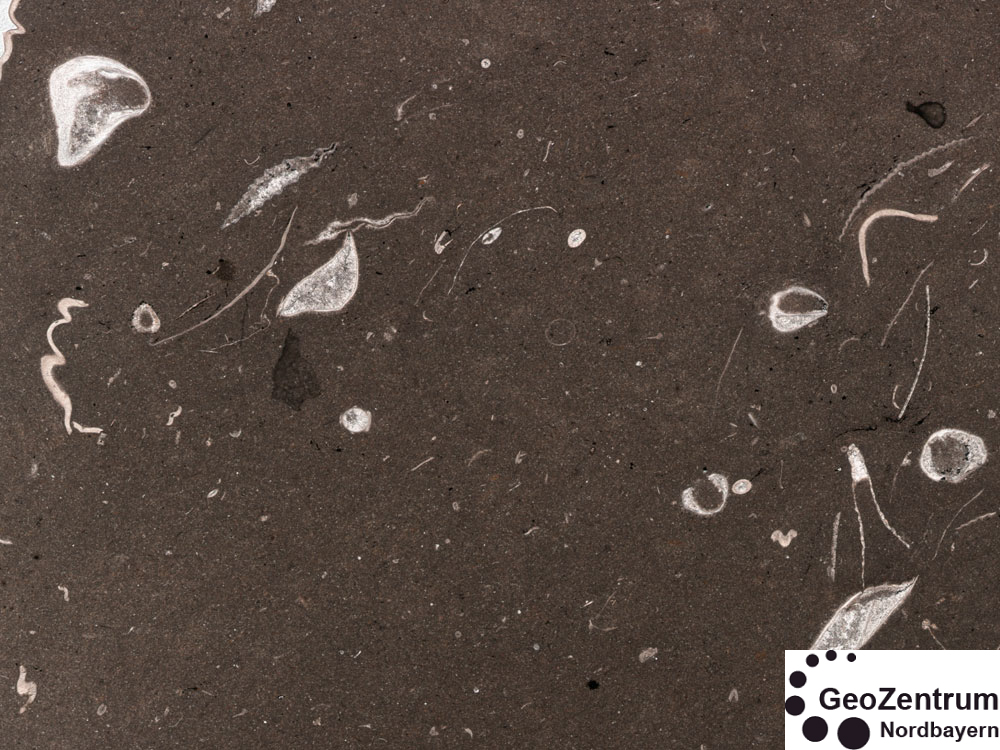
A Floatstone: few, but relatively large components in micritic matrix (width of picture is 20 mm)

Floatstone is a type of carbonate rock.

The original Dunham classification (Dunham, 1962) of limestones did not consider the separate classification of coarse grained carbonate lithologies. In an attempt to rectify this, Embry & Klovan (1971) introduced the terms rudstone (grain supported) and floatstone (matrix supported) for coarse-grained allochthonous limestones. This definition of a floatstone was most recently clarified as "a carbonate-dominated rock where more than 10% of the volume is grains larger than 2 mm and the fabric is supported by the component that is 2 mm and smaller".
