= Carbonate rock =

Class of sedimentary rock

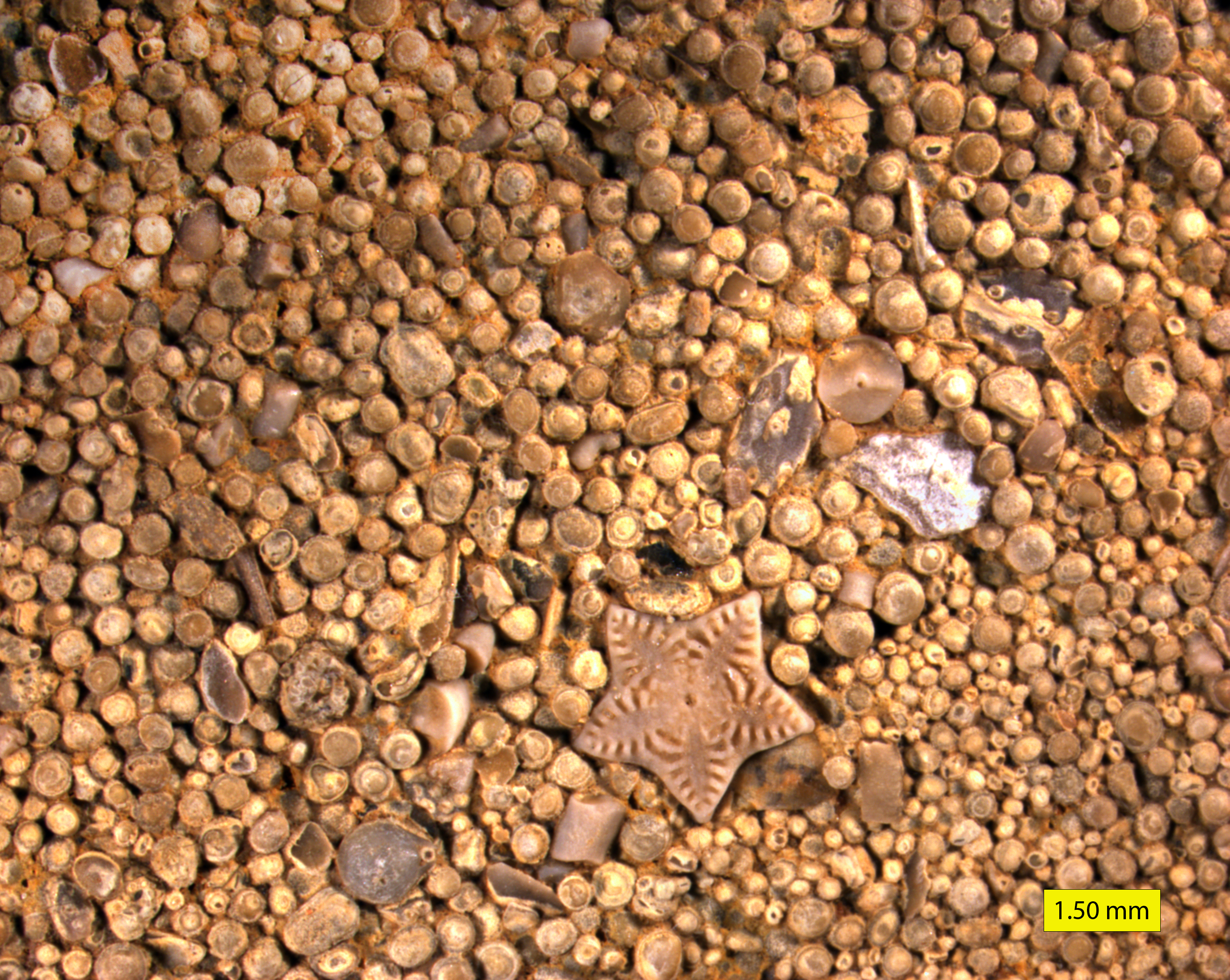
Carbonate ooids on the surface of a limestone; Carmel Formation (Middle Jurassic) of southern Utah, USA. Largest is 1.0 mm in diameter.

Carbonate rocks are a class of sedimentary rocks composed primarily of carbonate minerals. The two major types are limestone, which is composed of calcite or aragonite (different crystal forms of CaCO_{3}), and dolomite rock (also known as dolostone), which is composed of dolomite (CaMg(CO_{3})_{2}). They are usually classified on the basis of texture and grain size. Importantly, carbonate rocks can exist as metamorphic and igneous rocks, too. When recrystallized carbonate rocks are metamorphosed, marble is created. Rare igneous carbonate rocks even exist as intrusive carbonatites and, even rarer, there exists volcanic carbonate lava.

Carbonate rocks are also crucial components to understanding geologic history due to processes such as diagenesis in which carbonates undergo compositional changes based on kinetic effects. The correlation between this compositional change and temperature can be exploited to reconstruct past climate as is done in paleoclimatology. Carbonate rocks can also be used for understanding various other systems as described below.

== Limestone ==
Limestone is the most common carbonate rock and is a sedimentary rock made of calcium carbonate with two main polymorphs: calcite and aragonite. While the chemical composition of these two minerals is the same, their physical properties differ significantly due to their different crystalline form. The most common form found in the seafloor is calcite, while aragonite is more found in biological organisms.

=== Calcite ===
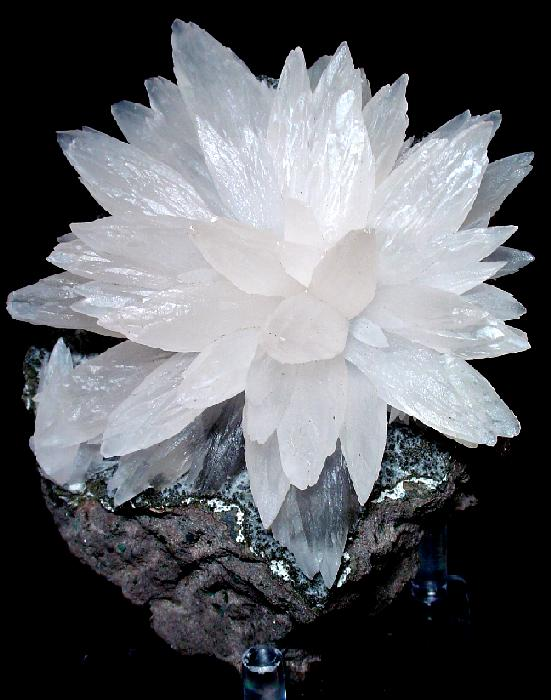
Calcite crystals from Irai, Brazil.

Calcite can be either dissolved by groundwater or precipitated by groundwater, depending on several factors including the water temperature, pH, and dissolved ion concentrations. Calcite exhibits an unusual characteristic called retrograde solubility in which it becomes less soluble in water as the temperature increases. When conditions are right for precipitation, calcite forms mineral coatings that cement the existing rock grains together or it can fill fractures.

=== Aragonite ===
Compared to calcite, aragonite is less stable and more soluble, and can thus be converted to calcite under certain conditions. In solution, magnesium ions can act as promoters of aragonite growth as they inhibit calcite precipitation. Often this inhibited precipitation occurs in biology where organisms aim to precipitate calcium carbonate for their structural features such as for skeleton and shells.

== Dolostone ==
The discovery of dolomite rock, or dolostone, was first published in 1791 and has been found across the Earth's crust from various different time periods. Because the rock is made of calcium, magnesium, and carbonate ions, the mineral crystalline structure can be visualized similar to calcite and magnesite. Due to this composition, the dolomite mineral present in dolostone can be classified by varying degree of calcium inclusion, and occasionally iron, too.

=== Calcian dolomite ===
Calcium-rich dolomite, or calcian dolomite, is dolomite which has more calcium than magnesium in its mineral form. This is the most common form of dolomite found naturally and artificially from synthesis. This dolomite, when formed in the oceans, can prove to be metastable. The resultant structure of this mineral presents minimal differences from regular dolomite likely as a result of formation after initial crystal growth.

=== Ferroan dolomite / ankerite ===
Iron-rich dolomite, or ferroan dolomite, is dolomite which contains significant trace levels of iron. Due to the similar ionic radii of iron(II) and magnesium, iron(II) can easily substitute magnesium to form ferroan dolomite; manganese can also substitute this atom. The result can be defined as ankerite. The exact delineation between which minerals are considered ferroan dolomite and which are ankerite is unclear. Ankerite with the "pure" CaFe(CO_{3})_{2} chemical formula has yet to be found in nature.

== Significance ==
Carbonate rocks are significant for both human understanding of Earth's atmospheric and geologic history, in addition to providing humans with significant resources for current civilizational endeavors such as concrete.

=== Limestone and concrete ===
Limestone is often used in concrete as powder due to its cheap cost. During the formation of concrete, however, breakdown of limestone releases carbon dioxide and contributes significantly to the greenhouse effect. There is significant amount of research studying the ideal quantity of calcium carbonate (derived from limestone) in concrete and if other compounds can be used to provide the same economic and structural integrity benefits.

=== Paleoclimatology from carbonate minerals ===
Many forms of paleoclimatology exist whereby carbonate rocks can be used to determine past climate. Corals and sediments are well-known proxies for these reconstructions. Corals are marine organisms with calcium carbonate skeletons (rocks) which grow specific to oceanic conditions at the time of growth. Diagenesis refers to the process whereby sediments are being converted to sedimentary rock. This includes biological activity, erosion, and other chemical reactions. Due to the strong correlation between diagenesis and seawater temperature, coral skeletons can be used as proxies for understanding past climate effects. Specifically, the ratio of Strontium to Calcium in the aragonite of coral skeleton can be used, alongside other proxies like oxygen isotopic ratios, to reconstruct climate variability when the coral was growing. This is because Strontium will sometimes substitute for Calcium in the calcium carbonate molecule depending on temperature effects.

Similar to the concept for using compositional changes in coral skeletons as proxies for climate conditions, compositional changes in marine sediments can be used for the same purpose (and more). The changes in trace metal ratios from carbonate minerals found here can be used to determine patterns from parent [carbonate] rocks, too.

== See also ==
- Dunham classification
- Folk classification
- Sinkhole
