= Geology of Nauru =

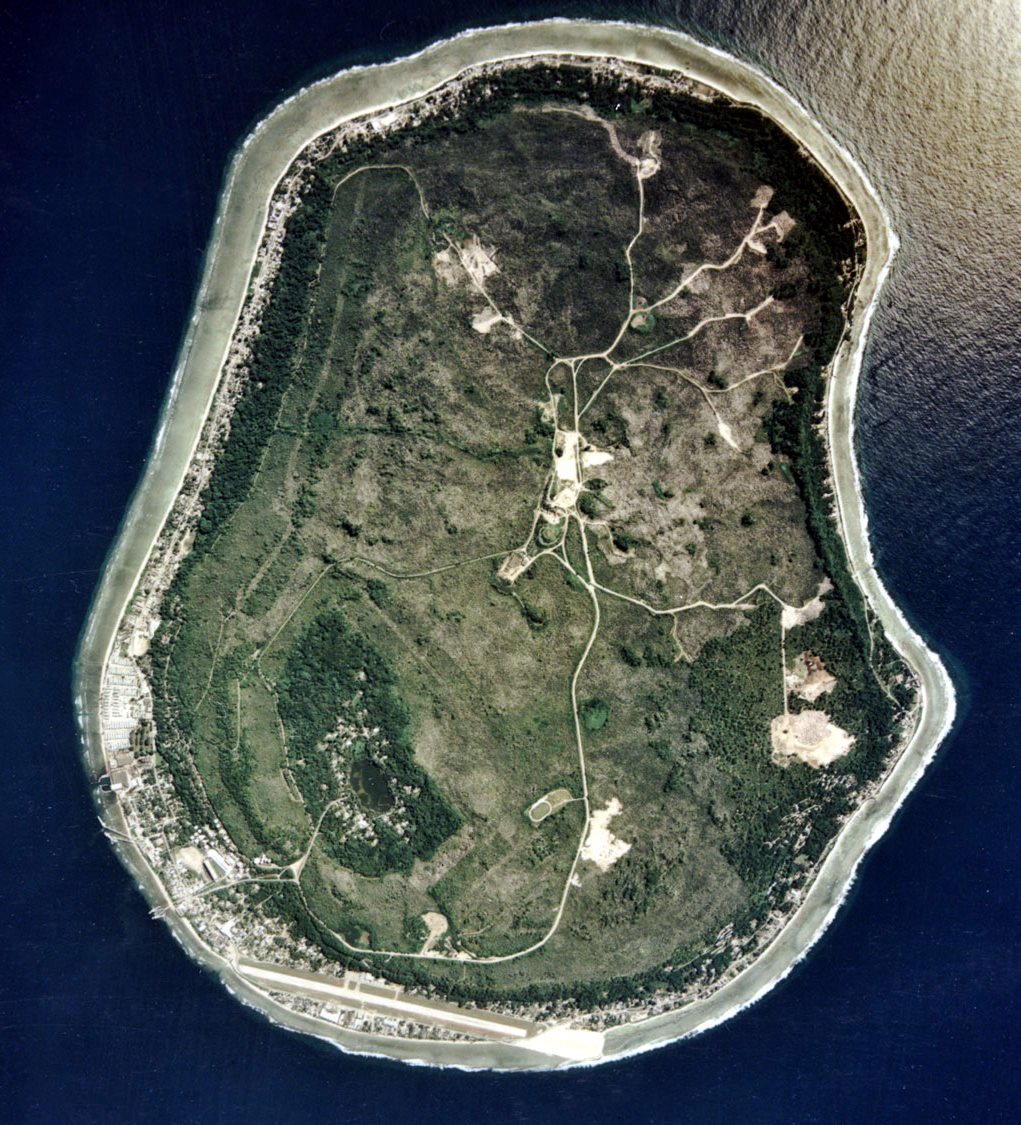
An aerial image of Nauru in 2002. Anabare Bay is on the east side. Buada Lagoon is the darker region in the south west.

Nauru is positioned in the Nauru Basin of the Pacific Ocean, on a part of the Pacific Plate that formed at a mid oceanic ridge at 132 Ma. From mid Eocene (35 Ma) to Oligocene times a submarine volcano built up over a hotspot, and formed a seamount composed of basalt. The seamount rises over 4300 m above the ocean floor. This hotspot developed simultaneously with a major Pacific Plate reorganisation.

The volcano was eroded to sealevel and a coral atoll grew on top to a thickness of about 500 m. Coral near the surface has been dated from 5 to 0.3 Ma. The original limestone has been dolomitised by magnesium from sea water. The coral was raised above sea level about 30 m, and is now a dolomite limestone outcrop which was eroded in classic karst style into pinnacles up to 20 m high. To at least a depth of 55 m below sea level, the limestone has been dissolved forming cavities, sinkholes and caves.

The island was a seabird rookery and depressions on the surface of the island were filled by a phosphate rich guano layer up to several metres thick.

Anibare Bay was formed by the underwater collapse of the east side of the volcano. The collapse formed an amphitheatre shape with the arc shaped block rotating outwards at its base from about 900 to 1100 m below sea level. Below 1100 m the slip bulges out down to 2000 m deep. In Ijuw District to the north of the bay there are lineaments trending inland to the north west. Buada Lagoon was formed by solution of the limestone when the sea level was lower, followed by collapse.

Nauru is moving at 104 mm per year to the north west along with the underlying Pacific Plate.

Streams and rivers do not exist in Nauru. Water is gathered from roof catchment systems. Water is brought to Nauru as ballast on ships returning for loads of phosphate.

Fresh water can be found in Buada Lagoon, and also in some brackish ponds at the escarpment base in Ijuw and Anabar in the northeast. There is an underground lake called Moqua Well in Moqua Caves in the southeast of the island.

== See also ==
- Phosphate mining in Nauru
