= Bikini Atoll =

Coral atoll in the Marshall Islands

Bikini Atoll Pikinni Atoll, Eschscholtz Atoll
- Atoll
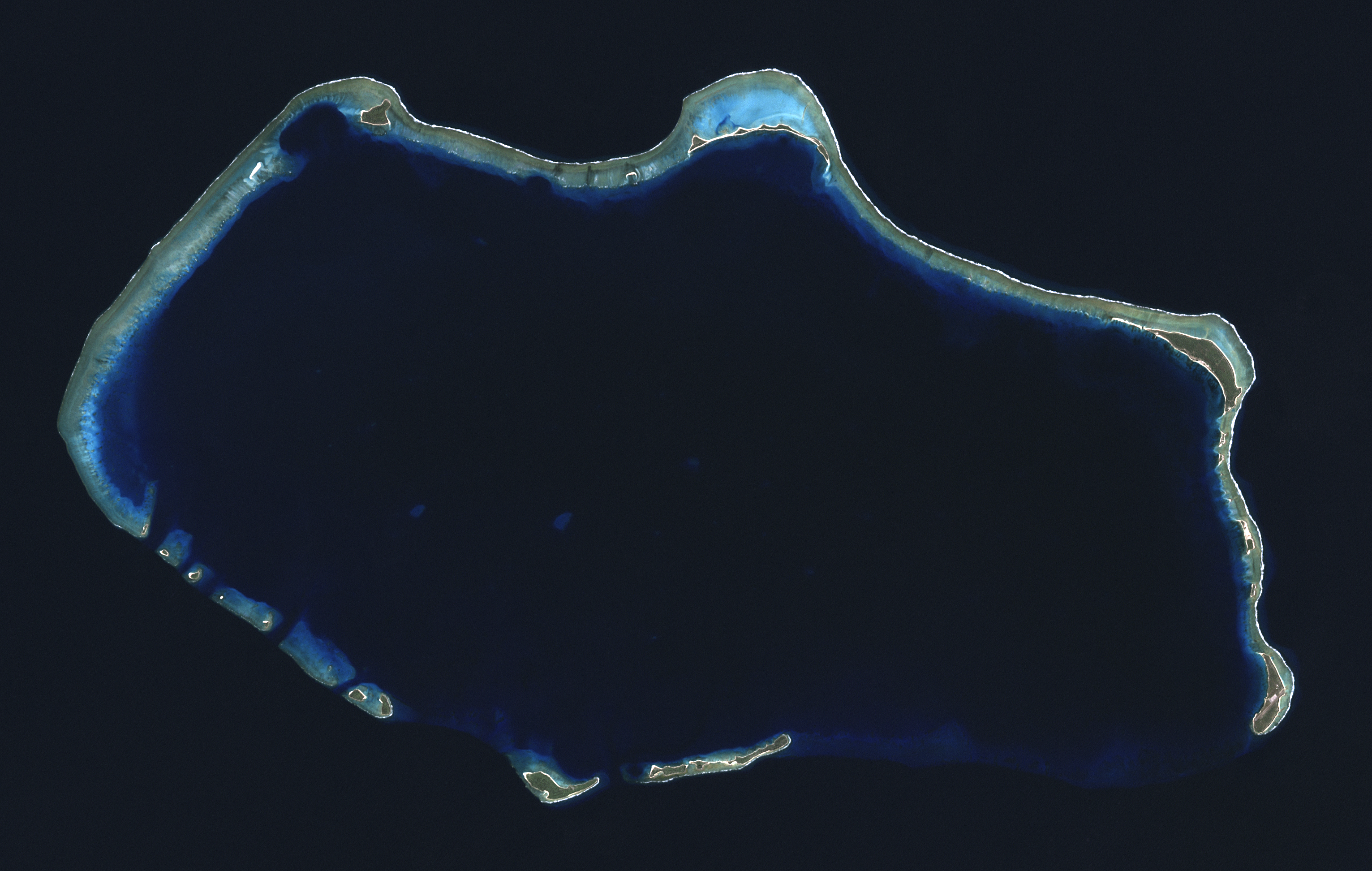
- Bikini Atoll. Two craters from high-yield atomic bomb tests can be seen on the northwest cape of the atoll, adjacent to Namu island. The larger is from the 15 Megaton Bravo shot, with the smaller 11 Megaton Romeo crater adjoining it.

- Flag Seal
- Nickname: Kili
- Motto: Men otemjej rej ilo bein anij (Marshallese) (English: Everything is in the hands of God)
- Anthem: Ij Jab Ber Emol (Marshallese) (English: No longer can I stay) (official) The Star Spangled Banner (English) (official)
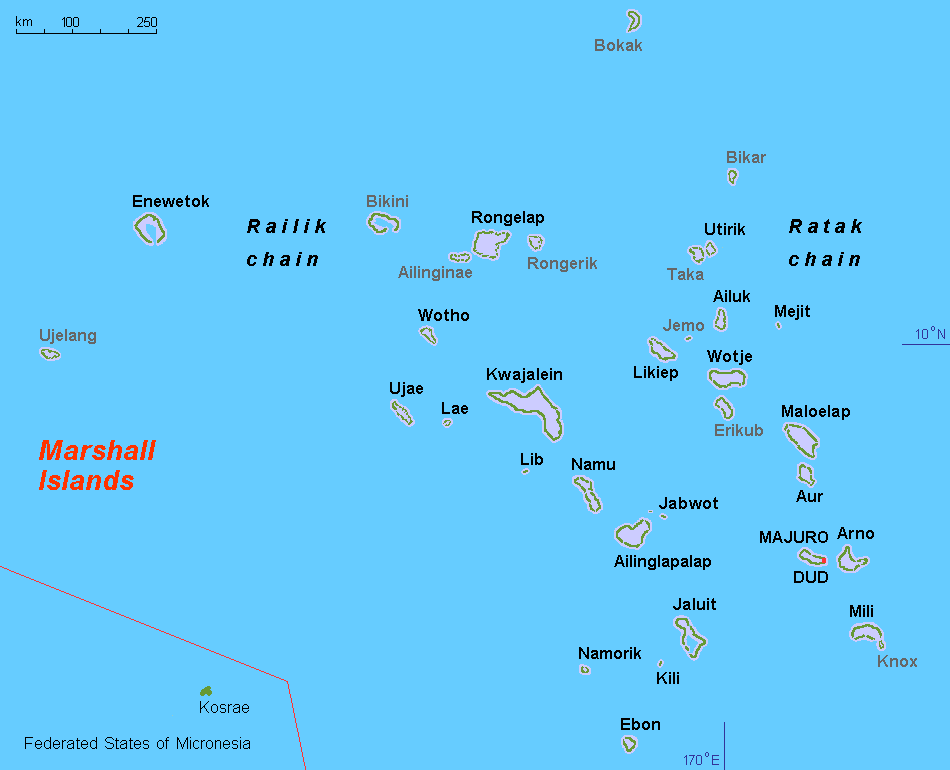
- Map of the Marshall Islands showing Bikini Atoll

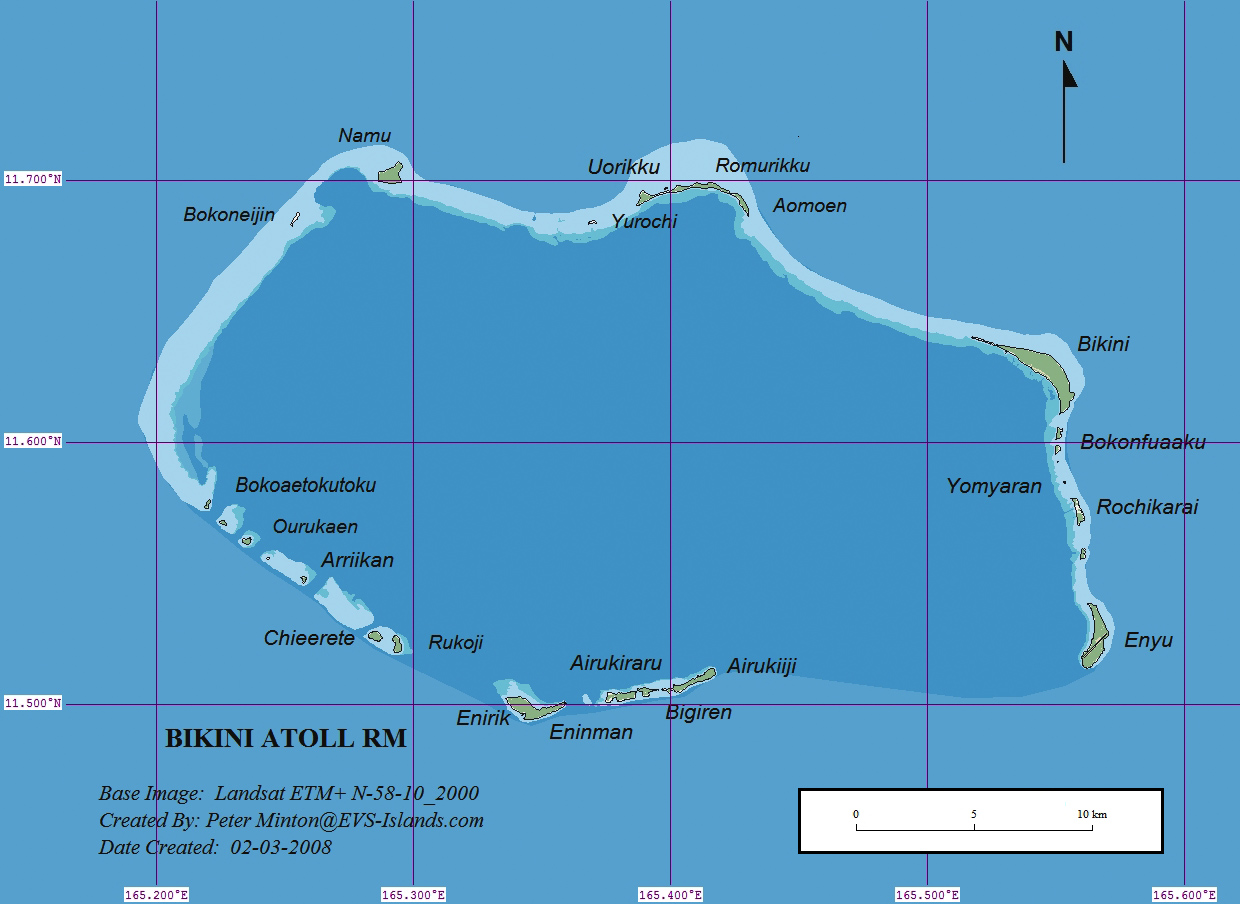
- Map of Bikini Atoll

- Location of Bikini Atoll Bikini Atoll (Pacific Ocean)
- Coordinates: 11.6°N 165.4°E
- Country: Marshall Islands

Area
  - Land: 6.0 km^{2} (2.3 sq mi)

Population (2020)
  - Total: 5
- Population relocated in 1946; Resettled population evacuated in 1978

UNESCO World Heritage Site
- Official name: Bikini Atoll Nuclear Test Site
- Criteria: Cultural: iv; vi
- Reference: 1339
- Inscription: 2010 (34th Session)

Bikini Atoll (/ˈbɪkɪni/ BIK-in-ee or /bɪˈkiːni/ bih-KEE-nee; Marshallese: Pikinni [pʲiɡinnʲi], lit. 'Coconut place'), known as Eschscholtz Atoll between the 19th century and 1946, is a coral reef in the Marshall Islands consisting of 23 islands surrounding a 229.4-square-mile (594.1 km^{2}) central lagoon. The atoll is at the northern end of the Ralik Chain, approximately 530 miles (850 km) northwest of the capital Majuro.

After the Second World War, the atoll was chosen by the United States as a nuclear weapon testing site. The 167 people who lived on Bikini were forcefully relocated by the U.S. military in preparation for testing. In 1946, the Bikini population moved to Rongerik, a small island east of Bikini Atoll, but it did not have adequate resources to support them. The islanders began experiencing starvation by early 1948, and were moved to Kwajalein Atoll. The U.S. used Bikini Atoll for the fourth detonation of a nuclear bomb, and carried out 22–23 additional nuclear tests there until 1958, when it was discovered that the fallout from testing was much more dangerous than previously thought. To this day, the Bikini islanders are prohibited from returning to Bikini Atoll due to nuclear contamination. However, there are some signs of recovery as the amount of radiation slowly decreases.

In 1972, about 100 residents were voluntarily returned to their home island. Scientists later found dangerously high levels of strontium-90 in well water in May 1978, and the residents' bodies were carrying abnormally high concentrations of caesium-137. They were evacuated again in September 1978. The atoll is occasionally visited today by divers and a few scientists, and it is occupied by a handful of caretakers. The people of the atoll, which now number in the thousands, have spread out to other Marshallese islands and the United States. A multi-million dollar trust fund, which had been supporting services for many Bikini inhabitants since the 1980s, was drained in the late 2010s.

In the 21st century, the atoll is a World Heritage Site, remembered for its role in the Cold War and the post-nuclear age. It is noted as an enclave of nature, and the radiation has decreased enough that tourism is possible. However, the lingering radioactive contamination makes it unfit to return to from what was expected to be short-term evacuation, especially as it is not recommended to eat plants or wildlife.

== Etymology ==
The island's English name is derived from the German colonial name Bikini given to the atoll when it was part of German New Guinea. The German name is transliterated from the Marshallese name for the island, Pikinni, ([pʲiɡinnʲi]) "Pik" meaning "plane surface" and "Ni" meaning "coconut tree", or surface of coconuts.

== Culture ==
Bikini islanders' traditional lifestyle was based on cultivating plants and eating shellfish and fish. They were skilled boatbuilders and navigators, sailing the two-hulled proa to and from islets around Bikini and other atolls in the Marshall Islands. They were relatively isolated and had developed a society bound by extended family association and tradition. Every lagoon was led by a king and queen, with a following of chieftains and chief women who constituted a ruling caste.

Japan occupied the islands starting in 1914. The islanders worked the copra plantations under the watchful eye of the Japanese, who took a portion of the sales. Chiefs could retain as much as $20,000 per year, and the remainder was distributed to the workers. The Marshall islanders took pride in extending hospitality to one another, even distant relatives.

=== Clothing and dress ===
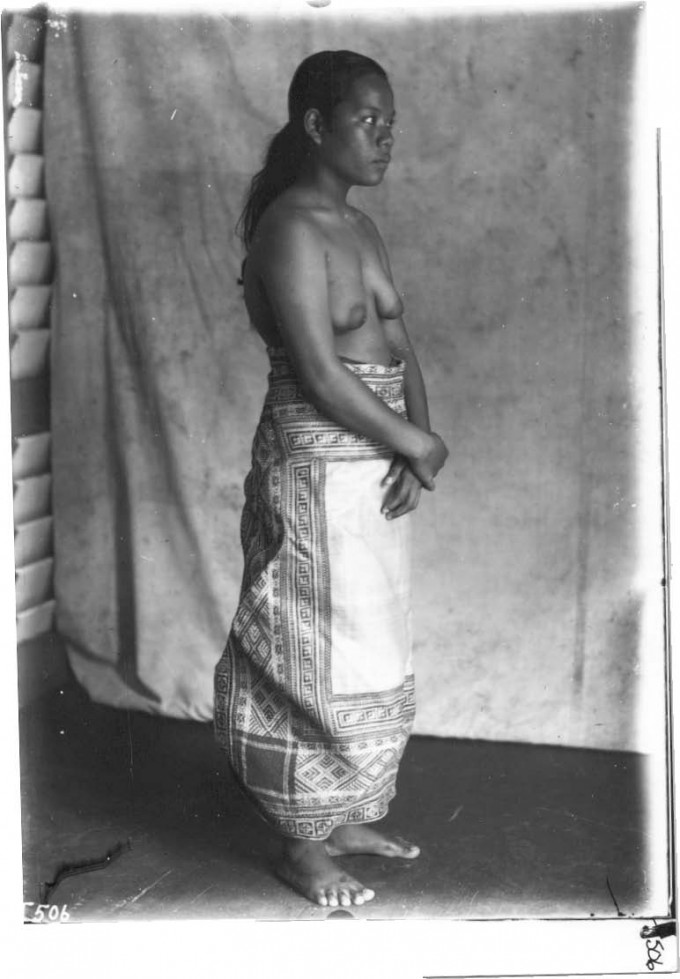
A woman named Liijabor from Likiep Island, Likiep Atoll in the Marshall Islands, wears a traditional nieded or clothing mat, c. 1918

Men traditionally wore a fringed skirt about 25 to 30 inches (60 to 80 cm) long. Women wore two mats about a yard square each, made by weaving pandanus and hibiscus leaves together and belted around the waist. Children were usually naked. Christian missionaries from Oʻahu arrived in the late 19th century and influenced the islanders' notions of modesty. They introduced a dress for women which was a long, wide, loose-fitting gown with long sleeves and a high neck, intended to cover as much skin as possible. The dress is called wau ([wɑːu]), from the name of the Hawaiian island of Oahu.

It is customary to remove one's shoes or sandals when taking a seat at someone's home. Marshallese women traditionally cover their thighs as well. Women generally wear cotton muʻumuʻus or similar clothing that covers most of the body. Personal health is not often discussed except within the family, and women are especially private about female-related health issues, although they are willing to talk about their breasts.

Marshallese women swim in muʻumuʻus made of a fine polyester that quickly dries. In the capital of Majuro, revealing cocktail dresses are not considered appropriate for both islanders and guests. With the increasing influence of Western media, the younger generation wears shorts, though the older generation equates shorts with loose morals. T-shirts, jeans, skirts, and makeup are making their way to the islands via the media.

=== Land-based wealth ===
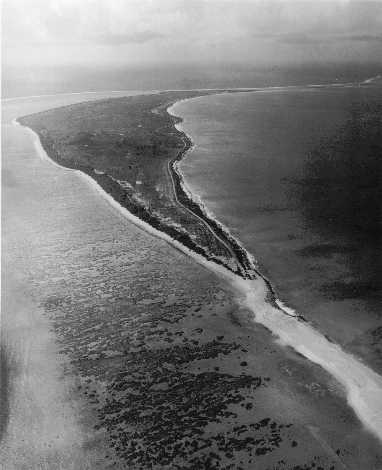
Island of the Bikini Atoll

The Bikini islanders continue to maintain land rights as the primary measure of wealth.

To all Marshallese, land is gold. If you were an owner of land, you would be held up as a very important figure in our society. Without land you would be viewed as a person of no consequence... But land here on Bikini is now poison land.

Each family is part of a clan (Bwij), which owns all land. The clan owes allegiance to a chief (Iroij). The chiefs oversee the clan heads (Alap), who are supported by laborers (Dri-jerbal). The Iroij control land tenure, resource use and distribution, and settle disputes. The Alap supervise land maintenance and daily activities. The Dri-jerbal work the land including farming, cleaning, and construction.

The Marshallese society is matrilineal and land is passed down from generation to generation through the mother. Land ownership ties families together into clans. Grandparents, parents, grandchildren, aunts, uncles, and cousins form extended, close-knit family groups. Gatherings tend to become big events. One of the most significant family events is the first birthday of a child (kemem), which relatives and friends celebrate with feasts and song.

Payments made in the 20th century as reparations for damage to the Bikini Atoll and the islanders' way of life have elevated their income relative to other Marshall Island residents. It has caused some Bikini islanders to become economically dependent on the payments from the trust fund. This dependency has eroded individuals' interest in traditional economic pursuits like taro and copra production. The move also altered traditional patterns of social alliance and political organization. On Bikini, rights to land and land ownership were the major factor in social and political organization and leadership. After relocation and settlement on Kili, a dual system of land tenure evolved. Disbursements from the trust fund were based in part to land ownership on Bikini and based on current land tenure on Kili.

Before the residents were relocated, they were led by a local chief and under the nominal control of the Paramount Chief of the Marshall Islands. Afterward, they had greater interaction with representatives of the trust fund and the U.S. government and began to look to them for support.

In the late 2010s, the islanders pushed for complete control of the trust fund, which was tens of millions of dollars. The same leaders which had pushed for increased control, rang up huge bills in travel expenses, buying real estate, aircraft, and boats. In 2016, the Bikini trust fund stood at $71 million in its last audit, with $4 million have been withdrawn. After leasing control, the account was drained leaving only $4 million by 2020, and $100,000 in 2023. Then with funds depleted, the power and deliveries to Kili were stopped, and salaries were not paid, this led to declaration of emergency, and the Marshallese government had to step in to try to help.

=== Language ===
Most Marshallese speak both the Marshallese language and another language. Some of the languages reflect the nation's history with Germany, Japan, and the United States. Government agencies use Marshallese, though English is very popular also.

== Environment ==
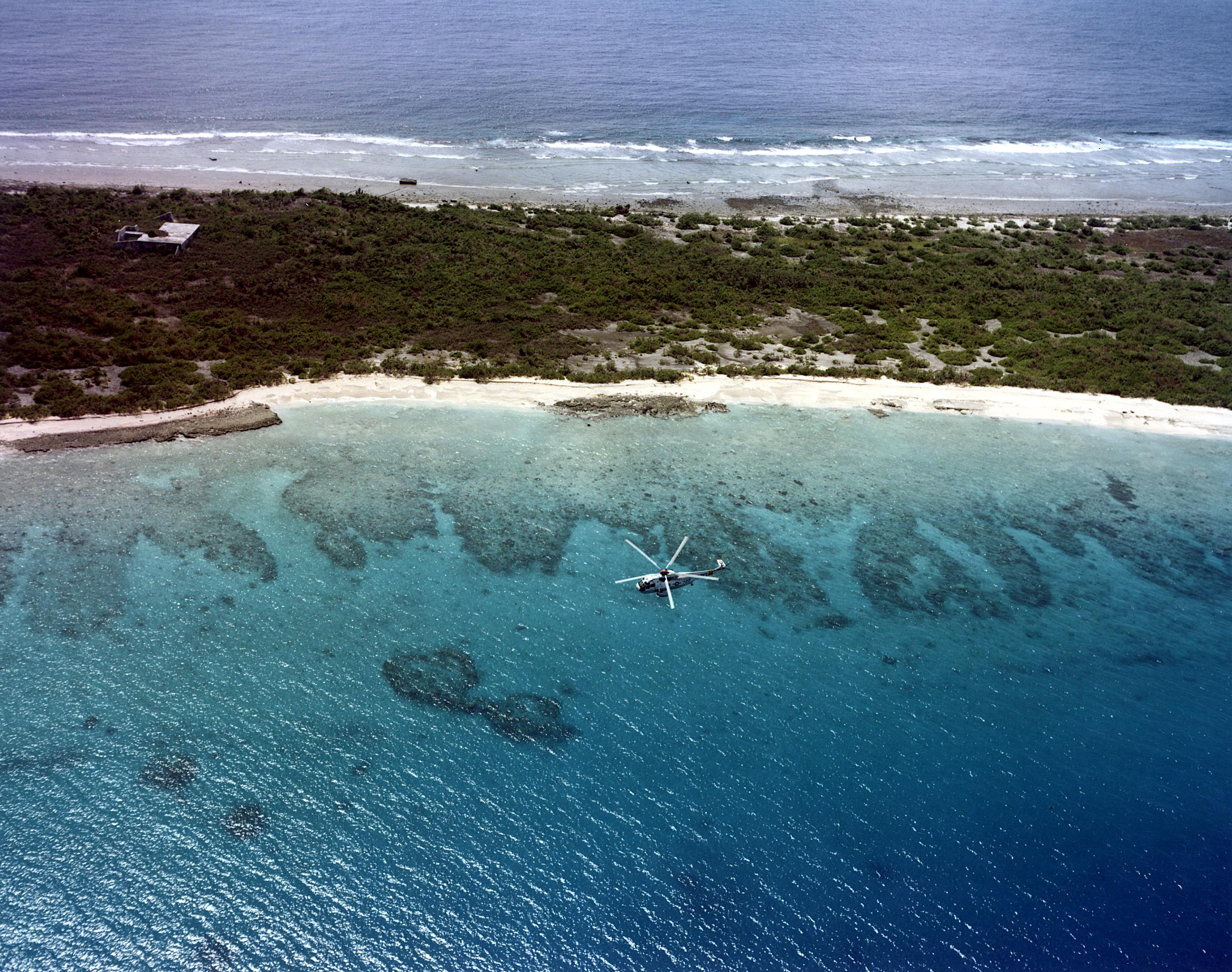
Vegetation on Bikini Atoll

Bikini Atoll is part of the Ralik Chain (for "sunset chain") within the Marshall Islands.

=== Nuclear test site ===
The United States detonated 23 nuclear devices between 1946 and 1958 at seven test sites on the reef, inside the atoll, in the air, and underwater. They had a combined yield of about 77 Mt. The testing began with the Operation Crossroads series in July 1946. The residents initially accepted resettlement voluntarily to Rongerik Atoll, believing that they would be able to return home within a short time. However, Rongerik could not produce enough food, and the islanders starved. They could not return home, so they were relocated to Kwajalein Atoll for six months before choosing to live on Kili Island, a small island one-sixth the size of their home island. Some were able to return to Bikini Island in 1972; however, further testing revealed dangerous levels of strontium-90. They eventually moved to other atolls in the Marshall Islands and the United States, due to problems with this plan.

In 1954, the Castle Bravo nuclear test took place on Bikini Atoll, with a yield of 15 Mt. This nuclear test was only one out of 67 (Note: There is a discrepancy related to the total number of tests conducted: 66 or 67. The total number is 67, but two tests (HARDTACK I SCAEVOLA and HARDTACK I QUINCE) were with zero yield: one was a safety test, the other did not work out. And sometimes one of them doesn't count. Another source of this discrepancy is the widely cited article by Simon and Robison, the summary of which lists the total number of tests conducted in the Marshall Islands as 66 (23 at Bikini Atoll + 42 at Enewetak Atoll + 1 between the atolls), although the attached table lists data for all 67 tests (23 + 43 + 1).) total nuclear tests launched on the surrounding Marshall Islands and reefs. The nuclear radiation and fallout that followed the Castle Bravo test alone was substantial enough to discourage future habitation of the islands. Consequently, Bikini Atoll was subject to initial radioactive testing of soil composition and well water. Nuclear fallout deposits were tested in order to estimate how much area of the island was impacted by radionuclides and caesium-137 specifically. The technology used to measure the estimated amount of nuclear fallout deposit was known as HYSPLIT. This technology used meteorological sciences to model and map out nuclear fallout depositions of caesium-137 on the Marshall Islands. Initial fallout cloud debris, radionuclide particles, and actual caesium-137 particles were all estimated during nuclear testing. This data was then compared with past radiological testing results collected by HYSPLIT to predict total nuclear fallout deposition of caesium-137 on island soil.

The United States government established several trust funds which as of 2013 covered medical treatment and other costs and paid about $550 annually to each individual.

=== Geography ===
Some 46 miles (74 km) northwest of the atoll is Wōdejebato, a probable shield volcano that is connected to it through a submarine ridge.

There are 23 islands in the Bikini Atoll; the islands of Bokonijien, Aerokojlol and part of Namu were destroyed during the nuclear tests. The islands are composed of low coral limestone and sand. The average elevation is only about 7 feet (2.1 m) above low tide level. The total lagoon area is 229.4 square miles (594 km^{2}). The primary home of the islanders was the most northeast and largest islet, Bikini Island, totaling 586 acres (237 ha) and 2.5 miles (4.0 km) long.

=== Flora and fauna ===
The islanders cultivated native foods including coconut, pandanus, papaya, banana, arrowroot, taro, limes, breadfruit, and pumpkin. A wide variety of other trees and plants are also present on the islands. After the completion of nuclear tests, the islands of Bikini and Enyu were replanted with coconut trees in a square grid pattern, each 30 feet (9.1 meters) apart.

The islanders were skilled fishermen. They used fishing line made from coconut husk and hooks from sharpened sea shells. They used more than 25 methods of fishing. The islanders raised ducks, pigs, and chickens for food and kept dogs and cats as pets. Animal life in the atoll was severely affected by the atomic bomb testing. Existing land species include small lizards, hermit crabs, and coconut crabs. The islands are frequented by a wide variety of birds.

To allow vessels with a larger draft to enter the lagoon and to prepare for the atomic bomb testing, the United States used explosives to cut a channel through the reef and to blow up large coral heads in the lagoon. The underwater nuclear explosions carved large holes in the bottom of the lagoon that were partially refilled by blast debris. The explosions distributed vast amounts of irradiated, pulverized coral and mud across wide expanses of the lagoon and surrounding islands. As of 2008, the atoll had recovered nearly 65% of the biodiversity that existed prior to radioactive contamination, but 28 species of coral appear to be locally extinct.

The radioactive contamination has prevented humans from fishing these grounds, and for that reason, there is an abundance of marine wildlife in the waters around the atoll, much larger than in other parts of the ocean. Coconut crabs are particularly abundant on the island.

=== Climate ===
The islands are hot and humid. The temperature on Bikini Atoll is 27 to 29 °C (81 to 84 °F) year-round. The water temperature is also 27 to 29 °C (81 to 84 °F) all year. The islands border the Pacific typhoon belt. The wet season is from May to December while the trade winds from January through May produce higher wave action.

== Resident and non-resident population ==
During WWII, the atoll had been occupied by Japanese troops, and American naval ships, ground artillery, and B-24 Liberator bombers attacked the island, killing many of the 8,000 soldiers.

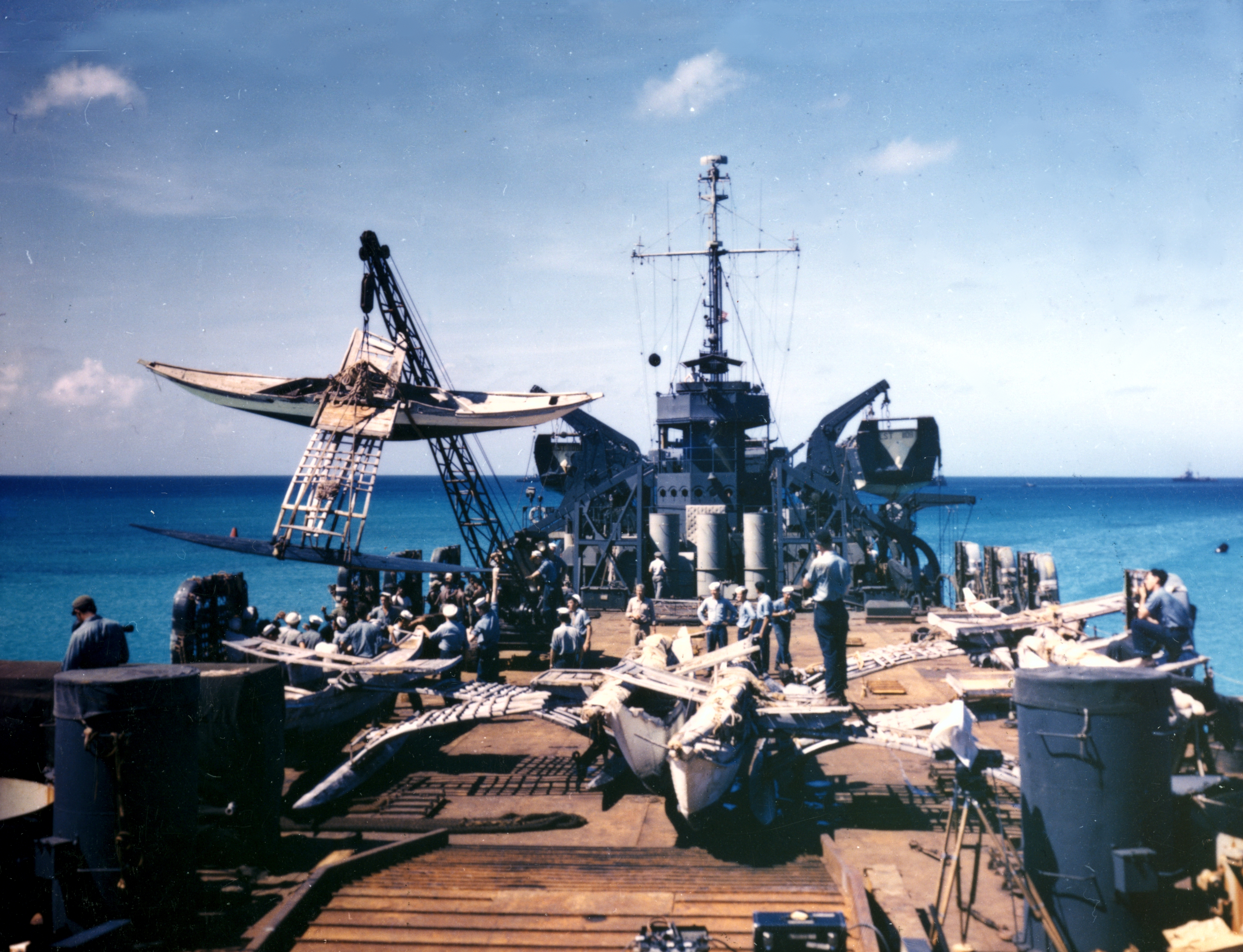
Bikini islander canoes are loaded for their relocation.

When the United States got the islanders to relocate in 1946, 19 islanders lived elsewhere. The 167 residents, comprising about 40 families who lived on the atoll, moved to Rongerik Atoll. The islands were able to produce much less food than they had on Bikini, and there were far fewer fish in the waters. By early 1948, the people were close to starvation. U.S. investigators concluded they must be moved, and they were relocated to Kwajalein Atoll. They were first evacuated to Kwaj, where the islanders lived in tents adjacent to the concrete runway in use by the U.S. Navy for six months while a new and better location was selected. Finally, Kili Island was chosen.

They were moved once again in November 1948 to Kili Island, when the population numbered 184. They were later given public lands on Ejit and a few families initially moved there to grow copra. In 1972, about 100 Bikini islanders returned to live on the atoll after they were reassured that it was safe. They remained for about 6 years until scientists found an 11-fold increase in the caesium-137 body burdens and determined that the island was not safe after all. The 178 residents were evacuated in September 1978 once again.

Since then a number of descendants have moved to Majuro (the Marshall Islands' capital), other Marshall Islands, and the United States. In 1999, there were 2,600 total individuals; 1,000 islanders living on Kiji, 700 in Majuro, 275 on Ejit, 175 on other Marshall Islands or atolls, and 450 in the United States. Of those, 81 were among those who left the atoll in 1946. In 2001, the population of the dispersed islanders was 2,800. By 2013, there were about 4,880 Bikini islanders descended from the original Bikinis, with 1,250 living on Kili Island, 2,150 on Majuro (and 280 on Ejit, an island in Majuro Atoll), 350 on the other Marshall Islands, and 850 in the United States.

As of March 2016, there were 5,400 living Bikini islanders: 800 islanders living on Kili, 2,550 on Majuro, 300 on Ejit, 350 on other Marshall Islands, and 1,400 in the United States and other countries. Of that number, 25 lived on Bikini in 1946. The resident population of the atoll is currently 4–6 caretakers, including Edward Maddison, who lived on Bikini Island from 1985 to 2020. His grandfather was one of the original residents relocated in 1946. He helped the U.S. Department of Energy with soil monitoring, testing cleanup methods, mapping the wrecks in the lagoon, and accompanying visitors on dives. He was also the divemaster of Bikini Atoll Divers. Maddison died in Majuro, Marshall Islands, on March 29, 2020.

== History ==
Humans have inhabited Bikini Atoll for about 3,600 years. U.S. Army Corps of Engineers archaeologist Charles F. Streck Jr., found bits of charcoal, fish bones, shells and other artifacts under 3 feet (0.91 meters) of sand. Carbon-dating placed the age of the artifacts at between 1960 and 1650 BC. Other discoveries on Bikini and Eneu island were carbon-dated to between 1000 BC and 1 BC, and others between AD 400 and 1400 though samples may not have been collected from secure stratigraphic contexts and older driftwood samples may have affected results. The archaeological community broadly rejects the earliest radiocarbon dates (circa 1200 BCE) reported by Charles Streck for Bikini Atoll due to significant methodological flaws. The primary criticism is the "old wood effect," where samples were potentially derived from ancient driftwood logs that floated across the Pacific for centuries, skewing the dates older than the actual human activity. Furthermore, Streck failed to provide secure stratigraphic contexts or detailed records, leaving the scientific community unable to verify that the charcoal originated from undisturbed human cultural layers rather than natural deposits or erosion .

In contrast, the study conducted by Marshall Weisler on Ujae Atoll is regarded as a benchmark for establishing a reliable timeline of Marshall Islands prehistory. Weisler avoided the "old wood effect" by exclusively radiocarbon dating short-lived plant remains, specifically coconut husk, coconut shell, and pandanus keys—species that grow locally on atolls and would have been used soon after dying. His meticulous methodology, which included detailed stratigraphic profiles and secure excavation contexts, produced a consistent and accepted chronology. This evidence firmly establishes permanent human habitation in the Marshall Islands around the 1st century CE, with the oldest confirmed date at Ujae falling between AD 256–542. Consequently, while Streck’s unsubstantiated 1200 BCE claims are dismissed, Weisler’s data provides a credible foundation for understanding when and how settlers adapted to the atoll environment.

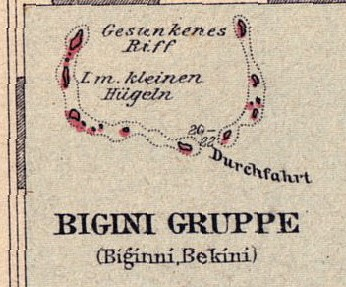
Map of Bikini Atoll, taken from the 1893 map Schutzgebiet der Marshall Inseln, published in 1897

On October 1, 1529, the Spanish ship La Florida, under the command of Álvaro de Saavedra, stopped at a lush atoll, which Saavedra called Los Jardines (English: The Gardens). The atoll may have been Bikini or Enewetak Atoll. The Spaniards went ashore and ate with the islanders. According to an account of the voyage, the feast ended abruptly when the island's chief inquired about the purpose of Saavedra's musket. When Saavedra fired it into the air, the islanders fled.

German-Russian explorer Otto von Kotzebue was the first westerner to have undisputedly seen the atoll during his 1816 and 1817 voyages. He named it Eschscholtz Atoll after Johann Friedrich von Eschscholtz, the ship's naturalist.

In 1834, the captain of a trading schooner and two of his crew members were killed at Bikini Atoll. Three vessels were sent to search for the captain, and when the Hawaiian brig Waverly discovered evidence of his death, the crew killed 30 Marshallese hostages in retaliation. Bikini and the other northern Marshall Islands had less European contact and settlement than the southern islands, but in the 1870s, several blackbirding ships kidnapped women from the northern islands to sell into sexual slavery in Fiji.

The German Empire annexed the Marshall Islands in 1885. The Germans used the atoll to produce copra oil from coconuts, although contact with the native population was infrequent. The atoll's climate is drier than the more fertile southern Marshall Islands which produced more copra. Bikini islanders were recruited into developing the copra trade during the German colonial period.

=== Japanese occupation ===
Bikini was captured along with the rest of the Marshall Islands by the Imperial Japanese Navy in 1914 during World War I and mandated to the Empire of Japan by the League of Nations in 1920. The Japanese administered the island under the South Seas Mandate, but mostly left local affairs in the hands of traditional local leaders until the start of World War II. At the outset of the war, the Marshall Islands suddenly became a strategic outpost for the Japanese. They built and manned a watchtower on the island, an outpost for the Japanese headquarters on Kwajalein Atoll, to guard against an American invasion of the islands.

=== World War II ===
The islands remained relatively unscathed by the war until February 1944, when in a bloody battle, the American forces captured Kwajalein Atoll. At the battle's conclusion, there were only five surviving Japanese soldiers left on Bikini, and they chose to die by suicide rather than allow themselves to be captured. This was followed by another difficult fight in the Battle of Eniwetok.

For the U.S., the battle represented both the next step in its island-hopping march to Japan and a significant moral victory, as it was the first time the Americans had penetrated the "outer ring" of the Japanese Pacific sphere. For the Japanese, the battle represented the failure of the beach-line defense. Japanese defenses became prepared in depth, and the battles of Peleliu, Guam, and the Marianas proved far more costly to the U.S. The base became part of the vast US Naval Base Marshall Islands.

=== Residents relocated ===
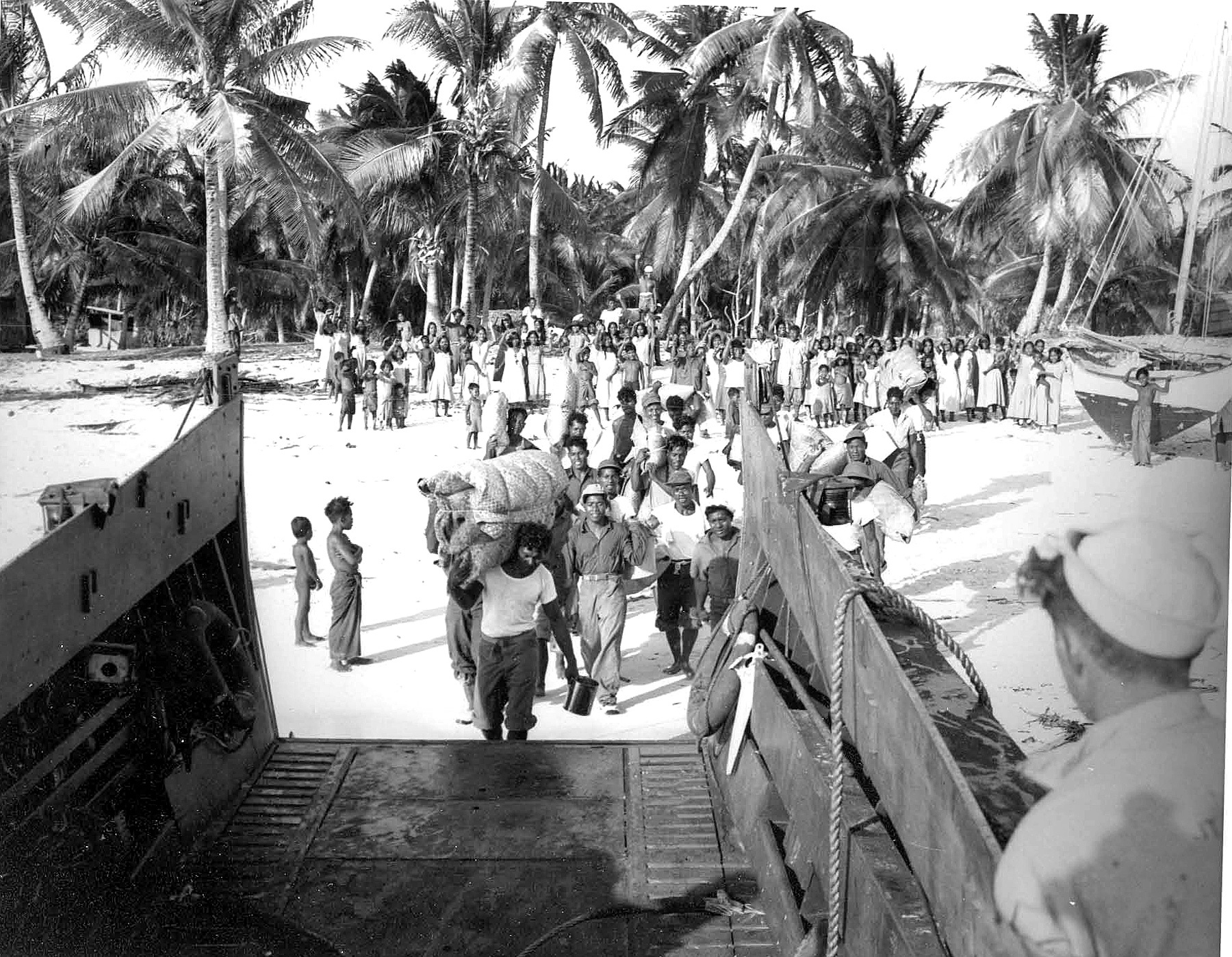
On 7 March 1946, 167 (Note: Another area of ambiguity is the number of Bikini Atoll natives who were resettled. There are sources that put the total number of settlers at 161, but the consensus seems to be 167.) Bikini Island residents boarded LST 1108 as they depart from Bikini Atoll.

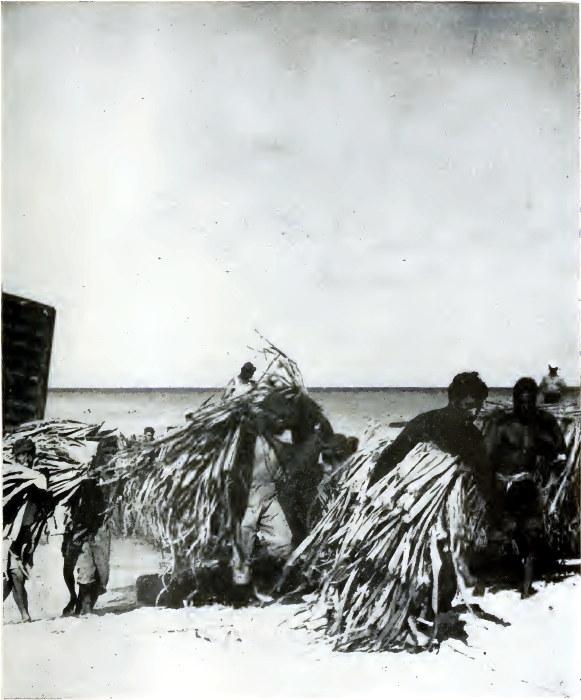
Bikini islanders arrive on Rongerik Atoll and unload pandanus for thatching the roofs of their new buildings.

After World War II, the United States was engaged in a Cold War nuclear arms race with the Soviet Union to build bigger and more destructive bombs.

The nuclear weapons testing at Bikini Atoll program was a series of 23 nuclear devices detonated by the United States between 1946 and 1958 at seven test sites. The test weapons were detonated on the reef itself, on the sea, in the air and underwater with a combined explosive yield of about 77 Mt. Shortly after World War II ended, President Harry S. Truman directed Army and Navy officials to secure a site for testing nuclear weapons on American warships. While the Army had seen the results of a land-based explosion, the Navy wanted to know the effect of a nuclear weapon on ships. They wanted to determine whether ships could be spaced at sea and in ports in a way that would make nuclear weapons ineffective against vessels.

Bikini was distant from both regular sea and air traffic, making it an ideal location. In February 1946, Navy Commodore Ben H. Wyatt, the military governor of the Marshall Islands, asked the 167 Micronesian inhabitants of the atoll to voluntarily and temporarily relocate so the United States government could begin testing atomic bombs for "the good of mankind and to end all world wars." After "confused and sorrowful deliberation" among the Bikinians, their leader, King Juda, agreed to the U.S. relocation request, announcing MEN OTEMJEJ REJ ILO BEIN ANIJ, which translates as "Everything is in God's hands." Nine of the eleven family heads, or alaps, chose Rongerik as their new home.

In February, Navy Seabees helped them to disassemble their church and community house and prepare to relocate them to their new home. On 7 March 1946, the residents gathered their personal belongings and saved building supplies. They were transported 125 miles (201 km) eastward on U.S. Navy landing ship 1108 to the uninhabited Rongerik Atoll, which was one-sixth the size of Bikini Atoll. No one lived on Rongerik because it had an inadequate water and food supply and due to deep-rooted traditional beliefs that the island was haunted by the Demon Girls of Ujae. The Navy left them with a few weeks of food and water which soon proved to be inadequate.

==== Nuclear testing program ====
The Wilson cloud from test Baker, situated just offshore from Bikini Island at top of the picture

The weapons testing began with the Operation Crossroads series in July 1946. The Baker test's radioactive contamination of all the target ships was the first case of immediate, concentrated radioactive fallout from a nuclear explosion. Chemist Glenn T. Seaborg, the longest-serving chairman of the Atomic Energy Commission, called Baker "the world's first nuclear disaster." This was followed by a series of later tests that left the islands of the atoll contaminated with enough radioactivity, particularly caesium-137, to contaminate food grown in the soil.

A third nuclear test called Charlie was called off after the first two. These were the last tests in Bikini Atoll until 1954, when it was chosen as the location for Operation Castle series. The first shot Bravo, had a higher yield than expected to due an unexpected Lithium-7 reaction. This along with freak weather occurrences caused the fallout to spread much further than anticipated, affecting neighbouring atolls and the Japanese fishing boat Daigo Fukuryū Maru.

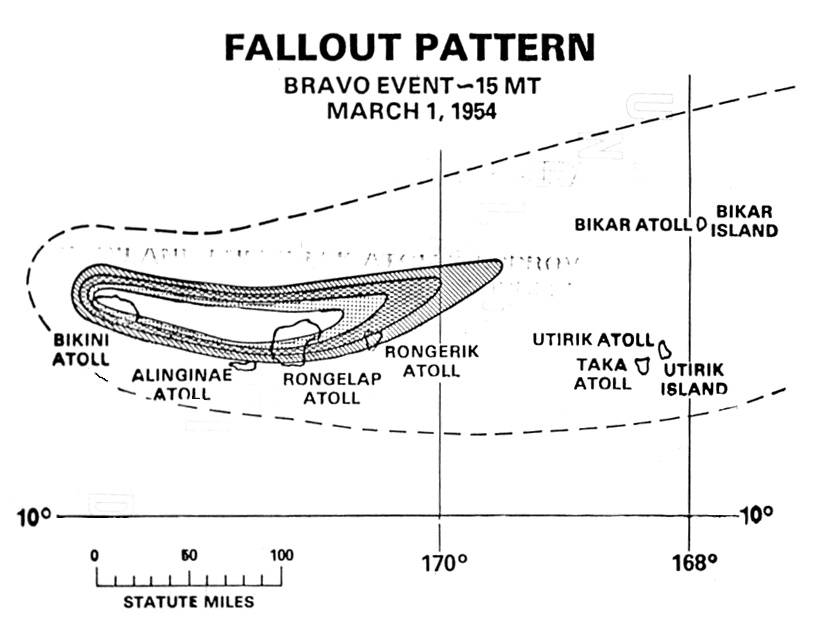
Fallout from Bravo nuclear test. The bomb yield was 15 megatons, with an expected yield of 4–8 megatons, marking it as the largest bomb detonated by the US.

Four more detonations occurred as part of the Castle series, with a combined yield of 46.5 megatons.

In 1956, Operation Redwing was conducted at the Atoll, with six total detonations and a combined yield of 18.2 megatons.

The final round of tests occurred in 1958 as part of the larger Operation Hardtack I. Eleven detonations occurred with a combined yield of 21 megatons.

==== Strategic Trust Territory ====
In 1947, the United States convinced the United Nations to designate the islands of Micronesia a United Nations Strategic Trust Territory. This was the only trust ever granted by the U.N. The United States Navy controlled the Trust from a headquarters in Guam until 1951, when the United States Department of the Interior took over control, administering the territory from a base in Saipan. The directive stated that the United States should "promote the economic advancement and self-sufficiency of the inhabitants, and to this end shall... protect the inhabitants against the loss of their lands and resources..."

Despite the promise to "protect the inhabitants", from July 1946 through July 1947, the residents of Bikini Atoll were left alone on Rongerik Atoll and were starving for lack of food. A team of U.S. investigators concluded in late 1947 that the islanders must be moved immediately. Press from around the world harshly criticized the U.S. Navy for ignoring the people. Harold Ickes, a syndicated columnist, wrote "The natives are actually and literally starving to death." The islanders were moved again, this time to Kwajalein Atoll.

==== Move to Kili Island ====
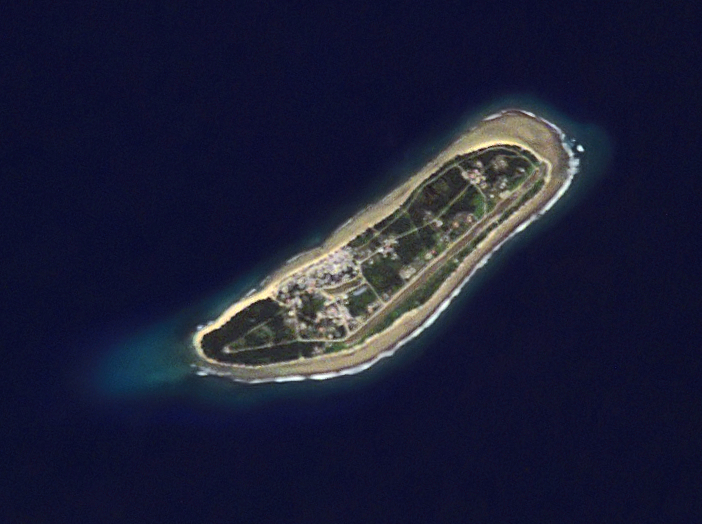
Kili Island, of the Marshall Islands. Although not one of the smaller islands, it is not an atoll with a protected lagoon.

In January 1948, Leonard Mason, an anthropologist from the University of Hawaii, visited Rongerik Atoll and was horrified at what he found. One resident of Rongerik commented,

We'd get a few fish, then the entire community would have to share this meager amount... The fish were not fit to eat there. They were poisonous because of what they ate on the reef. We got sick from them, like when your arms and legs fall asleep and you can't feel anything. We'd get up in the morning to go to our canoes and fall over because we were so ill... Then we started asking these men from America [to] bring us food... We were dying, but they didn't listen to us.

Mason requested that food be brought to the islanders on Rongerik immediately along with a medical officer. The Navy then selected Ujelang Atoll for their temporary home, and some young men from the Bikini Atoll population went ahead to begin constructing living accommodations. But U.S. Trust Authorities changed their mind. They decided to use Enewetak Atoll as a second nuclear weapons test site and relocated the residents to Ujelang Atoll instead and to the homes built for the Bikini Islanders.

In March 1948, 184 malnourished Bikini islanders were relocated again to Kwajalein Atoll. They were given tents on a strip of grass alongside the airport runway to live in. In June 1948, the Bikini residents chose Kili Island as a long-term home. The extremely small, 200 acres (81 ha) (.36 square miles (0.93 km^{2})) island was uninhabited and wasn't ruled by a paramount iroij, or king due to its size. It also lacks a coral reef. In June, the Bikini community chose two dozen men to accompany eight Seabees to Kili to begin construction of a village. In November 1948, the residents, now totaling 184 individuals, moved to Kili Island, at 0.36 square miles (0.93 km^{2}), one of the smallest islands in the Marshall Island chain. They soon learned they could no longer fish the way they had on Bikini Atoll. Kili lacked the calm, protected lagoon. Living on Kili Island effectively destroyed their culture that had been based on fishing and island-hopping canoe voyages to various islets around Bikini Atoll. Kili did not provide enough food for the transplanted residents.

==== Failed resettlement ====
After their relocation to Kili, the Bikini residents continued to suffer from inadequate food supplies. Kili is a small island without a lagoon, and most of the year it is exposed to 10 to 20 ft (3.0 to 6.1 m) waves that make fishing and putting canoes out difficult. Starvation ensued. In 1949, the Trust Territory administration donated a 40-foot (12 m) ship for transporting copra between Kili and Jaluit Atoll, but the ship was wrecked in heavy surf while delivering copra and other fruit. The U.S. Trust Authorities airdropped food onto Kili. The residents had to rely on imported USDA rice and canned goods and had to buy food with their supplemental income.

During 1955 and 1956, ships dispatched by the U.S. Trust Territory continually experienced problems unloading food because of the rough seas around the island, leading to additional food shortages. The people once again suffered from starvation and the shortages increased in 1956. The U.S. suggested that some of the Bikini Islanders move to Jaluit where food was more readily available. A few people moved.

The United States opened a satellite community for the families on public land on Jaluit Atoll, 30 miles (48 km) north. Three families moved there to produce copra for sale and other families rotated living there later on. Their homes on both Kili and Jaluit were struck by typhoons during 1957 and 1958, sinking their supply ship and damaging crops.

==== Return to Bikini Atoll ====
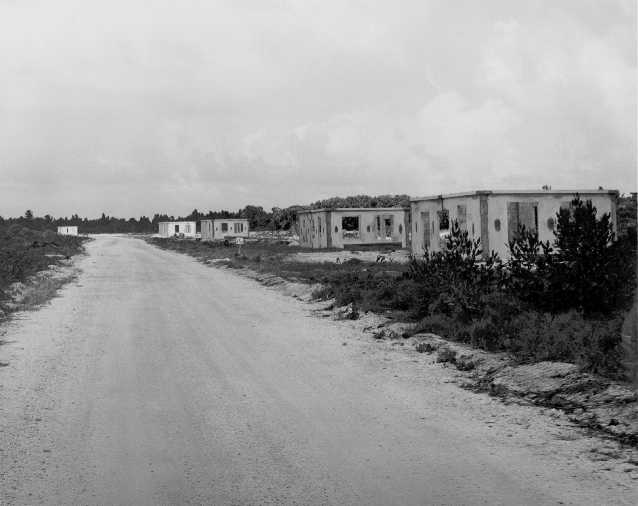
Houses built for the first return to Bikini in the 1960s

In June 1968, based on scientific advice that the radiation levels were sufficiently reduced, President Lyndon B. Johnson promised the 540 Bikini Atoll family members living on Kili and other islands that they would be able to return to their home. The Atomic Energy Commission cleared radioactive debris from the island, and the U.S. Trust Territory was in charge of rebuilding structures and replanting crops on the atoll. But shortly afterward, the Trust Territory ended regular air flights between Kwajalein Atoll and Bikini Atoll, which seriously impeded progress. Coconut trees were finally replanted in 1972, but the AEC learned that the coconut crabs retained high levels of radioactivity and could not be eaten. The Bikini Council voted to delay a return to the island as a result.

Three extended families, eventually totaling about 100 people, moved back to their home island in 1972 despite the risk. But 3 years later, a team of scientists performed additional tests on the island and its inhabitants. They found some wells were too radioactive for use and determined that the pandanus and breadfruit were also dangerous for human consumption. Urine samples from the islanders on Bikini Atoll showed low levels of plutonium-239 and plutonium-240. As a result, the Bikini community filed a federal lawsuit seeking a complete scientific survey of Bikini and the northern Marshall Islands. Inter-departmental squabbling over responsibility for the costs delayed the work for three years. Then in May 1977 scientists found dangerously high levels of strontium-90 in the well water exceeding the U.S. maximum allowed limits. In June, the Department of Energy stated that "All living patterns involving Bikini Island exceed Federal [radiation] guidelines for thirty-year population doses." Later that year scientists discovered an 11-fold increase in the caesium-137 body burdens in all of the people living on the atoll. In May 1978 officials from the U.S. Department of the Interior described the 75% increase in radioactive caesium-137 found as "incredible".

Women were experiencing miscarriages, stillbirths, and genetic abnormalities in their children. Researchers learned that the coral soil behaved differently from mainland soil because it contains very little potassium. Plants and trees readily absorb potassium as part of the normal biological process, but since caesium is part of the same group on the periodic table, it is absorbed by plants in a very similar chemical process. The islanders who unknowingly consumed contaminated coconut milk were found to have abnormally high concentrations of caesium in their bodies. The Trust Territory decided that the islanders had to be evacuated from the atoll a second time.

The islanders received US$75 million in damages in 1986 as part of a new Compact of Free Association with the U.S. and in 1988, another $90 million to be used specifically for radiological cleanup. In 1987, a few Bikini elders traveled to Eneu Island to reestablish old property lines. Construction crews began building a hotel, docks, and roads on Bikini, and installed generators, desalinators, and power lines. A packed coral and sand runway still exists on Eneu Island. The Bikini Atoll Divers was established to provide income. But in 1995, the council learned that the US Environmental Protection Agency standard required reducing radiation levels to 15 millirems per year, substantially less than the US Department of Energy standard of 100 millirems. This discovery significantly increased the potential cost of cleanup and stalled the effort.

=== Relocation to Kili Island ===
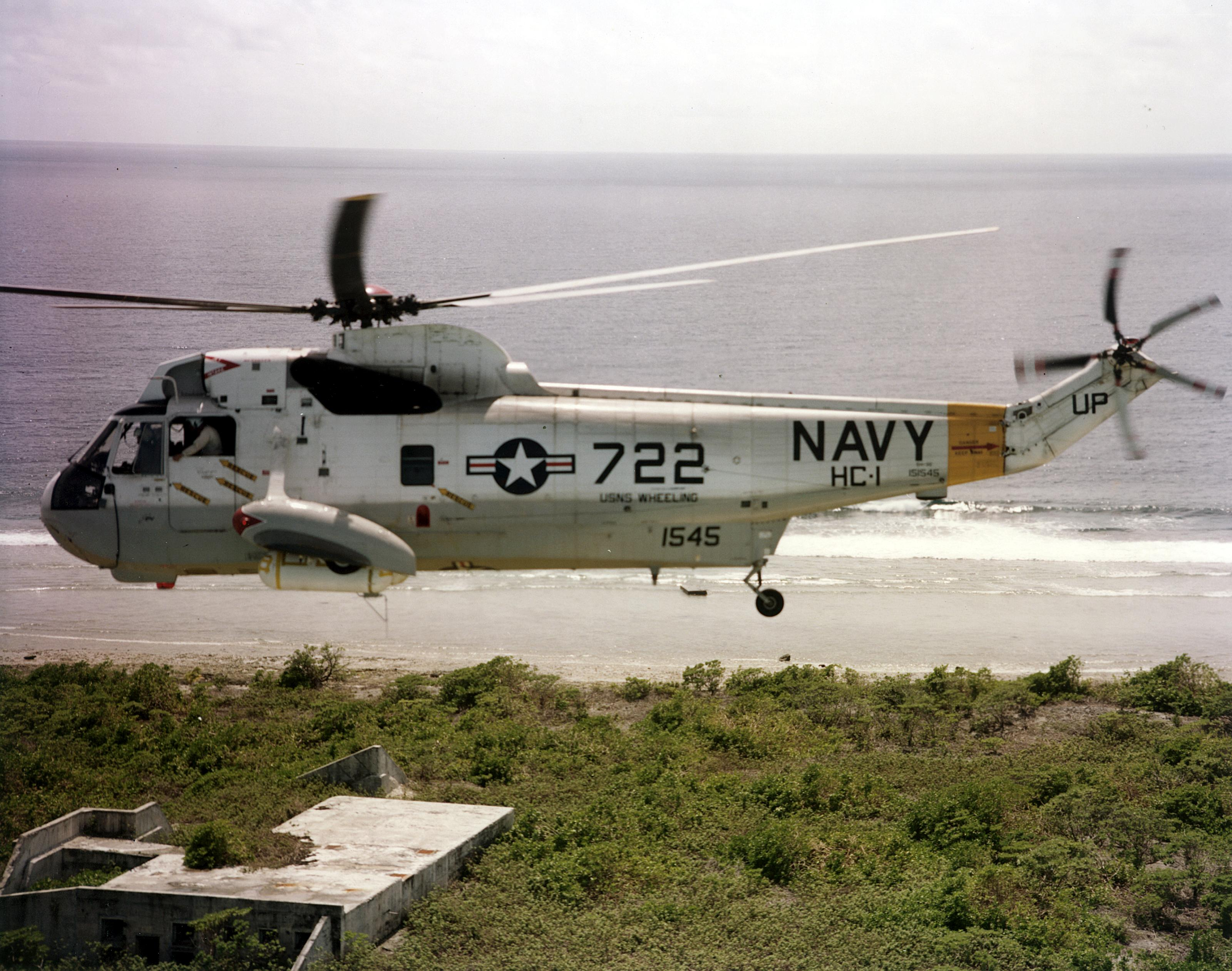
A SH-3G Sea King overflies the Bikini Atoll in 1979 to check radiation levels.

As a result of the military use of the island and the failed resettlement, the islands are littered with abandoned concrete bunkers and tons of heavy equipment, vehicles, supplies, machines, and buildings. In September 1978, Trust Territory officials finally arrived to relocate the residents. The radiological survey of the northern Marshalls, compelled by the 1975 lawsuit, began only after the residents were removed and returned to Kili Island.

As of 2013, the tiny 0.36 square miles (0.93 km^{2}) Kili Island supported about 600 residents who live in cinderblock houses. They must rely on contributions from a settlement trust fund to supplement what they produce locally. Each family receives one to two boxes of frozen chicken, two to four 51-lb (23 kilogram) bags of flour, and two to four bags of rice 2 to 3 times per year. The islanders operate several small stores out of their homes to supply nonperishable food items like salt, Tabasco, candy, and canned items. A generator provides electricity.

Children attend elementary school on Kili through eighth grade. Toward the end of the eighth grade, students must pass a standardized test to gain admission to attend public high school in Jaluit or Majuro.

Beginning in 2011 the resettled residents of Kili Island began to experience periods of ocean flooding during king tide. The highest point of Kili Island is only 9.8 feet (3.0 m) above sea level. Ocean waves have covered portions of the island at least five times from 2011 to 2015, contaminating the wells on the island. The runway servicing the island is unusable during and after rains and ocean flooding because it becomes extremely muddy. In August 2015, the Bikini Council passed a resolution requesting assistance from US government to modify terms of the Resettlement Trust Fund for the People of Bikini to be used to relocate the population once again, this time outside of the Marshall Islands.

The Trust fund had been fairly stable, but after 2017 increased withdrawals drained it down and in the 2020s a crisis erupted to provide services on Kili.

== Trust funds and failed claims ==
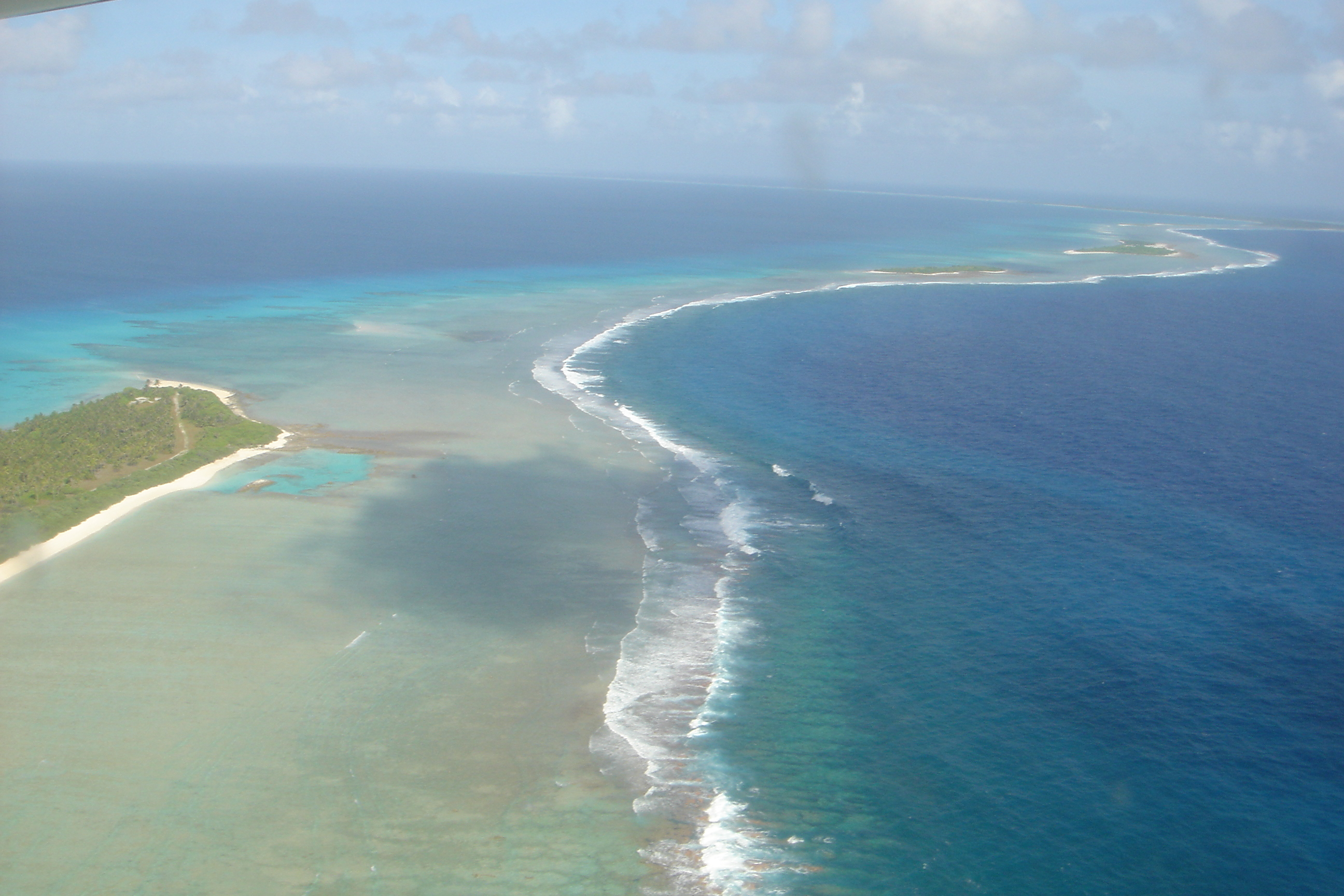
Bikini Atoll in 2005. Although safe for some modest tourism ventures, serious concerns remain about living there full time and living off the land.

In 1975, when the islanders who had returned to Bikini Atoll learned that it wasn't safe, they sued the United States for $900 billion in USD, demanding a radiological study of the northern islands.

In 1975, the United States set up The Hawaiian Trust Fund for the People of Bikini, totaling $3 million. When the islanders were removed from the island in 1978, the U.S. added $3 million to the fund. The U.S. created a second trust fund, The Resettlement Trust Fund for the People of Bikini, containing $20 million in 1982. The U.S. added another $90 million to that fund to pay to clean up, reconstruct homes and facilities, and resettle the islanders on Bikini and Eneu islands.

In 1983, the U.S. and the Marshall islanders signed the Compact of Free Association, which gave the Marshall Islands independence. The Compact became effective in 1986 and was subsequently modified by the Amended Compact that became effective in 2004. It also established the Nuclear Claims Tribunal, which was given the task of adjudicating compensation for victims and families affected by the nuclear testing program. Section 177 of the compact provided for reparations to the Bikini islanders and other northern atolls for damages. It included $75 million to be paid over 15 years.

The payments began in 1987 with $2.4 million paid annually to the entire Bikini population, while the remaining $2.6 million is paid into The Bikini Claims Trust Fund. This trust is intended to exist in perpetuity and to provide the islanders a 5% payment from the trust annually.

The United States provided $150 million in compensation for damage caused by the nuclear testing program and their displacement from their home island.

On 5 March 2001 after years of deliberations, the Nuclear Claims Tribunal ruled against the United States for damages done to the islands and its people. The NCT awarded Bikini $278 million for loss of land use, finding the actions of the U.S. amounted to a "temporary taking" and made its award based on fair rental value for the period of denied use. The NCT made a further award of $251,500,000 for atoll rehabilitation to restore Bikini "to a safe and productive state."

However, the U.S. Congress has failed to fund the settlement. The only recourse is for the Bikini people to petition the U.S. Congress to fund the payment and fulfill this award. The United States Supreme Court turned down the islanders' appeal of the United States Court of Appeals decision that refused to compel the government to fund their claim. By 2001, of the original 167 residents who were relocated, 70 were still alive, and the entire population has grown to 2,800. Most of the islanders and their descendants lived on Kili, in Majuro, and in the United States.

The Hawaiian Trust Fund for the People of Bikini was liquidated as required by law in December 2006. The value of The Resettlement Trust Fund for the People of Bikini as of 31 March 2013 was approximately $82 million and The Bikini Claims Trust Fund was worth approximately $60 million. In 2006, each member of the trust received about $500 a year. In 2012, the trusts produced about US$6 to $8 million annually in investment income, and the trusts paid out less than US$15,000 per family each year in benefits, with little money left available for cleanup.

Representatives for the Bikini people expect this process to take many years and do not know whether the United States will honor the terms of the Compact of Free Association.

In 2017, after lobbying by the leaders of Bikini, the Trump administration stated that there would be no limits on withdrawals from the main fund and no further audits of the main fund. The mayor of the council that is responsible for the Bikini people, Anderson Jibas, used the fund's assets to buy a plane, construction equipment and two cargo ships. In addition, an apartment complex in Majuro, the capital of the Marshall Islands, and 283 acres of land in Hawaii were purchased. By March 2023, only $100,041 was left in the fund that held $59 million in 2017. The council stopped paying its approximately 350 employees and stopped paying $150 monthly subsistence payments to the 6,800 members of the Bikini community.

By 2023, a state of emergency on Kili was declared, and the Marshallese government had to step in try to remedy the situation. Aid helped restore electricity to the island, which had been shut off after the funds were depleted. Many of the purchases that were made including, real estate, aircraft, and boats have not yielded a return for the Bikini.

The depletion of the Bikini islanders' trust fund made news across the Pacific region, including New Zealand, and in major US newspapers such as The New York Times and The Wall Street Journal.

== World Heritage Site ==
Because the site bears direct tangible evidence of the nuclear tests conducted there amid the paradoxical tropical location, UNESCO determined that the atoll symbolizes the dawn of the nuclear age and named it a World Heritage Site on 3 August 2010.

Bikini Atoll has conserved direct tangible evidence ... conveying the power of ... nuclear tests, i.e. the sunken ships sent to the bottom of the lagoon by the tests in 1946 and the gigantic Bravo crater. Equivalent to 7,000 times the force of the Hiroshima bomb, the tests had major consequences on the geology and natural environment of Bikini Atoll and on the health of those who were exposed to radiation. Through its history, the atoll symbolises the dawn of the nuclear age, despite its paradoxical image of peace and of earthly paradise.

== Visitor access ==
Location of Bikini Atoll in the Pacific Ocean

Bikini Atoll is open to visitors aboard vessels that are completely self-sufficient if they obtain prior approval. They must also pay for a diver and two local government council representatives to accompany them. The local representation is required to verify that visitors don't remove artifacts from the wrecks in the lagoon. Extensive research has been conducted to ensure the safety of visitors to the area and to demonstrate the now low levels of radiation in and around Bikini Atoll.

=== Bikini Lagoon diving ===
In June 1996, the Bikini Council authorized diving operations as a means to generate income for Bikini islanders currently and upon their eventual return. The Bikini Council hired dive guide Edward Maddison who had lived on Bikini Island since 1985 and Fabio Amaral, a Brazilian citizen at the time, as head divemaster and resort manager. The tours are limited to fewer than a dozen experienced divers a week, cost more than US$5,000, and include detailed histories of the nuclear tests. The operation brought in more than $500,000 during the season from May to October 2001.

=== On-shore facilities ===
To accommodate the dive program and anglers, the Bikini Council built new air-conditioned rooms with private bathrooms and showers. They included verandas overlooking the lagoon. There was a dining facility that served American-style meals and Marshallese dishes featuring fresh seafood. Only 12 visitors were hosted at one time. Because of the lingering contamination, all fruits and vegetables used for the Bikini Atoll dive and sport fishing operation were imported. In September 2007, the last of Air Marshall Islands' commuter aircraft ceased operations when spare parts could not be located and the aircraft were no longer airworthy. A half dozen divers and a journalist were stranded for a week on Bikini Island. The Bikini islanders suspended land-based dive operations beginning in August 2008. As of 2021, Air Marshall Islands operates one Bombardier DHC-8-100 aircraft and two 19-seat Dornier 228.

=== Liveaboard diving program ===
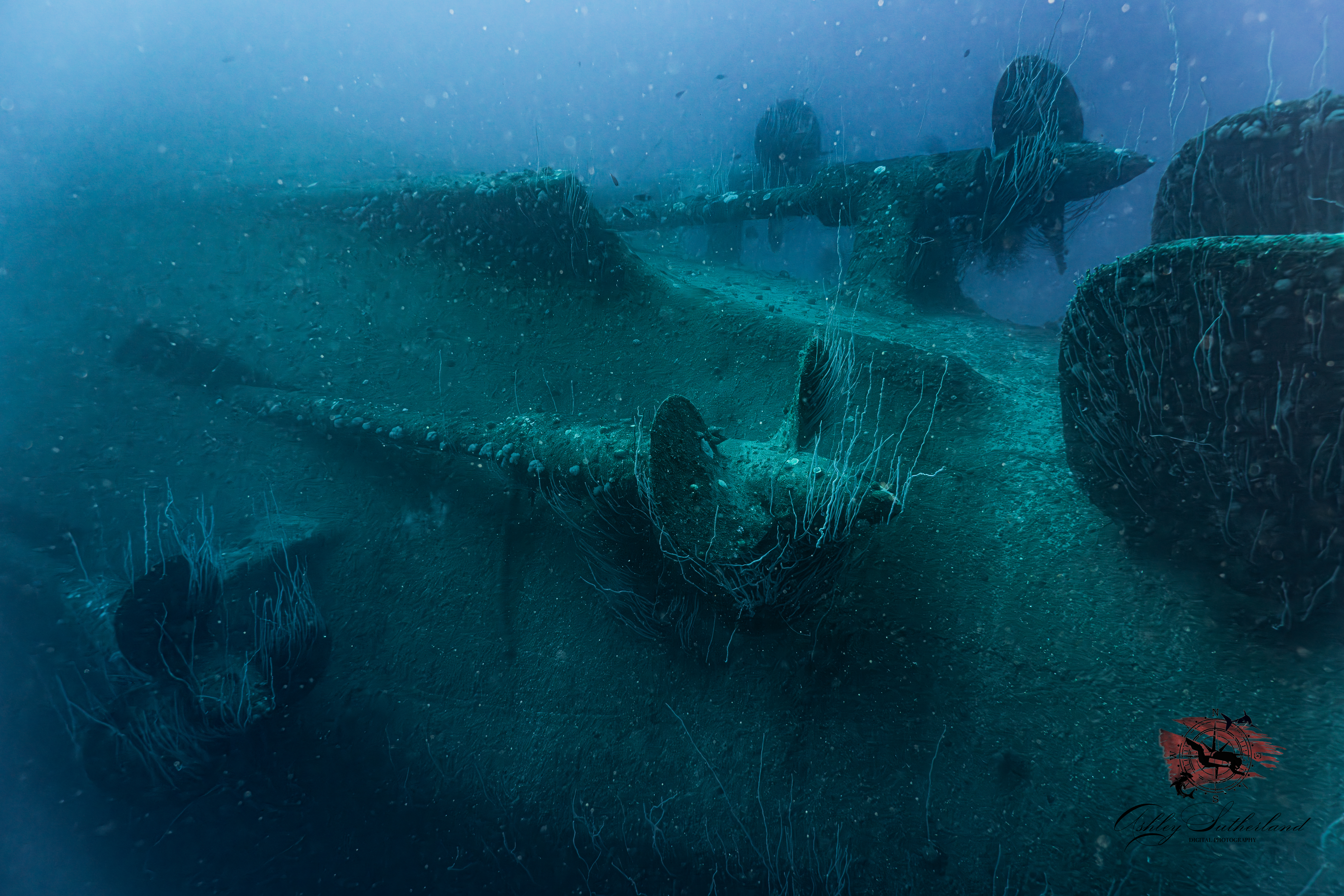
IJN Nagato resting at the bottom of Bikini Atoll

In October 2010, a live-aboard, self-contained vessel successfully conducted dive operations. In 2011, the local government licensed the liveaboard operator as a provider of dive expeditions on the nuclear ghost fleet on Bikini Atoll. The dive season runs from May through October. Visitors are still able to land on the island for brief stays.

In early 2017, Master Liveaboards announced they would add Bikini Atoll to their list of destinations for technical divers using their vessel Truk Master, with trips to the site commencing in May 2018 having been granted a license by the Bikini Council. In May 2021, as a result of ongoing business evaluation and pent up demand created by the COVID-19 pandemic, Master Liveaboards announced they would be adding an additional vessel alongside Truk Master to operate at Bikini Atoll from 2022 onwards.

Because the lagoon has remained undisturbed for so long, it contains a larger amount of sea life than usual, including sharks, which increases divers' interest in the area. Visibility depth is over 100 feet (30 m). The lagoon is immensely popular with divers and is regarded as among the top 10 diving locations in the world.

Dive visitors receive a history lesson along with the dive experience, including movies and complete briefings about each of the ships, their respective histories, and a tour of the island and the atoll. Divers are able to visit the USS Saratoga (CV-3), the second largest of only three aircraft carriers in the world that are accessible to scuba or closed circuit rebreather divers.

=== Sportfishing ===
Bikini Island authorities opened sport fishing to visitors along with diving. Although the atomic blasts obliterated three islands and contaminated much of the atoll, after 50 years the coral reefs have largely recovered. The reefs attract reef fish and their predators: 30 lb (14 kg) dogtooth tuna, 20 lb (9.1 kg) barracuda, and giant trevally as big as 50 pounds (23 kg). Given the long-term absence of humans, the Bikini lagoon offers sportsmen one of the most pristine fishing environments in the world.

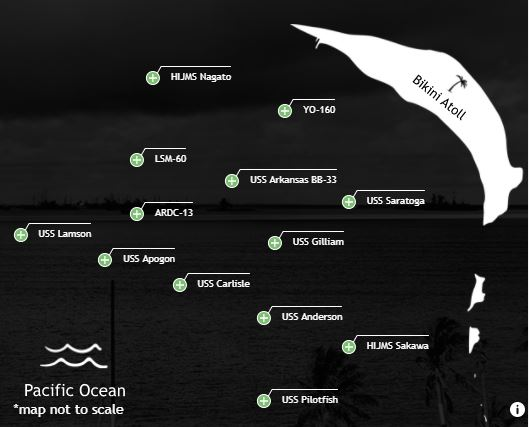
Bikini Atoll Shipwrecks Map

=== Shipwrecks ===
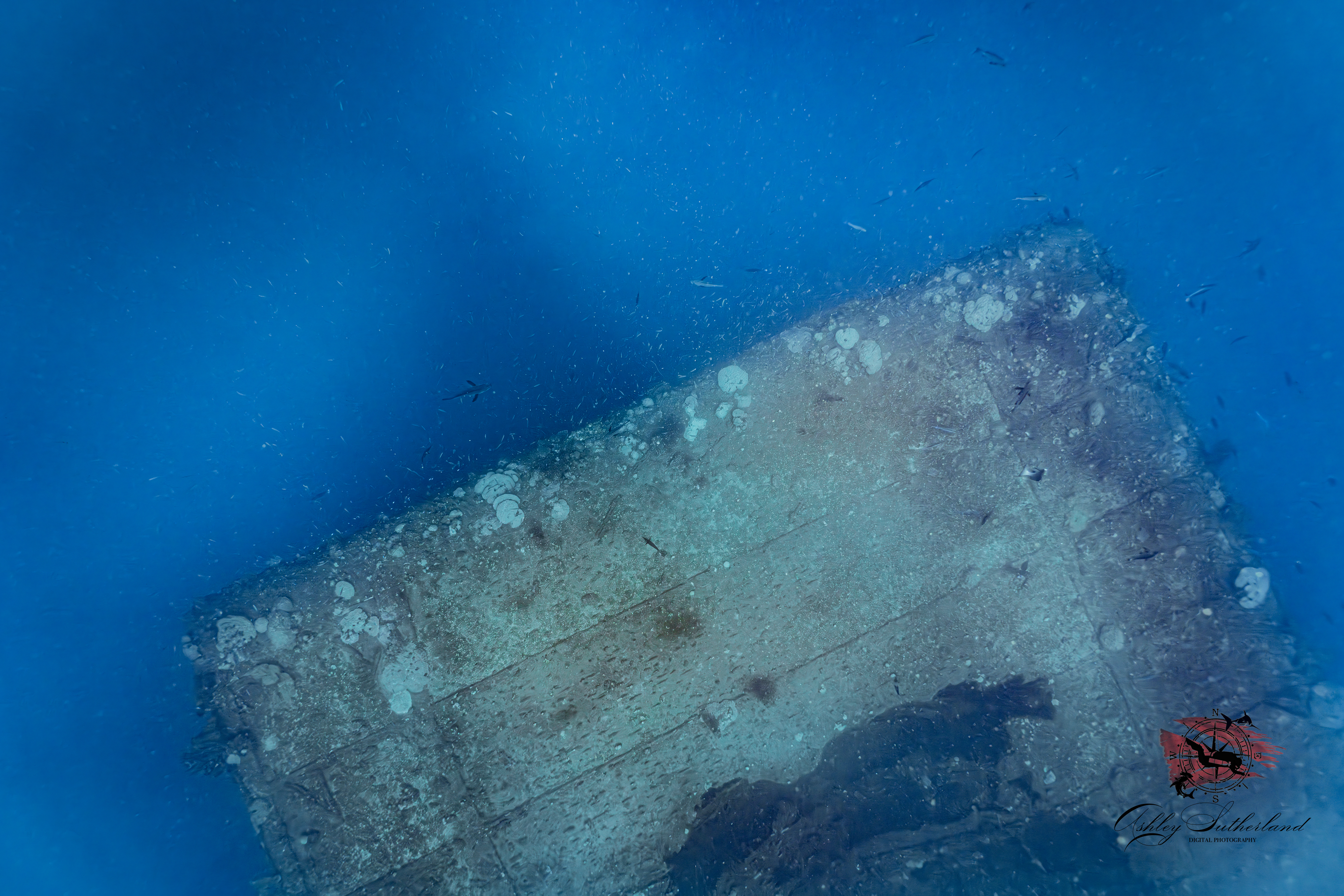
USS Saratoga bow end flight deck

Shipwrecks in the lagoon include the following:

- USS Saratoga (CV-3) – aircraft carrier
- USS Arkansas (BB-33) – battleship
- USS Gilliam (APA-57) – attack transport
- USS Carlisle (APA-69) – attack transport
- USS Lamson (DD-367) – destroyer
- USS Anderson (DD-411) – destroyer
- USS Apogon (SS-308) – submarine
- USS Pilotfish (SS-386) – submarine
- Japanese battleship Nagato – battleship
- Japanese cruiser Sakawa – light cruiser

== 21st century habitable condition ==
Due to the nuclear weapon testing, the island was subjected to environmental testing in 1998 by the International Atomic Energy Agency. To validate previous surveys data collected, the agency tested air absorption rates and soil and food radionuclide concentrations.

In 1998, an IAEA advisory group, formed in response to a request by the Government of the Marshall Islands for an independent international review of the radiological conditions on Bikini Atoll, recommended that Bikini Island should not be permanently resettled considering its radiological conditions.

The potential to make the island habitable has substantially improved since then. A 2012 assessment from Lawrence Livermore National Laboratory found that cesium-137 levels were dropping considerably faster than expected. Terry Hamilton, scientific director of Lawrence Livermore National Laboratory's Marshall Islands Dose Assessment and Radioecology Program, reported that "Conditions have really changed on Bikini. They are improving at an accelerated rate. By using the combined option of removing soil and adding potassium, we can get very close to the 15 millirem standard. That has been true for roughly the past 10 years. So now is the time when the Bikinians, if they desired, could go back."

As of 2013, about 4,880 descendants of the original Bikini people live on Kili and other Marshall Islands and some have immigrated to the United States. Bikini Island is currently visited by a few scientists and inhabited by 4–6 caretakers.

The islanders want the topsoil removed, but lack the necessary funding. The opportunity for some Bikini islanders to potentially relocate back to their home island creates a dilemma. While the island may be habitable in the near term, virtually none of the islanders alive have ever lived there. As of 2013, unemployment in the Marshall Islands was at about 40 percent. The population is growing at a four-percent growth rate, so increasing numbers are taking advantage of terms in the Marshall Islands' Compact of Free Association that allow them to live in and work in the United States.

After the islanders were relocated in 1946, while the Bikini islanders were experiencing starvation on Rongerik Atoll, Lore Kessibuki wrote an anthem for the island:

No longer can I stay, it's true
No longer can I live in peace and harmony
No longer can I rest on my sleeping mat and pillow
Because of my island and the life I once knew there
The thought is overwhelming
Rendering me helpless and in great despair.

== In popular culture ==
=== Cinema ===
- The documentary Bikini – mon amour by Oliver Herbrich shows the effects of long-term low-level radiation on the population.
- The 1962 Italian mondo documentary film Mondo Cane shows the effects of long-term low-level radiation on the wildlife.
- The nuclear tests at Bikini, along with the Hiroshima and Nagasaki bombings, inspired the 1954 Japanese movie Godzilla.

=== Television shows ===
The Nickelodeon animated series SpongeBob SquarePants primarily takes place in Bikini Bottom, which was named after Bikini Atoll and is supposedly situated underneath it.

During a 2015 interview with Tom Kenny, the voice actor for SpongeBob, he was asked about the popular theory that the residents of Bikini Bottom evolved to have language and intellectualness as a direct result of nuclear testing. Kenny replied:

Well, Bikini Bottom is kind of named after Bikini Atoll, you know, where they did nuclear testing decades ago. So... nah, that one. I don't think SpongeBob and his friends are mutations.

In 2024, Rodger Bumpass (voice actor for Squidward) said he also believed the theory was false, but Mr. Lawrence (voice actor for Plankton) said the theory was "absolutely true":

That was part of the fun of it, was, how far are we taking that concept? I mean, right at the beginning, when we were sort of developing it in the first season, it was like, 'are we gonna play off of this apocalyptic thing?' Like, 'the whole world is dead except for Bikini Bottom. ... the world upstairs is gone, and this is what's left.'

=== Swimsuit design ===
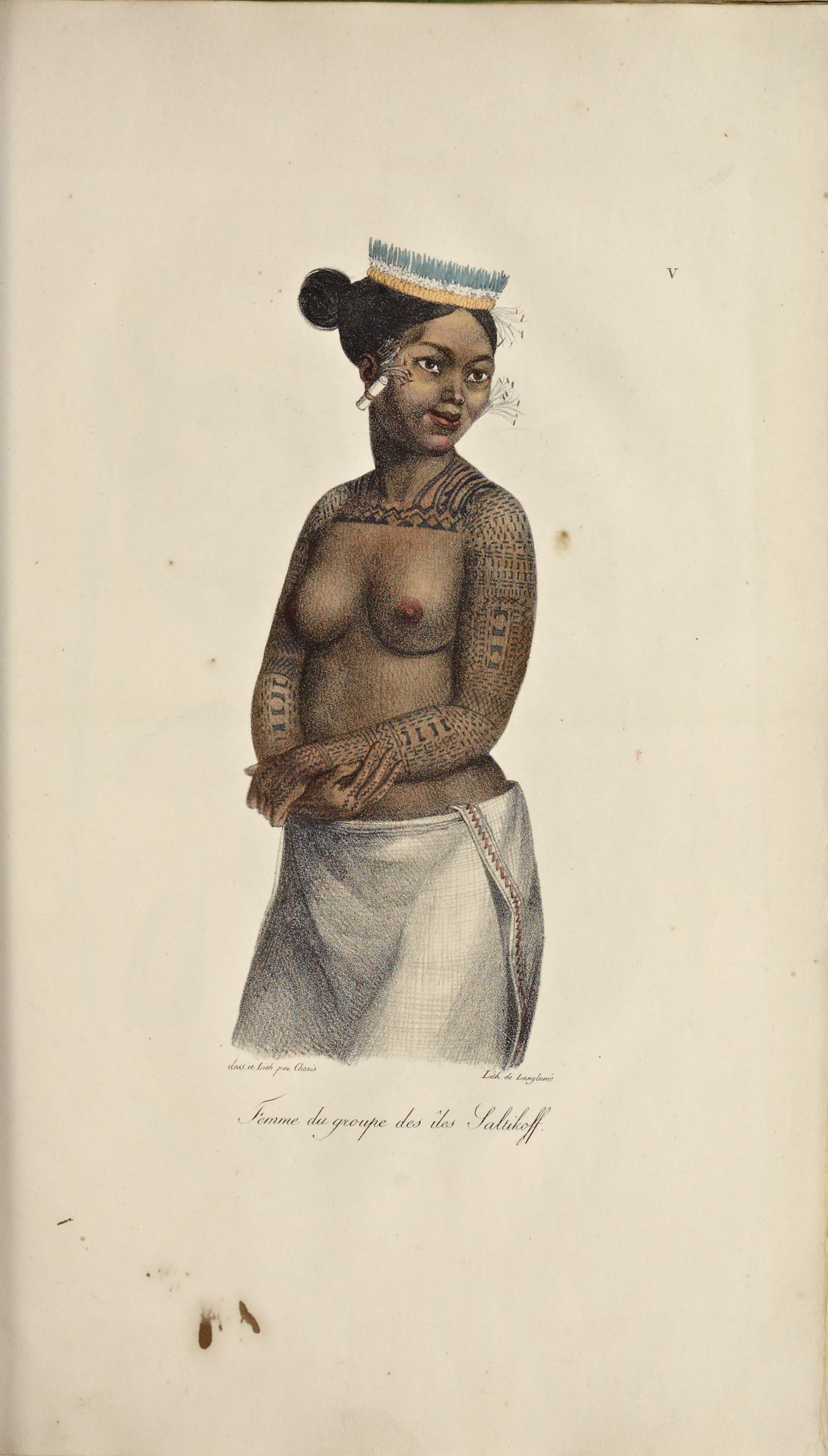
Marshall Islands woman wears a traditional nieded or clothing mat. The Marshallese women were socially comfortable exhibiting bare breasts, in contrast to many Western countries where the bikini's covering of nipples was a key to modesty.

On 5 July 1946, four days after the first nuclear device (nicknamed Able) was detonated over Bikini Atoll during Operation Crossroads, Louis Réard introduced a new swimsuit design named the bikini after the atoll. Réard was a French mechanical engineer by training and manager of his mother's lingerie shop in Paris. He introduced the new garment to the media and public on 5 July 1946 at Piscine Molitor, a public pool in Paris.

He hired Micheline Bernardini, an 18-year-old nude dancer from the Casino de Paris, to demonstrate his design. It featured string briefs of 30 square inches (200 cm^{2}) of cloth with newspaper-type print and was an immediate sensation. Bernardini received 50,000 fan letters, many of them from men. Réard hoped that his swimsuit's revealing style would create an "explosive commercial and cultural reaction" similar in intensity to the social reaction to 1946 nuclear explosion on Bikini Atoll. Fashion writer Diana Vreeland described the bikini as the "atom bomb of fashion".

Because the bikini exposes a woman's thighs, it violates the Marshall Islanders' modern customs of modesty, whereas cultural taboos regarding women's breasts are less strict on the islands. Marshall Island women swim in their muumuus, which are made of a fine polyester that dries quickly. Wearing a bikini in the Marshall Islands is mainly limited to restricted-access beaches and pools like those at private resorts or on United States government facilities on Kwajalein Atoll within the Ronald Reagan Ballistic Missile Defense Test Site.

== Gallery ==
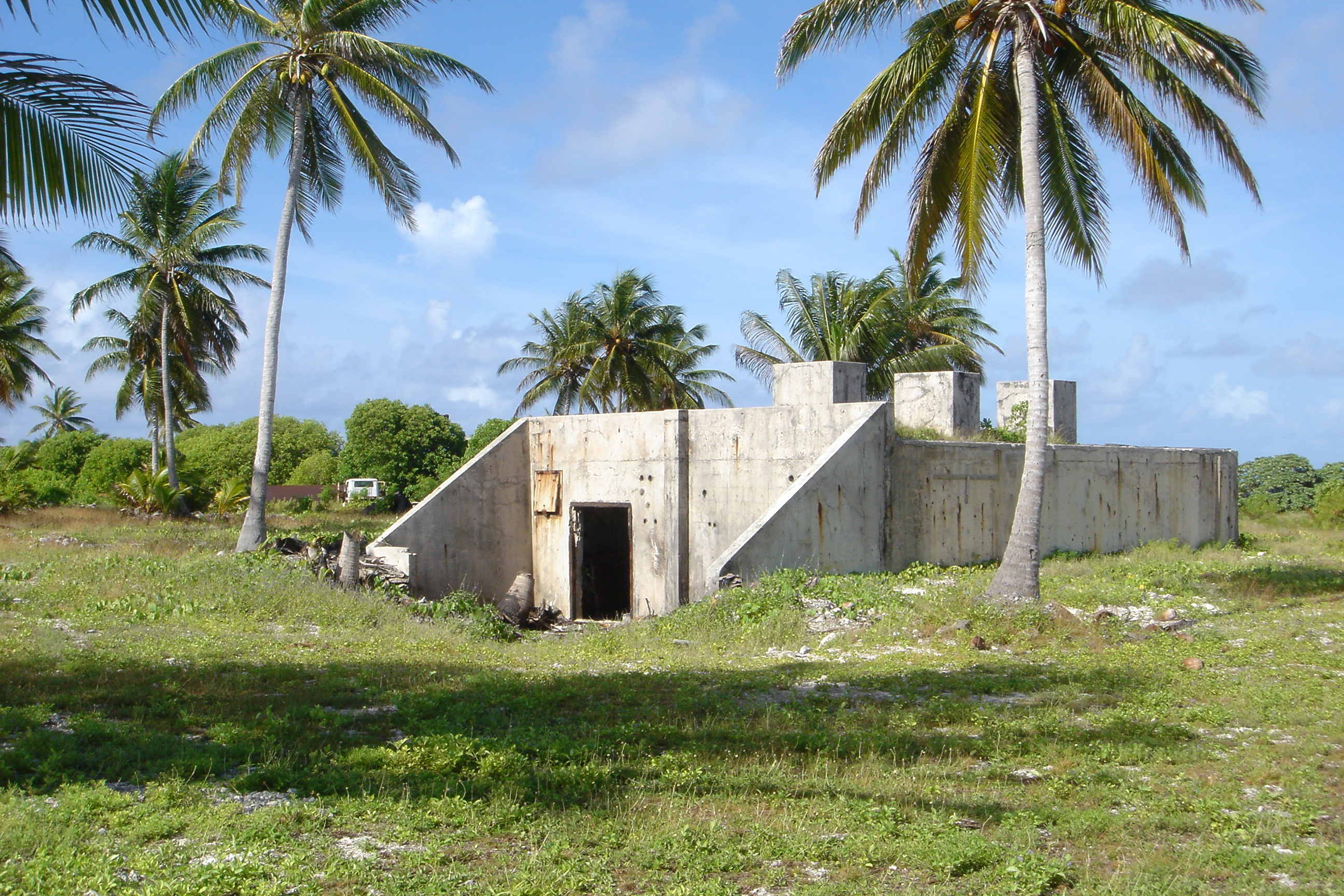
American bunker located in the island

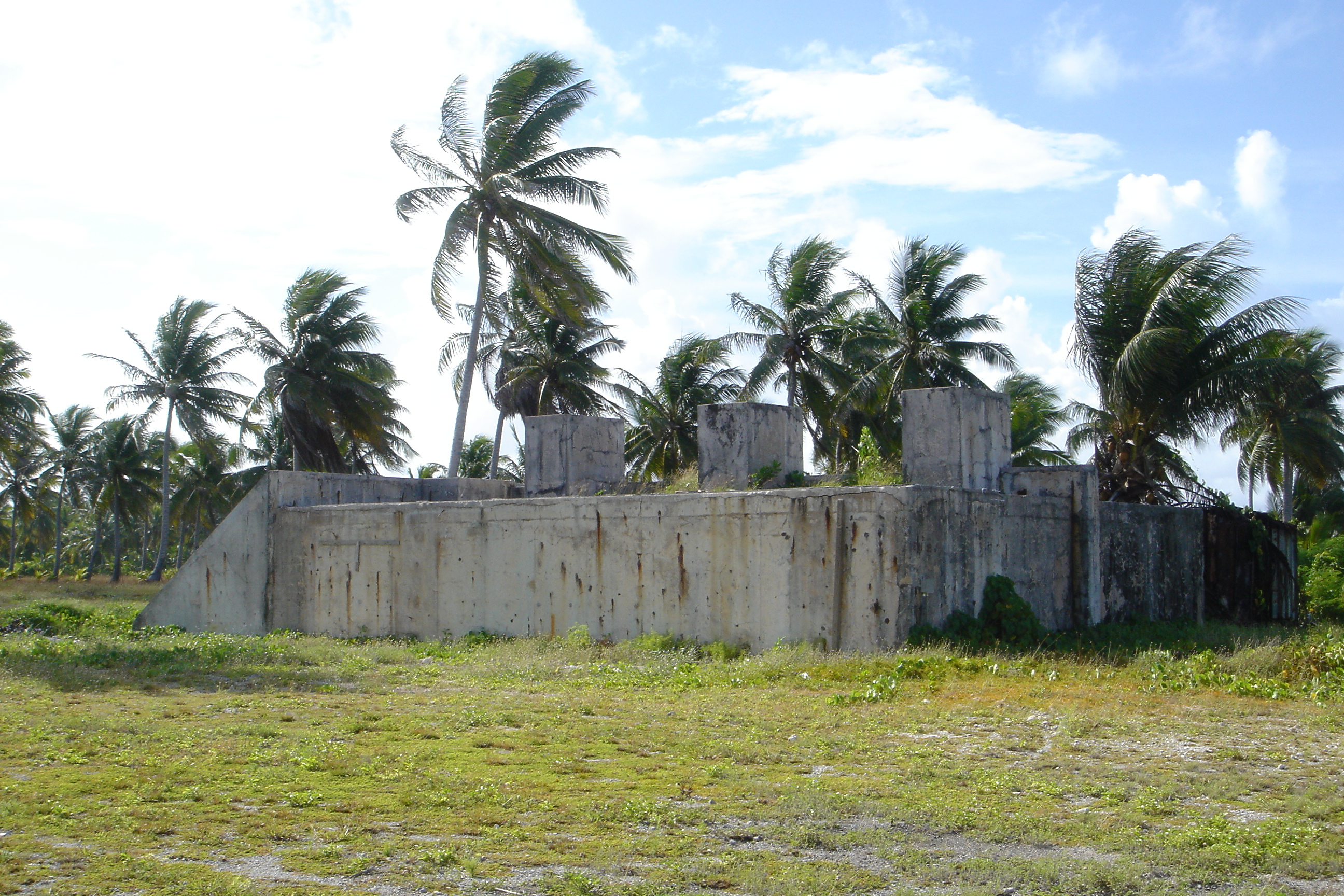
Rear of bunker

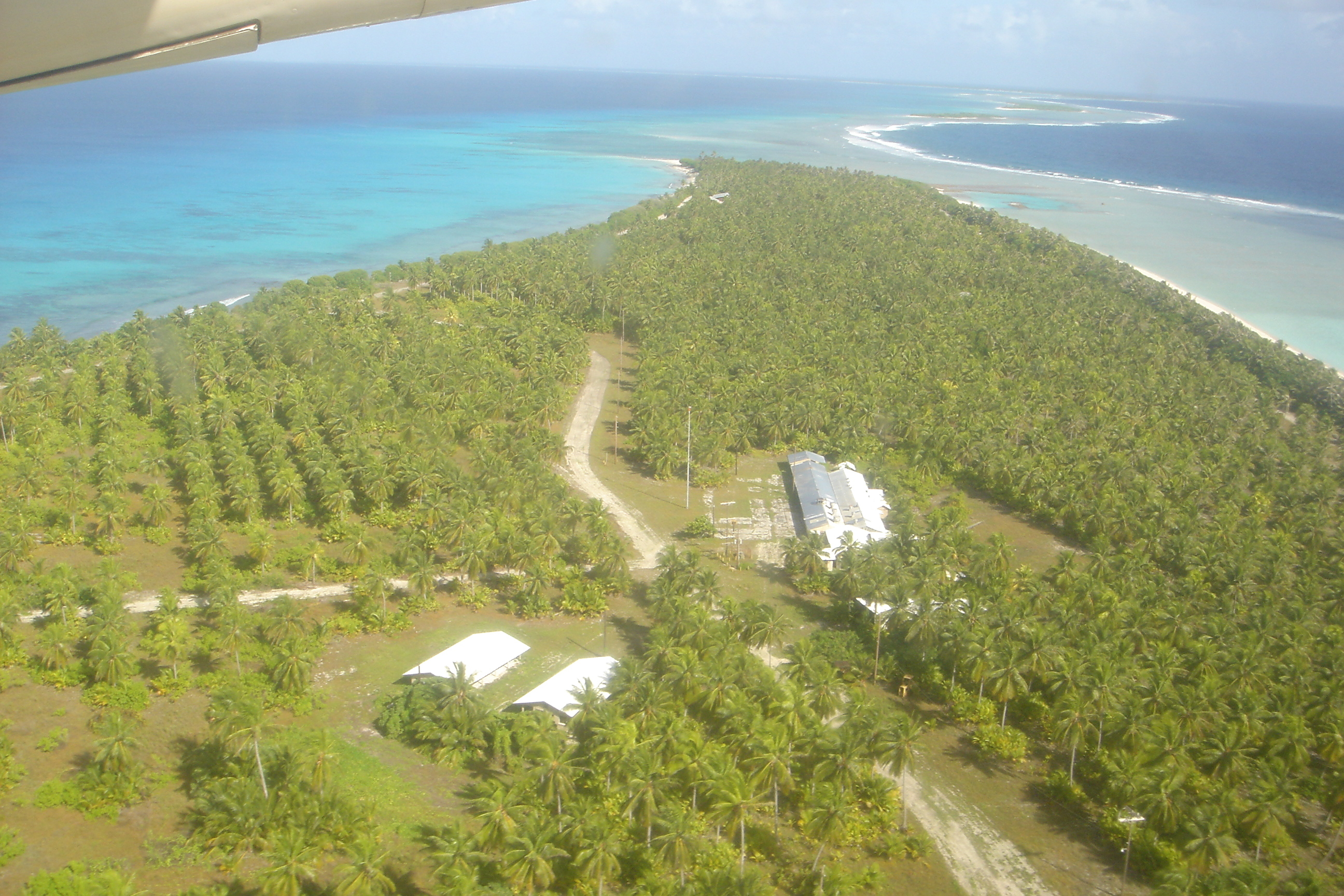
The island seen from above

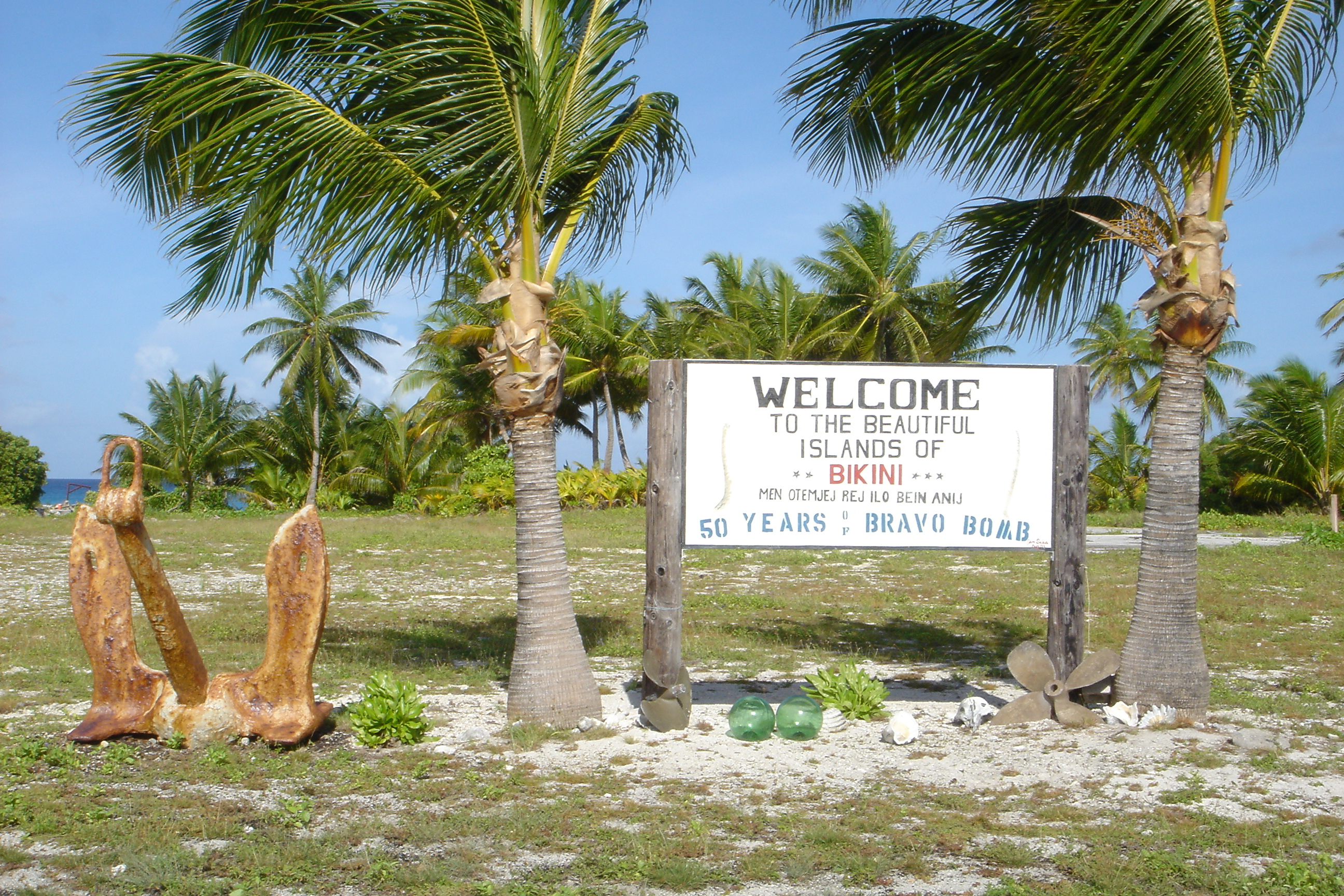
Entrance sign to the island

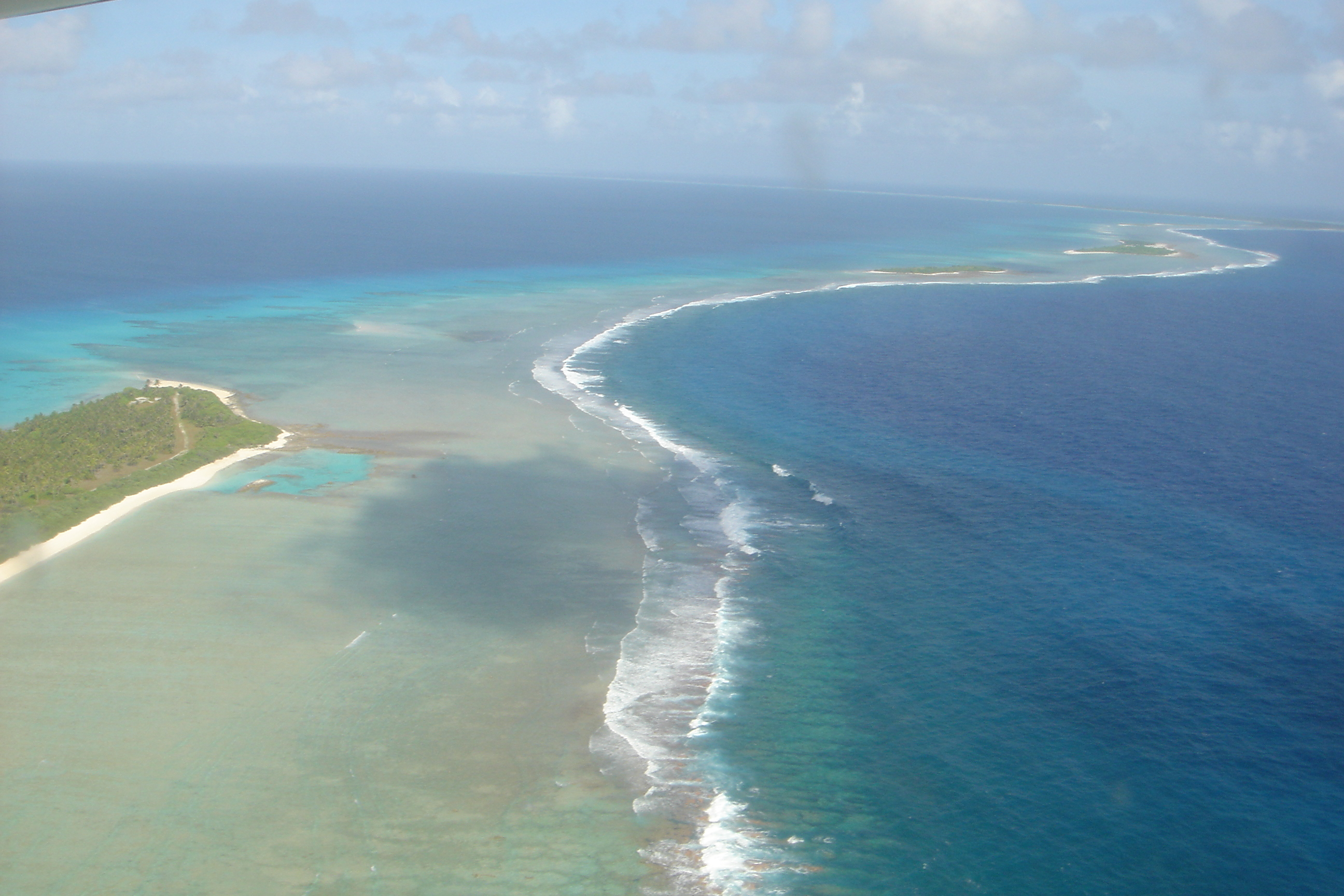
View of the coast from above

== See also ==
- Operation Castle
- Operation Ivy
- Radio Bikini
- Wōdejebato
- SpongeBob SquarePants (The cartoon is theorised to take place here)
