= Wōdejebato =

Guyot in the Marshall Islands northwest of the smaller Pikinni Atoll

Wōdejebato, Sylvania
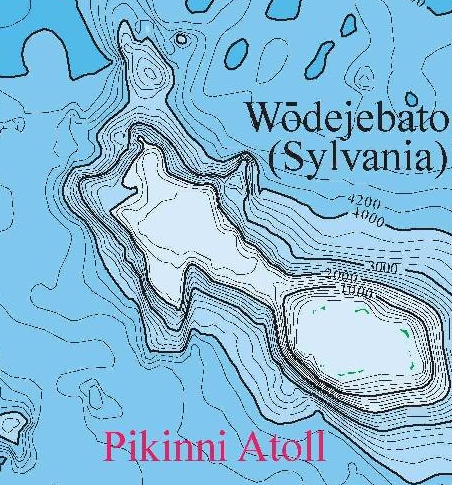

- Location within Marshall Islands
- Summit depth: 1,335 metres (4,380 ft)
- Height: 4,420 metres (14,500 ft)
- Summit area: 1,200 square kilometres (462 mi^{2})

Location
- Coordinates: 12°N 164.9°E
- Country: Marshall Islands

Geology
- Type: Shield volcano
- Age of rock: Cenomanian and Campanian

History
- Discovery date: 1944

Wōdejebato (formerly known as Sylvania) is a Cretaceous (Note: Between c. 145 and 66 million years ago.) guyot or tablemount in the northern Marshall Islands, Pacific Ocean. Wōdejebato is probably a shield volcano and is connected through a submarine ridge to the smaller Pikinni Atoll 74 kilometres (46 mi) southeast of the guyot; unlike Wōdejebato, Pikinni rises above sea level. The seamount rises for 4,420 metres (14,500 ft) to 1,335 metres (4,380 ft) depth and is formed by basaltic rocks. The name Wōdejebato refers to a sea god of Pikinni.

It was probably formed by a hotspot in present-day French Polynesia before plate tectonics moved it to its present location. The Macdonald, Rarotonga, Rurutu and Society hotspots may have been involved in its formation. The first volcanic phase took place in the Cenomanian and was followed by the formation of a carbonate platform that quickly disappeared below the sea. A second volcanic episode between 85 and 78.4 million years ago (in the Campanian) led to the formation of an island. This island was eventually eroded and rudist reefs generated an atoll or atoll-like structure, covering the former island with carbonates and thus a second carbonate platform.

The second carbonate platform drowned about 68 million years ago (in the Maastrichtian), perhaps because at that time it was moving through the equatorial area which may have been too hot or too nutrient-rich to support the growth of a coral reef. Thermal subsidence lowered the drowned seamount to its present depth. After a hiatus, sedimentation commenced on the seamount and led to the deposition of manganese crusts and pelagic sediments, some of which were later modified by phosphate.

== Name and research history ==
Wōdejebato is also written as Wodejebato. The name of the seamount comes from Wōdejebato, the name of the most feared and respected sea god of Pikinni Atoll. Wōdejebato was formerly called Sylvania, after the USS Sylvania, a ship which was involved in its first mapping in 1946. The seamount was discovered in 1944, and was first investigated, using mainly seismic data, during Operation Crossroads (a nuclear bomb test). Later, several times rocks were dredged from the seamount and drill cores were taken; cores 873–877 of the Ocean Drilling Program (Note: The Ocean Drilling Program was a research program that aimed at elucidating the geological history of the sea by obtaining drill cores from the oceans.) are from Wōdejebato.

== Geography and geology ==
=== Local setting ===
Wōdejebato lies within the Ralik Chain of islands and seamounts in the northern Marshall Islands, which consist of about three northwest-trending groups of islands of volcanic origin. Pikinni Atoll (formerly named Bikini) is located about 74 kilometres (46 mi) southeast of the seamount.

Bathymetric map of the Marshall Islands

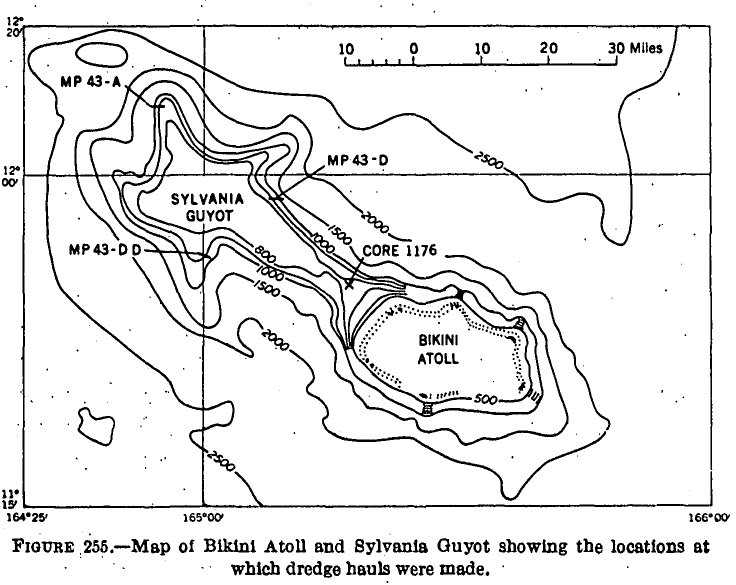
Bathymetry of Wōdejebato and Pikinni

The seamount lies at a depth of 1,335 metres (4,380 ft) and is about 43 kilometres (27 mi) long with a 1,200 square kilometres (462 mi^{2}) flat top that narrows southeastward from over 25 kilometres (16 mi) to less than 12 kilometres (7.5 mi). The surface of the flat top slopes inward and is covered by small depressions and knobs with an average relief of about 1 metre (3 ft 3 in) as well as ripple marks. The flat top is surrounded by a ridge, which has a width of 100–800 metres (330–2,620 ft) and an average height of 36 metres (118 ft). On its northern and northeastern side, this ridge is in turn surrounded by another 200–700 metres (660–2,300 ft) wide slightly raised ridge. The flat top has been interpreted as a lagoon surrounded by reefs which form the inner ridge; the outer ridge appears to be a pile of skeletal sand rather than a reef and may be a spit formed by reworked material. Small mounds, probably of biological origin, are found at the margins of the seamount.

The seamount is 4,420 metres (14,500 ft) high above the sea floor and has an irregular shape, with spurs projecting from its circumference. These spurs have widths of 11–13 kilometres (6.8–8.1 mi) and surface features that are distinct from those on the main flat top. The spurs appear to be rift zones, similar to these formed on Hawaii by dyke injection although some of the ridges at Wōdejebato may have a different origin. Wōdejebato appears to have four such ridges, which is more than is observed at Hawaii. One explanation is that the northwestern ridge is another seamount; another that Wōdejebato consists of more than one volcano although the relatively small size of the seamount would argue against this view. Wōdejebato's slopes descend rather steeply until, at 2,500 metres (8,200 ft) depth, where they become more gentle, they are decorated with forms resembling cones and channels. Part of its southern flank, where there is a downdropped terrace, seems to have collapsed in the past. Another satellite volcanic cone lies north of Wōdejebato at a depth of 3,000 metres (9,800 ft). Wōdejebato contains a volcanic structure within a superficial sediment cap, and a free-air gravity anomaly has been observed on the seamount.

Wōdejebato is connected to Pikinni by a 9.7 kilometres (6 mi) wide, 20 kilometres (12 mi) long and 1.5 kilometres (0.93 mi) high submarine ridge and both volcanoes share a pedestal; Wōdejebato is the bigger of the two and its flat top has a larger surface than Pikinni's. Magnetic anomalies are also found on both volcanoes, with Wōdejebato featuring the more extensive one. Debris from these two volcanoes has formed an apron on their southwestern foot that is up to 800 metres (2,600 ft) thick. The seafloor beneath Wōdejebato was formed during the Jurassic Quiet Zone over 156.9 million years ago. Farther north from Wōdejebato lies Lōjabōn-Bar seamount, and Look Guyot is due east. Wōdejebato appears to be one source of turbidites in the Nauru Basin.

=== Regional setting ===
Illustration of how hotspot volcanoes work

The Pacific Ocean seafloor, especially the Mesozoic seafloor, contains most of the world's guyots (also known as tablemounts). These are submarine mountains which are characterized by steep slopes, a flat top and usually the presence of corals and carbonate platforms. While there are some differences to present-day reef systems, many of these seamounts were formerly atolls. Some atolls still exist, for example at Pikinni. All these structures originally formed as volcanoes in the Mesozoic ocean. Fringing reefs may have developed on the volcanoes, which then became barrier reefs as the volcano subsided and turned into an atoll. The crust underneath these seamounts tends to subside as it cools, and thus the islands and seamounts sink. Continued subsidence balanced by upward growth of the reefs led to the formation of thick carbonate platforms. Sometimes volcanic activity continued even after the formation of the atoll or atoll-like structure, and during episodes where the carbonate platforms rose above sea level, erosional features such as channels and blue holes developed.

The formation of many such seamounts has been explained with the hotspot theory, which describes the formation of chains of volcanoes which get progressively older along the length of the chain, with an active volcano only at one end of the system. Seamounts and islands in the Marshall Islands do not appear to have originated from such simple age-progressive hotspot volcanism as the age progressions in the individual island and seamount chains are often inconsistent with a hotspot origin. One explanation for this contradiction may be that more than one hotspot passed through the Marshall Islands, and it is also possible that hotspot volcanism was affected by extensional deformation of the lithosphere. In the case of Wōdejebato, candidate present-day hotspots are the Macdonald hotspot which passed close to the seamount during the Aptian and Albian ages, between 115 and 94 million years ago in the early Cretaceous, and the Society hotspot and Rarotonga hotspot which approached the seamount in the late Cretaceous 85-80 million years ago, both time periods where volcanism occurred on Wōdejebato. A third hotspot which interacted with Wōdejebato is the Rurutu hotspot. The last two are the hotspots most likely to be long-lived, while many others, such as the Marquesas hotspot, were probably active discontinuously or only for brief time intervals.

Based on plate motion reconstructions, the region of the Marshall Islands was located in the region of present-day French Polynesia during the time of active volcanism. Both regions have numerous island chains, anomalously shallow ocean floors and the presence of volcanoes. About eight hotspots have generated a large number of islands and seamounts in that region, with disparate geochemistries.

=== Composition ===
The rocks at Wōdejebato include basalt, breccia, carbonates, clay, claystone, limestone, manganese, manganese phosphate, peloid, shale and tuff; with an unusually large amount of pyroclastic rocks present. Organic material such as kerogen, peat and woody material has also been found. Ferromanganese crusts have been found on the seamount. The crusts are composed of asbolane, birnessite and buserite and contain iron and cobalt. Wōdejebato has been evaluated as a possible mining site for its mineral deposits.

The limestones appear in several forms such as floatstone, grainstone, micrite, packstone, peloid and wackestone. Some grainstones and rudstones appear to be derived from algal and animal fossils. Many carbonate rocks have been altered, for example by cementation and leaching of their components and the dissolution of aragonite; in some samples up to half of all the rock has been altered. These processes are collectively known as diagenesis.

Basalts at Wōdejebato mostly form an alkali basalt suite but also include ankaramite and hawaiite. The rocks contain clinopyroxene, olivine, plagioclase and pyroxene phenocrysts. Alteration has led to the formation of calcite, chabazite, chlorite, hydromica, pyrite, serpentine and smectite, and gaps and cavities in the rock have been filled by sediments. The element geochemistry of lavas from Wōdejebato resembles that of South Central Pacific islands such as Marotiri and Rarotonga and is consistent with magma sources of intraplate volcanism. Isotope ratios show affinities to those of volcanic rocks from the Macdonald, Rurutu, Rarotonga and Society hotspots; differences between isotope ratios of various stages of volcanism may reflect the passage of Wōdejebato over more than one "plumelet".

== Geologic history ==
Cretaceous graphical timeline
← / K-Pg mass extinction
Subdivision of the Cretaceous according to the ICS, as of 2024. Vertical axis scale: Millions of years ago

Wōdejebato formed either before or during the Santonian age (86.3 ± 0.5 – 83.6 ± 0.2 million years ago), with the Albian age (about 113 to 100.5 million years ago) being a likely candidate. Wōdejebato originated in the Southern Hemisphere and was moved by plate tectonics into the Northern Hemisphere, and paleomagnetism indicates that the seamount was located at 10 degrees southern latitude when the most recent lavas erupted. It subsequently underwent several episodes of uplift and subsidence and eventually drowned, forming the present-day seamount. Ruwitūntūn is another seamount in the Marshall Islands with a similar history.

=== Volcanism and first biotic phenomena ===
Volcanism at Wōdejebato appears to have occurred during two phases over a timespan of about 20 million years. The first phase took place during the Cenomanian (100.5–93.9 million years ago); it was characterized by explosive eruptions and may be the source of 93.9–96.3 million year old volcanic debris found in the surroundings of Wōdejebato. The second phase occurred during the Campanian between 78.4 and 85 million years ago during chron 33R; it appears to be part of a volcanic event that affected a number of other islands and seamounts in the Marshall Islands and at Wōdejebato lasted for at least four million years. The second stage appears to have been a secondary volcanic episode. Volcanic rocks sampled at Wōdejebato all belong to the second stage, probably due to sampling bias as the samples all come from the summit region. Tectonic evidence indicates that Pikinni formed at the same time as Wōdejebato, while the northern parasitic cone may be less than 80 million years old and reefs have been covered by volcanic rocks of Campanian (80–70 million years ago) age. An earlier proposal by Schlanger et al. 1987 envisaged Eocene (56 – 33.9 million years ago) eruptions at Wōdejebato but today the older ages are considered to be correct.

The volcanic activity produced breccia and lava flows, probably first generating a shield volcano. Volcanic activity occurred both in shallow water and submarine forming hyaloclastite and highly vesicular rocks during phreatomagmatic (Note: Phreatomagmatic eruptions are volcanic eruptions during which the interaction of magma or lava with water plays an important role.) eruptions, and above sea level as indicated by the presence of basaltic pebbles. Some early volcanic deposits were buried by later activity. There are conflicting reports about whether hydrothermal (Note: Hydrothermal activity is the discharge of hot water or steam, such as fumaroles and hot springs.) activity took place. Vegetation including ferns and fungi grew on the exposed island during the Campanian, leaving abundant wood remnants. Weathering of basaltic rocks produced clay sediments and soils 5–22.5 metres (16–74 ft) thick have been obtained in drill cores.

=== Platform carbonates and reefs ===
After volcanic activity ceased, environmental processes transformed Wōdejebato into a flat-topped platform, equivalent to a present-day atoll, as the crust beneath Wōdejebato seamount subsided. Erosion and subsidence lowered the volcanic pile until seawater flooded it and marine sedimentation commenced. This platform phase lasted only about 10 million years and took place in at least two stages, in line with the generally short duration of such platform phases; they do not generally last longer than 20 million years. The growth of the platform was not continuous and was probably interrupted by one drowning event between the Albian and Campanian ages, similar to other seamounts in the Pacific Ocean which also drowned during this time.

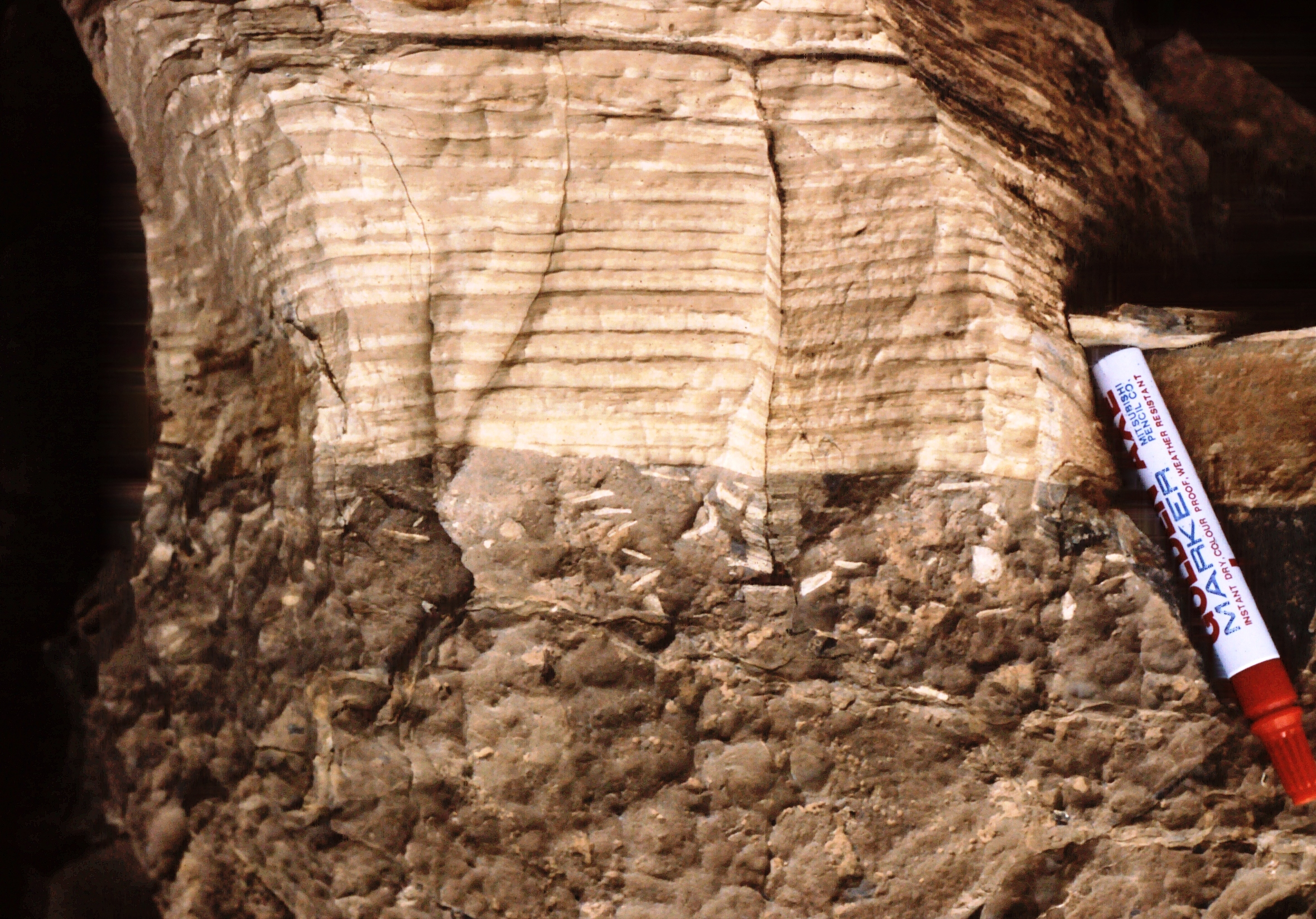
Coral platforms look like this one from Morocco

Limestones and carbonates forming a platform accumulated on Wōdejebato, with drill cores showing total thicknesses of 100 metres (330 ft)–200 metres (660 ft). Compositionally, it consists mainly of sandy carbonates that are often leached and cemented by calcitic material. These deposits eventually covered the entire upper area of the volcanic high and formed the inner ridge. Variations in sea level occasionally led to parts of the platform either emerging above sea level or submerging, leading to erosion that generated the outer ridge and to the development of characteristic sequences within the deposits.

Such carbonate platforms look like present-day atolls but unlike the biogenic frameworks of modern atolls they were formed by biogenic sediments; at Wōdejebato sandy shoals appear to have been a principal component. These carbonate deposits would then have been surrounded by a barrier reef and the redeposition, followed by stabilization, of eroded material had a role in the development of the surrounding rim. Reef mounds grew to several tens of metres in height. Foraminiferal fossil data imply that lagoonal environments existed on Wōdejebato. The central part of the guyot surface and its margins feature different platform structures, and the platform has been subdivided into several different assemblages on the basis of foraminifera stages.

Environmental conditions on the platform were characterized by tropical influences. Wōdejebato was probably located in equatorial waters with temperatures likely exceeding 25 °C (77 °F), with temperature ranges of 27–32 °C (81–90 °F) during the Maastrichtian. The platform was sometimes affected by storms that reworked the rock material. Soil properties imply that precipitation on Wōdejebato was less than 1 metre per year (39 in/year), but erosion by precipitation water and dissolution of parts of the carbonate platform have been inferred from dissolution traces in the rocks. Sea level variations induced the formation of step-like reef tracts on Wōdejebato's carbonate platform.

Much of the reefbuilding was carried out by corals, rudists and stromatoporoids. Unlike present-day coral reefs, reef building in the Cretaceous was carried out mainly by rudists which probably started appearing at Wōdejebato in the Albian; rudist taxa active at Wōdejebato included caprinids and radiolitids, such as Antillocaprina, Coralliochama, Distefanella, Mitrocaprina and Plagioptychus.

Furthermore, benthic foraminifers were active from the Campanian to the Maastrichtian; they include Asterorbis, Pseudorbitoides trechmanni, Omphalocyclus macroporus and Sulcoperculina as well as other discorbids, lituolids, miliolids, opthalmiids, orbitoids, peneroplids, placopsilinids, rotaliids and textulariids.

Other lifeforms that were fossilized in the carbonate reefs were algae including green algae (codiaceans and dasycladaceans) and red algae (corallinaceans, peyseonneliaceans and solenoporaceans); some algae formed rhodoliths. In addition there were bivalves (inoceramids and pycnodonts), bryozoans, corals, gastropods, echinoderms, echinoids, ostracods and sponges.

=== Drowning and post-drowning evolution ===
It is likely that Wōdejebato drowned during the Maastrichtian age around 68 million years ago, probably accompanied by a sea level rise of about 100 metres (330 ft). Before the terminal drowning, Wōdejebato's carbonate platform emerged from the sea, leading to the development of karst features; two separate emersion events took place 68 and 71 million years ago.

Sea level rise on its own probably does not explain the drowning. Various paleoenvironmental stressors have been invoked to explain the drowning such as short-term climate fluctuations during the Maastrichtian and the passage of the seamount through the upwelling zone of the equatorial region. The water in this region may have been too hot for the reef to survive: Other guyots in the Pacific Ocean such as Limalok, Lo-En and Takuyo-Daisan also drowned when they were within ten degrees from the equator on the Southern Hemisphere, implying that this region of the Pacific Ocean was in some way harmful to shallow water reefs. The subsidence that occurred after Wōdejebato moved away from the influence of the Rurutu hotspot may have also played a role. Pikinni was probably higher than Wōdejebato at this time and hence escaped drowning.

After the drowning had taken place, thermal subsidence of the crust beneath Wōdejebato occurring at a rate of 19.5 millimetres per millennium (0.77 in/ka) lowered the platform of Wōdejebato to a depth of about 1.5 kilometres (0.93 mi) below sea level. Between the Maastrichtian and the Eocene, manganese crusts formed on the exposed limestones and gravels formed by erosion; in turn they were subject to alteration processes such as phosphatization during three different episodes in the Eocene.

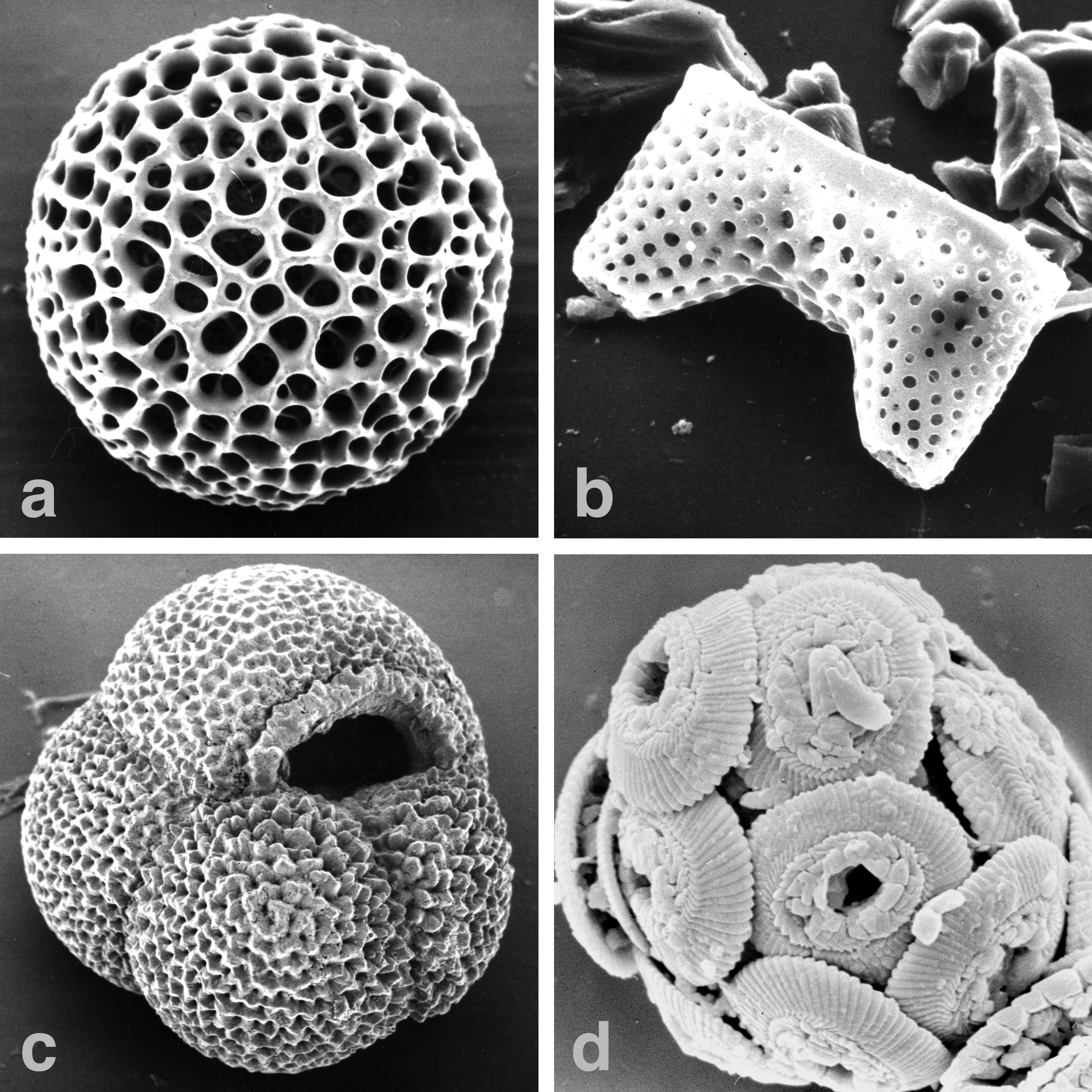
Examples of marine microfossils, including (a) radiolaria, (b) diatoms. (c) foraminifera, and (d) coccolithophores.

Approximately 40 million years passed between the drowning and subsequent deposition events. Pelagic sedimentation took place, which formed an ooze consisting of foraminiferal and nannofossil deposits between the Miocene and Pleistocene, with a Miocene unconformity. In one drill core, this sediment layer is 54 metres (177 ft) thick. Currents affected mid- to late Pleistocene sedimentation. Among the foraminifera deposited here are Florisphaera, Gephyrocapsa, Globigerina, Globorotalia, Helicosphaera, Pseudoemiliania and potentially Sphaeroidinella species. Foraminifera taken from Wōdejebato usually belong to pelagic species. Ostracods have also been identified; common taxa are cytherurids as well as Bradleya, Cytheralison and Krithe species.

Presently, Wōdejebato lies below the thermocline and the temperature of the water washing over the seamount is about 10 °C (50 °F). Circumstantial evidence indicates that deep seawater dissolved large amounts of carbonate rocks including aragonite after Wōdejebato was submerged; the seamount is located below the aragonite saturation depth and that causes the aragonite to dissolve. Some of the dissolved aragonite has precipitated again in the form of calcite, and sediments have partially filled cavities within the carbonate rocks.
