= Flag of Bikini Atoll =

Flag of a member of the Marshall Islands

Flag of Bikini Atoll

The flag of Bikini Atoll, a member of the Marshall Islands, closely resembles the flag of the United States and was adopted in 1987. The flag is symbolic of the islanders' position that a great debt is still owed by the U.S. government to the people of Bikini following the 1954 detonation of the Castle Bravo hydrogen bomb on the island, poisoning islanders and other nearby atolls with nuclear fallout.

== Design ==
The 23 white stars in the canton of the flag represent the 23 islands of Bikini Atoll. The three black stars in the upper right represent the three islands (Bokonijien, Aerokojlol and part of Namu) that were destroyed in March 1954 during the 15-megaton Bravo test by the United States. The two black stars in the lower right corner represent where the Bikinians live now, Kili Island, 425 miles (684 km) to the south of Bikini Atoll, and Ejit Island of Majuro Atoll. These two stars are symbolically far away from Bikini's stars on the flag as the islands are in real life (both in distance and quality of life).

The Marshallese language words on the flag, MEN OTEMJEJ REJ ILO BEIN ANIJ (modern spelling MEN WŌTŌMJEJ REJ ILO PEIN ANIJ, English: Everything is in the hands of God), was the reply Bikinian leader Juda gave to U.S. Commodore Ben Wyatt in 1946 when the Americans asked the islanders to give up their islands for "the good of mankind and to end all world wars".

== Symbolism ==
The similarity to the American flag design and the striking isolation of the 3-star group and the 2-star group represent the position of the islanders that the Government of the United States still has obligations to their people, including reparations for the nuclear testing and resettlement of the Bikinians who were exiled.
