= Nauru Basin =

Basin surrounding Nauru

Nauru Basin is an area in the Pacific Ocean of the Marshall Islands, around the Nauru area, hence its name. It is composed of many different islands and seamounts.

Wōdejebato is one source of turbidites in the Nauru Basin.
