= Pitcairn hotspot =

The approximate current location of Pitcairn hotspot is the Adams seamount superimposed on the seafloor height abnormality modelled for the South Pacific superswell
Legend
- Key for the depth anomaly:
- 0 meters or more
- 250 meters or more
- 500 meters or more

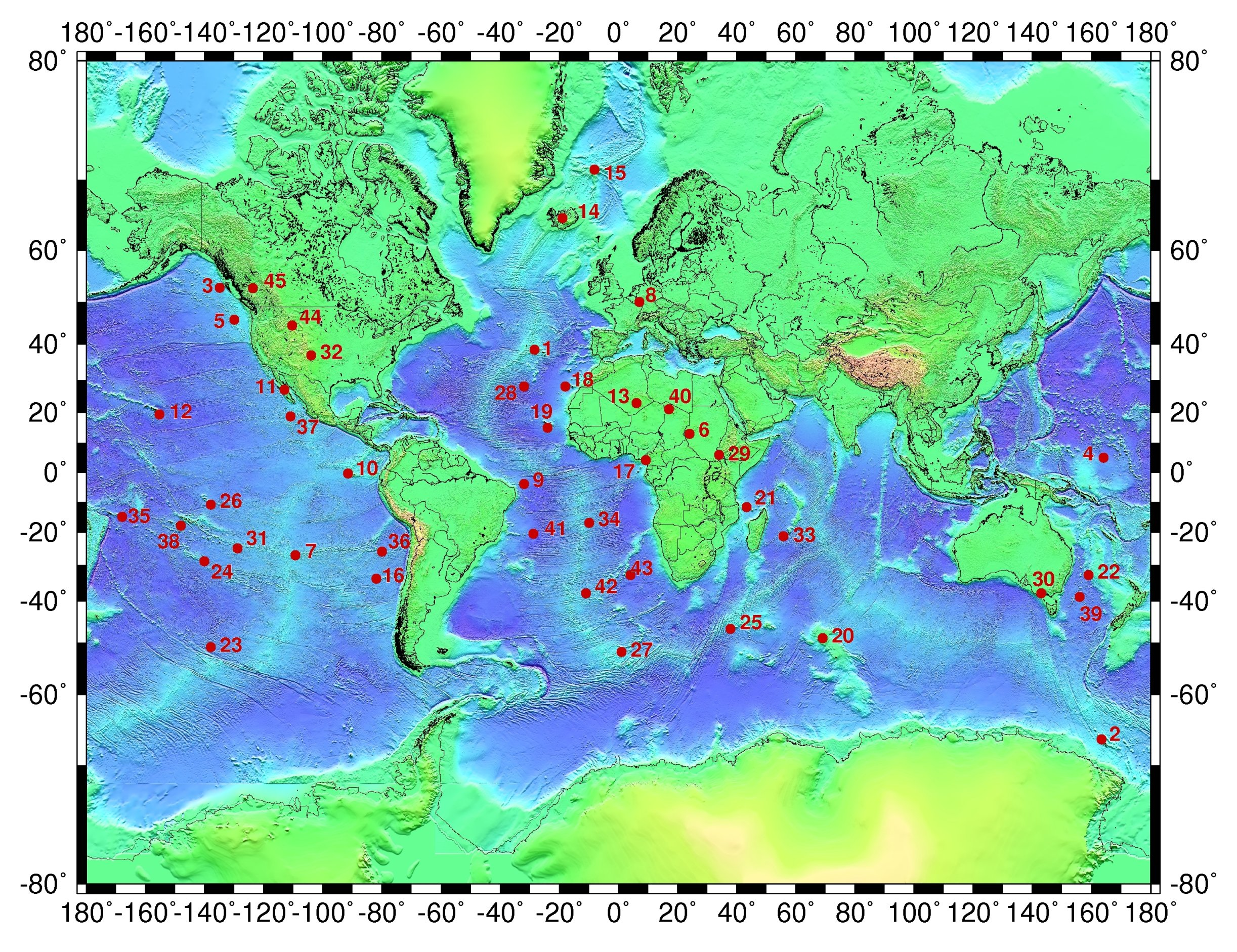
The Pitcairn hotspot is marked 31 on map.

The Pitcairn hotspot is a volcanic hotspot located in the south-central Pacific Ocean. Over the past 11 million years, it has formed the Pitcairn-Gambier hotspot chain. It is responsible for creating the Pitcairn Islands and two large seamounts named Adams and Bounty, as well as atolls at Moruroa, Fangataufa and the Gambier Islands. The hotspot is currently located at Adams and Bounty, which are ~60 kilometres (37 miles) East-Southeast of Pitcairn Island.

== Current hotspot location ==
The current hotspot location is west of the spreading center known as the East Pacific Rise; an area near where the Nazca plate and the Pacific plate are diverging around 20°S, 115°W. This is where material is thought to be sourced from the core-mantle boundary, rising to surface as a localized plume. Opponents of the hotspot theory instead attribute Pitcairn hotspot to upwelling at the western end of the Easter fracture zone. Whatever, from seismic P wave studies the South Pacific superswell is linked to the Pitcairn hotspot at top of its superplume at 400–500 km (250–310 mi) depth.

=== Morphology ===
Multibeam bathymetry shows that the two largest seamounts, Adams and Bounty, rise 2,000 m (6,600 ft) above the seafloor. Several other smaller, volcanically active seamounts exist that are shorter than 2,000 m (6,600 ft) in height. Bathymetry records have estimated the volume of erupted lava due to volcanic activity to be about 5,900 km^{3} (1,400 cu mi) within a radius of about 110 kilometres (68 miles).

=== Petrology ===
The larger edifices show much more extensive volcanic activity and a wider range of compositions than the smaller. The four different types of rocks that are erupted are classified as either picrite basalt, alkali basalt, trachyandesite and trachyte. Areas have been observed on Bounty showing pillow basalts and giant tubular basalt to tabular/blocky trachy-andesite and trachyte flows scattered across the slope of the seamount. Pyroclasts and hyaloclastites have also been observed on the main seamounts displaying a geologic history of the seamounts and past environment around them.

== Pitcairn-Gambier hotspot chain ==
The hotspot has formed a chain of seamounts over the past 11 million years with several other large seamounts along the chain as well, organized from older to younger the further east you go. Some of these islands make up the Pitcairn Islands. They are named the Pitcairn proper, Henderson, Ducie and Oeno. The islands were first discovered by Europeans in 1767 and it is considered one of the most remote islands inhabited on earth. Multibeam bathymetry and bottom imaging has shown there to be hundreds or volcanic structures in a 9500 square kilometer area around the Pitcairn Island area. East of the main island, there are several active volcanoes that are only just below the surface, less than 500 meters deep.

=== Morphology ===
Several seamounts makes up the Pitcairn-Gambier hotspot chain. These include Moruroa, now an atoll that formed about 11 Ma, Fangataufa, now an atoll that formed about 10 Ma, Gambier Islands, islands and atolls that formed about 6.5 Ma, Pitcairn Islands about 0.7 Ma and Pitcairn seamounts about 0.5 Ma. This chain spreads from 21.5 degrees S, 139 degrees W to 25 degrees S, 129.5 degrees W.

=== Geochemistry ===
The seamount chain has varying ratios of ^{206}Pb/^{204}Pb isotopic composition, ranging from 18.99 to 19.62, depending on how far away from where the hotspot currently lies and how long ago it was formed by the hotspot. Ratios of 87Sr/ 86Sr were calculated to range between 0.70292 and 0.70367 and ratios of ^{143}Nd/^{144}Nd were calculated to be between 0.51303 and 0.51288. Trace element ratios seemed relatively constant during tests.

== Formation ==
Using methods of modeling of lead isotopes, the date set for different rocks around Pitcairn hotspot were estimated to be from 0.6 and 0.7 Ma. The hotspot has four islands that have formed since the hotspot's origin.

== See also ==
- Arago hotspot
- Macdonald hotspot
- Rarotonga hotspot
