= List of volcanoes in the Pacific Ocean =

A list of active and extinct volcanoes in the Pacific Ocean.

== List ==
Name	Elevation		Location	Last eruption
Name	meters	feet	Coordinates	Last eruption
Bowie Seamount	-24	-79	53.3°N 135.63°W	18,000 BC
Adams Seamount	-59	-194	25.37°S 129.27°W	50 BCE
Axial Seamount	-1410	4626	45.95°N 130.00°W	1998
Bounty Seamount	-450		25°11′S 129°23′W	
Cleft Segment	-2140	-7021	44.83°N 130.30°W	1986
Coaxial Segment	-2400	-7874	46.52°N 129.58°W	1993
Foundation Seamounts				
Hawaiian–Emperor seamount chain				2022
Kamaʻehuakanaloa Seamount (Loihi)			33°N 158°E	1996

== See also ==
- Volcanoes of the Pacific Ocean
- List of volcanoes in the Hawaiian – Emperor seamount chain
- Volcanoes of Oceania
