= Vanavana =

Atoll in French Polynesia

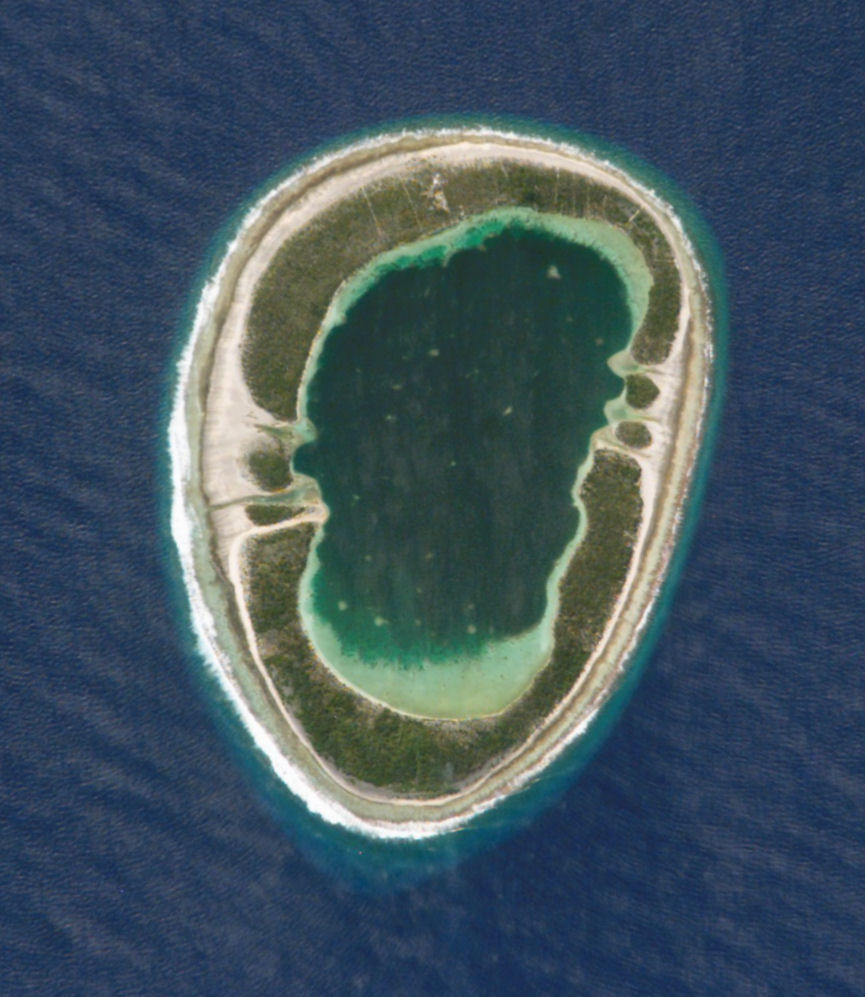
- NASA picture of Vanavana Atoll

- Location within French Polynesia

Geography
- Location: Pacific Ocean
- Coordinates: 20°47′S 139°10′W
- Archipelago: Tuamotus
- Area: 6 km^{2} (2.3 sq mi) (lagoon); 5 km^{2} (2 sq mi) (above water)
- Length: 3.5 km (2.17 mi)
- Width: 2.2 km (1.37 mi)

Administration
- France
- Overseas collectivity: French Polynesia
- Administrative subdivision: Tuamotus
- Commune: Tureia

Demographics
- Population: Uninhabited (2012)

Vanavana, Kurataki, or Huataki is an atoll in the southeastern area of the Tuamotu Archipelago, French Polynesia. Vanavana's nearest neighbour is Tureia, which is located 58 kilometres (36 miles) to the east.

Vanavana is a small oval-shaped atoll. It measures approximately 3.5 kilometres (2.2 miles) in length, has a maximum width of 2.2 kilometres (1.4 miles) and a land area of approximately 5 square kilometres (1.9 square miles). Its reef encloses completely the deep lagoon, which is 6 square kilometres (2.3 square miles). There is one hook-shaped large island in the north and another in the south of its reef.

Vanavana Atoll is uninhabited; however, buildings on the northern end of the island are present.

== History ==
The first recorded European to arrive at Vanavana was British mariner Captain Frederick Beechey in 1826. He named this atoll "Barrow Island", after Sir John Barrow.

== Administration ==
Administratively Vanavana Atoll belongs to the commune of Tureia, which includes the atolls of Tureia, Fangataufa, Moruroa, Tematangi and Vanavana.
