= Fangataufa =

Atoll in French Polynesia

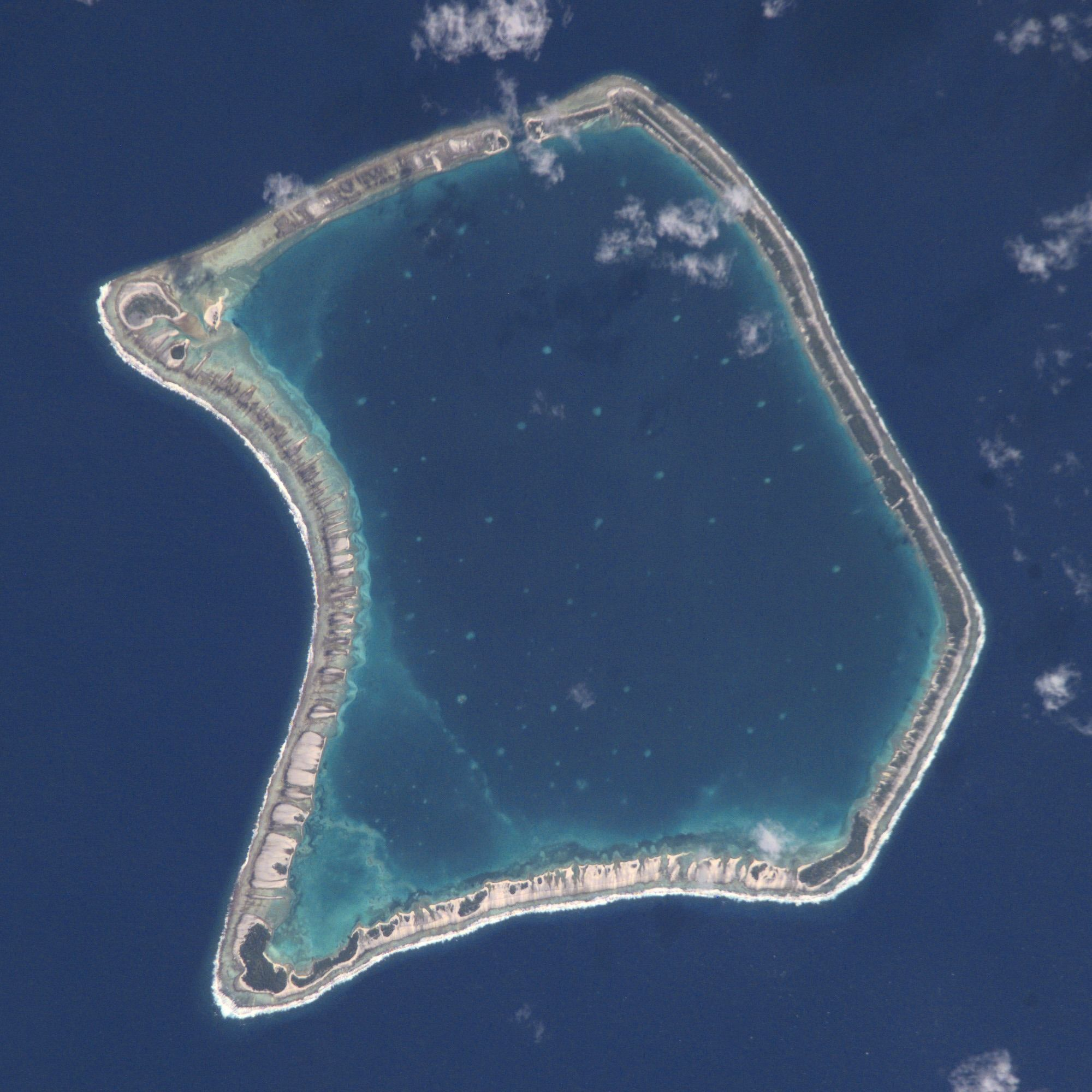
- Satellite view of Fangataufa Atoll showing the dark blue depths of the induced crater. Courtesy NASA.

- Location within French Polynesia
- Interactive map of Fangataufa

Geography
- Location: Pacific Ocean
- Coordinates: 22°15′S 138°45′W
- Archipelago: Tuamotus
- Area: 45 km^{2} (17 sq mi) (lagoon); 5 km^{2} (2 sq mi) (above water)
- Length: 9.5 km (5.9 mi)
- Width: 9.5 km (5.9 mi)

Administration
- France
- Overseas collectivity: French Polynesia
- Administrative subdivision: Tuamotus
- Commune: Tureia

Demographics
- Population: Uninhabited (2012)

Fangataufa (or Fangatafoa) is an uninhabited coral atoll in the eastern part of the Tuamotu Archipelago in French Polynesia. The atoll has been fully owned by the French state since 1964. From 1966 to 1996 it was used as a nuclear test site by the French government. In total, 4 atmospheric and 10 underground nuclear explosions were carried out on the atoll.

== Geography ==
The atoll is a coral outgrowth of a seamount which rises some 3,600 metres (11,800 feet) from the seafloor, to a depth of −345 metres (−1,132 feet). The seamount was formed 33.4 - 34.7 million years ago by the Pitcairn hotspot. The island is approx. 9.5 kilometres (5.9 miles) long and 9.5 kilometres (5.9 miles) wide. It has a lagoon area of 45 square kilometres (17 square miles) and a land area of 5 kilometres (3.1 miles). It is located 37 kilometres (23 miles) south of Moruroa atoll, 197 kilometres (122 miles) east of Tematangi, 240 kilometres (150 miles) southwest of the Gambier Islands and 1,190 kilometres (740 miles) southeast of Tahiti.

Access to the lagoon is through a pass lying 0.5 miles (0.8 kilometres) SW of the northernmost point of the atoll; the channel has a width of about 60 metres (200 feet) and a dredged depth of 6.5 metres (21.3 feet). A 12-metre-long (39-foot) quay, in 2.5 metres (8.2 feet) of water, is situated in the NE part of the lagoon; another quay, 50 metres (160 feet) long in 5 metres (16 feet) of water, and landing ramps, were constructed in its E part. The access channel is marked, on each side, by two beacons. There is an abandoned airfield, built to accommodate medium size transport aircraft, on the NE coast of the atoll.

== History ==
The first recorded European to arrive at Fangataufa Atoll was Frederick William Beechey in 1826, who gave it the name "Cockburn island" in honour of George Cockburn.

=== Nuclear test site ===
Occasionally occupied during the 20th century, the atoll was selected by France in 1963 for use as a nuclear test site to replace Reggane and In Ecker in the Algerian Sahara. Along with Mururoa, it was formally ceded to France by the Territorial Assembly in 1964.

The first nuclear test at Fangataufa was Rigel, an atmospheric test, conducted on 24 September 1966. This was followed by three more atmospheric tests, including Canopus, France's first two-stage thermonuclear test, on 24 August 1968. The last atmospheric test was Orion, on 2 August 1970.

Following increasing criticism from Pacific countries, France switched to underground testing. Preparations began in 1974, and the first test, Achille, was carried out on 5 June 1975. This was followed by a second test, Hector, on 30 November 1975. Testing then moved exclusively to Mururoa until 1988, when growing safety concerns around the stability of Muroroa's atoll saw some testing move to Fangataufa. Eight further underground tests were conducted on the atoll, with the final one, Xouthos occurring on 27 January 1996.

=== Since 1998 ===
Today, Fangataufa serves as a wildlife sanctuary for various species of birds. It is permanently uninhabited, and is classified as a Common Military Zone. The zone includes the lagoon areas enclosed by the atoll and by baselines linking the closest points emerging from the reef on both sides of the channel. Entry is prohibited without authorization. The atoll has been the subject of radiological monitoring since 1998 with an annual environmental sampling campaign carried out by Defense personnel and the Atomic Energy Commission (CEA).

In February 2006 an inquiry by the French Polynesian government found that the French government had lied to the local population about the effects of atmospheric testing. On 15 October 2006, the Assembly of French Polynesia adopted a report on the consequences of nuclear testing which concluded that "nuclear testing has had a major impact on health, the environment, society and the Polynesian economy". The Economic, Social and Cultural Council at the start of this report recommends that "the State recognizes the nuclear fact and assumes its full responsibility accordingly". In November 2008 the French government agreed to compensate military personnel involved in the tests.

In February 2021, the French National Institute of Health and Medical Research INSERM published a report entitled "Nuclear tests and health - Consequences in French Polynesia". The objective of this study was to establish an assessment of the available international scientific knowledge on the health consequences of the atmospheric nuclear tests conducted by France in French Polynesia, on the general population and former civilian and military workers.

== Administration ==
Administratively Fangataufa Atoll is part of the commune of Tureia, which includes the atolls of Tureia, Moruroa, Tematangi and Vanavana.

In January 2012 French Polynesian President Oscar Temaru called for the return of Fangataufa and Mururoa. A bill to return the atolls by Senator Richard Tuheiava passed the Senate of France in 2012, but had not yet been debated by the French National Assembly by the time it was meant to take effect in 2014.

== See also ==
- Force de frappe
