= Tureia =

Atoll in French Polynesia

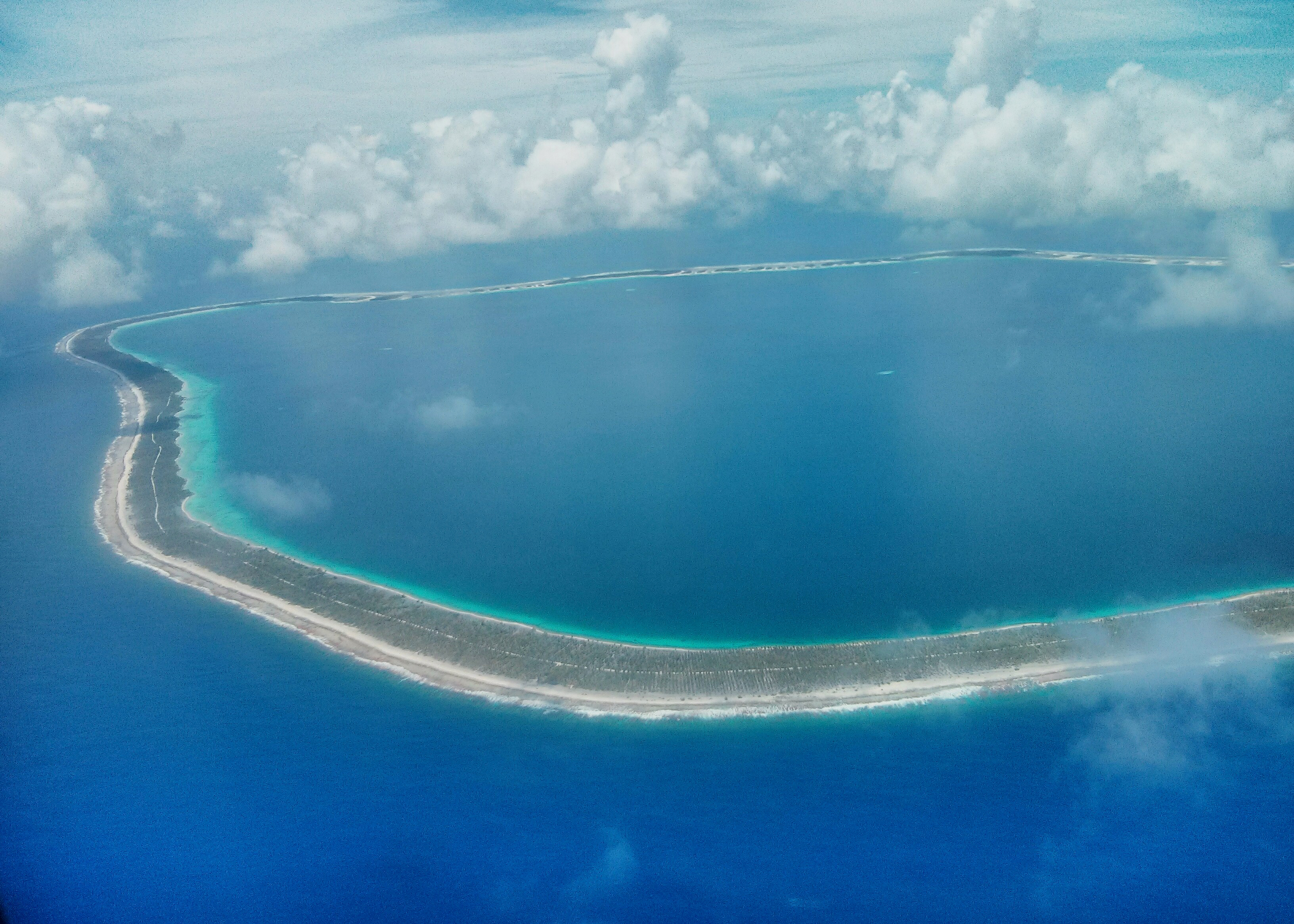
- Tureia

- Location within French Polynesia

Geography
- Location: Pacific Ocean
- Coordinates: 20°46′16″S 138°33′53″W
- Archipelago: Tuamotus
- Area: 47 km^{2} (18 sq mi) (lagoon); 8 km^{2} (3 sq mi) (above water)
- Length: 15 km (9.3 mi)
- Width: 8 km (5 mi)

Administration
- France
- Overseas collectivity: French Polynesia
- Administrative subdivision: Tuamotus
- Commune: Tureia
- Largest settlement: Hakamaru

Demographics
- Population: 275 (2017)

Tureia
- Commune
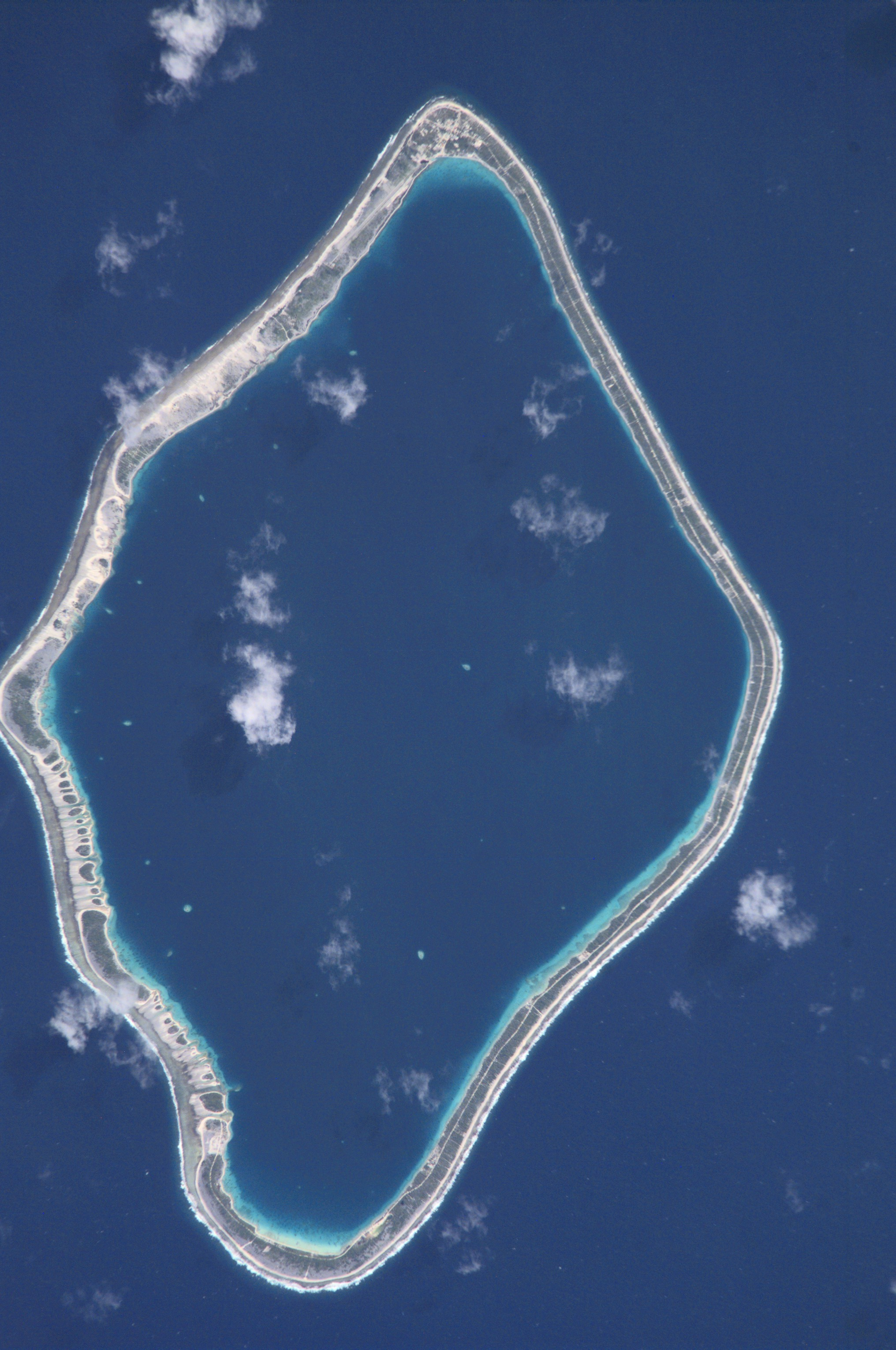
- NASA image of Tureia Atoll.

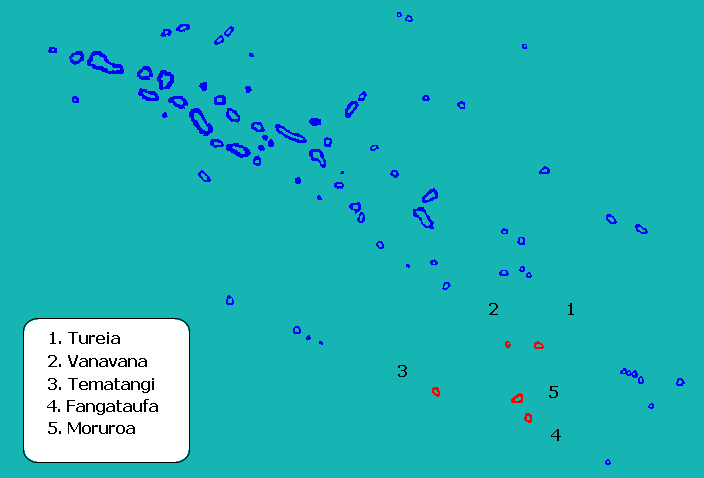
- Location of Tureia
- Coordinates: 20°46′16″S 138°33′53″W
- Country: France
- Overseas collectivity: French Polynesia
- Subdivision: Îles Tuamotu-Gambier
- Area^{1}: 8 km^{2} (3.1 sq mi)
- Population (2022): 261
  - Density: 33/km^{2} (84/sq mi)
- Time zone: UTC−10:00
- INSEE/Postal code: 98755 /
- ^{1} French Land Register data, which excludes lakes, ponds, glaciers > 1 km^{2} (0.386 sq mi or 247 acres) and river estuaries.

Tureia (also called Papahena, Papakena, and Carysfort Island) is an atoll in the Tuamotu Archipelago in French Polynesia.

Tureia atoll is 15 km long and 8 kilometres (5.0 miles) across at its widest; its total land area is 8 km². A very long island completely covers its eastern reef. The lagoon has no navigable entrance.

The village of Hakamaru (or Fakamaru) is the only settlement on Tureia, at the northern tip of the atoll. Almost all of the arable land on Tureia is dedicated to growing coconuts. The population in this atoll has risen to 275 in 2017; in 1977 there were only 121 inhabitants.

== History ==
The first recorded European to arrive at Tureia was Captain Edward Edwards in 1791, during his search for the Bounty mutineers. Edwards called the atoll "Carysfort", after John Proby, 1st Earl of Carysfort.

From 1966 to 1999, Tureia hosted an outpost of the Centre d'Expérimentation du Pacifique, the French authority supervising nuclear tests on the nearby atolls of Moruroa and Fangataufa, which lie about 115 km south of Tureia. There was also a weather station on Tureia during those years. Currently, both installations have been abandoned.

This atoll has a 900 m-long airstrip (IATA: ZTA, ICAO: NTGY). Tureia Airport was inaugurated in 1985.

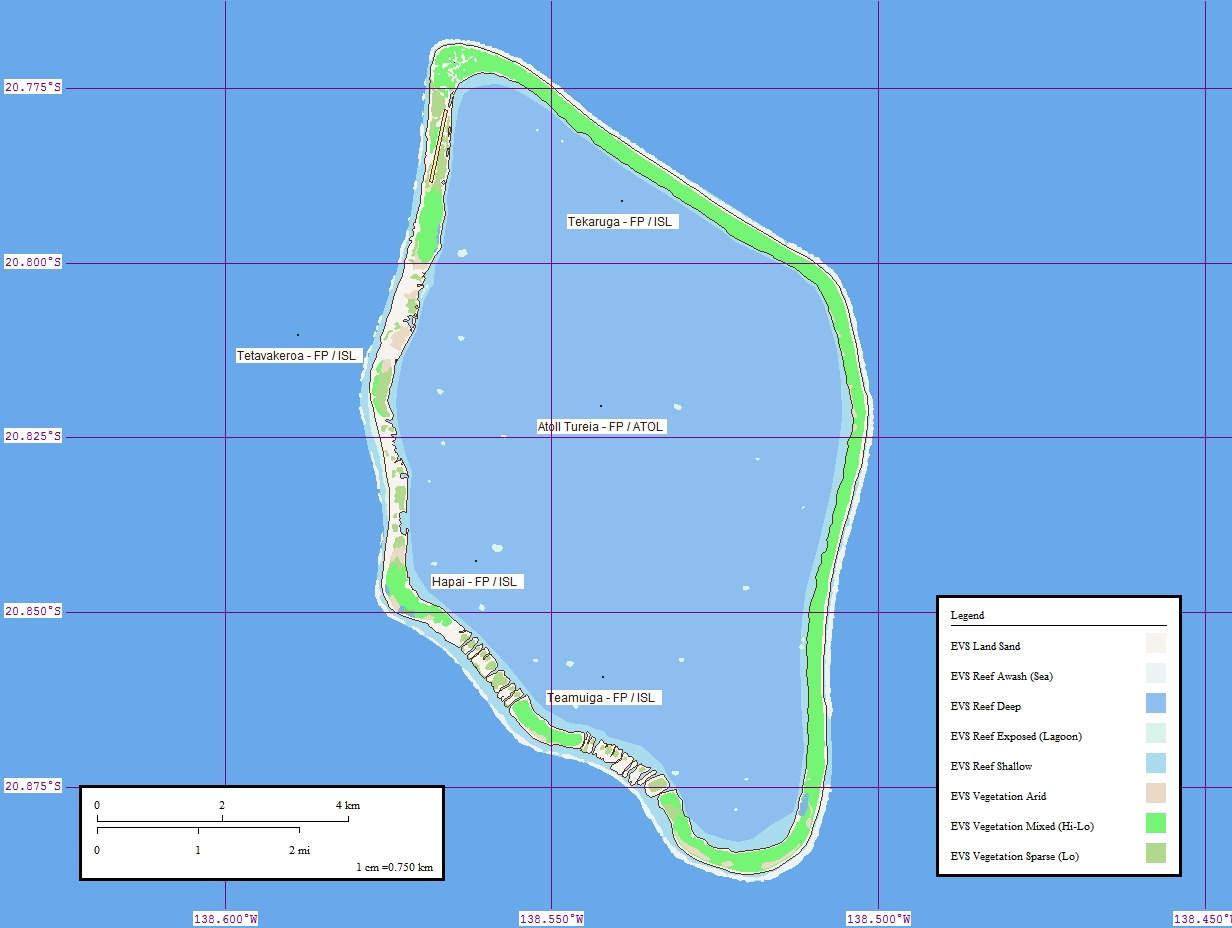
Map of Tureia Atoll, Tuamotu Archipelago, French Polynesia

== Administration ==
Administratively, Tureia Atoll is part of the commune of Tureia, which also includes the atolls of Fangataufa, Moruroa, Tematangi and Vanavana.
