= Tematagi =

Atoll in French Polynesia

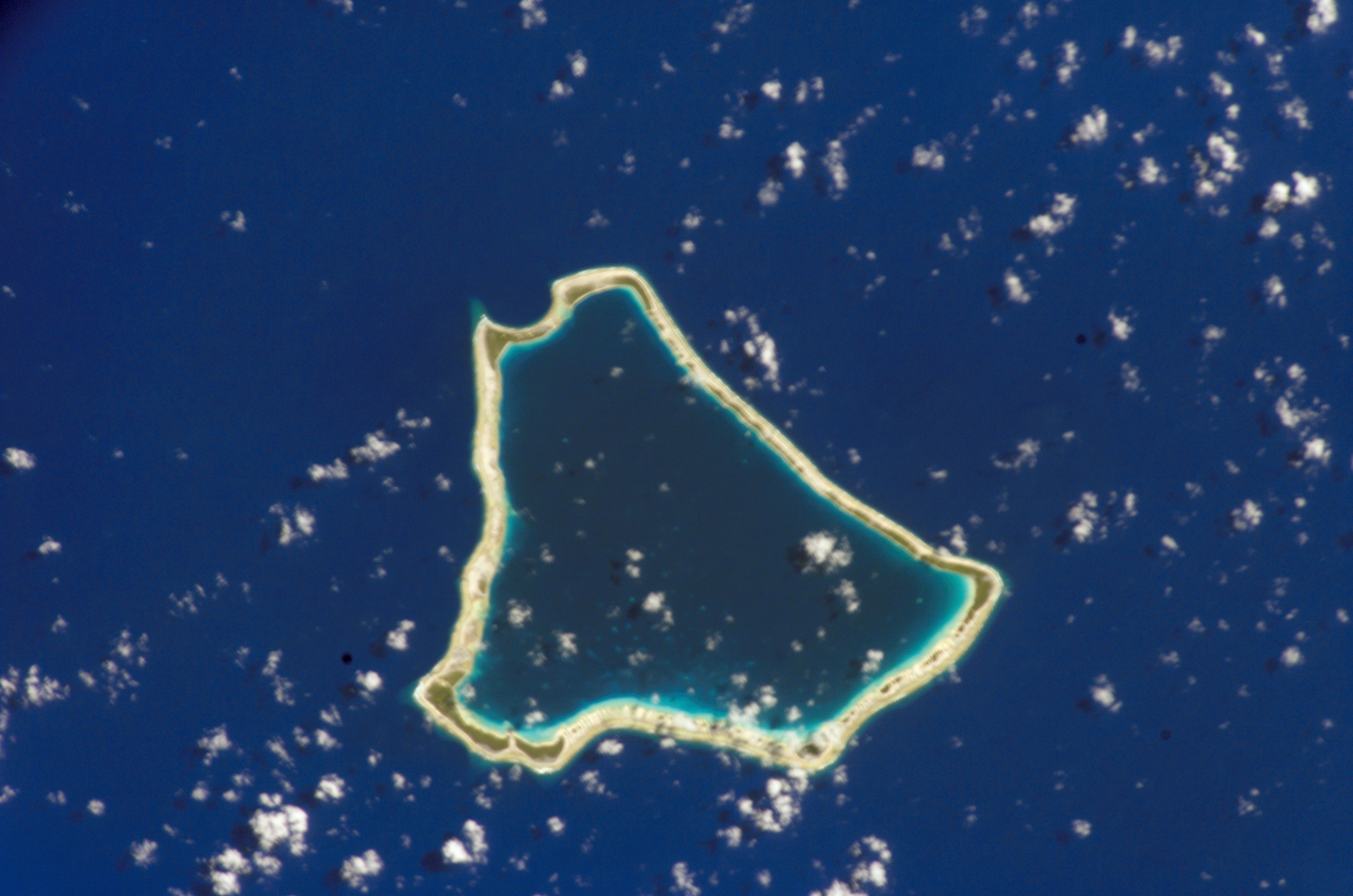
- NASA picture of Tematagi Atoll

- Location within French Polynesia

Geography
- Location: Pacific Ocean
- Coordinates: 21°40′S 140°37′W
- Archipelago: Tuamotus
- Area: 61 km^{2} (24 sq mi) (lagoon); 7.7 km^{2} (3.0 sq mi) (above water)
- Length: 11.5 km (7.15 mi)
- Width: 7 km (4.3 mi)

Administration
- France
- Overseas collectivity: French Polynesia
- Administrative subdivision: Tuamotus
- Commune: Tureia

Demographics
- Population: 58 (2012)

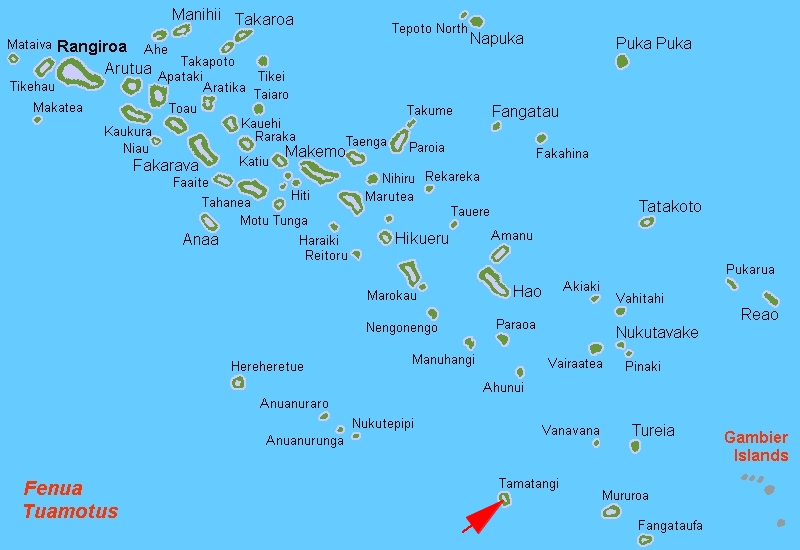
Location of Tematagi Atoll

Tematagi or Tematangi is an atoll in the southeastern area of the Tuamotu Archipelago, French Polynesia. Tematagi's nearest neighbour is Mururoa, which is located 161 kilometres (100 miles) to the ESE.

Tematagi is a medium-sized atoll. It measures approximately 11.5 kilometres (7.1 miles) in length and has a maximum width of 7 kilometres (4.3 miles) with a land area of almost 8 square kilometres (3.1 square miles). As its reef completely encloses the deep lagoon, which is 61 square kilometres (24 square miles), there is no navigable pass to enter the lagoon.

There are many relatively large islands on Tematagi's reef, as well as a few small motu. The main village is Tuihana. There were 58 inhabitants on Tematagi in the last census.

== History ==
The first recorded European to visit this atoll was Captain William Bligh on the ship Providence on April 5, 1792. At the time of Bligh's visit, it was uninhabited. Tematagi Atoll appears in some maps as "Bligh's Lagoon Island".

When Frederick Beechey visited Tematagi in 1826 he found inhabitants there. In 1857, the captain of the Julia, coasting along Tematagi Atoll saw armed natives follow the course of his schooner... "clad in many-coloured stuffs".

== Population ==
In 1966, Catholic missionary Father Victor Valleys mentioned in a letter to his bishop that he had planted 135,000 coconut trees on the islands. Teams of workers from neighboring atolls spent three or four months a year at Tematagi harvesting copra. Legally, the atoll did not belong in the public domain of Polynesia: a document states that "the atoll of Tematagi was granted a final license to SCI Tematagi Vanavana in 1974." This SCI was led by Valleys and ceased operation with his death in 1986.

A pontoon landing was built at the village of Teakoro, along with a church and administrative buildings. The legal status of the population is not clear since the atoll remains the property of SCI, under the guise of a Catholic Mission. Transactions were even made in 1998 between the vice-president of French Polynesia and Bruno Wan, a pearl prospector. In 2001, the village had 36 residents. The atoll has no airstrip, but, since 2015 there has been a telephone and fax service via satellite.

== Antipodes of Mecca ==
Tematagi is the closest landmass to the antipode of Mecca. This means that the correct direction of Muslim prayer (qibla) varies widely between Tematagi and its neighboring islands. The exact antipode of Tematagi, however, is a point roughly 4 kilometers northwest of the Jeddah Eastern Forest, a recreation area east of the Saudi-Arabian harbour city of Jeddah (about 55 kilometers from Mecca itself).

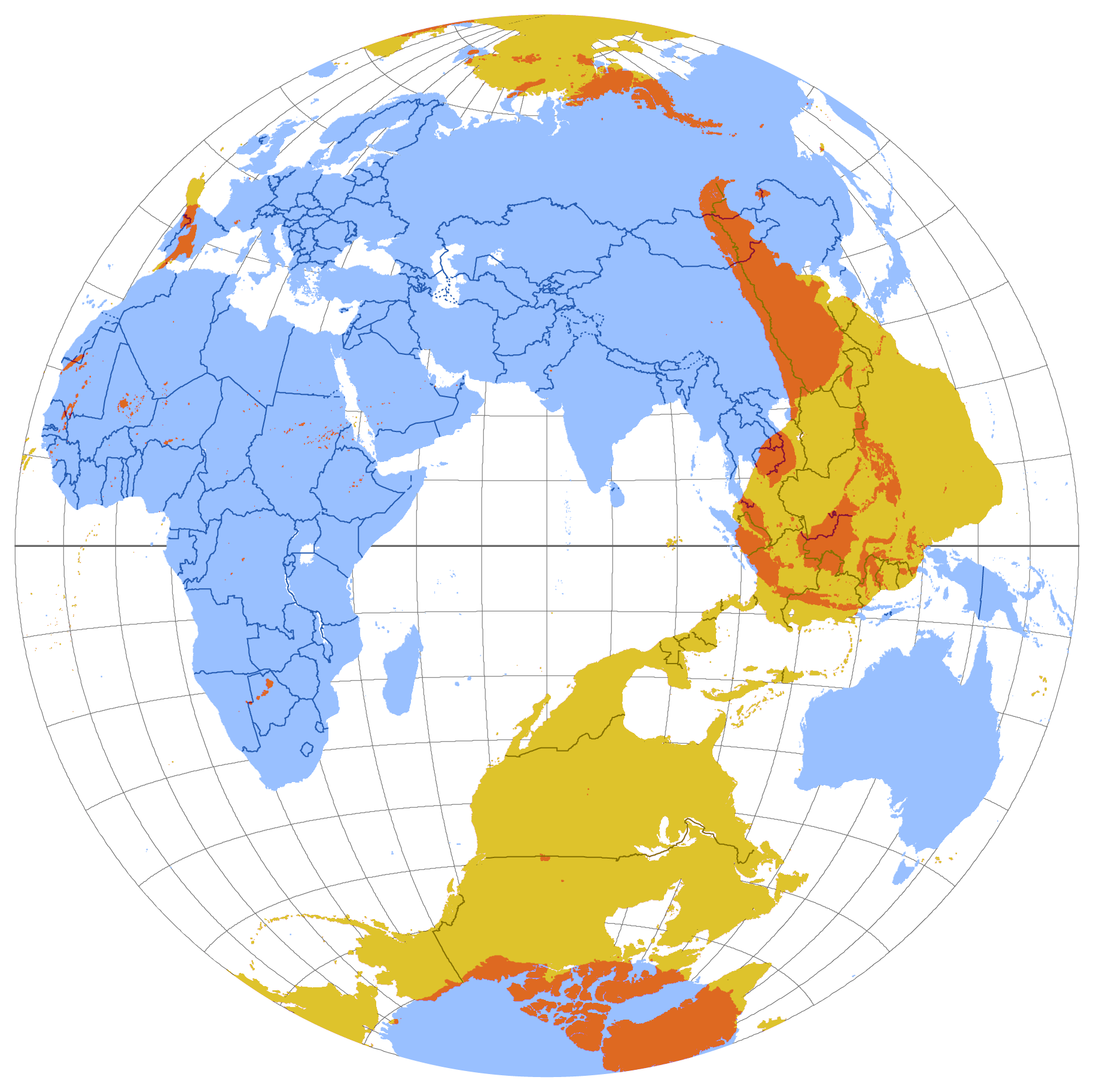
This map shows the antipodes of each point on the Earth's surface; the points where the blue and yellow overlap are land antipodes (most land has its antipodes in the ocean). Both Mecca and Tematagi are to the upper left of the center of the map.

== Administration ==
Administratively Tematagi belongs to the commune of Tureia, which includes the atolls of Tureia, Fangataufa, Moruroa, Tematagi and Vanavana.

== Images & Maps ==
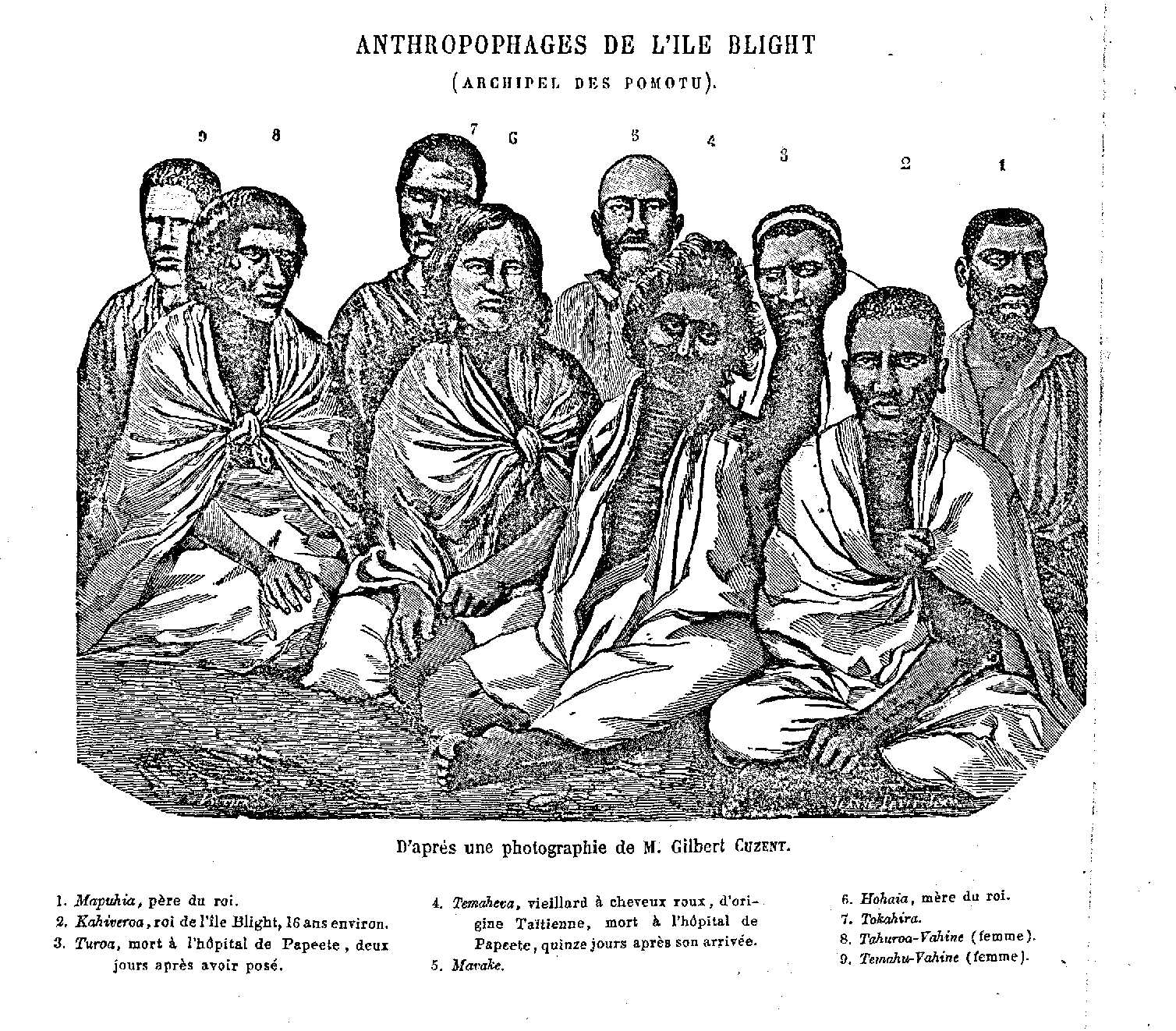
Inhabitants of Tematagi, removed to Tahiti in 1857 for killing and eating the survivors of the shipwrecked schooner Sarah Ann

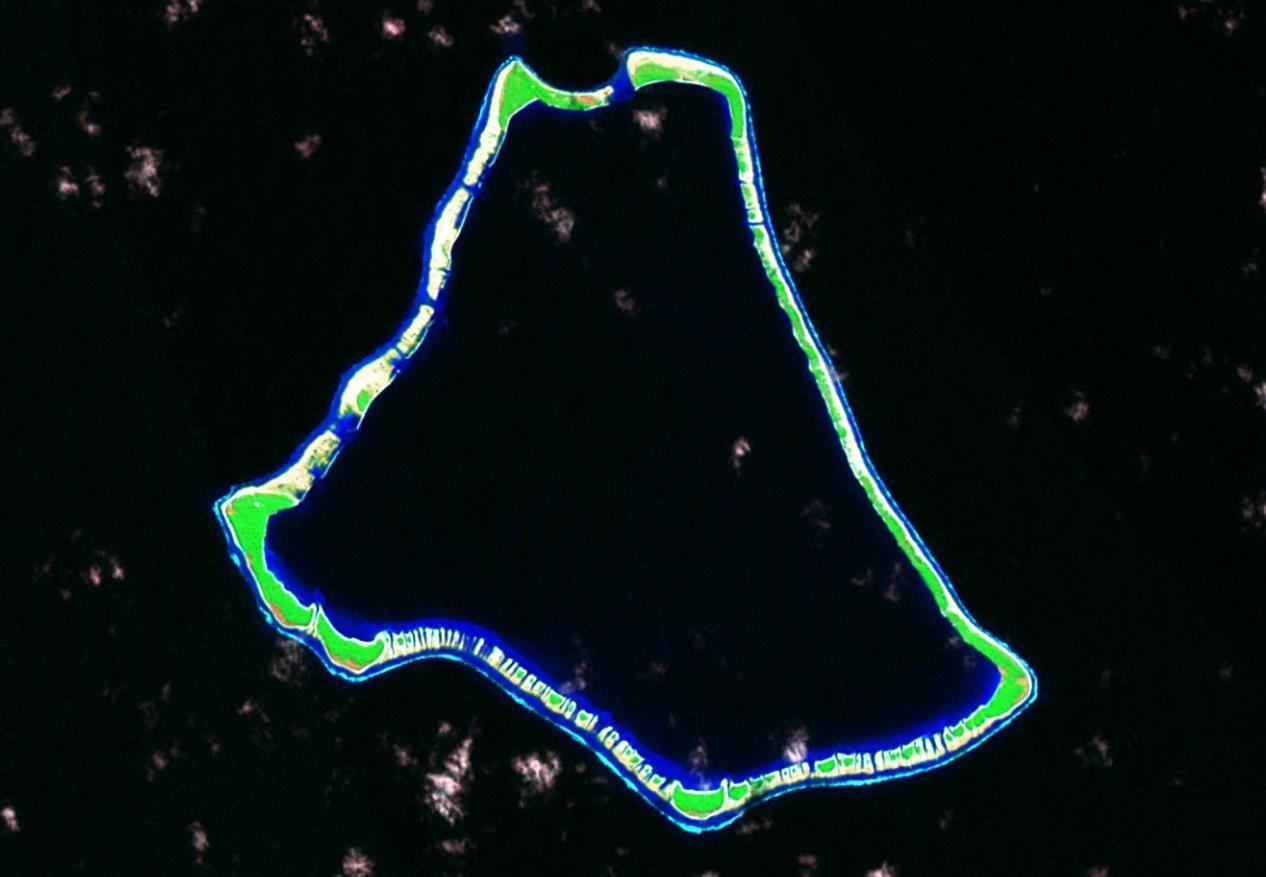
Image Source: Landsat S-07-20_2000 (1:70,000)

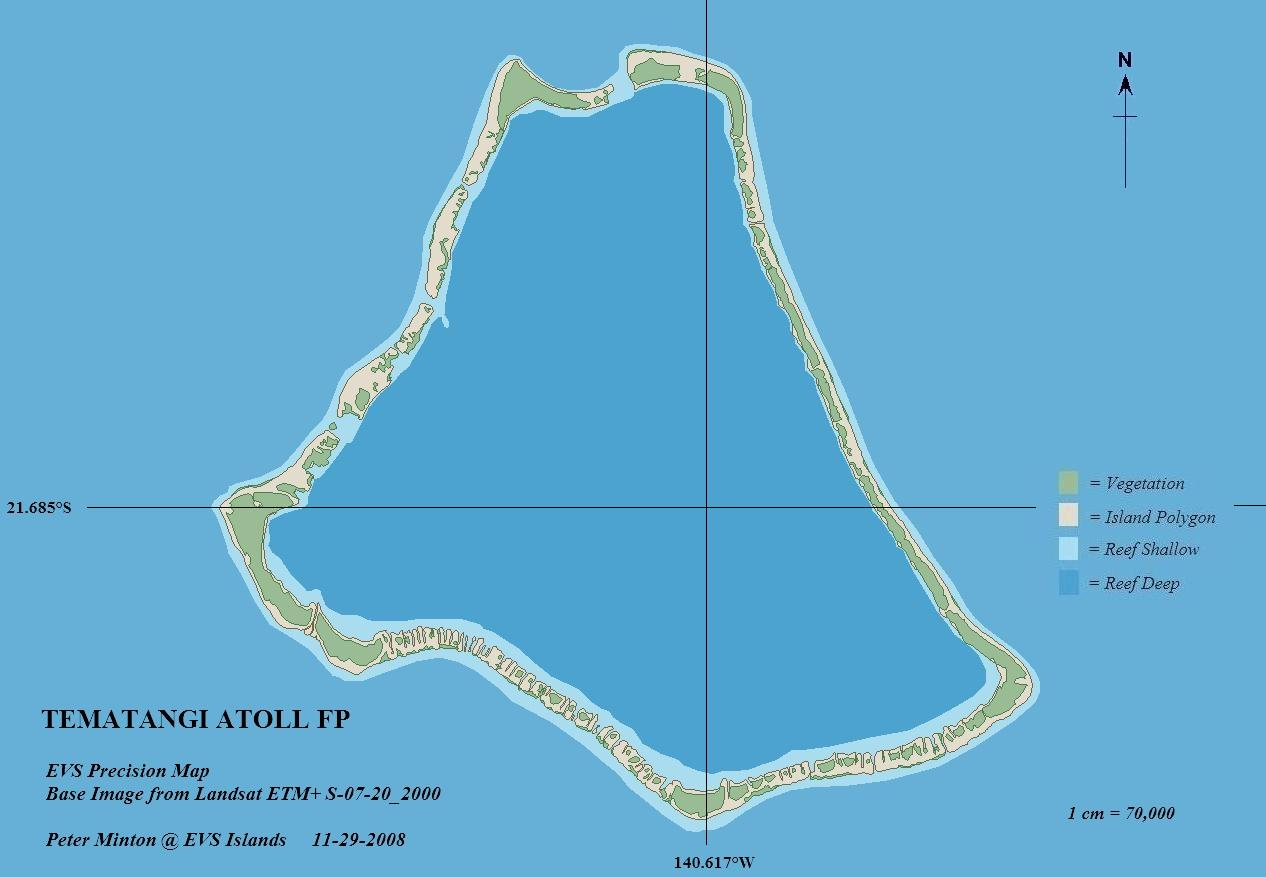
Map Source: EVS Precision Map (1:70,000)
