= Adams Seamount =

Submarine volcano above the Pitcairn hotspot in the central Pacific Ocean

Adams Seamount, Forty Mile Reef
- Summit depth: 39 m (128 ft)
- Height: 3,500 m (11,500 ft)

Location
- Location: Pacific Ocean, SW of Pitcairn Island
- Coordinates: 25°22′S 129°16′W

Geology
- Last eruption: 50 BCE ± 1000 years

Adams Seamount (also known as Forty Mile Reef) is a submarine volcano above the Pitcairn hotspot in the central Pacific Ocean about 100 kilometres (62 mi) southwest of Pitcairn Island.

== Geography and geomorphology ==
Adams is part of a field of about 90 seamounts 90 kilometres (56 mi) east-southeast away from Pitcairn Island, and the largest of these. Adams lies southeast of another large seamount, Bounty Seamount. Most of these seamounts except for Adams and Bounty are less than 0.5 kilometres (0.31 mi) high. They were discovered in 1989 by the RV Sonne research ship.

It is a conical seamount rising 3,500 metres (11,483 ft) from the sea floor to about 39 metres (128 ft) or 59–75 metres (194–246 ft) below the surface of the ocean. The total volume of the seamount, whose base has a diameter of about 30 kilometres (19 mi), is about 858 cubic kilometres (206 cu mi). Adams has two summits, and coral and sand derived from coral has been found on Adams. Given its height, during the Last Glacial Maximum Adams was likely an island.

Its slopes are covered by recent lava flows, volcanic debris and hyaloclastite. Lava flows feature aa lava characteristics and lava tubes, while deeper parts of the edifice are covered with lapilli and scoria. Parasitic vents form cones and mounds on its flanks.

== Geology ==
Adams and the other seamounts were created by the Pitcairn hotspot, and these seamounts are its present-day location. This hotspot is one among several hotspots in the Pacific Ocean, and are associated with the South Pacific superswell, as are the Austral hotspot, and Society hotspot. The seamounts rise from a 30 million years old crust.

Alkali basalt, trachyte and tholeiite have been dredged from Adams Seamount.

== Eruption history ==
The fresh appearance of samples and the lack of sedimentation indicates that Adams Seamount is a recently active seamount. Potassium-argon dating of rocks dredged from Adams Seamount has yielded Holocene ages, including one age of 3,000 ± 1,000 years before present. Other ages range from 4,000 - 7,000 years before present. Unlike Bounty, Adams Seamount displays no active hydrothermal system.

== Biology ==
Adams seamount features a coral reef, one of the deepest tropical reefs in the world. It is mainly formed by Pocillopora sp. and Porites deformis corals, but also many reef fish and sharks; it is used as a fishing ground by Pitcairn. Adams seamount is part of the Pitcairn Islands Marine Reserve.
