= Bounty Seamount =

Seamount in the Pacific Ocean near Pitcairn Island

- Summit depth: 420 metres (1,380 ft)

Location
- Coordinates: 25°11′S 129°23′W

Bounty Seamount is a seamount in the Pacific Ocean, which reaches a depth of 420 metres (1,380 ft) or 450 metres (1,480 ft). It is about 3,950 metres (12,960 ft) high.

== Geology and geomorphology ==
The seamount is part of a group of seamounts about 100 kilometres (62 mi) away from Pitcairn Island, which includes several small seamounts and the large Adams Seamount. These seamounts were discovered in 1989.

Bounty has a conical shape, with three summit cones and several rift zones. Pillow lavas and hyaloclastite cover its slopes, and parasitic vents can be observed as well. The volcano has a volume of about 310 cubic kilometres (74 cu mi) and has a width of 19 kilometres (12 mi) at its foot. Bounty has erupted rocks with compositions of alkali basalt, trachyandesite and trachyte.

== Eruption history ==
Bounty Seamount was formed in several stages, and it could have developed over a time of 58,000 years. Alkali basalts from Bounty have been dated by potassium-argon dating to be 344,000 ± 32,000 years before present. Nevertheless, traces of recent volcanic activity and of hydrothermal venting have been found.

This hydrothermal venting manifests itself by the release of low-temperature fluids and the formation of iron-rich crusts. Temperatures of vented fluids amount to 14–19 °C (57–66 °F).
