= Vlinder Guyot =

Seamount in the Pacific Ocean

Location
- Coordinates: 17°00′N 154°15′E

Vlinder Guyot (also known as Alba Seamount) is a guyot in the Western Pacific Ocean. It rises to a depth of 1,500 metres (4,900 ft) and has a flat top covering an area of 40 by 50 kilometres (25 mi × 31 mi). On top of this flat top lie some volcanic cones, one of which rises to a depth of 551 metres (1,808 ft) below sea level. Vlinder Guyot has noticeable rift zones, including an older and lower volcano to the northwest and Oma Vlinder seamount south.

Vlinder Guyot formed about 95 million years ago, presumably as a consequence of hotspot volcanism. The volcanic island became an atoll with active reefs that eventually drowned in the Albian-Cenomanian, although renewed volcanic activity until the Miocene sometimes sustained shallow water environments. The guyot is currently settled by numerous types of animals and is part of an area leased for mining purposes.

== Name ==
The seamount is officially known as Alba Guyot, after Francisco Alba, companion of Ferdinand Magellan. Other names are Dalmorgeo, MAGL-3, MA-15, or Vlinder.

== Geography and geomorphology ==
=== Regional ===
The Western Pacific Ocean contains a large number of mountains, including underwater guyots and emergent atolls and volcanic islands, all of which appear to originate from volcanic processes and formed on an uneven seafloor. The guyot lies between Guam and Wake Island and is part of the northwestern Magellan Seamounts. The Magellan Seamounts extend between the Mariana Trench and the Caroline and Marshall Islands, and include Pako Guyot, Ioah Guyot and Ita Mai Tai. These seamounts were formed either by hotspot volcanism – most likely, along with Pako and Ioah, by the Rarotonga or Samoa hotspots - or the activity of large-scale tectonic lineaments in the crust. the Vlinder Guyot lies close to the Ogasawara fracture zone and this fracture zone may have influenced the development of the guyot.

=== Local ===
Vlinder Guyot rises 3.5 kilometres (2.2 mi) to a mean depth of 1,500 metres (4,900 ft) and its flat top has dimensions of 40 by 50 kilometres (25 mi × 31 mi) with a trapezoid shape and sometimes a cover consisting of volcanic rocks and pelagic ooze. A post-erosional cone lies on the summit platform of Vlinder Guyot and rises about 0.5 kilometres (0.31 mi) above it. The northern rim of the summit platform is cut by a 10.7 by 4.8 kilometres (6.6 mi × 3.0 mi) notch that appear to have formed through a mass failure; similar mass failures have been observed on Kilauea and Piton de la Fournaise in Hawaii and Reunion respectively and in the case of Vlinder Guyot has involved over 10 cubic kilometres (2.4 cu mi) of rocks, which are now deposited over 6 kilometres (3.7 mi) away from the collapse scar. The pedestal of the seamount lies at a depth of 5,100 metres (16,700 ft) and covers an area of 90 by 126 kilometres (56 mi × 78 mi). A group of five volcanic cones, with widths of 5 kilometres (3.1 mi) and heights of 750 metres (2,460 ft), surmounts the guyot. The cones, which are possibly of Miocene age, reach a depth of 551 metres (1,808 ft), making Vlinder Guyot the shallowest among the Magellan Seamounts. The volcanic cones form an irregular group of cones in the northeastern corner of the summit platform and they feature reefal deposits. The slopes of Vlinder Guyot feature benches and terraces as well as rectilinear grabens; one such graben coincides with the young cones.

Coinciding with the corners of the trapezoid are northeastern, south-southeastern, southwestern and north-northwestern protrusions that appear to be rift zones and have lengths of 15–50 kilometres (9.3–31.1 mi). The two eastern protrusions feature additional seamounts, especially the south-southeastern one where Oma Vlinder seamount lies. Oma Vlinder rises to a depth of 1,520 metres (4,990 ft). A more diffuse volcanic centre lies on the northwestern extension and has three rift zones as well that are covered with volcanic cones up to 400 metres (1,300 ft) high and 9 kilometres (5.6 mi) wide. This centre appears to be older and apparently never rose above sea level, it is now located about 1,750 metres (5,740 ft) deeper.

The seafloor under Vlinder is 155-190 million years old. Remotely operated vehicle observations have found that the slopes of Vlinder Guyot are covered by sand and rocks. The sand is probably derived from pelagic sediments and also from the summit platform, while the rocks appear to be of both sedimentary and volcanic origin and are often covered by manganese crusts.

=== Composition ===
Vlinder Guyot has erupted alkali basalt, basanite and hawaiite containing hornblende and plagioclase, oceanite, tholeiite and trachybasalt, while Oma Vlinder has erupted hawaiite. The rocks are undersatured in silica, and isotope data show some affinity to rocks recovered at Pitcairn and Rarotonga. Other materials encountered include pelagic chalks, ferromanganese crusts up to 12.2 centimetres (4.8 in) thick, hyaloclastite, limestone of foraminiferal and reefal origin, mud, phosphorite, turbidites, volcaniclastic rocks lithified clays, gravelstones, sandstone, siltstone and tuffites.

Presumably, tholeiites form the base of the seamount and alkaline-subalkaline rocks its summit, while basanites occur in the secondary cones. There is evidence that fractional crystallization processes influenced the composition of Vlinder's rocks. Meanwhile, sediments such as limestone and silt and ferromanganese crusts cover the summit plateau. Weathering of volcanic rocks has produced iddingsite and palagonite, with calcite, chlorite and phillipsite.

=== Geologic history ===
Based on argon-argon dating, the northwestern edifice appears to be 102.4 – 100.2 million years old while the various dates obtained on samples from Vlinder and Oma Vlinder cluster around 95.1 ± 0.5 million years ago. Oma Vlinder and the main Vlinder Guyot appear to have the same ages and drowned at the same time, while the post-erosional cone is about 20-30 million years younger than Vlinder. The northwestern volcanic centre is too old to have been formed by the Magellan hotspot, while the post-erosional cone may relate to the Samoa hotspot that passed close to Vlinder Guyot between 75 – 65 million years ago or to plate tectonic processes. Miocene volcanic rocks have been found as well, and Cretaceous clays have been reported.

During the Aptian to Turonian, limestone deposits formed on Vlinder Guyot which are recognizable on the rift zones, Oma Vlinder and in parts of the main guyot. These limestones formed in lagoon and reef environments and contain fossils of bivalves, bryozoans, corals, echinoderms, foraminifera, gastropods, molluscs and rudists; rudists and corals were among the most important reef builders when at the time Vlinder Guyot was an atoll. Its drowning commenced in the Albian to Cenomanian times although evidence of continued emergence exists until the Paleocene; shallow areas may have been formed by late-stage volcanic eruptions that formed new cones on the flat top; they may have been emplaced on reefs and above sea level. The youngest volcanic rocks are 15 ± 2 million years old.

== Present-day ecosystem ==
The slopes of Vlinder Guyot are settled by bamboo corals, brittle stars, few coral colonies, feather stars, fish, glass sponges, octocorals, sea cucumbers, sea lilies, sea stars, shrimp and squat lobsters. Animals are particularly common in the more rocky areas. Among fish, cusk eels and cutthroat eels have been found.

== Human exploitation ==
The guyot is located within the area of the Pacific Islands Heritage Marine National Monument but also within an area leased to the Russian Federation by the International Seabed Authority for cobalt-rich ferromanganese exploration. The guyot has been researched for potential impacts of mining on its ecosystem.
