= Ioah Guyot =

Seamount in the Pacific Ocean

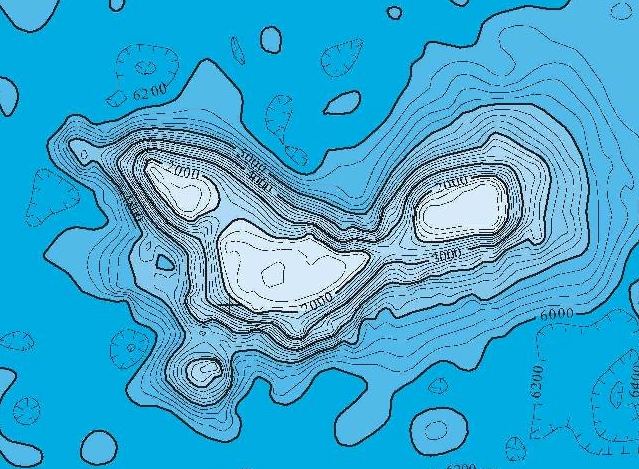

Location in the Pacific Ocean

Ioah Guyot is a seamount in the Pacific Ocean, close to the Marshall Islands. Part of the Magellan Seamounts, it is a shield volcano that has erupted alkali basalt and hawaiite 87 million years ago, but may have continued erupting into the Miocene. During the Cretaceous, reefs developed on the guyot.

== Geography and geomorphology ==
The guyot belongs to the Magellan Seamounts which stretch from the Mariana Trench to Ita Mai Tai seamount. It is also known as Fedorov and Ioan/ IOAN, which stands for "Institute of Oceanology of the Academy of Sciences of the USSR". Ita Mai Tai guyot lies south-southeast of Ioah and Pallada guyot north-northwest, other seamounts in the area east of Ioah are Changpogo, Gramberg, Zatonskii and Arirang. There are about 1000 seamounts in the central western Pacific.

Ioah Guyot is a shield volcano with an arcuate shape; the two halves that make it up have dimensions of 110 by 66 kilometres (68 mi × 41 mi) and 83 by 65 kilometres (52 mi × 40 mi). The guyot rises 4.5 kilometres (2.8 mi) from the seafloor to 1,420 metres (4,660 ft)–1,380 metres (4,530 ft) depth, forming a summit plateau with a surface area of 1,380 square kilometres (530 sq mi) that is covered by 25–75-metre (82–246 ft) high hills. The rim of the summit plateau is formed by volcanic rocks on the eastern part of the seamount and by reefal limestones on the western; the reef deposits form a sometimes 5 kilometres (3.1 mi) wide and in total about 200 kilometres (120 mi) long ring around the summit platform of Ioah Guyot and cover an area of about 315 square kilometres (122 sq mi), making it the largest limestone outcrop of the Magellan Seamounts. The lower slopes are gentle but steepen between 1,700–2,000-metre (5,600–6,600 ft) depth. Only the lower slopes are covered with thick sediment layers; the upper slopes have sediment accumulations only in sheltered areas and also feature step-like structures. A number of volcanic cones grew on Ioah and form morphostructures, with a density of about 11.1 vents per 1,000 square kilometres (390 sq mi). Some of these vents form alignments and Ioah lies at the intersection of two strike-slip faults. The seamount rises from the East Mariana Basin over Jurassic seafloor, between the two Ogasawara fracture zones.

=== Composition ===
Volcanic rocks found on Ioah Guyot include alkali basalt, tholeiite and hawaiite, plus ankaramite, phonolite and trachybasalt; as well as zeolites formed by hydrothermal processes. Breccia and sandstones cover the exposed rocks and formed through the breakup of basaltic rocks. Reef limestones and other carbonates were emplaced on the seamount, followed during the Eocene-Pleistocene by pelagic sediments. Clay deposits on the slopes and turbidites have also been reported.

Ferromanganese crusts on the seamount contain apatite, asbolane, buserite, calcite, clay, feldspar, ferrihydrite, feroxyhyte, goethite, hematite, quartz and todorokite and reach thicknesses of 10 centimetres (3.9 in), although they only cover small sectors of Ioah Guyot. Phosphate-containing minerals were deposited over time on Ioah; presently the guyot contains about 150,000,000–200,000,000 tonnes (150,000,000–200,000,000 long tons; 170,000,000–220,000,000 short tons) of phosphorite ore. Some of these ferromanganese deposits form nodules encased within limestones. Spherules of cosmic origin have been found.

== History ==
The seamount developed about 87 million years ago on the Pacific plate and is now extinct; its estimated age is placed in a range between 88.5 and 86.2 million years. It was located in the Southern Hemisphere as it formed. Some secondary volcanic cones may be much younger, of Miocene age. The formation of Ioah and the other Magellan Seamounts has been explained by a hotspot that would now be located close to the Rarotonga hotspot, Samoa hotspot and Society hotspot were it still active. Compositionally, volcanic rocks from Ioah resemble these of the Rarotonga hotspot.

During the Aptian-Cenomanian, limestones and volcanic rocks formed sediments on Ioah Guyot which developed a reef system. A secondary reefal phase occurred during Santonian to Maastrichtian times and a third one during the Eocene. Ioah developed the largest reefs of the Magellan Seamounts, with coral material accumulating to thicknesses of 200–300 metres (660–980 ft). During the Eocene, tuffs were emplaced on the seamount. Ferromanganese crusts developed later during the Paleogene and Miocene-Pleistocene, and up to 150 metres (490 ft) sediments accumulated on the summit plateau.

== Biology ==
Species that lived on Ioah Guyot during the Cretaceous include ammonoids, belemnites, bivalves, bryozoans, cephalopods, corals, crinoids, foraminifera, gastropods, rudists, sea pens, sea urchins and sponges. Presently, a rich fauna has been identified on Ioah Guyot, including scleractinian corals without zooxanthelles such as Fungiacyathus pliciseptus and Peponocyathus australiensis which is usually found in much shallower waters.

== See also ==
- Pako Guyot
- Vlinder Guyot
