= Pasco banks =

Long ridge-like seamount in the south Pacific

Pacso Seamount

Location
- Coordinates: 13.083333°S 174.416667°W

The Pasco Banks (also known as Pasco Seamount) refers to a naturally occurring geological and marine formation in the south Pacific Ocean. The Pasco Banks is a long ridge-like seamount that rises from about 200 m to within 30 m of the ocean's surface. Covered in patchy coral reef, it attracts large schools of baitfish, mainly rainbow runner, which in turn are preyed upon by larger predatory fishes. This abundance of fish has made the Pasco Banks a popular and reliable fishing location for hundreds of years.

== Location ==
The Pasco Banks seamount formation is located 13° 05' 00" S latitude and 174° 25' 00" W longitude in the South Pacific Ocean, roughly halfway between the Polynesian islands of Samoa and Uvea. The seamount that includes the Pasco Banks is part of the Samoan volcanic chain which extends from Tuvalu, Uvea, and Futuna eastward to the submarine volcano Vailulu'u east of the Manu'a islands of American Samoa. While the Samoan volcanic chain results from the plume-driven tectonic Samoa hotspot, not unlike the hotspot responsible for the formation of the Hawaiian Islands, a definite geological assignment

== Discovery and Prehistoric Fishing ==
Seafaring Austronesians, perhaps Lapita or proto-Polynesian migrants, were the first humans to discover and utilize the Pasco Banks. In pre-colonial times, Samoan master fishermen ("tautai" in the Samoan language) routinely led fleets of double-hulled voyaging canoes to the Pasco Banks for fishing expeditions. Smaller canoes used for trolling were transported on the decks of the larger double-hulled canoes. These expeditions of more than 80 miles of open sea to an entirely submerged reef attest to the maritime expertise of Oceanian navigators in developing the practical skill and scientific knowledge of Polynesian navigation. Samoan fishermen trolled for the same predatory fish as modern sport fishermen, including "atu" (skipjack tuna), "asiasi" (yellowfin tuna), "paala" (wahoo), "tagi" (dogtooth tuna), and "sa'ula" (marlin). Samoan fishermen also used scoop nets to harvest from the multitudes of baitfish at the Pasco Banks, especially "samani" (rainbow runner).

== Historical Fishing ==
While Polynesians once fished the Pasco Banks regularly, the area is largely devoid of commercial fishing ventures today. The Samoan Fisheries Department reports several fishing ventures at the Pasco Banks beginning in 1979 but the remote location and concerns about profitability and sustainability resulted in most projects being cancelled by 1985.

== Modern Sport Fishing ==
Fishing expeditions to the Pasco Banks are often arranged through private chartered outfits based in Samoa and Vanuatu. The most abundant catches are reported to be Dogtooth tuna, wahoo, skipjack tuna, marlin, yellowfin tuna and sailfish.
