= Magellan Seamounts =

Seamount chain in Pacific Ocean

Location
- Location: Pacific Ocean

Geology
- Type: Seamount chain
- Age of rock: 121–20 Ma

The Magellan Seamounts (also known as Magellan Seamount Group and previously called Magellan Rise) stretch from the Mariana Trench to Ita Mai Tai Guyot. Geological studies have demonstrated unique features with implications on understanding of ocean island basalt volcanism. Contracts exist with the International Seabed Authority to exploit the areas potential mineral wealth.

== Geography ==
The Magellan Seamounts extend from 11.0°N 151.0°E to 18.0°N 157.0°E

They include:

1. Govorov Guyot
  - 18°00.25′N 151°13.50′E
  - 121 ± 2.8 to 98.5 ± 1.4 Ma
2. Ioah Seamount (also known as Ioah Guyot, Ioan Seamount or Fedorov Seamount)
  - 14°06.00′N 156°08.40′E
  - 87 million years old
3. Pako Guyot
  - 15°42.83′N 155°11.96′E
  - 92 million years old but volcanics have been now dated in range 112 to 86 Ma and < 20 Ma in smaller volcanoes on the guyot.
4. Vlinder Guyot (also known as Alba Guyot)
  - 16°57.61′N 154°16.63′E
  - 95 million years old
5. Ita Mai Tai Guyot
  - 12°51.00′N 156°46.20′E
  - 118 million years old

=== Geology ===
The volcanoes are part of a hotspot chain whose formation ages are in the range 121 to 86 million years ago. However recently sampling has shown secondary volcanic activity at about 20 million years ago. Pako Guyot, which is quite large, is to date the only ocean island basalt seamount where two quite distinct mantle plume components have been discovered in one seamount, being an extreme high μ = ^{238}U/^{204}Pb mantle (HIMU) and enriched mantle 1 (EM1) component. These are respectively suggestive of associations with the Arago hotspot and/or the Rarotonga hotspot and make a previously suggested association with the Samoa hotspot less likely. Given their age the guyots have also had sedimentary deposits which have been characterised as reef and planktonic limestones. They are of interest for their mineral potential, for example with cobalt containing ferromanganese nodule deposits.

== See also ==
- Geology of the Pacific Ocean
