= Vailuluʻu =

Volcanic seamount in the Samoa Islands

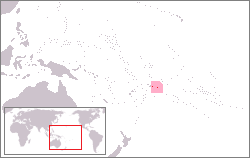
- Location of American Samoa
- Summit depth: 590 metres (1,940 ft)
- Height: 4,200 m (13,800 ft)

Location
- Location: South Pacific Ocean
- Coordinates: 14°12′54″S 169°3′30″W
- Country: United States

Geology
- Last eruption: 2003

History
- Discovery date: 1975

Location in the Pacific Ocean

Vailuluʻu is a volcanic seamount discovered in 1975. It rises from the sea floor to a depth of 593 m (1,946 ft) and is located between Taʻu and Rose islands at the eastern end of the Samoa hotspot chain. The basaltic seamount is considered to mark the current location of the Samoa hotspot. The summit of Vailuluʻu contains a 2 km wide, 400 m deep oval-shaped caldera. Two principal rift zones extend east and west from the summit, parallel to the trend of the Samoan hotspot. A third less prominent rift extends southeast of the summit.

Eruptions at Vailuluʻu were recorded in 1973. An earthquake swarm in 1995 may have been related to an eruption from the seamount. Turbid water above the summit shows evidence of ongoing hydrothermal plume activity. Vailuluʻu may breach the surface of the ocean and officially become an island if a high rate of eruptions continue.

== Name and research history ==
The seamount was first discovered in 1975 after seismic activity, including earthquakes, was noted in the area and was originally known as either Rockne Volcano or Faʻafafine seamount. The name Vailuluʻu refers to a sacred rain that supposedly fell with every gathering for the Tui Manuʻa, the paramount chief of the Manuʻa Islands. It was coined by the American Samoa student Taulealo Vaofusi, the winner of a naming competition, and assigned in 2000. The Nafanua cone is named after a Samoan war goddess, Nafanua. Today the seamount is part of the National Marine Sanctuary of American Samoa.

== Geography and geomorphology ==
Vailuluʻu is located east of American Samoa; the easternmost island Taʻu is located 43 kilometres (27 mi) west of Vailuluʻu. Even farther west lie Ofu-Olosega and Muli, while Malumalu Seamount is located south of Ofu-Olosega. Rose Atoll and Malulu Seamount are located southeast from Vailuluʻu.

Vailuluʻu is a conical seamount and reaches a depth of 593 metres (1,946 ft) and features a 2 kilometres (1.2 mi) wide and 0.4 kilometres (0.25 mi) deep crater; the shallowest part of the seamount is located on the western crater rim which has a scalloped appearance. Two additional summits and three breaches can be found in the crater rim; the deepest breach lies in the southeast and is 795 metres (2,608 ft) deep.

The seamount has a star-like shape, with two prominent ridges east and west and a somewhat less prominent ridge south of the volcano; it also features smaller ridges at its foot and amphitheatre-shaped scars from landslides. The total volume of the volcano is estimated to be about 1,050 cubic kilometres (250 cu mi) and its height above the seafloor is comparable with that of major isolated volcanoes such as Fuji, although much smaller than compound volcanic islands such as Hawaii. The seafloor around Vailuluʻu lies at a depth of about 5 kilometres (3.1 mi); the foot of the seamount has a diameter of about 35 kilometres (22 mi). A saddle at a depth of 3,200 metres (10,500 ft) depth connects it to Taʻu.

A 300 metres (980 ft) high cone in the crater bears the name Nafanua, and formed in 2004 in the western half of the crater. Prior to the formation of the cone, the crater contained several pit craters; it is possible that the crater was once occupied by a higher cone, which might have risen to shallow depths. The Nafanua cone consists mostly of pillow lavas.

=== Hydrothermal vents ===
Hydrothermal vents are found at a number of sites within the crater with varied characteristics, including high and low temperature vents. The bulk of the venting occurs through the a complex known as the Northern Moat Hydrothermal Complex and reaches temperatures of 80 °C (176 °F), while another complex, called the South Wall Fe Chimney, vents water with temperatures of 20 °C (68 °F) in massive vents. The hydrothermal activity influences the waters within the crater, making them turbid and warmer than the water in the free ocean. Low temperature hydrothermal vents are found on the western ridge of Vailuluʻu as well.

The hydrothermal fluids vented at the Northern Moat Hydrothermal Complex appear to be rich in sulfides, and droplets of carbon dioxide have been observed in the vented fluids. Particles emitted by the vents in some places reduce visibility underwater to less than 2 metres (6 ft 7 in), and the vented fluids are subject to complicated buoyancy, ocean current and mixing processes once they enter the seawater.

The total flow is estimated at 0.13 cubic kilometres per day (1,500 m^{3}/s). The total power of the hydrothermal system is estimated to be 610-760 megawatts and it forms substantial hydrothermal plumes in the crater; the altered water extends some distance from the volcano.

== Geology ==
Vailuluʻu lies at the eastern end of the Samoan volcanic chain and is considered to be the present-day location of the Samoa hotspot; this interpretation is based on both the position of the seamount and the isotope ratios of rocks taken from it. Young rock ages have also been observed on Malumalu Seamount, implying that the hotspot is currently feeding both volcanoes and forming two separate volcanic chains. These two volcanoes are the endpoints of two separate volcano lineaments in the Samoa islands.

Samoa is located just northeast of the northern corner of the Tonga Trench, where the Pacific Plate is subducting. This proximity to the trench is probably the reason why the older volcanic islands all display recent volcanic activity, such as activity from 1905 to 1911 on Savaii and originally led to proposals of a non-hotspot origin of the Samoa islands. However, the islands' formation shows an eastward trend and evidence of age progression, which has been interpreted as reflecting an age progressive chain of volcanoes that begins at Vailuluʻu and at Malumalu Seamount. The Malulu Seamount and Rose Island east of Vailuluʻu do not appear related to the Samoa hotspot system,. On the other side of the volcanic chain are the seamounts Lalla Rookh Bank, Combe Bank and Alexa Bank which are older products of the Samoa hotspot.

The origin of the Samoan volcanic chain has been explained with either a hotspot influenced by the Tonga Trench or by cracking of the Pacific crust; today the preferred theory is that the Samoan chain is a hotspot-generated volcanic chain while the "anomalous" younger volcanism is produced through an interaction between the islands and the Tonga Trench and a neighboring transform fault. This hotspot is under the influence of the mantle flows triggered by the Tonga Trench, which distort the rising plume and also changes its upwelling flux. This interaction has only begun recently.

=== Composition ===
Alkali basalts and picrites have been dredged from the volcano. The volcanic rocks on Vailuluʻu reflect a magma suite called "end-member magma type 2" (EM2) although there are noticeable differences between the geochemistries of various volcanic units at Vailuluʻu.

Evidence of hydrothermal alteration includes quartz in rock samples. Iron oxide chimneys with sizes measured in centimetres to metres have been formed by low temperature hydrothermal venting. A total mass flux of 5.5 tonnes per day (0.063 long ton/ks) of manganese has been estimated. Hydrothermal sulfide and oxide deposits may become targets for mining.

== Biology ==
Various bacteria live on Vailuluʻu, including in microbial mats on basalts, which are related to bacteria from Tangaroa Seamount in the Kermadec Ridge, Kamaʻehuakanaloa Seamount in Hawaii and in the East Pacific Rise. A number of mostly pigmented yeasts and other fungi have been identified in deposits from the Nafanua Cone and in iron mats and might play important roles in the ecosystems of Vailuluʻu.

Microbial mats with thicknesses of 2–4 centimetres (0.79–1.57 in) (though possibly thicker in depressions) have been found at Vailuluʻu; they often contain iron hydroxide/iron oxide deposits. The widespread production of siderophores by microorganisms may not only serve to make iron available to them but also to reduce the trapping of the organisms within iron oxides.

Sulfur, manganese and iron may serve as electron donors in organism metabolism at Vailuluʻu; hydrogen sulfide, iron, manganese and methane-oxidizing Gammaproteobacteria have been encountered.

Demosponges have been observed in breaches of the crater rim and presumably rely on incoming nutrient-rich water from the ocean, while crinoids, gorgonians, ophiuroids and sponges have been found on the western rift zone of Vailuluʻu. In non-hydrothermal areas, echinoderms, octocorals and sponges dominate the surfaces, and crabs, eels, octocorals and octopuses have been observed in the summit areas. Other animals include sea anemones and hydroids on older rocks. The eel populations have given that part of the volcano the nickname "Eel City"; the eels subsist on food species transported by ocean currents, such as crustaceans.

There are differences between the animal fauna in various parts of the volcano. For example, the oxygenated waters and availability of shrimp as food source attract eels to the summit of Nafanua, while the crater floor displays a high animal mortality and is called the "moat of death"; polychaetes feeding on dead fish have been found on the crater floor. This is due to the very low availability of oxygen for respiration at the crater floor, unlike at the summit of Nafanua cone.

== Eruption history ==
Vailuluʻu is an active volcano, with earthquakes, volcanic eruptions and hydrothermal activity recorded. In particular, the seamount is a site with common earthquakes in this otherwise mostly aseismic part of the Pacific Plate and away from the earthquakes of the Tonga Trench, recording an average 4 earthquakes per day. Seismic swarms were observed in 1973 and 1995; an earthquake swarm took place in 2000. The hypocentres of these earthquakes appear to coincide with the hydrothermal areas and the earthquakes correlate with the southeastern ridge, which is a rift zone.

Disequilibria in thorium and uranium isotopes of rock samples taken from the seamount indicate that Vailuluʻu was frequently active in the last 8,000 years and that eruptions within the summit crater took place in the last hundred years. Dredge samples showed fresh rocks; radiometric dating produced ages of less than ten years according to 1984 and 1999 publications.

The seismic swarm in 1973 appears to have been a major submarine eruption. The last eruption, between 2001 and 2004, went unobserved and formed the Nafanua volcanic cone; for the most part, the shape of the volcano has not changed over time. Repeated eruptions like the one that formed Nafanua could cause Vailuluʻu to emerge from the sea. The summit of Vailuluʻu is shallow enough that explosive eruptions may occur which can affect coastal communities and ships. It appears that isostatic effects from the growth of the seamount may have altered shorelines on Tutuila.

== Gallery ==
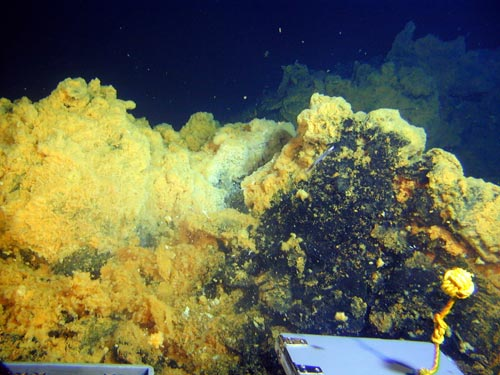
The summit of Nafanua is covered with thick microbial mats, indicative of low-temperature venting

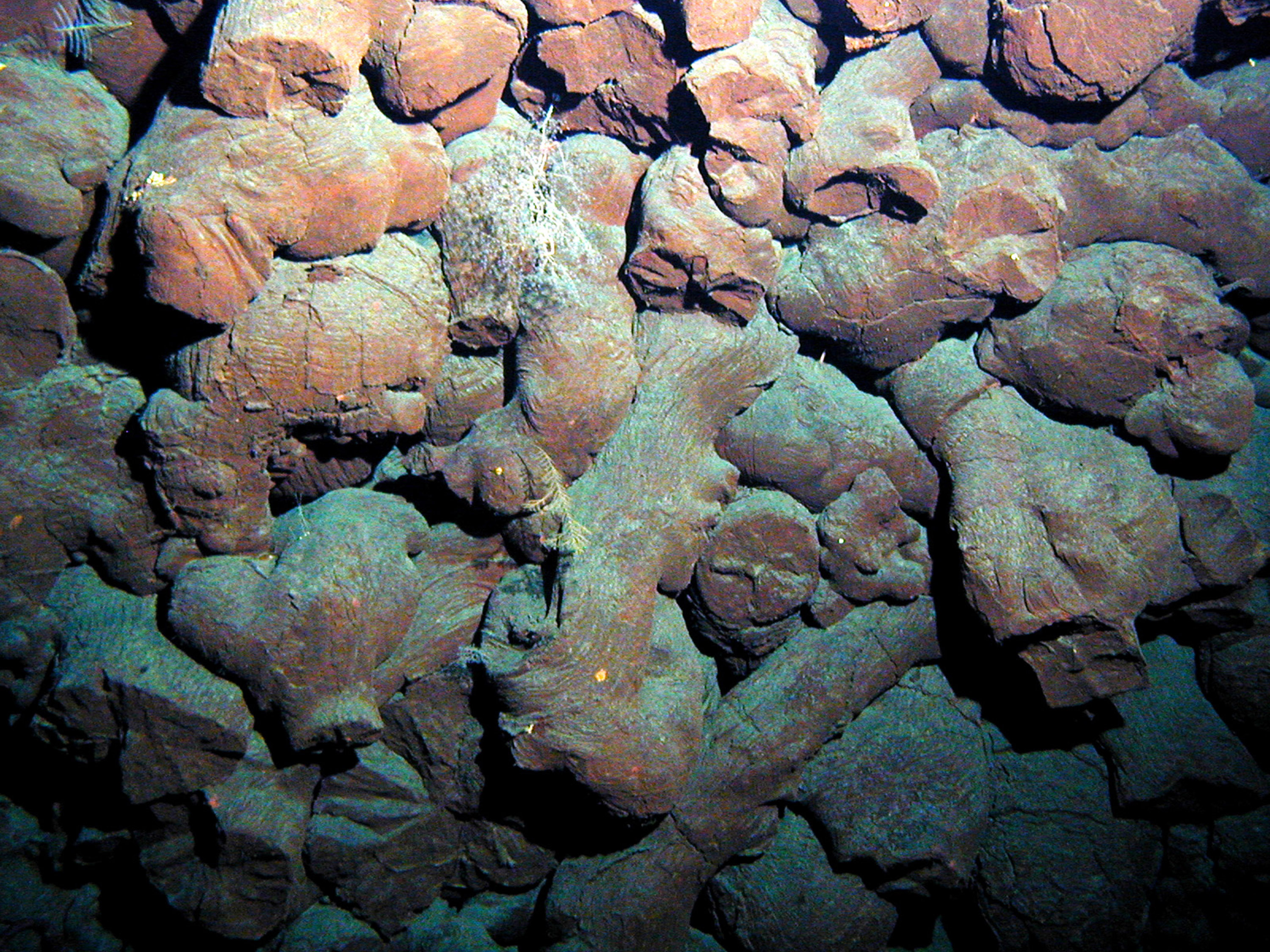
Broken pillow lavas, colored red by iron oxide, inside Vailuluʻu crater.

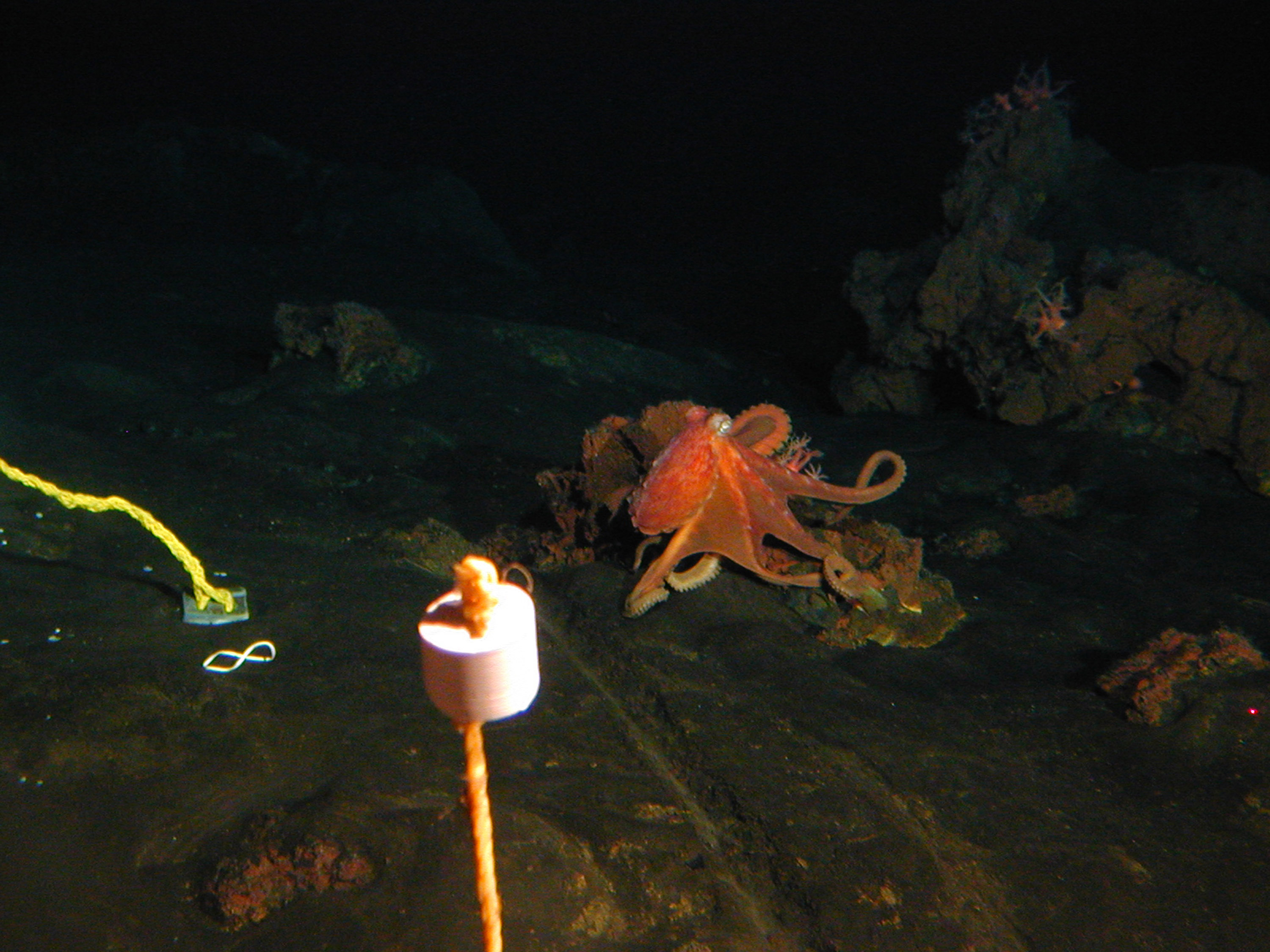
An octopus living on the western summit of Vailulʻu

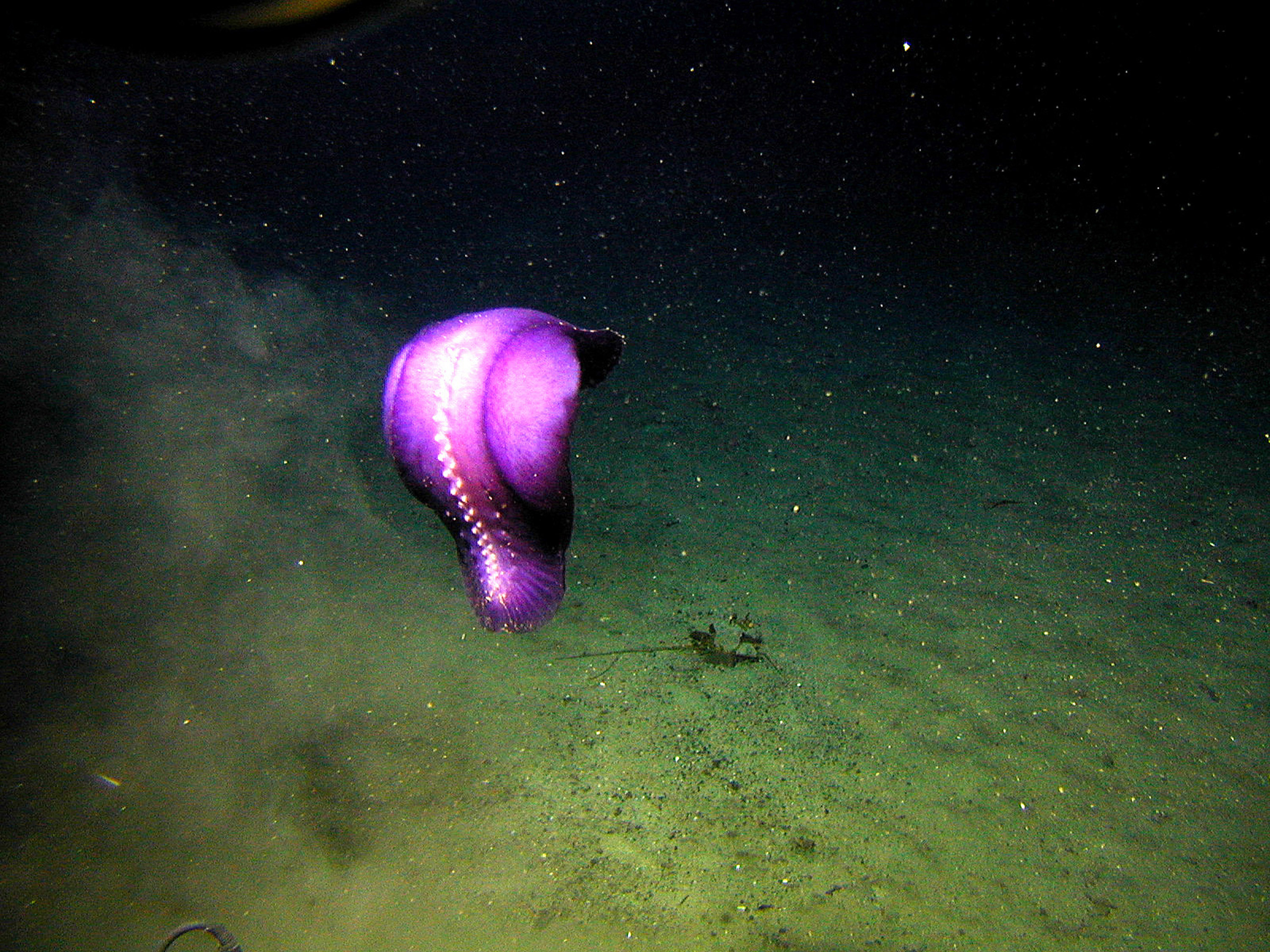
Swimming elasipod sea cucumber, Paleopatides sp., photographed off the northern shore of Tau Island, Vailuluʻu Expedition 2005
