= Malumalu =

Seamount in American Samoa

Location
- Coordinates: 14°36′29″S 169°47′06″W

Malumalu (also known as Malu Malu, Malumalu Seamount), is a volcanic seamount in American Samoa. Together with Savaii, Upolu and Tutuila, it forms a topographic structure close to the Tonga Trench, which lies about 100 kilometres (62 mi) south. Malumalu lies about 66 kilometres (41 mi) south of Ofu island and is also known as "Southeast Bank". It is about 25 kilometres (16 mi) wide at its base and is part of the Mula ridge, which extends to Tutuila.

The seamount is a young volcano at the eastern end of a lineament that begins on Tutuila. This lineament has been named the "Malu trend" (in contrast to the "Vai trend" farther northeast, which runs between Ofu, Ta'u and Vailulu'u). This is comparable to the "Kea" and "Loa" trends in Hawaii. Malumalu is not much older than Vailulu'u, which has erupted in historical time. Actinide isotope ratios indicate the occurrence of at least three volcanic events in the last 300,000 years, including at least two in the last 150,000 years and at least one in the last 8,000 years, and is thus classified as potentially active during the Holocene. According to one model of the behaviour of the Samoa hotspot, volcanic activity at Malumalu will decline in the next 10,000 - 100,000 years as the mantle plume is pushed farther northeast to Vailulu'u by mantle flow generated by the Tonga slab.
