= Pako Guyot =

Guyot in the Pacific Ocean

Coordinates: 15°30′N 155°0′E

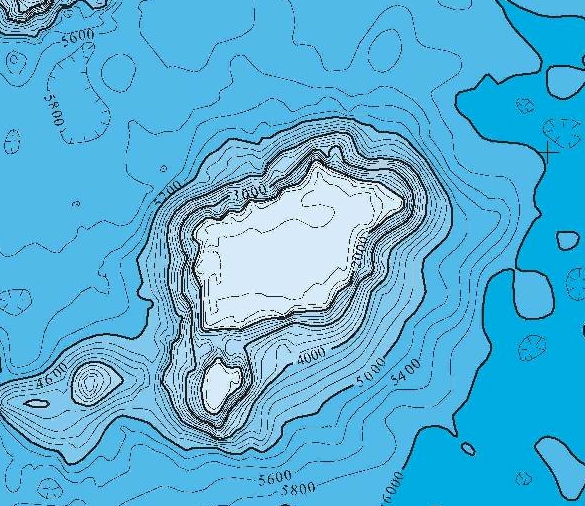
Bathymetry

Pako Guyot is a guyot in the Pacific Ocean.

== Name ==
The guyot is also known as Caiwei or Pallada after the Russian frigate Pallada.

== Geomorphology ==
Pako Guyot reaches a depth of 1,350 metres (4,430 ft). It has dimensions of 40 by 65 kilometres (25 mi × 40 mi) and features a summit plateau 2,056 square kilometres (794 sq mi) wide at a depth of 1,500–1,650 metres (4,920–5,410 ft) with a shape corresponding to an irregular rectangle-triangle. With an area of 13,680 square kilometres (5,280 sq mi), Pako Guyot is the third-largest guyot on Earth, only behind Koko Seamount and Suiko Seamount. The summit plateau is covered by sediments 25–100 metres (82–328 ft) thick including foraminiferal ooze, while the flanks feature small-scale features such as depressions, ridges and trenches. Former reefs occur on the seamount and during the Cretaceous and Eocene left mudstones and limestones on the seamount. Later, pelagic limestones were emplaced on them. A 65 square kilometres (25 sq mi) large area on the northwestern corner of Pako Guyot's summit plateau is free of sediments.

== Geology ==
The guyot is part of the Magellan Seamounts. The seamount was volcanically active during the Cretaceous-Paleogene 91.3 million years ago and may have formed on a hotspot together with Ioah Guyot and Vlinder Guyot; a late phase of volcanism may have taken place in the Paleocene-Eocene. The hotspots that formed Pako Guyot were located in what is today French Polynesia.

Volcanic rocks dredged from Pako are of sodium-potassium hawaiitic and trachybasaltic composition and geochemically resemble these erupted by the Rarotonga hotspot. Clays with Cenomanian-age radiolarian fossils cover the entire lower slopes of Pako Guyot.

== Biota ==
Corals and squat lobsters have been found on the seamount. Ophiuroids, most of which are symbiotic with corals and sponges, live on the seamount and its flanks. Diverse communities including brittle stars, corals, fish, sea anemones, sea cucumbers, sea lilies, sea urchins, shrimp and starfish have been found at its feet, where organic matter accumulates. Ammonites lived on the seamount during the Cretaceous.

== Mining ==
The seamount features substantial deposits of ferromanganese and phosphorite ores. In 2014, China obtained a contract with the International Seabed Authority allowing for exploration of Pako Guyot for cobalt crusts.

== See also ==
- Ita Mai Tai
