= Ita Mai Tai =

Seamount in the Pacific Ocean

Coordinates: 12.9°N 156.9°E

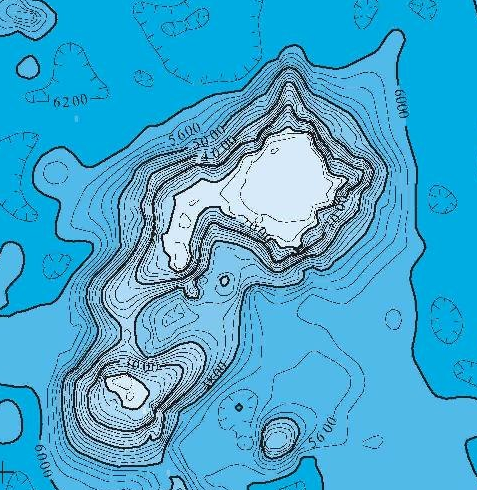
Bathymetry of Ita Mai Tai Guyot. The smaller guyot in the lower left corner is Gelendzhik Guyot.

Ita Mai Tai is a Cretaceous-early Cenozoic seamount northwest of the Marshall Islands and north of Micronesia. One among a number of seamounts in the Pacific Ocean, it is part of the Magellan Seamounts which may have a hotspot origin although Ita Mai Tai itself may not have formed on a hotspot.

The seamount is formed by volcanic rocks which form two adjacent volcanic centres that erupted between the Aptian-Albian and possibly as late as the Pliocene. Reef systems developed on the seamount after its formation and led to the deposition of limestones. Especially during the Oligocene the seamount subsided and lies now at 1,402 metres (4,600 ft) depth below sea level. Ferromanganese crusts as well as pelagic oozes were deposited on the submerged rocks.

== Name and research history ==
The name Ita Mai Tai comes from the Tahitian language and means "no damn good". The name was coined by Bruce C. Heezen and is probably a reference to unsuccessful attempts to obtain drill cores during the early research history of the seamount. The seamount has also been named OSM1, Ita Matai and Weijia Guyot. The Deep Sea Drilling Project drill cores 202, 201 and 200 were taken at Ita Mai Tai, a drill site selection that was motivated in part by technical problems in the drilling equipment. In addition, in 2016 the submersible Jiaolong sampled the seamount. which was also visited during the 9th cruise of the RV Academician Mstislav Keldysh.

== Geography and geology ==
=== Regional ===
The Pacific Ocean seafloor is characterized by a striking contrast between the relatively flat floor of the Eastern Pacific and the Western Pacific whose seafloor is dotted by oceanic plateaus and seamounts. These structures may have formed on top of large Cretaceous uplift episodes, moving hotspots, mid-ocean ridges and transform faults.

Ita Mai Tai is considered to be part of the Magellan Seamounts, a chain of seamounts that extends northwest away from this seamount, and one of their best studied members. The activity of the Magellan Seamounts has been attributed to a hotspot in the South Pacific, but attributing Ita Mai Tai to such a hotspot is difficult as Ita Mai Tai appears to be too old in comparison to the other Magellan Seamounts to be a product of the same hotspot. The Rarotonga hotspot, Samoa hotspot and Society hotspot appear to coincide with the reconstructed location of the Magellan Seamounts hotspot; one of these may have formed the Magellan Seamounts.

=== Local ===
Ita Mai Tai is about 150 kilometres (93 mi) long, 100 kilometres (62 mi) wide and has a flat summit with a surface area of 650 square kilometres (250 sq mi)-1,459.7 square kilometres (563.6 sq mi), and a slope break at about 2,200 metres (7,200 ft) depth. Unconsolidated sediments cover the summit platform. There is evidence that the flat summit was a lagoon surrounded by a coral reef with limestone outcrops that reach 5 kilometres (3.1 mi) length, and the volcanic basement forms an uplift in the central section of the flat summit. Volcanic cones form swells on the western part of the summit plateau of Ita Mai Tai, and structures such as domes, ridges, scarps, steps and terraces are dispersed all over the seamount.

The seamount reaches a depth of 1,319 metres (4,327 ft) below sea level and rises about 4.6 kilometres (2.9 mi) above the seafloor. On the seafloor, it occupies a surface of 6,400 square kilometres (2,500 sq mi), making it much larger than other Pacific seamounts, and is surrounded by a shallow moat on the northern and southeastern side. The outer slopes of the seamount have a step-like appearance and feature radial grabens formed presumably by subsidence. At their foot, sediments descending from the seamount have formed talus deposits.

The seamount has several rift zones crosscut by dykes and sills and features an L-shaped ridge to the west with a width of 10–15 kilometres (6.2–9.3 mi). South of the L-shaped ridge lies another seamount which is also considered to be part of Ita Mai Tai; it is uneroded and features parasitic vents. The ridge that connects the two may be the western edge of a collapse caldera. This 13 kilometres (8.1 mi) wide and 2,525 metres (8,284 ft) deep southern seamount is also known as Gelendzhik Seamount after a research ship of the same name and forms a volcano-tectonic massif with Ita Mai Tai; thus it consists of two separate volcanoes. Butakov Guyot may be the third partner of this complex.

The seamount lies on the eastern margin of the Mariana Basin. The lack of magnetic lineations on the seafloor surrounding Ita Mai Tai makes it difficult to tell how old the ocean crust is. However, during the Aptian neighbouring volcanic islands deposited volcanic rocks on the seafloor and the crust is now considered to be of Jurassic age. The Ogasawara fracture zone passes just north of Ita Mai Tai; seamounts in the neighbourhood are Butakov in the south, Arirang in the southeast, Zatonskii east, Gramberg northeast and Fedorov north-northwest.

=== Composition ===
Among the rocks found at Ita Mai Tai are alkali basalts, basalts, clays, hawaiites, limestone, muds, picrites, tholeiites, trachytes and trachybasalt; volcanic rocks contain potassium feldspar and plagioclase.

The volcanic rocks have been subdivided into a lower tholeiitic subunit and an upper more trachytic unit; there are also compositional differences between various parts of the seamount. Some of the volcanic rocks take the form of breccia, lava, tuffs and tuffites. The limestone takes the form of siltstone, sandstone, gravelstone and coquina. In drill cores of the summit region the limestone reaches a thickness of 35 metres (115 ft) and the mud of 45 metres (148 ft); the mud formed in lagoonal settings. Terrigenous rocks have also been encountered within the limestones.

Guyots such as Ita Mai Tai often accumulate ferromanganese crusts. These are generated by the oxidative precipitation of manganese salts which also include iron and absorb trace elements such as cobalt, copper, molybdenum, nickel, platinum, rare earth elements and zinc from the water through as-yet unknown processes. In the case of Ita Mai Tai these crusts have been found all over the seamount and sometimes reach thicknesses of over 20 centimetres (7.9 in), with geochemical differences between the various sectors of the seamount and between crusts of different ages (which trace Ita Mai Tai's tectonic movement across the Pacific Ocean). These ferromanganese crusts have aroused scientific interest in the seamount. Some evidence of hydrothermal alteration has been found in the form of barite deposits within the ferromanganese crusts.

== Geologic history ==
Ita Mai Tai erupted first during the Albian and Aptian periods. It originated in what today is the South Pacific but it can't be reliably linked to any particular hot spot. Another episode of volcanic activity may constitute late stage volcanism; it might be represented by Campanian volcaniclastic rocks, an Eocene dome and Pliocene cones on Gelendzhik seamount. such late volcanism has been observed in other neighbouring seamounts as well. An uplift episode took place during the Cretaceous. Radiometric dating has yielded ages of about 118-120 million years ago.

At least during the Paleocene, Ita Mai Tai emerged above sea level. From the Aptian to the Miocene, carbonates were deposited on the seamount and reached an eventual thickness of about 525 metres (1,722 ft). Additionally, the seamount has subsided by about 2,090 metres (6,860 ft), albeit with time periods where this subsidence was interrupted by the growth of coral reefs. Most of the subsidence occurred during the Oligocene when sedimentation rates were depressed, but the carbonate platform drowned no later than the Eocene, with oolithes forming underwater.

During three different episodes in the Aptian-Turonian, Santonian-Maastrichtian and Paleocene-Eocene, oolithic limestones were deposited on Ita Mai Tai, presumably by reefs and living organisms in shallow water. Lifeforms that inhabited the seamount included algae, belemnites, bivalves, bryozoans, corals, decapods, echinoderms, foraminifera, gastropods, ostracods, pogonophora, rudists and sea urchins; their fossils have been recovered in the limestone from Ita Mai Tai and the rudists are the most commonly encountered reef builders on this seamount. The oolith-containing limestone was formed by a coral reef. The reef was affected by wave activity and there were lagoonal environments as well. Bioherms developed on the Gelendzhik seamount as well, where cephalopods including belemnites have been found.

During the Eocene to Quaternary, foraminiferal ooze accumulated on the guyot at a rate of 6.7 millimetres per millennium (0.26 in/ka) but with occasional erosional periods which show up as hiatuses in the sedimentary record, the ooze also contains fish teeth and radiolarian fossils. However, tuffs of Eocene age have also been found. This sediment layer is unusually thick by the standard of other Pacific Ocean seamounts, its thickness reaching 150 metres (490 ft)-170 metres (560 ft).

== Ecological communities ==
Presently, scleractinian corals without zooxanthelles form "meadows" and "patches" on the surface of Ita Mai Tai. Other animals are cnidarians mainly as octocorals, corals, crustaceans, echinoderms including ophiuroids and crinoids, which dominate the animal community, fish, holothurians, porifers, and sponges as glass sponges. They are distributed over three typical environments; the first is dominated by sponges on hard substrates, the second by echinoderms also on hard substrates and the third are echinoids and shrimps mainly over soft substrates. The sponges benefit from ocean currents triggered by the seamount that supply nutrients. The verrucid barnacle Gibbosaverruca weijiai and deep sea sponge Spongicoloides weijiaensis were discovered near Ita Mai Taiand named after an alternative name of the seamount. Another species discovered there is the polychaete Ceuthonoe nezhai, which lives within sponges.

== Mining ==
Crusts containing iron and manganese with smaller quantities of cobalt, copper, molybdenum, nickel, platinum, rare earth elements, sulfur and zinc occur on Ita Mai Tai. Some of these outcrops in the summit region may be suitable for mining. In 2014, the International Seabed Authority granted a Chinese company a contract that allowed it to explore cobalt-rich crusts at seamounts in a sector of the Pacific Ocean including Ita Mai Tai.

== See also ==
- Pako Guyot
