= Alexa Bank =

Seamount in Samoa, northwest of Rotuma

- Location of the "Alexa Bank". Flanders Marine Institute.
- Summit depth: 18–21 metres

Location
- Location: Rotuma
- Group: Melanesian Border Plateau
- Coordinates: 11.5833°S 175.33°E
- Country: Samoa

Geology
- Type: Seamount
- Age of rock: 37-24 million years

Alexa Bank is a seamount in Samoa, northwest of Rotuma. The seamount reaches a depth of 18–21 metres (59–69 ft) below sea level and has the appearance of an atoll with a flat top and steep slopes. Some active coral growth takes place at its top, but if it ever was an active atoll it has now drowned. It was probably formed by the Samoa hotspot 24 million years ago, although older volcanism about 40 million years ago has also been identified.

== Geology and geomorphology ==
=== Local ===
Alexa Bank rises to depths of 18–21 metres (59–69 ft), has an eastward elongated flat top and is 150 kilometres (93 mi) long and 20–65 kilometres (12–40 mi) wide, widening towards the west; such dimensions resemble these of Savaii and Upolu in Samoa. The flat top has some features of an atoll including a raised rim, and it may indeed once have been an atoll. The rim is surrounded by a narrow terrace and in turn encloses a much wider terrace, that surrounds the flat top at an average depth of 42 metres (138 ft). The northern and southern flanks are formed by steep scarps, with the eastern slope featuring a terrace at 750 metres (2,460 ft) depth and the western slope extending as a 150 kilometres (93 mi) long volcanic ridge.

The upper 1,600–800 metres (5,200–2,600 ft) of the Bank are formed by carbonate sediments, while the eastern slope terrace may be part of the original volcanic edifice that was carried to this depth by thermal subsidence of the oceanic crust; seismic data may support the existence of a volcano within the carbonate sediments that form the bulk of Alexa Bank as well. Such thicknesses of the sediments are comparable to these of Bikini Atoll and Eniwetok.

=== Regional ===
The seafloor around Alexa Bank has a rough relief, with additional seamounts known as the Louisa Bank, Morton Bank, Penguin Bank and Turpie Bank nearby; the last two are often considered to be part of Alexa Bank. The 4,000 metres (13,000 ft) deep Alexa Trough lies west and south of Alexa Bank and is part of the Vitiaz Trench, connecting it with the Tonga Trench. The bank itself is part of the "Melanesian Border Plateau", a group of seamounts and islands along the Vitiaz Trench that are mostly of volcanic origin.

Alexa Bank appears to be the westernmost extension of the Samoa hotspot trail, which has covered a length of 1,700 kilometres (1,100 mi) at least. The hotspot trail is in part coincident with a large group of islands and seamounts which were probably formed by the same hotspot but also featured substantial postshield volcanism, probably owing to tectonic phenomena triggered by the Tonga Trench close by. The seafloor is part of the Pacific Plate.

=== Composition ===
Samples dredged from the Alexa Bank include basaltic rocks and have alkali basalt to tholeiitic composition. Isotope data display affinities to these from other Samoan volcanoes. Other rocks dredged from the seamount are argillite, breccia, shale and siltstone but they may not have originated on Alexa Bank proper.

== Geologic history ==
Rocks from Alexa Bank have been dated to be 37–36.9 million years old and may be a product of Eocene volcanism. More recent age estimates are 24 million years ago, while fossil data have been inferred to justify a Cretaceous age.

Alexa Bank has been considered to be a product of the Samoa hotspot, but its age may be too high to be a product of this hotspot. The newer age measurements however are consistent with the association with the Samoa hotspot. Some tectonic activity may have continued until later times, leading to the development of segmentation and tilting.

The bank was probably an atoll during the Pleistocene and then drowned. It is possible that unusually rapid geological subsidence of Alexa Bank outpaced the ability of its reefs to keep up. Originally, the flat surface of Alexa was explained by wave erosion during sea level lowstands.

== Biology ==
Dead corals and foraminifera occur on Alexa Bank. Some corals are still alive and form pinnacles on the surface of the bank. Algal rhodoliths and stromatoliths have been found on Alexa as well. The Japanese snake blenny has been found at Alexa Bank. Radiolarians in Eocene-Quaternary sediments south of Alexa Bank probably originate there.
