= Vityaz Trench =

Oceanic trench in the southwestern Pacific Ocean

Approximate surface projection on Pacific Ocean of the Vityaz Trench (blue). The approximate area of deep-focus earthquakes mentioned in the page text that may be associated with the old subduction at the trench is shaded light red.

The Vityaz Trench (also known as the Vitiaz or East Melanesian Trench) is an oceanic trench, a tectonic feature of the southwest Pacific Ocean floor.

== History ==
It is named after the Russian research vessel Vityaz that discovered it in 1958.

== Geography ==
It is northeast of Vanuatu with a greatest depth of 6.1 km (3.8 mi) but can be as shallow as 3.5 km (2.2 mi).

To its southeast are three discontinuous and elongated troughs called respectively the Alexa, Rotuma and Horne Troughs. They connect the Vityaz Trench via what is termed the Vitiaz Trench Lineament to the northern end of the Tonga Trench.

=== Tectonics ===
It was formed during the middle Neogene (activity stopped about 8 million years ago), when its location was the then-convergent plate boundary between the Pacific and Indo-Australian Plates. At this time the Vitiaz Arc was a continuous east-facing volcanic arc extending from the region of Tonga to the region of the Solomon Islands. Now it is inactive (i.e. fossil) but has geological importance as it separates the northern Cretaceous crust of the Pacific Plate from the Cenozoic basalts of the North Fiji and Lau Basins. To its south west is the East Melanesian Rise and onward, deep under the present North Fiji Basin is a zone of deep earthquakes believed to be associated with the slab of Pacific Crust subducted previously at the trench.
