= Samoa hotspot =

Volcanic hotspot located in the south Pacific Ocean

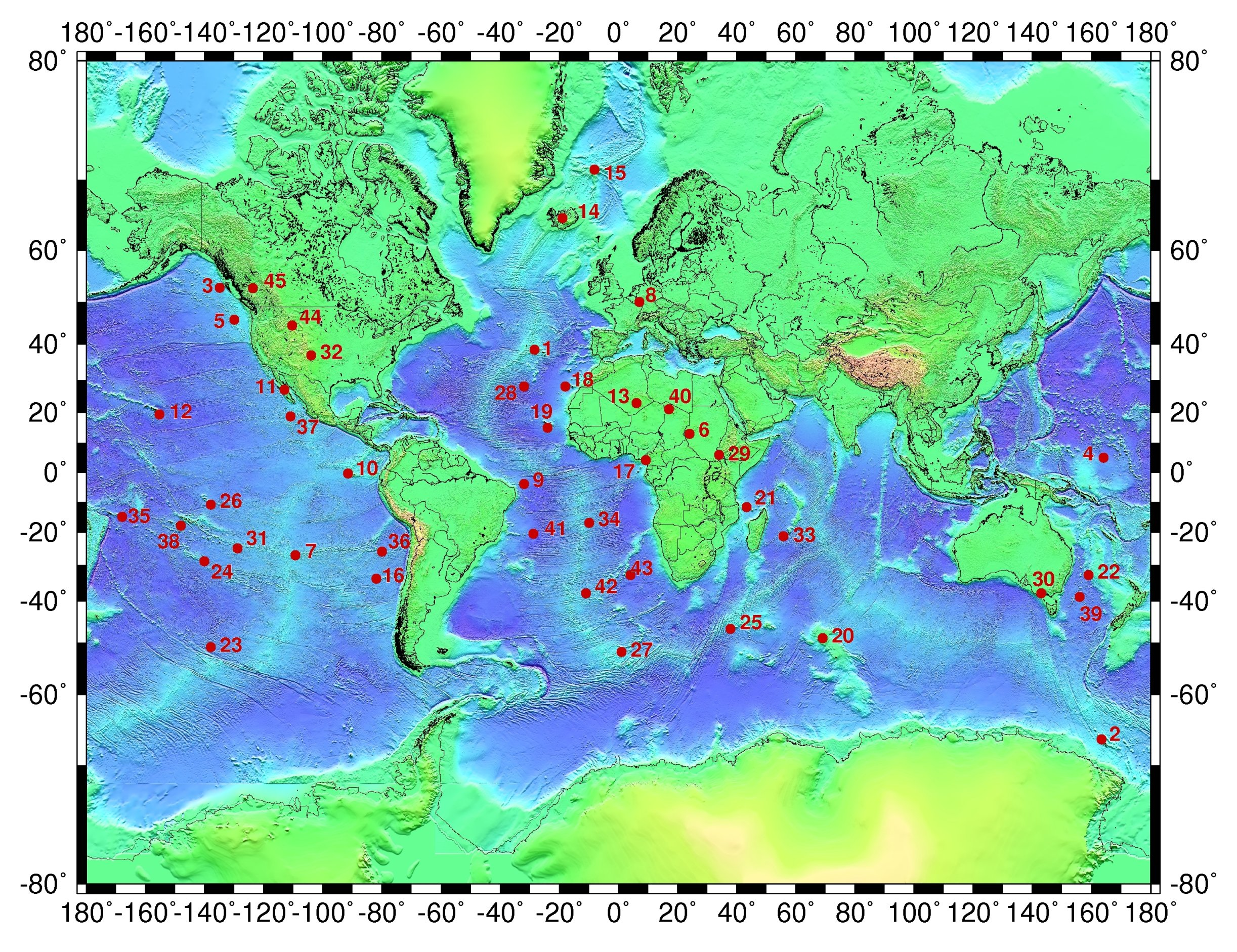
The Samoa hotspot is marked 35 on map.

Diagram showing how islands are formed by a hotspot: as the tectonic plate (brown) moves over the hotspot (red), a chain of volcanic islands is formed.

The Samoa hotspot is a volcanic hotspot located in the south Pacific Ocean. The hotspot model describes a hot upwelling plume of magma through the Earth's crust as an explanation of how volcanic islands are formed. The hotspot idea came from J. Tuzo Wilson in 1963 based on the Hawaiian Islands volcanic chain.

In theory, the Samoa hotspot is based on the Pacific Tectonic Plate travelling over a fixed hotspot located deep underneath the Samoan Islands. The Samoa hotspot has created the Samoan Islands (American Samoa and Samoa), the islands of Uvea or Wallis Island (Wallis and Futuna) and Niulakita (Tuvalu), as well as the submerged Pasco banks and Alexa Bank.

As the Pacific Plate moves slowly over the hotspot, thermal activity builds up and is released in magma plume spewing through the Earth's crust, forming each island in a chain. The Samoa islands generally lie in a straight line, east to west, in the same direction of the tectonic plate 'drifting' over the hotspot.

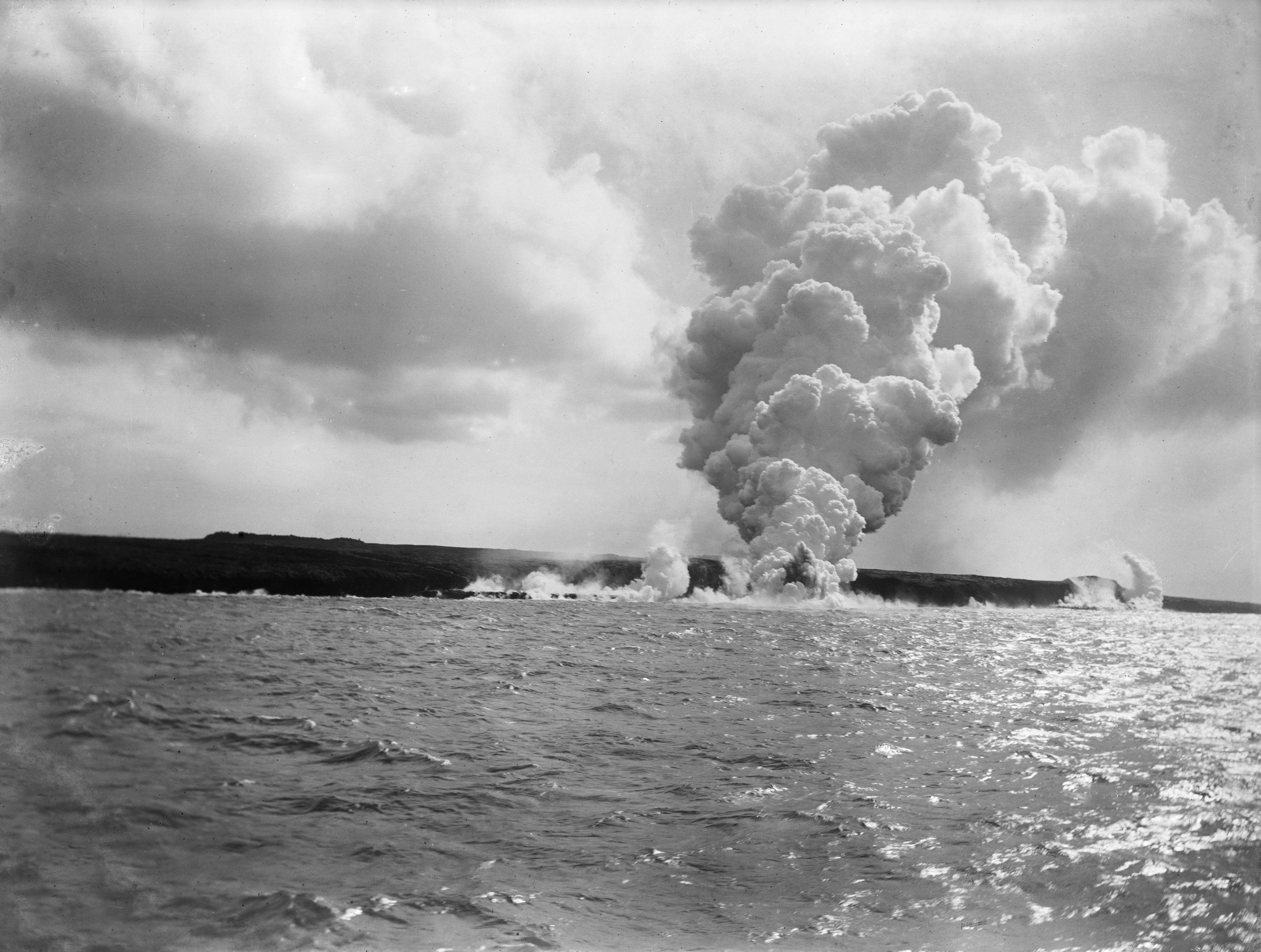
Mt Matavanu eruption on Savaiʻi island, 1905.

== Contribution to further understanding of hotspots ==
A characteristic of a “classic” hotspot, like the Hawaiʻi hotspot, results in islands located further from the hotspot being progressively older with newer and younger islands closest to the fixed hotspot, like the Kamaʻehuakanaloa Seamount (formerly Lōʻihi), the only submarine volcano in the hotspot chain which was initially studied in detail by scientists. The scientific research from Kamaʻehuakanaloa resulted in a 'Hawaiʻi' model for hotspots primarily limited to the information gathered from the Hawaiian Islands.

However, the Samoa hotspot has features that resulted in enigmas for scientists. In the Samoa Islands, the easternmost island of Taʻū and the westernmost island of Savaiʻi have both erupted in the past 150 years. The most recent eruption on Savaiʻi occurred with Mount Matavanu (1905–1911) and on Taʻū in 1866. This has been postulated to be due to enhanced rejuvenated volcanism associated with the close proximity to the northern Tonga Trench, which is just over 100 km (62 mi) south of the westernmost Samoan island of Savai’i. This volcanism was so voluminous that the entire island was covered with lava flows less than 1 million years of age. Compared to the previously most studied examples of late volcanism in the Hawaiian islands this was an excessive volume. Samples have been obtained showing that older Samoan hotspot composition lava of about 5 million years age underlaid this. It was further not understood initially that two members of the hotspot highway crossed just south of Samoa and that volcanoes in the Samoan region must be distinguished by age and/or geochemical composition to determine their hotspot of origin.

== Vailulu'u ==
In 1975, geophysicist Rockne Johnson discovered the Vailuluʻu Seamount, 45 km east of Taʻū island in American Samoa which has since been studied by an international team of scientists and characterised as the youngest voclano of the Samonian hotspot chain. Within the summit crater of Vailuluʻu is an active underwater volcanic cone called Nafanua, named after a war goddess in Samoan mythology. The study of Vailuluʻu provides scientists with another possible model for hotspots as an alternative to the Hawaiʻi hotspot model.

An important difference between Vailuluʻu and Kamaʻehuakanaloa in Hawaiʻi, is a total lack of tholeiitic basalt compositions at Vailuluʻu although both are located at the easternmost point of their respective island chains.

== Nearby tectonics ==
The northern Tonga Islands (Vavaʻu and Niuatoputapu) are moving away from Fiji on the Australian Plate at rates of about 13 cm/year (5.1 in/year) and 16 cm/year (6.3 in/year), respectively, while Niue and Rarotonga on the Pacific plate are approaching the Australian plate at about 8 cm/year (3.1 in/year). This implies that Pacific plate is tearing at the corner of the trench-transform boundary at a rate that is the sum of these two (16 + 8) 24 cm/year (9.4 in/year).

== Current understanding ==
The postulated rejuvenated volcanism in Samoa associated with the close proximity to the northern Tonga Trench has now been extended to the Papatua Seamount, 60 km (37 mi) south of the axis of the Samoan hotspot track. This seamount has lavas with both a Paleogene ocean island basalt composition typical for either the Arago hotspot or Macdonald hotspot and much younger rejuvenated lavas similar to rejuvenated volcanism on Samoa. Combined with the data from Uo Mamae seamount, it seems possible that flexural uplift in the Pacific Plate near the northern terminus of the Tonga Trench has resulted in melting of Samoan plume material that has erupted recently.

The Samoan hotspot track has two provinces:

1. Eastern Samoan Volcanic Province (ESAM) extending 350 km (220 mi)
  - From Savai‘i (hotspot volcanics aged from 5.29 Ma to the east at the currently active Vailulu‘u seamount
  - Two recent subtracks less than 170 km (110 mi) long from around 1.5 million years ago:
    1. Northern VAI subtrack, from Tamai'i Seamount to Vailulu'u
    2. Southern MALU subtrack, from Tutuila Island to Malumalu Seamount
2. Western Samoan Volcanic Province (WESAM)
  - Older Samoan volcanoes that lie to the west of Savai‘i and extend westward 1,300 km (810 mi) to Alexa Bank whose youngest volcanics are aged 23.96 Ma.
  - East Niulakita seamount has also both older Arago lavas (42.24 to 45.73 Ma) and younger shield-stage Samoan lavas (14.76 ± 0.12 Ma) on the Samoan seamount track.

There are 100 million year old seamounts beyound the disruption of the Ontong Java Plateau in the Western Pacific Seamount Province that have composition consistent with an origin over the Samoan hotspot.

Subducted Samoan mantle material has also been found erupted in the northern Tonga arc between 280 to 300 km (170 to 190 mi) to the south at Tafahi and Niuatoputapu, and in some lavas in the north western Lau basin.

The composition of some of the Samoan hotspot volcanics has revealed very high contributions from mantle melts that contain up to 7% continental crust sediments. This implies mixing in the mantle of subducted slabs is not as homogenous as previously expected.

Possible Samoa Seamounts (note if WESAM or ESAM definite)
Name	Assignment	Earliest Samoa Age/Ma	Other Age/Ma	Coordinates	Notes
Alexa	WESAM	22.9-23.9	-	11°35′00″S 175°19′48″E	
East Niulakita	WESAM	13.5-14.8	42.2 -45.7	-	Other older volcanics
Kosciuusko	-	-	47.4-48.1	-	North of WESAM line
Bustard	WESAM	3.5	-	-	off age progression, not proved to be rejuvenated Samoan as composition unknown, another sample without age is Alexa WESAM in composition so likely similar age to Alexa WESAM
Bayonnaise Seamount	WESAM	12.8-13.0	-	12°07′00″S 179°43′00″E	
Manuta Island	WESAM	4.4	-	13°18′S 179°18′E	
Favavesi Seamount	WESAM	12.9-13.2	-	12°39′S 179°12′E	
Faavevesk	WESAM	12.8-13.2	-	-	
Fa'aitu	WESAM	1.2-1.5	-	12°47′S 178°53′E	Vityaz Trench south edge, Composition consistent rejuvenated lava from Samoa Hotspot
Tuscarora	WESAM	12.2	-	11°59′S 178°16′E	
Lafetoga	WESAM	11.0-11.2	-	-	
Combe Seamount	WESAM	11.1	-	12°32′00″S 177°35′00″E	
Waterwitch	WESAM	10.5		12°47′S 176°30′E	reclassified as highest ^{206}Pb/^{204}Pb of WESAM but others had postulated not WESAM
Wallis Island	WESAM	0.08	-	13°18′S 176°12′E	End Tonga Trench, Composition consistent rejuvenated lava from Samoa Hotspot
Siafiafi	WESAM	-	-	12°18′S 176°04′E	
Lalla Rookh seamount	WESAM	1.6	-	12°55′S 175°23′E	Composition consistent rejuvenated lava from Samoa Hotspot
Talviuni	WESAM	-	-	12°16′S 174°38′E	
Pasco Seamount	WESAM	-	-	13°05′00″S 174°25′00″E	
Toafimeau	-	-	-	-	
Savaiʻi	ESAM	0.00001-5.3	-	13°35′00″S 172°25′00″E	Youngest rejuvenated, oldest classic composition
Uo Mamae	ESAM	0.94	-	-	Long suggested rejuvenated, is south of trend
Upolu	ESAM	0.09-2.8	-	13°55′00″S 171°45′00″E	Rejuvenated volcanism shown
Tisa Seamount	ESAM	2.18-3.0	-	14°25.9′S 171°19.9′E	
Soso Seamount	ESAM	1.1-1.43	-	13°46.1′S 170°14.5′E	
Tutuila	ESAM	1.0-1.8	0.024	14°18′S 170°42′E	Rejuvenated volcanism initiation occurred at 0.024 Ma
Papatua Guyot	ESAM	0.6	-	14°53′00″S 170°38′00″E	Older sample HIMU composition and south of trend
Tamai'i Seamount	ESAM	1.87-2.07	-	14°45.3′S 170°32.1′E	
Muli Seamount (Northeast Bank)	ESAM	0.77-0.97	-	14°1.1′S 170°11.3′E	
Tulaga Ridge	ESAM	0.79-1.06	-	14°39.1′S 170°1.4′E	
Ofu Island	ESAM	0.3-0.56	-	14°6.1′S 169°14.3′E	
Olosega Island	ESAM	0.001-0.56	-	14°10′14″S 169°37′18″E	
Ta'u	ESAM	0.02-0.7	-	14°14′00″S 169°28′00″E	
Malumalu Seamount	ESAM	0.008-0.3	-	14°36′29″S 169°47′06″W	
Vailulu'u	ESAM	0.0-0.2	-	14°12′54″S 169°03′30″E	
Malulu	-	-	-	-	no good samples, but unlikely to be ESAM
Rose Bank	-	-	24.8	11°00′S 179°45′E	Not ESAM

== See also ==
- Arago hotspot
- Rarotonga hotspot
- Macdonald hotspot
