= Southern Ocean overturning circulation =

Southern half of the global ocean current system

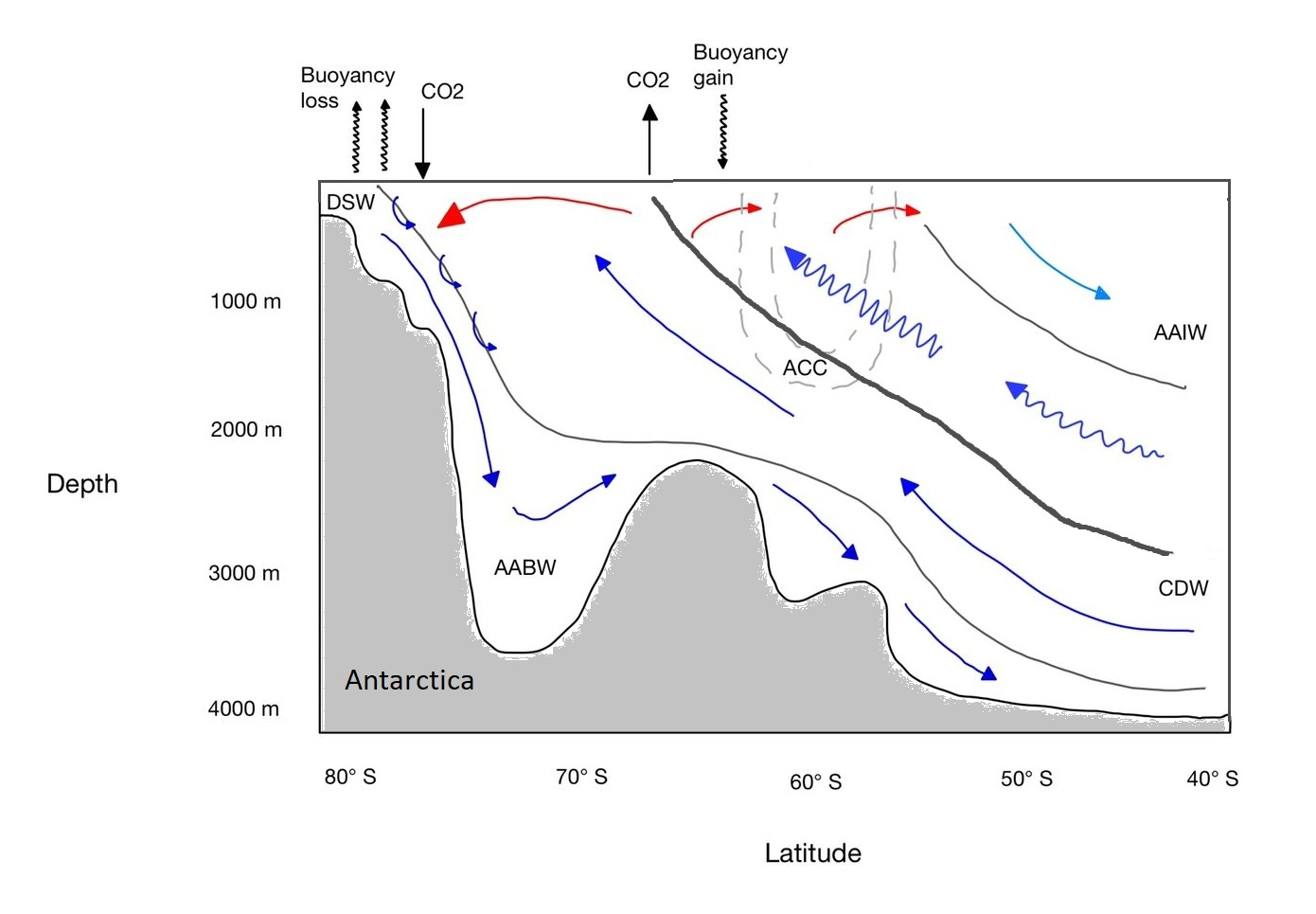
A schematic overview of the Southern Ocean overturning circulation. The arrows point in the direction of the water movement. The lower cell of the circulation is depicted by the upwelling arrows south of the Antarctic Circumpolar Current (ACC) and the formation of Antarctic Bottom Water beneath the sea ice of Antarctica due to buoyancy loss. The upper cell is depicted by the upwelling arrows north of the ACC and the formation of lighter Antarctic Intermediate water due to buoyancy gain north of the ACC.

Southern Ocean overturning circulation (sometimes referred to as the Southern Meridional overturning circulation (SMOC) or Antarctic overturning circulation) is the southern half of a global thermohaline circulation, which connects different water basins across the global ocean. Its better-known northern counterpart is the Atlantic meridional overturning circulation (AMOC). This circulation operates when certain currents send warm, oxygenated, nutrient-poor water into the deep ocean (downwelling), while the cold, oxygen-limited, nutrient-rich water travels upwards (or upwells) at specific points. Thermohaline circulation transports not only massive volumes of warm and cold water across the planet, but also dissolved oxygen, dissolved organic carbon and other nutrients such as iron. Thus, both halves of the circulation have a great effect on Earth's energy budget and oceanic carbon cycle, and so play an essential role in the Earth's climate system.

Southern ocean overturning circulation itself consists of two parts, the upper and the lower cell. The smaller upper cell is most strongly affected by winds due to its proximity to the surface, while the behaviour of the larger lower cell is defined by the temperature and salinity of Antarctic bottom water. The strength of both halves had undergone substantial changes in the recent decades: the flow of the upper cell has increased by 50–60% since 1970s, while the lower cell has weakened by 10–20%. This has been partly due to the natural cycle of Interdecadal Pacific Oscillation, and climate change has played a substantial role in both trends, as it had altered the Southern Annular Mode weather pattern, while the massive growth of ocean heat content in the Southern Ocean has increased the melting of the Antarctic ice sheets, and this fresh meltwater dilutes salty Antarctic bottom water.

As the formation of dense and cold waters weakens near the coast while the flow of warm waters towards the coast strengthens, the surface waters become less likely to sink downwards and mix with the lower layers. Consequently, ocean stratification increases. One study suggests that the circulation would lose half its strength by 2050 under the worst climate change scenario, with greater losses occurring afterwards. This slowdown would have important effects on the global climate due to the strength of the Southern Ocean as a global carbon sink and heat sink. For instance, global warming will reach 2 °C (3.6 °F) in all scenarios where greenhouse gas emissions have not been strongly lowered, but when this will happen depends on the status of the circulation more than any factor other than overall emissions.

Paleoclimate evidence shows that the entire circulation had strongly weakened or outright collapsed before: some preliminary research suggests that such a collapse may become likely once global warming reaches levels between 1.7 °C (3.1 °F) and 3 °C (5.4 °F). However, there is far less certainty than with the estimates for most other tipping points in the climate system. Even if the circulation's collapse starts in the near future, it is unlikely to be complete until close to 2300, Similarly, impacts such as the reduction in precipitation in the Southern Hemisphere, with a corresponding increase in the North, or a decline of fisheries in the Southern Ocean with a potential collapse of certain marine ecosystems, are also expected to unfold over multiple centuries.

== Dynamics ==
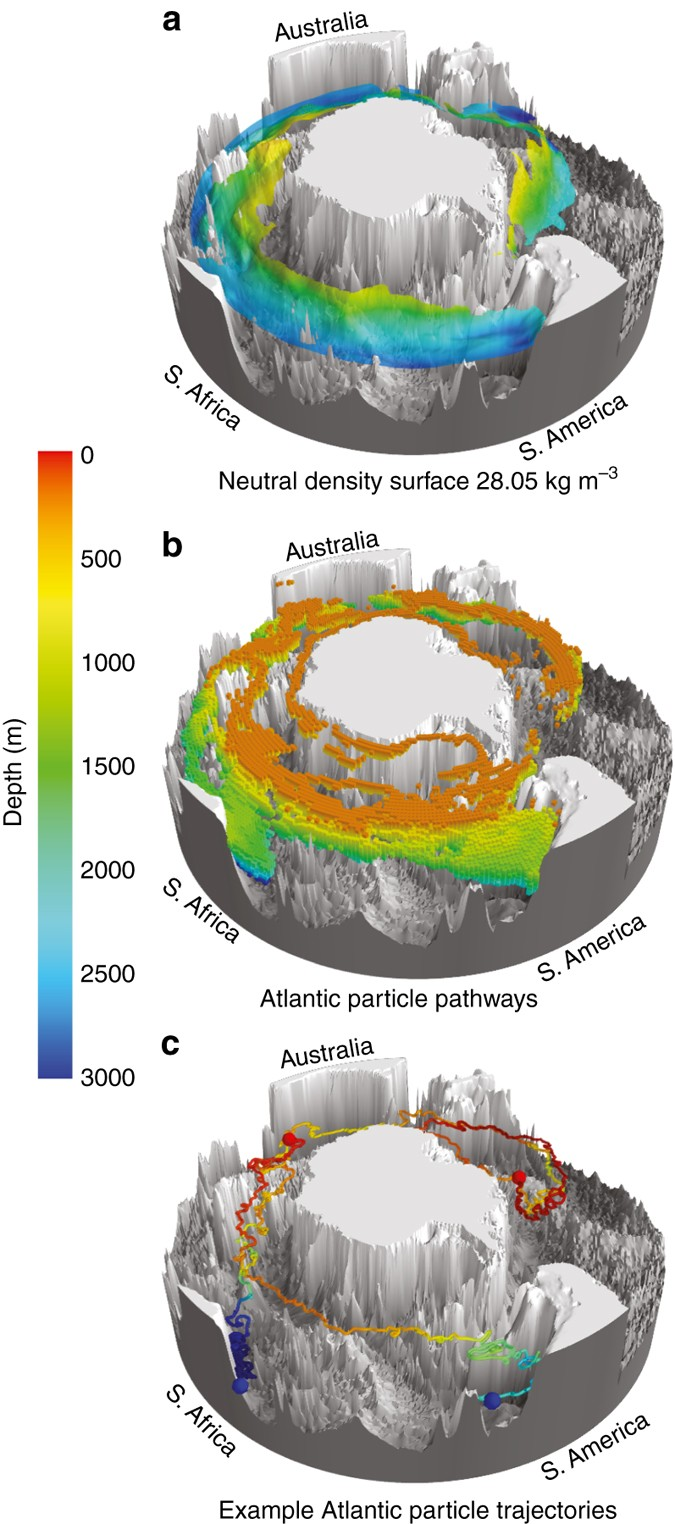
3D representation of North Atlantic Deep Water upwelling in the Southern Ocean basin, which closes the connection between the Atlantic and Southern circulation, and takes place along the defined pathways with limited mixing.

Southern Ocean overturning circulation consists of two cells in the Southern Ocean, which are driven by upwelling and downwelling. The upwelling in the upper cell is associated with mid-deep water that is brought to the surface, whereas the upwelling in the lower cell is linked to the fresh and abyssal waters around Antarctica. Around 27 ± 7 Sverdrup (Sv) of deep water wells up to the surface in the Southern Ocean. This upwelled water is partly transformed to lighter water and denser water, respectively 22 ± 4 Sv and 5 ± 5 Sv. The densities of these waters change due to heat and buoyancy fluxes which result in upwelling in the upper cell and downwelling in the lower cell.

The Southern Ocean plays a key role in the closure of the Atlantic meridional overturning circulation by compensating for the North Atlantic downwelling by upwelling of North Atlantic Deep Water and connects the interior ocean to the surface. This upwelling is induced by the strong westerly winds that blow over the ACC. Observations suggest that approximately 80 percent of global deep water is upwelled in the Southern Ocean. Circulation is a slow process – for instance, the upwelling of North Atlantic Deep Water from the depths of 1,000–3,500 m (3,281–11,483 ft) to the surface mixed layer takes 60–90 years for just half of the water mass, and some water travels to the surface for more than a century.

=== Upper cell ===
The upper cell is driven by wind generated flow, a result of the Westerlies, that brings water from the Circumpolar Deep Water (CDW) to the surface. Zonal wind stress induces upwelling near the pole and downwelling at the equator due to the zonal surface-wind maximum. This wind-driven circulation is also called the Deacon cell and acts to overturn water supporting the thermal wind current of the Antarctic Circumpolar Current (ACC) and creating a storage of potential energy. This upper cell process is also known as Ekman transport.

The meridional overturning flow is from the north to the south in deep waters and from the south to the north at the ocean surface. At the surface deep waters are exposed to the atmosphere and surface buoyancy forces. There is a net gain of buoyancy in the upper cell as a result of the freshening of the water caused by precipitation and the melting of sea ice during summer (on the Southern Hemisphere). This buoyancy gain transforms the waters into lighter, less dense waters, such as Subantarctic Mode Water (SAMW) and Antarctic Intermediate Water (AAIW). Around 22 ± 4 Sv of the total upwelled water in the overturning circulation is transformed into lighter waters in the upper cell. The overturning process of density surfaces is balanced through the baroclinic instability of the thermal wind currents. This instability flattens the density surfaces and the transport towards the poles, resulting in energetic, time-dependent eddying motions. The potential energy from the wind-driven circulation is then flattened out by eddies.

==== Missing-mixing paradox ====
The missing-mixing paradox assumes that dense water is upwelled through the thermocline to close the circulation. To achieve this, vertical mixing is needed in the thermocline, which is not observed. Instead, dense water from sinking regions returned to the surface in nearly adiabatic pathways along density isopycnals, which was already written by Harald Sverdrup.

=== Lower cell ===
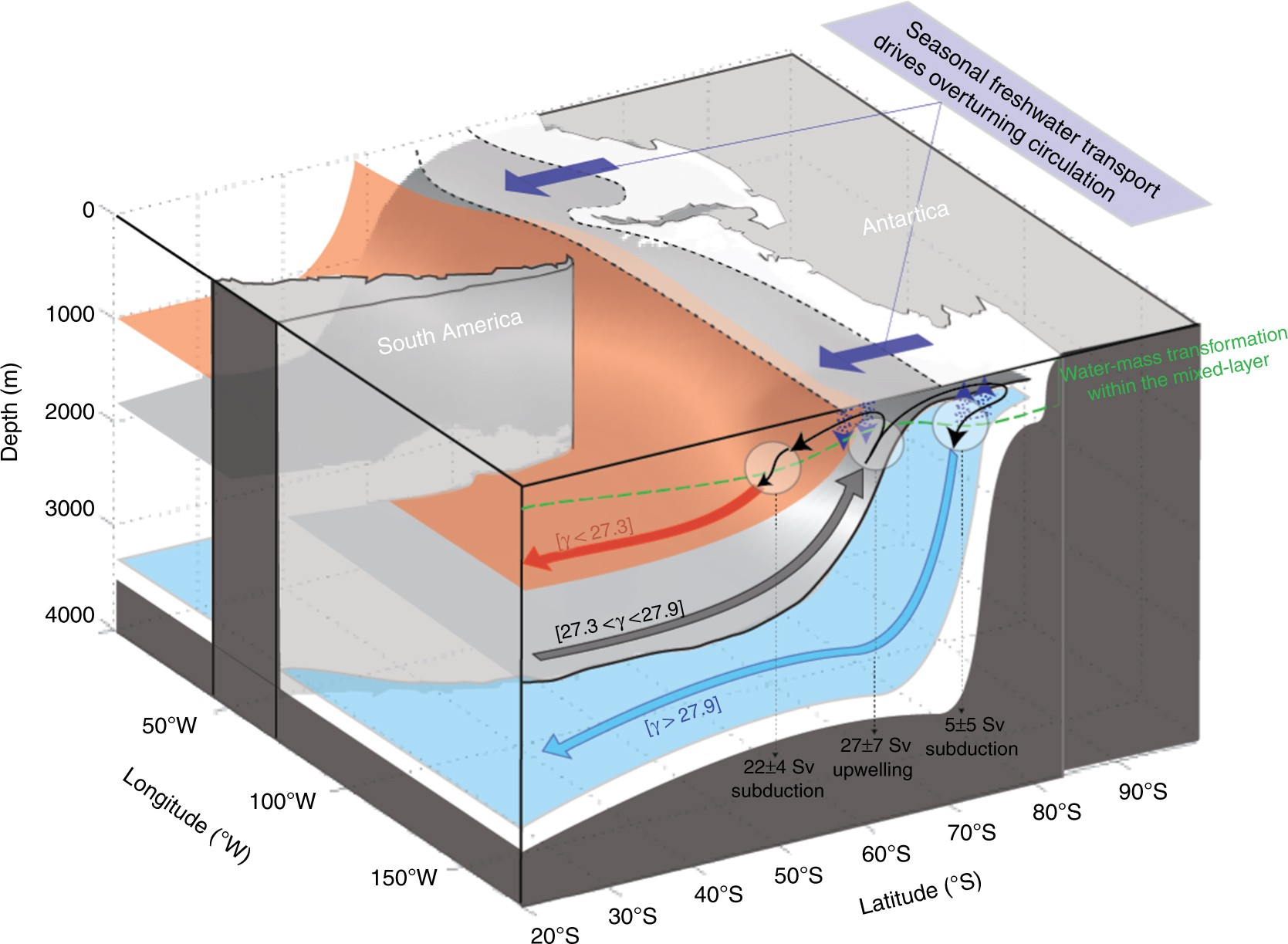
The role of seasonal meltwater from the Antarctic ice sheet in driving the lower-cell circulation.

The lower cell is driven by freshwater fluxes where sea-ice formation and melting play an important role. The formation of sea-ice is accompanied by brine rejection, resulting in water with a higher salinity and density and therefore buoyancy loss. When ice melts there is a freshwater flow and exposure to the atmosphere. If water turns into ice, there is more salt in the water and less exposure to the atmosphere. Due to seasonal variations, there is a gain of buoyancy during summer and a loss of buoyancy in winter. This cold and dense water filled with salt is called Dense Shelf Water (DSW). DSW is then transformed into Antarctic Bottom Water (AABW), originating from the Ross Sea, Weddell Sea and along the eastern coast of Antarctica. Around 5 ± 5 Sv of AABW is formed in the lower cell of the Southern Ocean circulation, which is around a third of the total AABW formation.

== Global carbon cycle ==
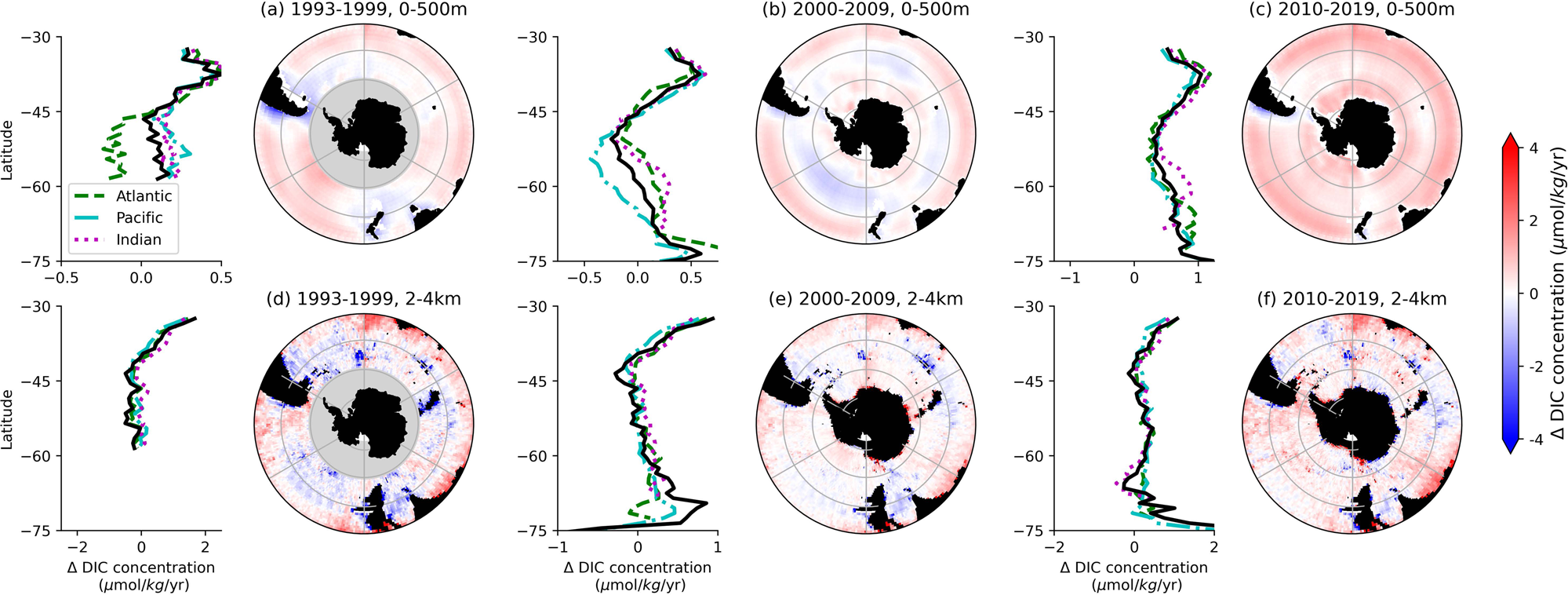
In the 1990s and 2000s, the concentration of dissolved organic carbon at the surface had been decreasing, as more was pushed to the depths through the circulation. In the 2010s, however, the weakening circulation moved less carbon downwards, and its concentration started to increase across the surface.

The ocean is normally in equilibrium with the atmospheric carbon dioxide concentration. The increase in atmospheric CO_{2} since the Industrial Revolution had turned the oceans into a net carbon sink, and they absorb around 25% of human-caused emissions. Out of all oceans, the Southern Ocean plays the greatest role in carbon uptake, and on its own, it is responsible for around 40%. In 2000s, some research suggested that climate-driven changes to Southern Hemisphere winds were reducing the amount of carbon it absorbed, but subsequent research found that this carbon sink had been even stronger than estimated earlier, by some 14% to 18%. Ocean circulation is very important for this process, as it brings deep water to the surface, which has not been there for centuries and so was not in contact with anthropogenic emissions before. Thus, deep water's dissolved carbon concentrations are much lower than of the modern surface waters, and it absorbs a lot more carbon before it's transported back to the depths through downwelling.

On the other hand, regions where deep warm circumpolar carbon rich waters are brought to the surface through upwelling, outgas CO_{2} through exposure to the atmosphere, partly compensating the carbon sink effect of the overturning circulation. Additionally, ocean upwelling brings mineral nutrients such as iron from the depths to the surface, which are then consumed by phytoplankton and allow them to increase their numbers, enhancing ocean primary production and boosting the carbon sink due to greater photosynthesis. At the same time, downwelling circulation moves much of dead phytoplankton and other organic matter to the depths before it could decompose at the surface and release CO_{2} back to the atmosphere. This so-called biological pump is so important that a completely abiotic Southern Ocean, where this pump would be absent, would also be a net source of CO_{2}.

== Climate change impacts ==
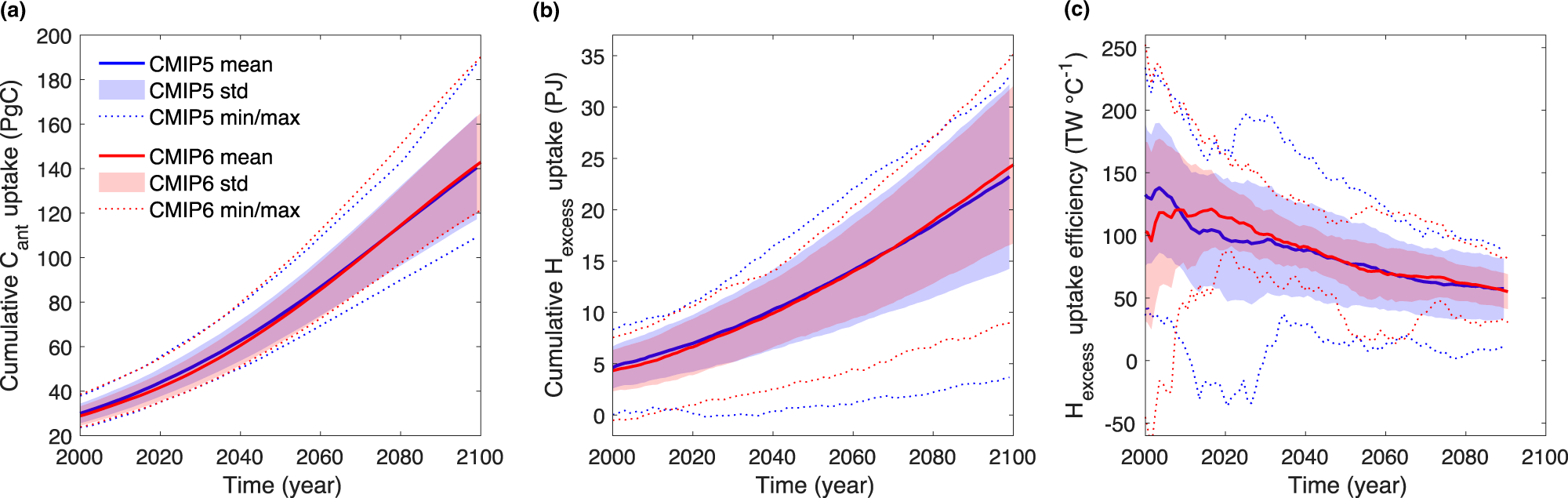
Even under the most intense climate change scenario, which is currently considered unlikely, the Southern Ocean would continue to function as a strong sink in the 21st century, and take up an increasing amount of carbon dioxide (left) and heat (middle). However, it would take up a smaller fraction of heat per every additional degree of warming than it does now (right), as well as a smaller fraction of emissions.

As human-caused greenhouse gas emissions cause increased warming, one of the most notable effects of climate change on oceans is the increase in ocean heat content, which accounted for over 90% of the total global heating since 1971. Much of this increase has occurred in the extratropical Southern Hemisphere ocean south of 30°S. In West Antarctica, the temperature in the upper layer of the ocean has warmed 1 °C (1.8 °F) since 1955, and the Antarctic Circumpolar Current (ACC) is also warming faster than the global average. This warming directly affects the flow of warm and cold water masses which make up the overturning circulation, and it also reduces the cover of sea ice (which is highly reflective and so elevates the albedo of Earth's surface) in the Southern Hemisphere, as well as mass balance of Antarctica's ice shelves and peripheral glaciers. For these reasons, climate models consistently show that the year when global warming will reach 2 °C (3.6 °F) (inevitable in all climate change scenarios where greenhouse gas emissions have not been strongly lowered) depends on the status of the circulation more than any other factor besides the emissions themselves.

Greater warming of this ocean water increases ice loss from Antarctica, and also generates more fresh meltwater, at a rate of 1100–1500 billion tons (GT) per year. This meltwater from the Antarctic ice sheet then mixes back into the Southern Ocean, making its water fresher. This freshening of the Southern Ocean causes increased stratification and stabilization of its layers, and this has the single largest impact on the long-term properties of Southern Ocean circulation. These changes in the Southern Ocean cause the upper cell circulation to speed up, accelerating the flow of major currents, while the lower cell circulation slows down, as it is dependent on the highly saline Antarctic bottom water, which already appears to have been observably weakened by the freshening, in spite of the limited recovery during 2010s. Since the 1970s, the upper cell has strengthened by 3–4 sverdrup (Sv; represents a flow of 1 million cubic meters per second), or 50–60% of its flow, while the lower cell has weakened by a similar amount, but because of its larger volume, these changes represent a 10–20% weakening. However, they were not fully caused by climate change, as the natural cycle of Interdecadal Pacific Oscillation had also played an important role.

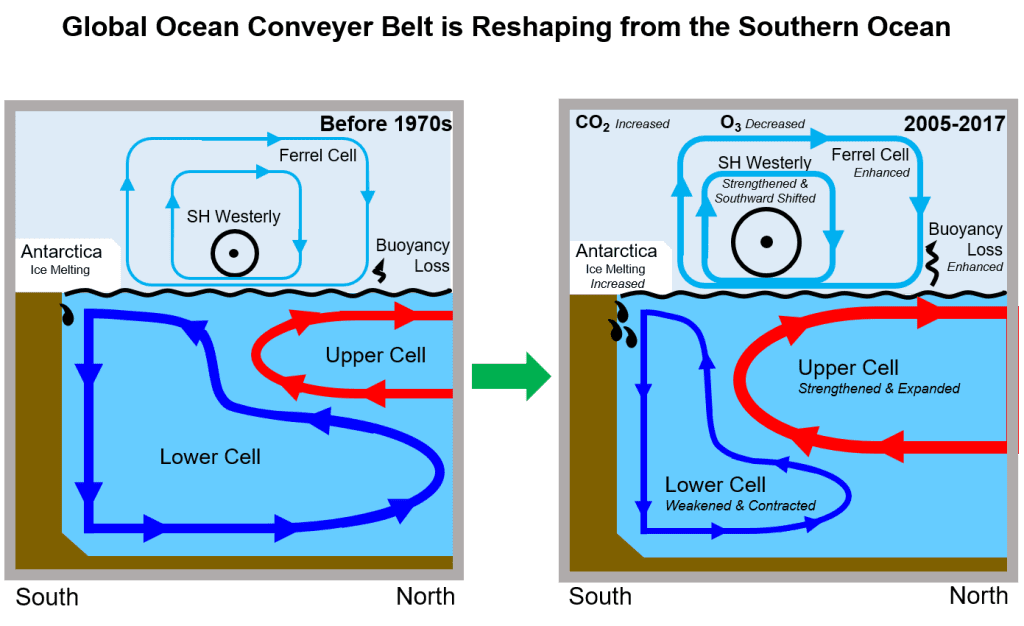
Since the 1970s, the upper cell of the circulation has strengthened, while the lower cell weakened.

Additionally, the main controlling pattern of the extratropical Southern Hemisphere's climate is the Southern Annular Mode (SAM), which has been spending more and more years in its positive phase due to climate change (as well as the aftermath of ozone depletion), which means more warming and more precipitation over the ocean due to stronger westerlies, freshening the Southern Ocean further. Climate models currently disagree on whether the Southern Ocean circulation would continue to respond to changes in SAM the way it does now, or if it will eventually adjust to them. As of early 2020s, their best, limited-confidence estimate is that the lower cell would continue to weaken, while the upper cell may strengthen by around 20% over the 21st century. A key reason for the uncertainty is the poor and inconsistent representation of ocean stratification in even the CMIP6 models – the most advanced generation available as of early 2020s. Furthermore, the largest long-term role in the state of the circulation is played by Antarctic meltwater, and Antarctic ice loss had been the least-certain aspect of future sea level rise projections for a long time.

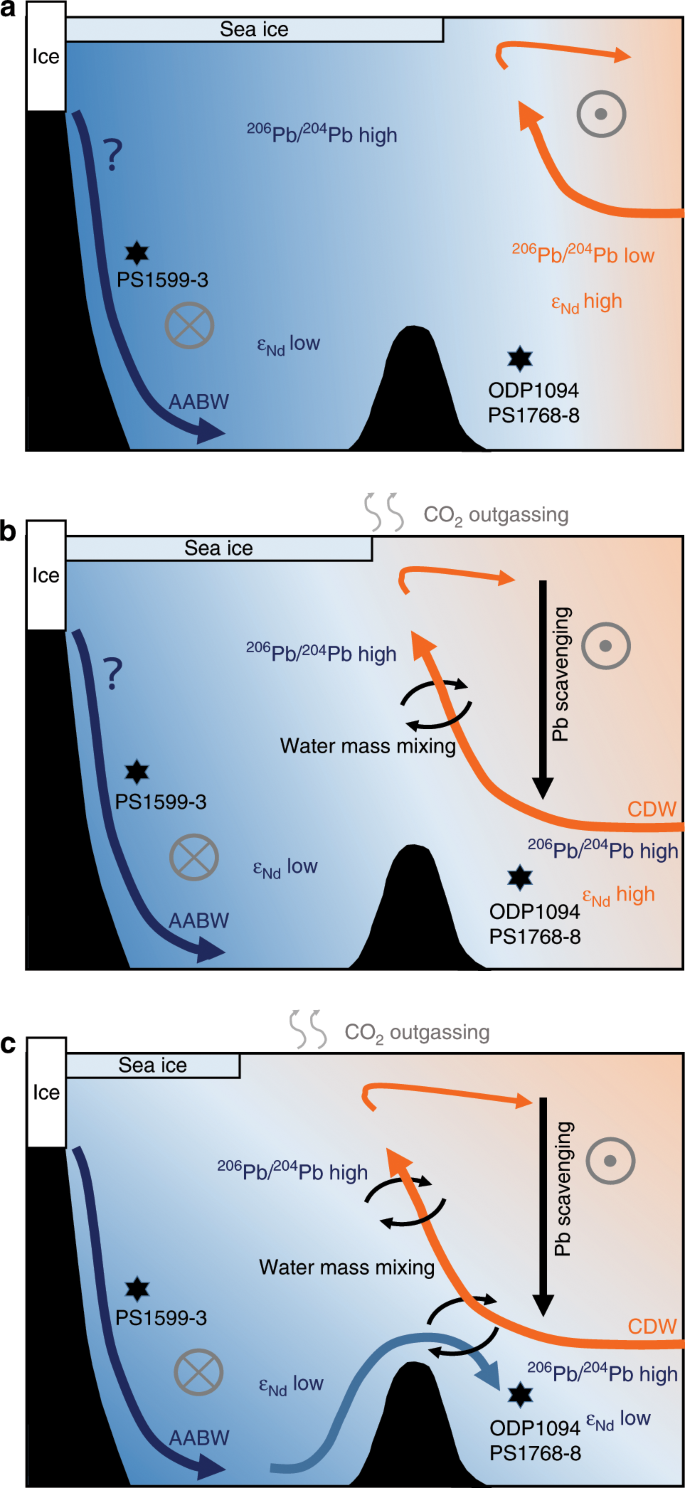
Evidence suggests that the Antarctic bottom water requires a temperature range close to current conditions to be at full strength. During the Last Glacial Maximum (a cold period), it was too weak to flow out of the Weddell Sea and the overturning circulation was much weaker than now. It was also weaker during the periods warmer than now.

Similar processes are taking place with Atlantic meridional overturning circulation (AMOC), which is also affected by the ocean warming and by meltwater flows from the declining Greenland ice sheet. It is possible that both circulations may not simply continue to weaken in response to increased warming and freshening, but eventually collapse to a much weaker state outright, in a way which would be difficult to reverse and constitute an example of tipping points in the climate system. There is paleoclimate evidence for the overturning circulation being substantially weaker than now during past periods that were both warmer and colder than now. However, Southern Hemisphere is only inhabited by 10% of the world's population, and the Southern Ocean overturning circulation has historically received much less attention than the AMOC. Consequently, while multiple studies have set out to estimate the exact level of global warming which could result in AMOC collapsing, the timeframe over which such collapse may occur, and the regional impacts it would cause, much less equivalent research exists for the Southern Ocean overturning circulation as of the early 2020s. There has been a suggestion that its collapse may occur between 1.7 °C (3.1 °F) and 3 °C (5.4 °F), but this estimate is much less certain than for many other tipping points.

The impacts of Southern Ocean overturning circulation collapse have also been less closely studied, though scientists expect them to unfold over multiple centuries. A notable example is the loss of nutrients from Antarctic bottom water diminishing ocean productivity and ultimately the state of Southern Ocean fisheries, potentially leading to the extinction of some species of fish, and the collapse of some marine ecosystems. Reduced marine productivity would also mean that the ocean absorbs less carbon (though not within the 21st century), which could increase the ultimate long-term warming in response to anthropogenic emissions (thus raising the overall climate sensitivity) and/or prolong the time warming persists before it starts declining on the geological timescales. There is also expected to be a decline in precipitation in the Southern Hemisphere countries like Australia, with a corresponding increase in the Northern Hemisphere. However, the decline or an outright collapse of the AMOC would have similar but opposite impacts, and the two would counteract each other up to a point. Both impacts would also occur alongside the other effects of climate change on the water cycle and effects of climate change on fisheries.
