= Bottom water =

Lowermost water mass in a water body

Bottom water is the lowermost water mass in a water body, by its bottom, with distinct characteristics in terms of physics, chemistry, and ecology.

== Oceanography ==
Bottom water consists of cold, dense water near the ocean floor. This water is characterized by low salinity and nutrient content. Generally, low salinity from seasonal ice melt and freshwater river output characterizes bottom water produced in the Antarctic. However, during colder months, the formation of sea ice is a crucial process that raises the salinity of bottom water through brine rejection. As saltwater freezes, salt is expelled from the ice into the surrounding water. The oxygen content in bottom water is high due to ocean circulation. In the Antarctic, salty and cold surface water sinks to lower depths due to its high density. As the surface water sinks, it carries oxygen from the surface with it and will spend an enormous amount of time circulating across the seafloor of ocean basins. Oxygen-rich water moving throughout the bottom layer of the ocean is an important source for the respiration of benthic organisms. Bottom waters flow very slowly, driven mainly by slope topography and differences in temperature and salinity, especially compared to wind-driven surface ocean currents.

Antarctic Bottom Water is the most dominant source of bottom water in southern parts of the Pacific Ocean, Indian Ocean, and North Atlantic Ocean. Antarctic Bottom Water sits underneath the North Atlantic Deep Water due to its colder temperature and higher density. Salinity can be used to compare the movement between fresh Antarctic Bottom Water (roughly 34.7 psu) and saltier North Atlantic Deep Water. Antarctic Bottom Water can be distinguished from other intermediate and deep water masses by its cold, low nutrient, high oxygen, and low salinity content.

The bottom water of the Arctic Ocean is more isolated, due to the topography of the Arctic Ocean floor and the surrounding Arctic shelves. Deep Western Boundary Currents carry the Antarctic Bottom Water northward in the South Atlantic Ocean. The Antarctic Bottom Water shifts east when it reaches the equator, thus turning it into an eastern boundary current along the mid-Atlantic Ridge. The movement of the Antarctic Bottom Water across isopycnals is limited by deep sills. Sills are shallow seafloor regions that stop water from flowing across basins.

Climate Change and Antarctic Bottom Water

Changes in the characterization of Antarctic Bottom Water have been monitored in the Southern Ocean. The Antarctic Bottom Water’s temperature has increased and the salinity continues to freshen. Since the water mass is heating up and getting fresher, the density is significantly lowering. This has to do with Global Warming heating up the atmosphere and the ocean resulting in sea ice melt, sea level rise, and ocean acidification. Ventilation has also slowed down as a result of global warming. Antarctic Bottom Water has such high oxygen content that it is able to contribute to the ventilation of the deep ocean by acting as a circulatory system. Long-term shifts in temperature increase have slowed the rate of ocean ventilation. As the atmosphere warms, that decreases the formation of sea ice in Antarctica, thus decreasing the density of the surrounding water. The decreased density leads to a slower rate of convection ultimately slowing down deep water formation processes. Essential processes like upwelling begin to regress. Without upwelling, cold, nutrient-rich water can’t be recycled to the surface to create areas of high productivity.

== Estuaries ==
Bottom water by an estuary of a river discharging into a saline body exhibits peculiar transport of mud. Due to fresh/saline water intermixing by the estuary, a horizontal isohale gradient is created, with lower salinity levels upstream, which generates the upstream flow of the bottom water. Mud particles carried by river begin settling down as the current and turbulence decrease. When the particles nearly reach the floor, they are carried back to the head of estuary to accumulate at the point where the salinity of the surface and bottom waters become comparable and the bottom flow decreases. This process results in a distinguished pile of mud at this point.

== Lake hydrography ==
Bottom water of lakes may feature lower levels of oxygen, to the point of completely vanished dissolved oxygen (i.e., becoming anaerobic), and higher levels of chlorinity and organic-induced acidity. In many lakes, especially in the zones of continental climate, summer heating and winter cooling create strong vertical temperature gradients which oppose water intermixing, resulting in the periods of summer and winter thermal lake stratification. They are intervened by bottom water overturning, which happens in autumn (autumn overturn) and in spring (spring overturn) due to equalizing of temperature gradients and the resulting easier intermixing by wind and other sources of turbulence.

== See also ==
- Surface water

== Sources ==
- Talley, Lynne D.; Pickard, George L.; Emery, William J.; Swift, James H. (2011). Descriptive Physical Oceanography: An Introduction. Academic Press. ISBN 978-0-7506-4552-2.
