= Antarctic Intermediate Water =

Water mass in the Southern Ocean

Antarctic Intermediate Water (AAIW) is a cold, relatively low salinity water mass found mostly at intermediate depths in the Southern Ocean. The AAIW is formed at the ocean surface in the Antarctic Convergence zone or more commonly called the Antarctic Polar Front zone. This convergence zone is normally located between 50°S and 60°S, hence this is where almost all of the AAIW is formed.

== Properties ==
The AAIW is a unique water mass in that it is a sinking water mass with a moderately low salinity, unlike most sinking water masses which have a relatively high salinity. This salinity minimum, unique to the AAIW, can be recognized throughout the Southern Ocean at depths ranging from 700 to 1200 meters. Typical temperature values for the AAIW are 3-7°C, and a salinity of 34.2-34.4 psu upon initial formation. Due to vertical mixing at intermediate depths in the Southern Ocean, the salinity slowly rises as it moves northward. Typical density of AAIW water is between 1026.82 kg/m^{3} and 1027.43 kg/m^{3}. The thickness of the AAIW ranges greatly between where it forms and its most northern extent.

== Formation ==
The formation of AAIW can be explained very simply through the Ekman transport process and the divergence and convergence of water masses. The winds over Antarctica are called the polar easterlies where winds blow from the east to the west. This creates a counter-clockwise surface current near the coast of Antarctica, called the Antarctic Coastal Current. Ekman transport causes the water to push towards the left of the surface motion in the Southern Hemisphere. Thus, this westward directed coastal current in Antarctica will push the water towards Antarctica.

At the same time there is a strong current north of the Antarctic Coastal Current, called the Antarctic Circumpolar Current (ACC) created by the strong westerlies in this region which flows clockwise around Antarctica. Again, Ekman transport will push this water to the left of the surface motion, meaning away from Antarctica. Because water just offshore of Antarctica is being pushed away and into Antarctica, it leads to the Antarctic Divergence region. Here, upwelling of North Atlantic Deep Water (NADW) takes place. NADW is cold and quite saline. Once the NADW is upwelled to the surface some of it diverges towards Antarctica, gets colder, and sinks back down as Antarctic Bottom Water.

The NADW water also diverges away from Antarctica when it is upwelled. This diverged water moves northward (equatorward), and at the same time persistent precipitation (location is near the polar lows ~60°S) along with an influx of melt water decreases the salinity of the original NADW. Because the salinity of the NADW has changed by so much and it has essentially lost all its unique characteristics to be NADW, this northward propagating surface water is now called Antarctic Surface Water (AASW). Also, the AASW movement northward has gained some heat from the atmosphere, thereby increasing the temperature slightly.

When this water reaches between 50°S and 60°S it encounters the Antarctic Convergence zone. At this point the Subantarctic waters, which are characterized as being much warmer than the Antarctic waters, are just north of the Antarctic Polar Front and the Antarctic waters are just south of the Antarctic Polar Front. This region is referred to as the Antarctic Convergence Zone/Antarctic Polar Front because of the sharp gradients in both temperature and salinity (esp. temperature) between the Antarctic waters and the Subantarctic waters. It is also a region of strong vertical mixing. This convergence zone does not occur simply because the Subantarctic water is flowing southward and the AASW is flowing northward, but due to Ekman convergence.

Once the northward propagating Antarctic Surface Water reaches the Antarctic Convergence zone it begins to sink because it is more dense than the Subantarctic water to its north, but less dense than the Antarctic water to its south. This water is then referred to as AAIW. The sinking AAIW becomes sandwiched between the Subantarctic water (above) which is much warmer, but more saline and the NADW (below) which is cold and quite salty.

For many years the aforementioned formation of AAIW was thought to be the only formation process. Recent studies have found that there exists some evidence that some Subantarctic mode water is able to penetrate through the Subantarctic front (frontal region separating the Polar frontal zone from the Subantarctic zone) and become the dominant source of AAIW, rather than the AASW. Because of the difficulty of getting observations in this very treacherous area, this research on Subantarctic mode water mixing theory is still being worked out, but a lot of evidence exists for its inclusion in the formation of AAIW. The biggest source of AAIW formation is just southwest of the southern tip of South America.

== Areal extent and movement ==
The interesting characteristic of AAIW is how far it extends northward. The salinity minima associated with the AAIW can be seen in intermediate waters (~1000m) as far north as 20°N, with trace amounts as far as 60°N. It is by far the largest spreading intermediate water of all the ocean intermediate water masses. It continues northward until it encounters other intermediate water masses (e.g.AIW). The movement of the AAIW is predominantly northward due to the Ekman volume transport mostly directed in that way. When the AAIW is initially formed, the ACC is able to transport the AAIW into all ocean basins because the ACC flows clockwise around Antarctica with no land based boundaries.
