= Circumpolar deep water =

Water mass in the Pacific and Indian oceans

North Atlantic Deep Water and Antarctic Bottom Water blend to form Circumpolar Deep Water.

Circumpolar Deep Water (CDW) is a designation given to the water mass in the Pacific and Indian oceans that is a mixing of other water masses in the region. It is characteristically warmer and saltier than the surrounding water masses, causing CDW to contribute to the melting of ice shelves in the Antarctic region.

== Physical properties ==
CDW, the greatest volume water mass in the Southern Ocean, includes the North Atlantic Deep Water (NADW), the Antarctic Bottom Water (AABW), Antarctic Intermediate Water (AAIW), as well as recirculated deep water from the Indian and Pacific Oceans. A distinguishing characteristic of the CDW is that the water is not formed at the surface, but rather by a blending of other water masses. CDW sits at a depth of around 500 meters, approximately at the depth of the continental shelf.

There are two types of CDW: Upper Circumpolar Deep Water (UCDW) and Lower Circumpolar Deep Water (LCDW). UCDW originates in the Indian and Pacific Oceans and has lower oxygen levels and higher nutrients than LCDW. LCDW comes from North Atlantic Deep Water and has a higher salinity. In the Indian Ocean, CDW has a temperature of 1.0–2.0 °C (33.8–35.6 °F). In the Pacific Ocean, it is slightly colder with a temperature of 0.1–2.0 °C (32.2–35.6 °F). The salinity of CDW is 34.62 to 34.73 ‰.

Because CDW is a mix of other water masses, its temperature-salinity (TS) profile is the point where the TS lines of the other water masses converge. TS diagrams refer to temperature and salinity profiles, which are one of the major ways water masses are distinguished from each other. The convergence of the TS lines thus proves the mixing of the other water masses.

== Influence on Antarctic ecosystems and ice shelves ==
CDW plays an important role in the Antarctic Circumpolar Current (ACC) because it contributes to the melting of the base of ice shelves. Glaciers ending in CDW have melted considerably while glaciers in the northwest, with no CDW, have not. The CDW is salty and slightly above freezing temperature, which is warm compared to ice shelves. When the CDW flows upward onto the continental shelf and travels through the deep canyons, it reaches the underside of the ice shelves. The warmer water makes contact with the shelves, contributing to the ice shelf melting. Gradients around Antarctica formed between shelf water and CDW are called the Antarctic Slope Front.

The CDW also plays an important role in supporting Antarctic ecosystems. Upwelling of the CDW onto the Antarctic continental shelves brings heat and nutrients that support ecosystems along the west Antarctic Peninsula.
