= Thermohaline circulation =

Part of large-scale ocean circulation

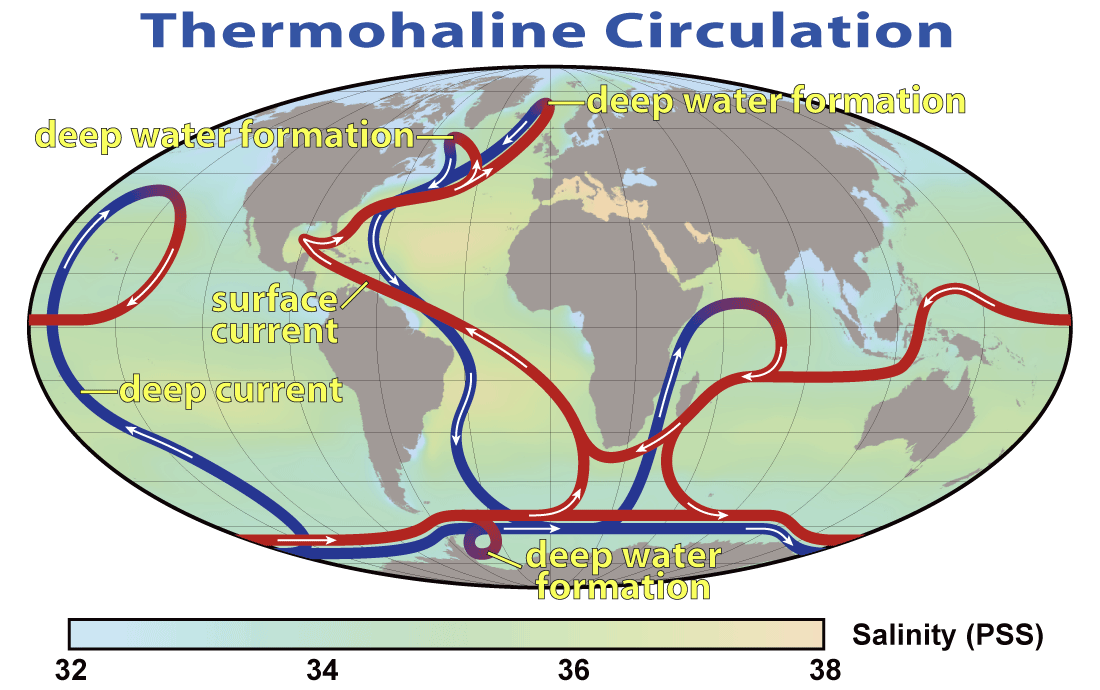
A summary of the path of the thermohaline circulation. Blue paths represent deep-water currents, while red paths represent surface currents.

Thermohaline circulation

Thermohaline circulation (THC) is a part of the large-scale ocean circulation driven by global density gradients formed by surface heat and freshwater fluxes. The name thermohaline is derived from thermo-, referring to temperature, and haline, referring to salt content—factors which together determine the density of sea water.

Wind-driven surface currents (such as the Gulf Stream) travel polewards from the equatorial Atlantic Ocean, cooling and sinking en-route to higher latitudes – eventually becoming part of the North Atlantic Deep Water – before flowing into the ocean basins. While the bulk of thermohaline water upwells in the Southern Ocean, the oldest waters (with a transit time of approximately 1000 years) upwell in the North Pacific; extensive mixing takes place between the ocean basins, reducing the difference in their densities, forming the Earth's oceans a global system. The water in these circuits transport energy (as heat) and mass (as dissolved solids and gases) around the globe. Consequently, the state of the circulation greatly impacts the climate of Earth.

The thermohaline circulation is often referred to as the ocean conveyor belt, great ocean conveyor, or "global conveyor belt" – a term coined by climate scientist Wallace Smith Broecker. It is also known as the meridional overturning circulation, or MOC; a name used to signify that circulation patterns caused by temperature and salinity gradients are not necessarily part of a single global circulation. This is due, in part, to the difficulty in separating parts of the circulation driven by temperature and salinity from those affected by factors such as wind and tidal force.

This global circulation comprises two major "limbs;" the Atlantic meridional overturning circulation (AMOC) centered in the north Atlantic Ocean, and the Southern Ocean overturning circulation, or Southern Ocean meridional circulation (SMOC) located near Antarctica. Since 90% of the human population occupies the Northern Hemisphere, more extensive research has been undertaken on the AMOC, however the SMOC is of equal importance to the global climate. Evidence suggests both circulations are slowing due to climate change in line with increasing rates of dilution from melting ice sheets – critically affecting the salinity of Antarctic bottom water. In addition, the potential for outright collapse of either circulation to a much weaker state exemplifies tipping points in the climate system. If either hemisphere experiences collapse of its circulation, the likelihood of prolonged dry spells and droughts would increase as precipitation decreases, while the other hemisphere will become wetter. Marine ecosystems are then more likely to receive fewer nutrients and experience greater ocean deoxygenation. In the Northern Hemisphere, the collapse of AMOC would lead to substantially lower temperatures in many European countries, while the east coast of North America is predicted to see accelerated sea level rise. The collapse of these circulations is generally accepted to be more than a century away, and may only occur in the event of rapid and high sea-temperature increases. However, these projections are marked by significant uncertainty.

== History of research ==
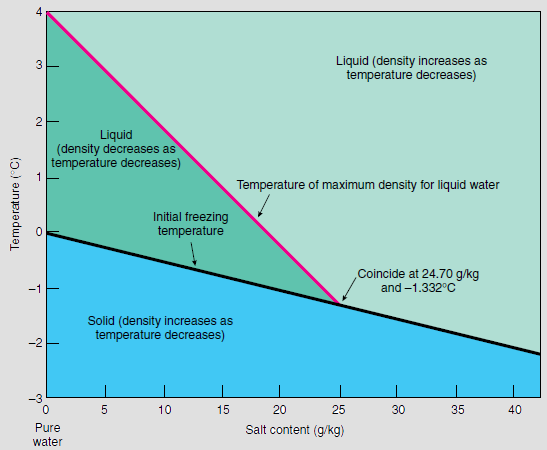
Effect of temperature and salinity upon sea water density maximum and sea water freezing temperature

It has long been known that wind drives ocean currents, but only at the surface. In the 19th century, some oceanographers suggested that the convection of heat could drive deeper currents. In 1908, Johan Sandström performed a series of experiments at a Bornö Marine Research Station which proved that the currents driven by thermal energy transfer can exist, but require that "heating occurs at a greater depth than cooling". Normally, the opposite occurs, because ocean water is heated from above by the Sun and becomes less dense, so the surface layer floats on the surface above the cooler, denser layers, resulting in ocean stratification. However, wind and tides cause mixing between these water layers, with diapycnal mixing caused by tidal currents being one example. This mixing is what enables the convection between ocean layers, and thus, deep water currents.

In the 1920s, Sandström's framework was expanded by accounting for the role of salinity in ocean layer formation. Salinity is important because like temperature, it affects water density. Water becomes less dense as its temperature increases and the distance between its molecules expands, but more dense as the salinity increases, since there is a larger mass of salts dissolved within that water. Further, while fresh water is at its most dense at 4 °C, seawater only gets denser as it cools, up until it reaches the freezing point. That freezing point is also lower than for fresh water due to salinity, and can be below −2 °C, depending on salinity and pressure.

== Structure ==
The global conveyor belt on a continuous-ocean map (animation)

These density differences caused by temperature and salinity ultimately separate ocean water into distinct water masses, such as the North Atlantic Deep Water (NADW) and Antarctic Bottom Water (AABW). These two waters are the main drivers of the circulation, which was established in 1960 by Henry Stommel and Arnold B. Arons. They have chemical, temperature and isotopic ratio signatures (such as ^{231}Pa / ^{230}Th ratios) which can be traced, their flow rate calculated, and their age determined. NADW is formed because North Atlantic is a rare place in the ocean where precipitation, which adds fresh water to the ocean and so reduces its salinity, is outweighed by evaporation, in part due to high windiness. When water evaporates, it leaves salt behind, and so the surface waters of the North Atlantic are particularly salty. North Atlantic is also an already cool region, and evaporative cooling reduces water temperature even further. Thus, this water sinks downward in the Norwegian Sea, fills the Arctic Ocean Basin and spills southwards through the Greenland-Scotland-Ridge – crevasses in the submarine sills that connect Greenland, Iceland and Great Britain. It cannot flow towards the Pacific Ocean due to the narrow shallows of the Bering Strait, but it does slowly flow into the deep abyssal plains of the south Atlantic.

In the Southern Ocean, strong katabatic winds blowing from the Antarctic continent onto the ice shelves will blow the newly formed sea ice away, opening polynyas in locations such as Weddell and Ross Seas, off the Adélie Coast and by Cape Darnley. The ocean, no longer protected by sea ice, suffers a brutal and strong cooling (see polynya). Meanwhile, sea ice starts reforming, so the surface waters also get saltier, hence very dense. In fact, the formation of sea ice contributes to an increase in surface seawater salinity; saltier brine is left behind as the sea ice forms around it (pure water preferentially being frozen). Increasing salinity lowers the freezing point of seawater, so cold liquid brine is formed in inclusions within a honeycomb of ice. The brine progressively melts the ice just beneath it, eventually dripping out of the ice matrix and sinking. This process is known as brine rejection. The resulting Antarctic bottom water sinks and flows north and east. It is denser than the NADW, and so flows beneath it. AABW formed in the Weddell Sea will mainly fill the Atlantic and Indian Basins, whereas the AABW formed in the Ross Sea will flow towards the Pacific Ocean. At the Indian Ocean, a vertical exchange of a lower layer of cold and salty water from the Atlantic and the warmer and fresher upper ocean water from the tropical Pacific occurs, in what is known as overturning. In the Pacific Ocean, the rest of the cold and salty water from the Atlantic undergoes haline forcing, and becomes warmer and fresher more quickly.

Surface water flows north and sinks in the dense ocean near Iceland and Greenland. It joins the global thermohaline circulation into the Indian Ocean, and the Antarctic Circumpolar Current.

The out-flowing undersea of cold and salty water makes the sea level of the Atlantic slightly lower than the Pacific and salinity or halinity of water at the Atlantic higher than the Pacific. This generates a large but slow flow of warmer and fresher upper ocean water from the tropical Pacific to the Indian Ocean through the Indonesian Archipelago to replace the cold and salty Antarctic Bottom Water. This is also known as 'haline forcing' (net high latitude freshwater gain and low latitude evaporation). This warmer, fresher water from the Pacific flows up through the South Atlantic to Greenland, where it cools off and undergoes evaporative cooling and sinks to the ocean floor, providing a continuous thermohaline circulation.

== Upwelling ==
As the deep waters sink into the ocean basins, they displace the older deep-water masses, which gradually become less dense due to continued ocean mixing. Thus, some water is rising, in what is known as upwelling. Its speeds are very slow even compared to the movement of the bottom water masses. It is therefore difficult to measure where upwelling occurs using current speeds, given all the other wind-driven processes going on in the surface ocean. Deep waters have their own chemical signature, formed from the breakdown of particulate matter falling into them over the course of their long journey at depth. A number of scientists have tried to use these tracers to infer where the upwelling occurs. Wallace Broecker, using box models, has asserted that the bulk of deep upwelling occurs in the North Pacific, using as evidence the high values of silicon found in these waters. Other investigators have not found such clear evidence.

Computer models of ocean circulation increasingly place most of the deep upwelling in the Southern Ocean, associated with the strong winds in the open latitudes between South America and Antarctica. Direct estimates of the strength of the thermohaline circulation have also been made at 26.5°N in the North Atlantic, by the UK-US RAPID programme. It combines direct estimates of ocean transport using current meters and subsea cable measurements with estimates of the geostrophic current from temperature and salinity measurements to provide continuous, full-depth, basin-wide estimates of the meridional overturning circulation. However, it has only been operating since 2004, which is too short when the timescale of the circulation is measured in centuries.

== Effects on global climate ==
The thermohaline circulation plays an important role in supplying heat to the polar regions, and thus in regulating the amount of sea ice in these regions, although poleward heat transport outside the tropics is considerably larger in the atmosphere than in the ocean. Changes in the thermohaline circulation are thought to have significant impacts on the Earth's radiation budget.

Large influxes of low-density meltwater from Lake Agassiz and deglaciation in North America are thought to have led to a shifting of deep water formation and subsidence in the extreme North Atlantic and caused the climate period in Europe known as the Younger Dryas.

=== Slowdown or collapse of AMOC ===
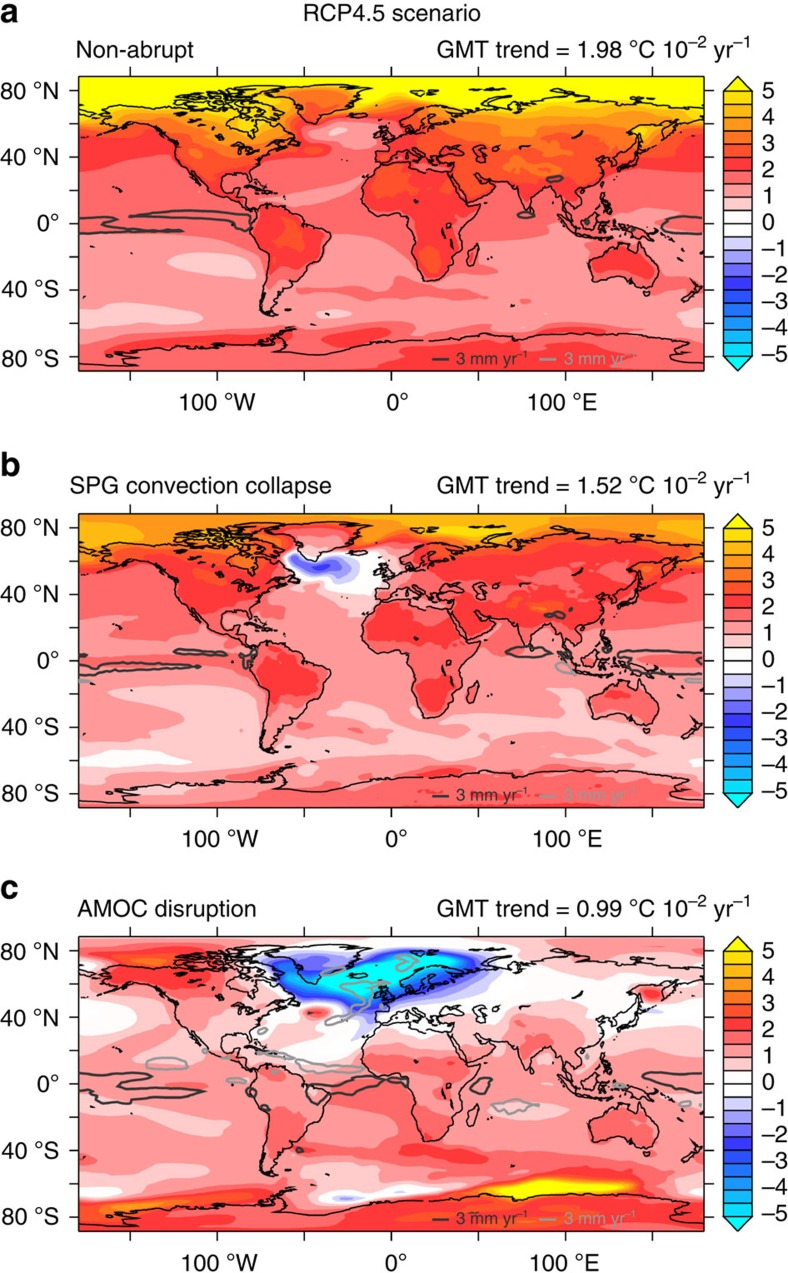
Modelled 21st century warming under the "intermediate" global warming scenario (top). The potential collapse of the subpolar gyre in this scenario (middle). The collapse of the entire Atlantic Meridional Overturning Circulation (bottom).

In 2021, the IPCC Sixth Assessment Report again said the AMOC is "very likely" to decline within the 21st century and that there was a "high confidence" changes to it would be reversible within centuries if warming was reversed. Unlike the Fifth Assessment Report, it had only "medium confidence" rather than "high confidence" in the AMOC avoiding a collapse before the end of the 21st century. This reduction in confidence was likely influenced by several review studies that draw attention to the circulation stability bias within general circulation models, and simplified ocean-modelling studies suggesting the AMOC may be more vulnerable to abrupt change than larger-scale models suggest.

The synthesis report of the IPCC Sixth Assessment Report summarized the scientific consensus as follows: "The Atlantic Meridional Overturning Circulation is very likely to weaken over the 21st century for all considered scenarios (high confidence), however an abrupt collapse is not expected before 2100 (medium confidence). If such a low probability event were to occur, it would very likely cause abrupt shifts in regional weather patterns and water cycle, such as a southward shift in the tropical rain belt, and large impacts on ecosystems and human activities."

As of 2024, there is no consensus on whether a consistent slowing of the AMOC circulation has occurred but there is little doubt it will occur in the event of continued climate change. According to the IPCC, the most-likely effects of future AMOC decline are reduced precipitation in mid-latitudes, changing patterns of strong precipitation in the tropics and Europe, and strengthening storms that follow the North Atlantic track. In 2020, research found a weakened AMOC would slow the decline in Arctic sea ice and result in atmospheric trends similar to those that likely occurred during the Younger Dryas, such as a southward displacement of Intertropical Convergence Zone. Changes in precipitation under high-emissions scenarios would be far larger.

A decline in the AMOC would be accompanied by an acceleration of sea level rise along the U.S. East Coast; at least one such event has been connected to a temporary slowing of the AMOC. This effect would be caused by increased warming and thermal expansion of coastal waters, which would transfer less of their heat toward Europe; it is one of the reasons sea level rise along the U.S. East Coast is estimated to be three-to-four times higher than the global average.

=== Slowdown or collapse of SMOC ===
Additionally, the main controlling pattern of the extratropical Southern Hemisphere's climate is the Southern Annular Mode (SAM), which has been spending more and more years in its positive phase due to climate change (as well as the aftermath of ozone depletion), which means more warming and more precipitation over the ocean due to stronger westerlies, freshening the Southern Ocean further. Climate models currently disagree on whether the Southern Ocean circulation would continue to respond to changes in SAM the way it does now, or if it will eventually adjust to them. As of early 2020s, their best, limited-confidence estimate is that the lower cell would continue to weaken, while the upper cell may strengthen by around 20% over the 21st century. A key reason for the uncertainty is the poor and inconsistent representation of ocean stratification in even the CMIP6 models – the most advanced generation available as of early 2020s. Furthermore, the largest long-term role in the state of the circulation is played by Antarctic meltwater, and Antarctic ice loss had been the least-certain aspect of future sea level rise projections for a long time.

Similar processes are taking place with Atlantic meridional overturning circulation (AMOC), which is also affected by the ocean warming and by meltwater flows from the declining Greenland ice sheet. It is possible that both circulations may not simply continue to weaken in response to increased warming and freshening, but eventually collapse to a much weaker state outright, in a way which would be difficult to reverse and constitute an example of tipping points in the climate system. There is paleoclimate evidence for the overturning circulation being substantially weaker than now during past periods that were both warmer and colder than now. However, Southern Hemisphere is only inhabited by 10% of the world's population, and the Southern Ocean overturning circulation has historically received much less attention than the AMOC. Consequently, while multiple studies have set out to estimate the exact level of global warming which could result in AMOC collapsing, the timeframe over which such collapse may occur, and the regional impacts it would cause, much less equivalent research exists for the Southern Ocean overturning circulation as of the early 2020s. There has been a suggestion that its collapse may occur between 1.7 °C (3.1 °F) and 3 °C (5.4 °F), but this estimate is much less certain than for many other tipping points.

== See also ==
- Atlantic multidecadal oscillation – Climate cycle that affects the surface temperature of the North Atlantic
- Brunt-Väisälä frequency – Measure of fluid stability against vertical displacement
- Contourite – Sedimentary deposit produced by thermohaline-induced deepwater bottom currents
- Downwelling – Downwards movement of one fluid within another
- Halothermal circulation – Part of large-scale ocean circulation
- Hydrothermal circulation – Circulation of water driven by heat exchange
- Temperature-salinity diagram – Diagrams used to identify water masses

== Other sources ==
- Apel, JR (1987). Principles of Ocean Physics. Academic Press. ISBN 0-12-058866-8.
- Gnanadesikan, A.; R. D. Slater; P. S. Swathi; G. K. Vallis (2005). "The energetics of ocean heat transport". Journal of Climate. 18 (14): 2604–16. Bibcode:2005JCli...18.2604G. doi:10.1175/JCLI3436.1.
- Knauss, JA (1996). Introduction to Physical Oceanography. Prentice Hall. ISBN 0-13-238155-9.
