= T-S diagram =

A T-S diagram may refer to:

- a temperature salinity diagram;
- a temperature-entropy diagram;
- a Tanabe–Sugano diagram.
