= Brine rejection =

Process by which salts are expelled from freezing water

Brine rejection is a process that occurs when salty water freezes. The salts do not fit in the crystal structure of water ice, so the salt is expelled.

Since the oceans are salty, this process is important in nature. Salt rejected by the forming sea ice drains into the surrounding seawater, creating saltier, denser brine. The denser brine sinks, influencing ocean circulation.

== Formation ==
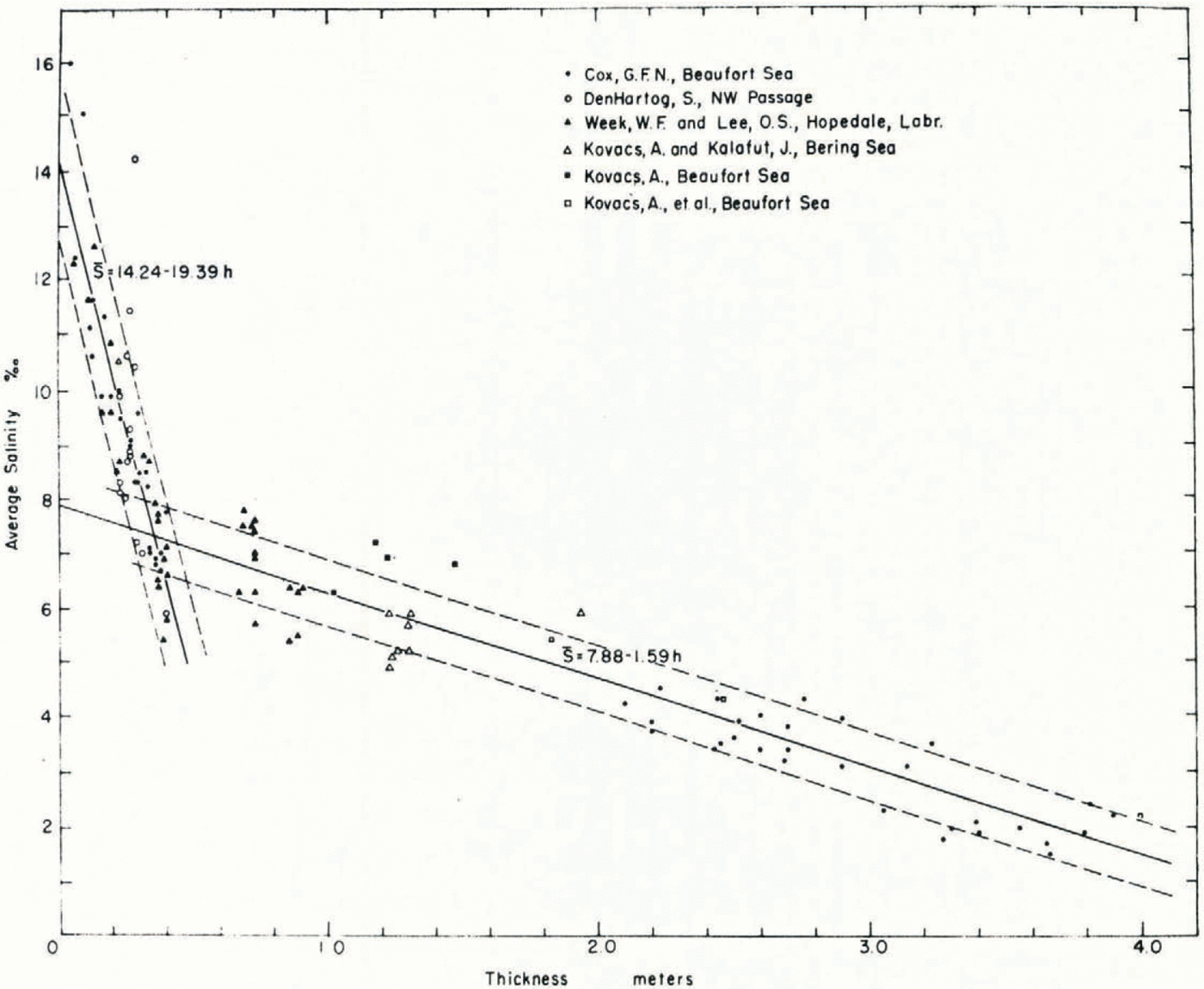
Average salinity of sea ice as a function of ice thickness for cold sea ice sampled during the growth season. The standard error of the estimate is 1.5‰ for thin ice and 0.6‰ for thick ice.

As water reaches the temperature where it begins to crystallize and form ice, salt ions are rejected from the lattices within the ice and are either forced out into the surrounding water, or trapped among the ice crystals in pockets called brine cells. Generally, sea ice has a salinity ranging from 0 psu at the surface to 4 psu at the base. The faster that this freezing process occurs, the more brine cells are left in the ice. Once the ice reaches a critical thickness, roughly 15 cm, the concentration of salt ions in the liquid around the ice begins to increase, as leftover brine is rejected from the cells. This increase is associated with the appearance of strong convective plumes, which flow from channels and within the ice and carry a significant salt flux. The brine that drains from the newly-formed ice is replaced by a weak flow of relatively fresh water from the liquid region below it. The new water partially freezes within the pores of the ice, increasing the solidity of the ice.

As sea ice ages and thickens, the initial salinity of the ice decreases due to the rejection of brine over time. While the sea ice ages, desalinization occurs to such a degree that some multiyear ice has a salinity of less than 1 PSU. This occurs in three different ways:

- solute diffusion: this depends on the fact that brine inclusions trapped in ice will begin to migrate toward the warmer end of the ice block. The ice block is warmest at the water-ice interface, thus pushing the brine out into the water surrounding the ice.
- gravity drainage: gravity drainage involves the movement of brine due to differences in density between brine in the interior of the ice and brine in the seawater outside of the ice, which occurs due to the development of a buoyancy-driven convection system.
- expulsion: the migration of brine due to cracking produced by thermal expansion of the ice, or pressure caused by the increased volume of the newly formed ice.

== Role in deep water formation and thermohaline circulation ==
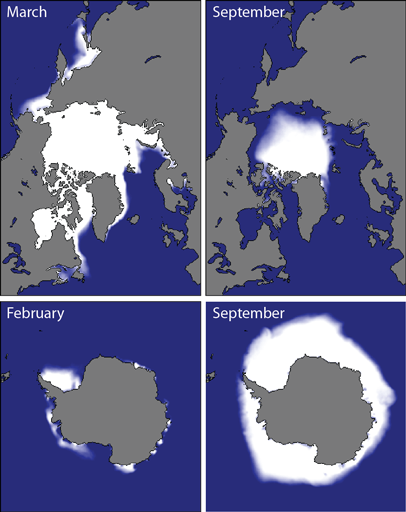
Arctic and Antarctic sea ice concentration climatology from 1981 to 2010, at the approximate seasonal maximum and minimum levels based on passive microwave satellite data.

Brine rejection occurs in the sea ice packs around at the north and south poles of the Earth. The Arctic Ocean has historically ranged from roughly 14-16 million square kilometers in late winter to roughly 7 million km^{2} each September. The annual increase of ice plays a major role in the movement of ocean circulation and deep water formation. The density of the water below the newly-formed ice increases due to brine rejection. Saltier water can also become colder without freezing.

The dense water that forms in the Arctic are called North Atlantic Deep Water (NADW), while the Antarctic Bottom Water (AABW) forms in the southern hemisphere. These two areas of brine rejection play an important role in the thermohaline circulation of all of Earth's oceans.

== Brinicles ==
As sea ice freezes, it rejects increasingly salty water, which drains through narrow brine channels that thread through the ice. The brine flowing through the brine channels and out of the bottom of the ice is very cold and salty, so it sinks in the warmer, fresher seawater under the ice, forming a plume. The plume is colder than the freezing point of sea water under the ice, so the seawater can freeze where it touches the plume. Ice freezing around the edges of the plume gradually builds a hollow icicle-like tube, called a brinicle. These frozen stalactite-like forms are fragile during early stages, but if brine drainage ceases, they may freeze solid. In calm waters, brinicles can reach the sea floor, freezing it fairly abruptly.

== Climate change ==
The deep ocean basins are stably stratified, so mixing of surface waters with the deep ocean waters occurs only very slowly. The dissolved CO_{2} of the surface waters of the ocean is roughly in equilibrium with the partial pressure of CO_{2} in the atmosphere. As atmospheric CO_{2} levels are rising, the oceans are absorbing some CO_{2} from the atmosphere. When surface waters sink, they carry considerable amounts of CO_{2} into the deep oceans, away from the atmosphere. Because these waters are able to contain a large amount of CO_{2}, they have helped slow the rise in atmospheric CO_{2} concentrations, thus slowing some aspects of climate change.

Climate change could have different effects on ice melt and brine rejection. Previous studies have suggested that as ice cover thins, it will become a weaker insulator, resulting in larger ice production during the autumn and winter. The consequent increase in winter brine rejection will drive ocean ventilation and strengthen the inflow of warm Atlantic waters. Studies of the last glacial maximum have indicated that a drastic reduction in the production of sea ice, and thus reduction of brine rejection, would result in the weakening of the stratification in the global deep oceans and in CO_{2} release into the shallow oceans and the atmosphere, triggering global deglaciation.

== Life in channels and surrounding waters ==
Life in sea ice is energetically demanding, and sets limits at any hierarchical, organizational, and organismic level, ranging from molecules to everything that an organism does. Despite this fact, the brine-containing interstices and pockets found in sea ice host a variety of organisms, including bacteria, autotrophic and heterotrophic protists, microalgae, and metazoa.

== Brine rejection and the North Pacific Intermediate Water ==
Brine rejection plays a crucial role in ocean circulation. In coastal polynyas, it is the key to the ventilation of multiple water masses across both the Arctic and Antarctic. A coastal polynya is an area of open water surrounded by ice. The reason that coastal polynyas are the most active areas of brine rejection is that these waters often see offshore winds which give the water direct contact with cold air. This leads to heat loss and ice production. One area that is commonly studied to look at these impacts is the coastal polynyas of the Okhotsk Sea. The Okhotsk Sea has wide, shallow shelves, severe wintertime conditions, high background salinity, and easy summertime access, making it an ideal study location. There have been many studies done that look at the influence of brine rejection in the Okhotsk Sea.

In a paper done by Shcherbina et al. (2003), they analyze the influence of brine rejection well. Within the Okhotsk Sea, circulation is driven by the brine rejection that occurs in the winter months. As is typical for the rejection of brine, sea ice develops that is 70-90% fresher than seawater. The water underneath becomes saltier and colder, leading to an increase in density. This parcel of water in the Okhotsk Sea is referred to as dense shelf water (DSW). The saltier and colder a water parcel is, the denser it becomes, causing it to sink below other parcels of water. For this reason, the DSW will begin to sink within the water column. The parcel then moves southward along the coast of Sakhalin. From here, the water moves over into the Pacific and ventilates the North Pacific Intermediate Water (NPIW). The NPIW is known to be the densest water in the North Pacific, and it is a key water mass in ocean circulation.

Brine rejection has been shown to ventilate the North Pacific Ocean to a depth of 300-1,000 meters. Some studies have even shown it reaching mixing depths of 2,000 meters. The mixing and ventilation of the water column is key in helping to replenish the oxygen within intermediate waters. It can also lead to an upwelling of nutrients, which can influence productivity. An increase in primary production can lead to an increase in other organisms from krill to whales.
