= Romanche Trench =

Trench in the Atlantic formed by the Romanche fracture zone on the Mid-Atlantic Ridge

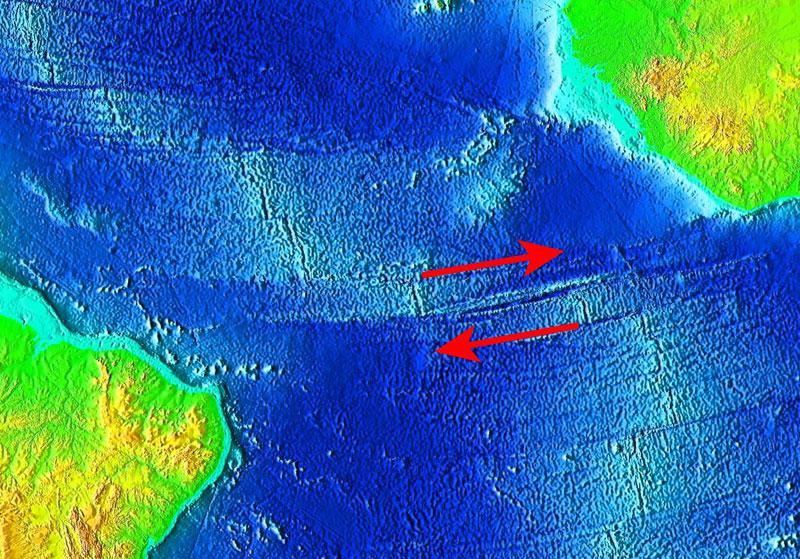
The Romanche Trench with red arrows indicating directions of movements of tectonic plates

The Romanche Trench, also called the Romanche Furrow or Romanche Gap, is the third-deepest of the major trenches of the Atlantic Ocean, after the Puerto Rico Trench and the South Sandwich Trench. It bisects the Mid-Atlantic Ridge (MAR) just north of the equator at the narrowest part of the Atlantic between Brazil and West Africa, extending from 2°N to 2°S and from 16°W to 20°W. The trench has been formed by the actions of the Romanche Fracture Zone, a portion of which is an active transform boundary offsetting sections of the Mid-Atlantic Ridge.

It was named after the French navy ship La Romanche, commanded by captain Louis-Ferdinand Martial which on 11 October 1883 made soundings that revealed the trench. The boat was returning to France after spending a few months on a scientific mission near Cape Horn as part of the first International Polar Year.

== Oceanography ==
The trench has a depth of 7,761 m (25,463 ft), is 300 km (190 mi) long, has an average width of 19 km (12 mi), and allows for a major circulation of deep-ocean-basin water from the west Atlantic to the east Atlantic basins. Deep water flow through the trench is from west to east with a rate of 3.6 Sverdrups (million m^{3}/s) of 1.57 °C (34.83 °F) water.

Lower North Atlantic Deep Water (LNADW) is found around 3,600–4,000 metres (11,800–13,100 ft) below sea level and flows from the Greenland and Norwegian seas; it brings high salinity, oxygen, and freon concentrations towards the equator. Antarctic Bottom Water (AABW) flows below the LNADW and reaches down to the seafloor. Formed around Antarctica, the AABW is cold, has low salinity, and high silicate concentration. As it flows north, it is constrained by numerous obstacles on the seafloor. In the basin on the eastern side of the MAR the Walvis Ridge blocks the northward passage. For LNADW and AABW, the Romanche and Chain fracture zones (just south of the equator) are the only deep passages in the MAR where interbasin exchange is possible. As AABW flows through the Romanche Fracture Zone, salinity and temperature increase significantly.

== Geology ==
The Romanche Fracture Zone offsets the Mid-Atlantic ridge by 900 km (560 mi), making it the largest equatorial fracture zone in the Atlantic. According to the normal scenario for the opening of the South Atlantic, it is spreading at a rate of 1.75 cm/year (0.69 in/year) and began forming about 50 Ma. North of and parallel to the fracture zone is a transverse ridge which is particularly prominent over hundreds of kilometers east and west of the MAB of the South Atlantic. The western part of the transverse ridge consists of fragments of uplifted oceanic crust and upper mantle. The summit of the transverse ridge is capped by Miocene shallow-water limestones that reached above sea level 20 Ma before subsiding abnormally fast. The eastern part of the transverse ridge, however, consists of a thick sequence of stratified material called the Romanche Sedimentary Sequence (RSS). The RSS includes pelagic material from the early Cretaceous (140 Ma) which, coupled with the thickness of the sequence, does not fit with the normal scenario for the opening of the South Atlantic around the Aptian-Albian (125–100 Ma). The transverse ridge separates the present trench from an 800 km (500 mi)-long aseismic valley where the Romanche transform was located until about 10–8 Ma. This transform migration was preceded by a process 25–17 Ma during which the Miocene shallow-water platform mentioned above reached sea level as the transverse ridge was first uplifted, then deformed, and finally buried under the sea.

== Biological role ==
The hydrothermal vents of the MAR support many life forms. The Romanche and Chain Fracture Zones create a huge gap in the MAR and can act as a "Subsea Berlin Wall" segregating the North Atlantic communities from those in other oceans. Swarms of hydrothermal shrimps reminiscent of those found from northern MAR vent-sites have been found on the northern part of the southern MAR. Bivalve communities have been reported around vents further south. These species await a formal description, and it is not known whether they represent communities distinct from those on the northern MAR. The flow of NADW through the Romanche and Chain Fracture Zones may serve as a conduit for larval transport from the western North Atlantic to the eastern South Atlantic. For example, the caridean shrimp Alvinocaris muricola inhabits cold seeps in both the Gulf of Mexico and the Gulf of Guinea, which clearly suggests a gene flow across the Atlantic, but the amount of data is very limited and dispersal pathways are not fully understood.
