= Bjerkø Peninsula =

Peninsula in Mac.Robertson Land, Antarctica

Coordinates: 67°50′S 69°30′E

Bjerkø Peninsula is a broad ice-covered peninsula of Antarctica, forming the west shore of MacKenzie Bay. Norwegian whalers explored this area in January and February 1931, naming the cape at the end of this peninsula for gunner Reidar Bjerkø of the whale catcher Bouvet II, from whose deck the coast was sketched on January 19. Since Sir Douglas Mawson probably saw this cape from a great distance as early as December 26, 1929, the Australian name of Cape Darnley has been retained for the cape, while the Norwegian name has been applied to the peninsula.
