= Water mass =

Body of water with common formation history

An example of different water masses in the Southern Ocean.

An oceanographic water mass is an identifiable body of water with a common formation history which has physical properties distinct from surrounding water. Properties include temperature, salinity, chemical - isotopic ratios, and other physical quantities which are conservative flow tracers. Water mass is also identified by its non-conservative flow tracers such as silicate, nitrate, oxygen, and phosphate.

Water masses are generally distinguished not only by their respective tracers but also by their location in the Worlds' oceans. Water masses are also distinguished by their vertical position so that there are surface water masses, intermediate water masses and deep water masses.

== Global water masses ==
Common water masses in the world ocean are:

- Antarctic Bottom Water (AABW): Antarctic Bottom Water is a very important water mass. Antarctic Bottom Water is the left over part when sea ice is being made. It is very cold but, not quite freezing so the water moves down and along the ocean floor.
- North Atlantic Deep Water (NADW)
- Circumpolar Deep Water (CDW)
- Antarctic Intermediate Water (AAIW)
- Subantarctic Mode Water (SAMW)
- Arctic Intermediate Water (AIW)
- North Pacific Intermediate Water (NPIW)
- The central waters of various oceanic basins
- Various ocean surface waters.

== Characteristics of water masses ==
Although there are many types of water masses, they all share characteristics. Water Masses are formed from regions of water having different temperatures. When ice is being formed in a cold climate like Antarctica, the cold temperatures separate the molecular bonds of the water causing it to become less dense. However, because water increases its volume by about 9% when frozen, this makes the ice less dense than the water which is why glaciers float. This also in turn causes the salinity of the water to decrease. The salinity of the water makes water freeze at lower temperatures than freshwater. Freshwater freezes at the standard 0 °C (32 °F), while saltwater freezes at an average of -2 °C (28.4 °F).

== Water mass classification ==
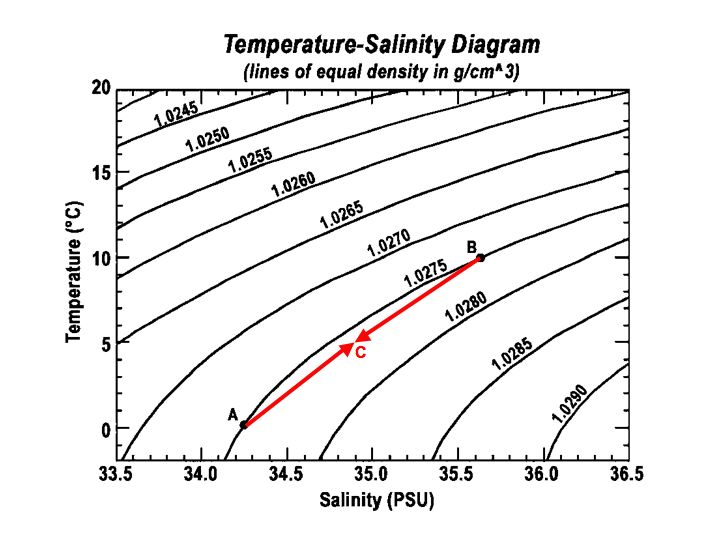
Temperature and salinity diagram

=== Temperature and salinity diagram ===
The best method of classifying a water mass is through using a T-S diagram. In the diagram pictured at the top, it categorises a water mass by the temperature and salinity of the water and is represented by a single point. However, water masses are not constant. Throughout time climates can change, seasons can drag out, or there could be less rainfall meaning that the water masses might change in temperature or salinity. To have a complete water mass classification, it requires the water type of the source and the standard deviations of the temperature and salinity. It can take many years to establish the standard deviations of the water mass and requires constant surveillance. Once all of the necessary measures are completed, the data will now determine what the current density of the water is and help further classify the water mass.

== See also ==
- Atlantic meridional overturning circulation
- Ocean current
- Open ocean convection
- Ocean stratification
- Temperature-salinity diagram
- Thermohaline circulation
- Upwelling
