= North Pacific Intermediate Water =

Cold oceanic water mass that originates east of Japan

North Pacific Intermediate Water (NPIW) is cold, moderately low salinity water mass that originates in the mixed water region (MWR) between the Kuroshio and Oyashio waters just east of Japan. Examination of NPIW at stations just east of the MWR indicates that the mixed waters in the MWR are the origin of the newest NPIW. The new NPIW ‘‘formed’’ in the MWR is a mixture of relatively fresh, recently ventilated Oyashio water coming from the subpolar gyre, and more saline, older Kuroshio water. The mixing process results in a salinity minimum and also in rejuvenation of the NPIW layer in the subtropical gyre due to the Oyashio input.

== Properties and Formation ==
The North Pacific Intermediate Water is a well-defined salinity minimum, located in the North Pacific subtropical gyre. It occurs at a depth range of 300-800 meters and is confined to a narrow density range. NPIW forms when low-salinity, high-oxygen subpolar water is overrun by warm, saline subtropical waters. The NPIW occurs where the cold, low-saline Oyashio and warm, saline Kuroshio currents meet. The Oyashio water is freshened in the Okhotsk Sea and transported to the North Pacific subtropical gyre by thermohaline circulation. Some studies have found that Gulf of Alaska Intermediate Water additionally contributes to the subpolar waters on the eastern side of the gyre.

The density of the NPIW in the MWR, about 26.6 – 26.9 σ_{θ}, is slightly higher than the apparent late winter surface density of the subpolar water. The low salinity and high oxygen at the density of the NPIW are attained in the subpolar gyre, through vertical diffusion in the open North Pacific and direct ventilation in the Okhotsk Sea as a result of sea ice formation.

According to recent studies, the NPIW is formed along three paths between the Kuroshio Extension and the subarctic front. The formation time scale is estimated to be 1 – 1.5 years based on observations by floating instruments and the residence time of NPIW is estimated to be about 20 years. Since the formation time is much less than the residence time, the properties of the NPIW may change on an annual basis as a result of the large changes in the Oyashio transport.
