= Subantarctic Mode Water =

Water mass formed near the Sub-Antarctic Front

Sub-Antarctic Mode Water (SAMW) is an important water mass in Earth's oceans. It is formed near the Sub-Antarctic Front on the northern flank of the Antarctic Circumpolar Current. The surface density of Sub-Antarctic Mode Water ranges between about 1026.0 and 1027.0 kg/m^{3}, and the core of this water mass is often identified as a region of particularly low stratification.

Another important facet of SAMW is that silicate (an important nutrient for diatoms) is depleted relative to nitrate. This depletion can be tracked over much of the globe, suggesting that SAMW helps set the blend of nutrients delivered to low-latitude ocean ecosystems and thus determines the balance of species within these ecosystems.

SAMW is a very homogeneous layer that forms north of the Sub-Antarctic Front and is also referred to as a pycnostad. Its uniformity can be attributed to convective overturning that also serves to ventilate it, resulting in the high dissolved oxygen value of >6mL/L.

It has slightly less dissolved oxygen than the surface water layer above it, but greater dissolved oxygen than the water masses below it. It has some variability in temperature, salinity and density in the Pacific Ocean. From west to east, the density increases from 1026.9 kg/m^{3} to 1027.1 kg/m^{3}, the temperature decreases from 8.5 °C to 5.5 °C, and the salinity decreases from 34.62 ppt to 34.25 ppt (psu) In the region where the Peru-Chile Undercurrent flows above the SAMW, the SAMW can be distinguished as having locally-characteristic low phosphorus, silicate and other nutrient concentrations in comparison. It moves by the transference of heat energy via the Subtropical anticyclonic gyre and retains its individuality as differentiated with the less-salty Antarctic Intermediate Water below it and the more highly oxygenated surface water above it. The oxygen maximum portion of SAMW sinks at 28˚S to 700m and lifts back to 500m around 15˚S after oxygen levels decreased.

SAMW acts as an oxygenator for mid oceanic depths in the Southern oceans. Near the surface it picks up atmospheric oxygen and carbon dioxide and then sinks, or subducts near the Indian Ocean, contributing to the Indian subtropical gyre and cooling and contributing to the Antarctic Circumpolar Current (ACC).

== Impact of climate change ==
The Sub-Antarctic Mode Water acts as a carbon sink, absorbing atmospheric carbon dioxide and storing it in solution. In the event of global heating due to climate change, the amount of carbon dioxide that the SAMW is able to absorb will lessen. Downes et al. (2009) found that through climate modeling, in the event of a doubling of atmospheric carbon dioxide concentration the Subantarctic Mode water will decrease in density and salinity.

Salinity (colors) and temperature (contours) at 50E, illustrating the low stratification layer associated with the Subantarctic Mode Water at this longitude.

Salinity (colors) and temperature (contours) at 170W, showing that the SAMW is much closer in temperature to the salinity minimum associated with the Antarctic Intermediate Water.
