= Arctic Intermediate Water =

The Arctic Intermediate Water (AIW) is a water mass found between the top cold, relatively fresh polar water and the bottom deep water in the Arctic domain (bounded by the polar and arctic fronts). AIW is formed in small quantities compared to other water masses, and has limited influence outside of the Arctic domain.

== Characteristics ==
Two types of AIW are found, which are lower AIW and upper AIW separately. Lower AIW is the water mass with temperature and salinity maximum found at 250~400m deep, right above the deep water, with temperature for lower AIW ranges from 0 to 3 °C and salinity greater than 34.9.

Upper AIW is defined to be a denser layer on top of the lower AIW, between surface cold water and the lower AIW, including water masses with temperature maximum to minimum. It is characterized by temperatures less than 2 °C in the salinity ranges from 34.7 to 34.9. The upper AIW is usually found at 75~150m, overlain by Arctic Surface Water (ASW). However, it could be found at the sea surface in winter.

There are overlaps in density for upper and lower AIW according to their definitions. It is possible that water mass falling within the definition of upper AIW is below the defined lower AIW. For example, in Norwegian Sea, one intermediate layer of salinity slightly less than 34.9 was found below the water mass with temperature and salinity maximum.

== Formation ==
It is generally accepted that AIW is formed and modified in the north part of Arctic domain. As AIW moves from north to south along the Greenland continental slope, its temperature and salinity, on the whole, decrease southwards due to mixing with surface cold water. The lower AIW is produced by the cooling and sinking of Atlantic Water (AW), which is traditionally defined with salinity greater than 35, and by the Polar Intermediate Water (PIW) that is colder than 0 °C with salinity in the range 34.4-34.7.

== Seasonal variations ==
Amount of AIW varies with different seasons. For example, the upper AIW in Iceland sea increased from about 10% of the total volume in fall to over 21% in winter. In the same time, both ASW and lower AIW show significant summer-to-winter decreases, which might contribute to the new upper AIW. Similar process can also be found in Greenland sea, but with a smaller amount of formed upper AIW.
