= Cape Darnley (Mac. Robertson Land) =

Headland of Antarctica

Cape Darnley is the ice-covered cape forming the northern extremity of Bjerkø Peninsula at the west side of MacKenzie Bay. On December 26, 1929, Sir Douglas Mawson, from the masthead of the RRS Discovery while at 66°57′S 71°57′E, saw land miraged up on the southwest horizon. On February 10, 1931, he returned in the Discovery and was able to approach close enough to see the headland, naming it for E.R. Darnley, Chairman of the Discovery Committee of the Colonial Office, London, 1923 to 1933.

== Important Bird Area ==
A 440 ha site on fast ice, about 20 km south-east of the cape and 80 km north-west of the Amery Ice Shelf, has been identified as an Important Bird Area (IBA) by BirdLife International because it supports a colony of at least 3,000 emperor penguins (as estimated from 2009 satellite imagery).
