= Temperature–salinity diagram =

Diagrams used to identify water masses

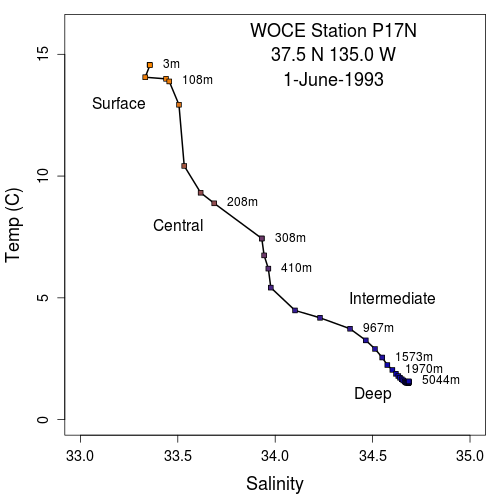
T-S diagram of a station in the North Pacific

In oceanography, temperature-salinity diagrams, sometimes called T-S diagrams, are used to identify water masses. In a T-S diagram, rather than plotting each water property as a separate "profile," with pressure or depth as the vertical coordinate, potential temperature (on the vertical axis) is plotted versus salinity (on the horizontal axis). Temperature and salinity combine to determine the potential density of seawater; contours of constant potential density are often shown in T-S diagrams. Each contour is known as an isopycnal, or a region of constant density. These isopycnals appear curved because of the nonlinearity of the equation of state of seawater. The thermal expansion coefficient, αT, and the haline contraction coefficient, βS, vary with temperature and salinity because both properties affect the potential density of seawater.

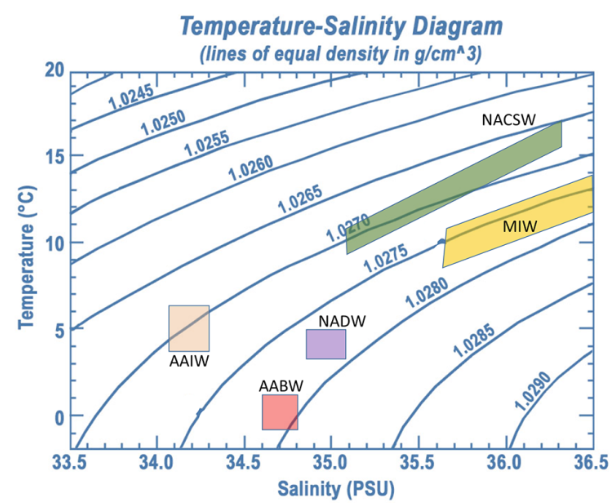
T-S Diagram showing water mass locations

As long as it remains isolated from the surface, where heat or fresh water can be gained or lost, and in the absence of mixing with other water masses, a water parcel's potential temperature and salinity are conserved. Deep water masses thus retain their T-S characteristics for long periods of time, and can be identified readily on a T-S plot. Deep water masses are formed in different locations, and therefore have differing characteristic properties, like ranges of temperature and salinity values. When T-S plots are created by compiling data collected from various locations, it is possible to group the data points based on where the water mass was formed. This gives an idea of how the properties of different water masses compare to each other, which can give an idea of the way that thermohaline circulation works. In general, the depth of the water increases as you move to the bottom right corner of the graph (high salinity, low temperature), but there is some variation. T-S diagrams are also applied in the process of tracking large-scale salinity anomalies; research has shown that over recent decades, regions of abnormal sea surface salinity in the North Atlantic have propagated widely, impacting local ecosystems and the sinking of water masses.
