= North Atlantic Deep Water =

Deep water mass formed in the North Atlantic Ocean

The North Atlantic Deep Water is considered to be one of several possible tipping points in the climate system.

North Atlantic Deep Water (NADW) is a deep water mass formed in the North Atlantic Ocean. Thermohaline circulation (properly described as meridional overturning circulation) of the world's oceans involves the flow of warm surface waters from the southern hemisphere into the North Atlantic. Water flowing northward becomes modified through evaporation and mixing with other water masses, leading to increased salinity. When this water reaches the North Atlantic, it cools and sinks through convection, due to its decreased temperature and increased salinity resulting in increased density. NADW is the outflow of this thick deep layer, which can be detected by its high salinity, high oxygen content, nutrient minima, high ^{14}C/^{12}C, and chlorofluorocarbons (CFCs).

CFCs are anthropogenic substances that enter the surface of the ocean from gas exchange with the atmosphere. This distinct composition allows its path to be traced as it mixes with Circumpolar Deep Water (CDW), which in turn fills the deep Indian Ocean and part of the South Pacific. NADW and its formation is essential to the Atlantic meridional overturning circulation (AMOC), which is responsible for transporting large amounts of water, heat, salt, carbon, nutrients and other substances from the Tropical Atlantic to the Mid and High Latitude Atlantic.

In the conveyor belt model of thermohaline circulation of the world's oceans, the sinking of NADW pulls the waters of the North Atlantic drift northward. However, this is almost certainly an oversimplification of the actual relationship between NADW formation and the strength of the Gulf Stream/North Atlantic drift.

NADW has a temperature of 2.0–3.5 °C with a practical salinity of S_{P} = 34.9–35.0, found at a depth between 1500 and 4000m.

== Formation and sources ==
The NADW is a complex of several water masses formed by deep convection and overflow of dense water across the Greenland-Iceland-Scotland Ridge.

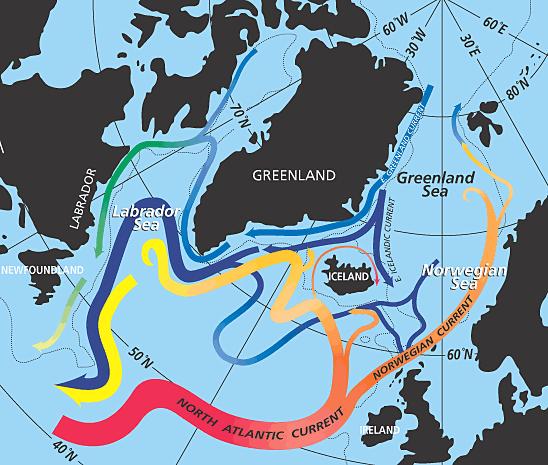
The circulation patterns in the North Atlantic Ocean. Cold, dense water is shown in blue, flowing south from upper latitudes, while warm, less dense water, shown in red, flows north from low latitudes.

The upper layers are formed by deep open ocean convection during winter. Labrador Sea Water (LSW), formed in the Labrador Sea, can reach depths of 2000 m as dense water sinks downward. Classical Labrador Sea Water (CLSW) production is dependent on preconditioning of water in the Labrador Sea from the previous year and the strength of the North Atlantic oscillation (NAO).

During a positive NAO phase, conditions exist for strong winter storms to develop. These storms freshen the surface water, and their winds increase cyclonic flow, which allows denser waters to sink. As a result, the temperature, salinity, and density vary yearly. In some years these conditions do not exist and CLSW is not formed. CLSW has characteristic potential temperature of 3 °C, salinity of 34.88 psu, and density of 34.66.

Another component of LSW is the Upper Labrador Sea Water (ULSW). ULSW forms at a density lower than CLSW and has a CFC maximum between 1200 and 1500 m in the subtropical North Atlantic. Eddies of cold less saline ULSW have similar densities of warmer saltier water and flow along the DWBC, but maintain their high CFCs. The ULSW eddies erode rapidly as they mix laterally with this warmer saltier water.

The lower waters mass of NADW form from overflow of the Greenland–Iceland–Scotland Ridge. They are Iceland–Scotland Overflow Water (ISOW) and Denmark Strait Overflow Water (DSOW). The overflows are a combination of dense Arctic Ocean water (18%), modified Atlantic water (32%), and intermediate water from the Nordic seas (20%), that entrain and mix with other water masses (contributing 30%) as they flow over the Greenland–Iceland–Scotland Ridge.

The formation of both of these waters involves the conversion of warm, salty, northward-flowing surface waters to cold, dense, deep waters behind the Greenland–Iceland–Scotland Ridge. Water flow from the North Atlantic current enters the Arctic Ocean through the Norwegian Current, which splits into the Fram Strait and Barents Sea Branch. Water from the Fram Strait recirculates, reaching a density of DSOW, sinks, and flows towards the Denmark Strait. Water flowing into the Barents Sea feeds ISOW.

ISOW enters the eastern North Atlantic over the Iceland–Scotland Ridge through the Faeroe Bank Channel at a depth of 850 m, with some water flowing over the shallower Iceland–Faeroe Rise. ISOW has a low CFC concentrations and it has been estimated from these concentrations that ISOW resides behind the ridge for 45 years. As the water flows southward at the bottom of the channel, it entrains surrounding water of the eastern North Atlantic, and flows to the western North Atlantic through the Charlie–Gibbs fracture zone, entraining with LSW. This water is less dense than DSOW and lays above it as it flows cyclonically in the Irminger Basin.

DSOW is the coldest, densest, and freshest water mass of NADW. DSOW formed behind the ridge flows over the Denmark Strait at a depth of 600m. The most significant water mass contributing to DSOW is Arctic Intermediate Water (AIW). Winter cooling and convection allow AIW to sink and pool behind the Denmark Strait. Upper AIW has a high amount of anthropogenic tracers due its exposure to the atmosphere. AIW's tritium and CFC signature is observed in DSOW at the base of the Greenland continental slope. This also showed that the DSOW flowing 450 km to the south was no older than 2 years. Both the DSOW and ISOW flow around the Irminger Basin and Labrador Sea in a deep boundary current. Leaving the Greenland Sea with 2.5 Sv, its flow increases to 10 Sv south of Greenland. It is cold and relatively fresh, flowing below 3500 m in the DWBC and spreading inward the deep Atlantic basins.

== Spreading pathways ==
The NADW flows southward through the Atlantic, approaching the Antarctic Bottom Water past the Mid-Atlantic Ridge.

The southward spread of NADW along the Deep Western Boundary current (DWBC) can be traced by its high oxygen content, high CFCs, and density.

ULSW is the major source of upper NADW. ULSW advects southward from the Labrador Sea in small eddies that mix into the DWBC. A CFC maximum associated with ULSW has been observed along 24°N in the DWBC at 1500 m. Some of the upper ULSW recirculates into the Gulf Stream, while some remains in the DWBC. High CFCs in the subtropics indicate recirculation in the subtropics.

ULSW that remains in the DWBC dilutes as it moves equatorward. Deep convection in the Labrador Sea during the late 1980s and early 1990s resulted in CLSW with a lower CFC concentration due to downward mixing. Convection allowed the CFCs to penetrate further downward to 2000m. These minima could be tracked, and were first observed in the subtropics in the early 1990s.

ISOW and DSOW flow around the Irminger Basin and DSOW entering the DWBC. These are the two lower portions of the NADW. Another CFC maximum is seen at 3500 m in the subtropics from the DSOW contribution to NADW. Some of the NADW recirculates with the northern gyre. To the south of the gyre, NADW flows under the Gulf Stream, where it continues along the DWBC until it reaches another gyre in the subtropics.

Lower North Atlantic Deep Water (LNADW), originating in the Greenland and Norwegian seas, brings high salinity, oxygen, and freon concentrations towards to the Romanche Trench, an equatorial fracture zone in the Mid-Atlantic Ridge (MAR). Found at depths around 3,600–4,000 m (11,800–13,100 ft), LNADW flow east through the trench over Antarctic Bottom Water—the trench is the only opening in the MAR where inter-basin exchange is possible for these two water masses.

== Variability ==
It is believed that North Atlantic Deep Water formation has been dramatically reduced at times during the past (such as during the Younger Dryas or during Heinrich events), and that this might correlate with a decrease in the strength of the Gulf Stream and the North Atlantic drift, in turn cooling the climate of northwestern Europe.

There is concern that global warming might cause this to happen again. It is also hypothesized that during the Last Glacial Maximum, NADW was replaced with an analogous watermass that occupied a shallower depth known as Glacial North Atlantic Intermediate Water.

== See also ==
- Ekman transport
- Irminger Current
- Sargasso Sea
