= Antarctic bottom water =

Cold, dense, water mass originating in the Southern Ocean surrounding Antarctica

AABW is formed in the Southern Ocean from surface water cooling in polynyas.

The Antarctic bottom water (AABW) is a type of water mass in the Southern Ocean surrounding Antarctica with temperatures ranging from −0.8 to 2 °C (35 °F) and absolute salinities from 34.6 to 35.0 g/kg. As the densest water mass of the oceans, AABW is found to occupy the depth range below 4000 m of all ocean basins that have a connection to the Southern Ocean at that level. AABW forms the lower branch of the large-scale movement in the world's oceans through thermohaline circulation.

AABW forms near the surface in coastal polynyas along the coastline of Antarctica, where high rates of sea ice formation during winter leads to the densification of the surface waters through brine rejection. Since the water mass forms near the surface, it is responsible for the exchange of large quantities of heat and gases with the atmosphere. AABW has a high oxygen content relative to the rest of the oceans' deep waters, but this depletes over time. This water sinks at four distinct regions around the margins of the continent and forms the AABW; this process leads to ventilation of the deep ocean, or abyssal ventilation.

== Formation and circulation ==
Antarctic bottom water is formed in the Weddell and Ross Seas, off the Adélie Coast and by Cape Darnley from surface water cooling in polynyas and below the ice shelf. An important factor enabling the formation of Antarctic bottom water is the cold surface wind blowing off the Antarctic continent. The surface winds advect sea ice away from the coast, creating polynyas which opens up the water surface to a cold atmosphere during winter, which further helps form more sea ice. Antarctic coastal polynyas form as much as 10% of the overall Southern Ocean sea ice during a single season, amounting to about 2,000 km^{3} of sea ice. Surface water is enriched in salt from sea ice formation and cooled due to being exposed to a cold atmosphere during winter, which increases the density of this water mass. Due to its increased density, it forms overflows down the Antarctic continental slope and continues north along the bottom. It is the densest water in the open ocean, and underlies other bottom and intermediate waters throughout most of the southern hemisphere. The Weddell Sea Bottom Water is the densest component of the Antarctic bottom water.

A major source water for the formation of AABW is the warm offshore watermass known as the circumpolar deep water (CDW; salinity > 35 g/kg and potential temperature > 0 °C). These warm watermasses are cooled by coastal polynyas to form the denser AABW. Coastal polynyas that form AABW help prevent the intruding warm CDW water masses from gaining access to the base of ice shelves, hence acting to protect ice shelves from enhanced basal melting due to oceanic warming. In areas like the Amundsen Sea, where coastal polynya activity has diminished to the point where dense water formation is hindered, the neighboring ice shelves have started to retreat and may be on the brink of collapse.

Evidence indicates that Antarctic bottom water production through the Holocene (last 10,000 years) is not in a steady-state condition; that is, bottom water production sites shift along the Antarctic margin over decade-to-century timescales as conditions for the existence of polynyas change. For example, the calving of the Mertz Glacier, which occurred on 12–13 February 2010, dramatically changed the environment for producing bottom water, reducing export by up to 23% in the region of Adélie Land. Evidence from sediment cores, containing layers of cross-bedded sediments indicating phases of stronger bottom currents, collected on the Mac. Robertson shelf and Adélie Land suggests that they have switched "on" and "off" again as important bottom water production sites over the last several thousand years.

Antarctic bottom water flow in the Equatorial Atlantic

=== Atlantic Ocean ===
The Vema Channel, a deep trough in the Rio Grande Rise of the South Atlantic at 31.3°S 39.4°W, is an important conduit for Antarctic Bottom Water and Weddell Sea Bottom Water migrating north. Upon reaching the equator, about one-third of the northward flowing Antarctic bottom water enters the Guiana Basin, mainly through the southern half of the Equatorial Channel at 35°W. The other part recirculates and some of it flows through the Romanche fracture zone into the eastern Atlantic.

In the Guiana Basin, west of 40°W, the sloping topography and the strong, eastward flowing deep western boundary current might prevent the Antarctic bottom water from flowing west: thus it has to turn north at the eastern slope of the Ceará Rise. At 44°W, north of the Ceará Rise, Antarctic bottom water flows west in the interior of the basin. A large fraction of the Antarctic bottom water enters the eastern Atlantic through the Vema fracture zone.

Pathways of Antarctic bottom water

=== Indian Ocean ===
In the Indian Ocean, the Crozet–Kerguelen Gap allows Antarctic bottom water to move toward the equator. This northward movement amounts to 2.5 Sv. It takes the Antarctic Bottom Water 23 years to reach the Crozet–Kerguelen Gap. South of Africa, Antarctic bottom water flows northwards through the Agulhas Basin and then east through the Agulhas Passage and over the southern margins of the Agulhas Plateau and then into the Mozambique Basin.

== Climate change ==
Climate change and the subsequent melting of the Southern ice sheet have slowed the formation of AABW, and this slowdown is likely to continue. A complete shutdown of AABW formation is possible as soon as 2050. This shutdown would have dramatic effects on ocean circulation and global weather patterns.

=== Potential for AABW Disruption ===
Increased intrusion of warm Circumpolar Deep Water coupled with enhanced ice shelf basal melting can impact the formation of dense shelf waters. For surface water to become deep water, it must be very cold and saline. Much of the deep-water formation comes from brine rejection, where the water deposited is extremely saline and cold, making it extremely dense. The increased ice melt that occurred starting in the early 2000s has created a period of fresher water between 2011 and 2015 within the bottom water. This has been distinctly prevalent in Antarctic bottom waters near West Antarctica, primarily in the Weddell Sea area.

While the freshening of the AABW has corrected itself over the past few years with a decrease in ice melt, the potential for more ice melt in the future still poses a threat. With the potential increase in ice melt at extreme-enough levels, it can have a serious impact on the ability for deep sea water to be formed. While this would create a slowdown referenced above, it may also create additional warming. Increased stratification coming from the fresher and warmer waters will reduce bottom and deep-water circulation and increase warm water flows around Antarctica. The sustained warmer surface waters would only increase the level of ice melt, stratification, and the slowdown of the AABW circulation and formation. Additionally, without the presence of those colder waters producing brine rejection which deposits to the AABW, there may eventually be no formation of bottom water around Antarctica anymore. This would impact more than Antarctica, as AABW plays a major role in bottom water formation and deep-sea circulation, which deposits oxygen to the deep sea and is a major carbon sink. Without these connections, the deep sea will become drastically changed with the potential for collapse in entire deep-sea communities.

Some studies indicate that WSBW formation in the Weddell Sea is dominantly driven by wind-driven sea ice changes, however, and that increased sea ice formation overcompensates for the melting of ice sheets, rendering the effects of melting Antarctic glaciers on WSBW minimal.
