= Climate change and fisheries =

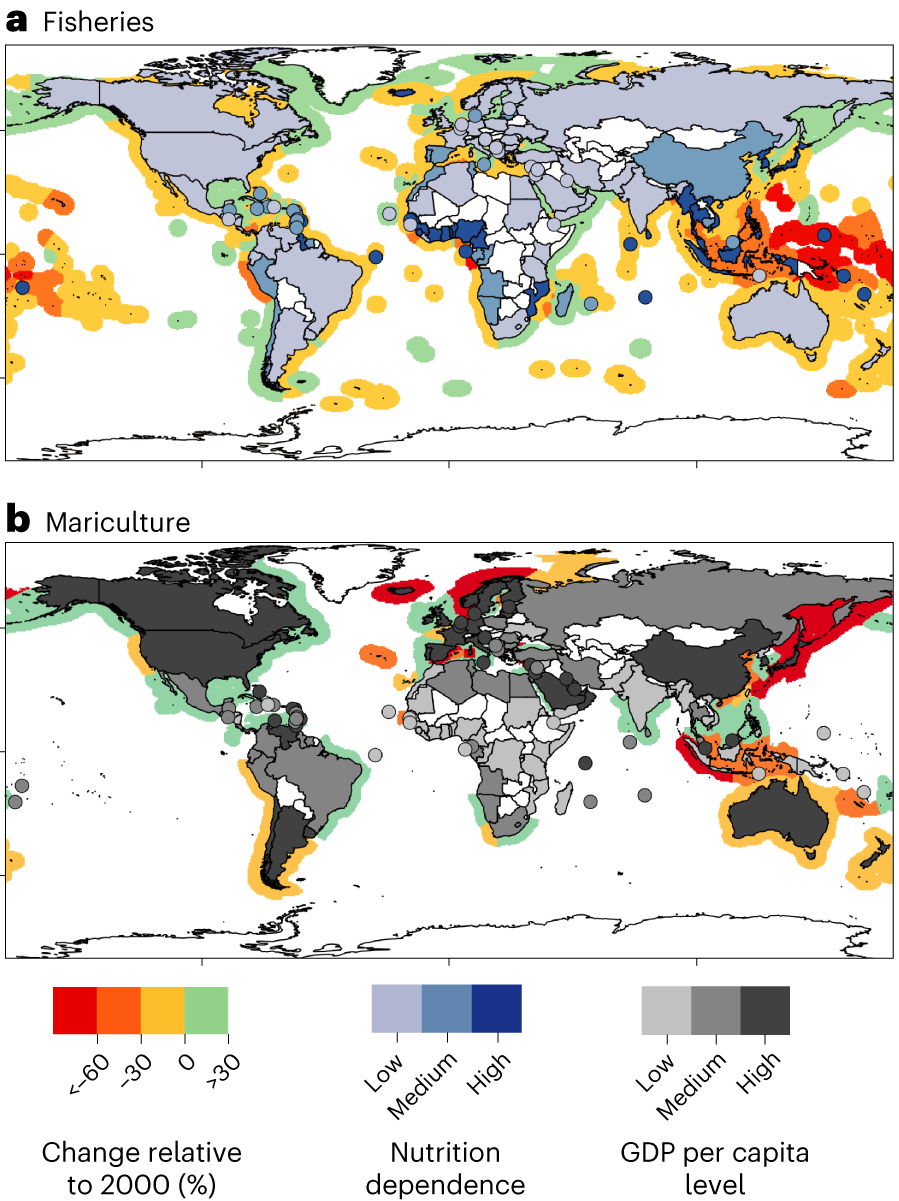
Under the highest-emission scenario, many countries would see substantial reductions in seafood available from exclusive economic zones by 2050.

Fisheries are affected by climate change in many ways: marine aquatic ecosystems are being affected by rising ocean temperatures, ocean acidification and ocean deoxygenation, while freshwater ecosystems are being impacted by changes in water temperature, water flow, and fish habitat loss. These effects vary in the context of each fishery. Climate change is modifying fish distributions and the productivity of marine and freshwater species. Climate change is expected to lead to significant changes in the availability and trade of fish products. The geopolitical and economic consequences will be significant, especially for the countries most dependent on the sector. The biggest decreases in maximum catch potential can be expected in the tropics, mostly in the South Pacific regions.

The impacts of climate change on ocean systems has impacts on the sustainability of fisheries and aquaculture, on the livelihoods of the communities that depend on fisheries, and on the ability of the oceans to capture and store carbon (biological pump). The effect of sea level rise means that coastal fishing communities are significantly impacted by climate change, while changing rainfall patterns and water use impact on inland freshwater fisheries and aquaculture. Increased risks of floods, diseases, parasites and harmful algal blooms are climate change impacts on aquaculture which can lead to losses of production and infrastructure.

It is projected that "climate change decreases the modelled global fish community biomass by as much as 30% by 2100".

However, for projections to be more reliable, many more factors should be taken into account in 2025. An extensive current review recommends: "For projections at a multidecadal scale, it is essential to consider, along with the anthropogenic effects, the demonstrated influence of solar activity and volcanic aerosol forcing in climatic changes in the 20th century and to apply mathematical models based on historical reconstructions of at least 100 years, including the oceanographic variables available in the water column and multiple human activities"

== Effects of climate change on oceans ==
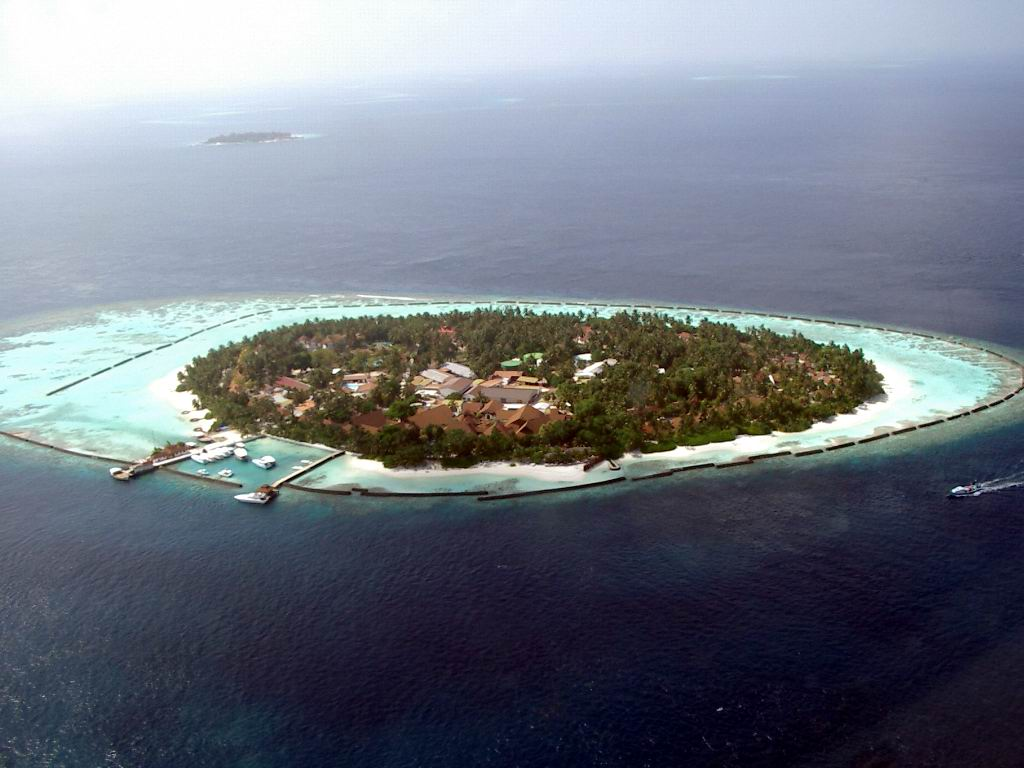
Island with fringing reef in the Maldives. Coral reefs are dying around the world.

Oceans and coastal ecosystems play an important role in the global carbon cycle and in Carbon sequestration. Rising ocean temperatures and ocean acidification are the results of higher levels of greenhouse gases in the atmosphere. Healthy ocean ecosystems are essential for the mitigation of climate change. Coral reefs provide habitat for millions of fish species and with no change it can provoke these reefs to die. Furthermore, the rise in sea levels also affects other ecosystems such as mangroves and marshes, making them experience a lack of both land and hinterland for the purpose to migrate.

One of the most important effects of climate change on oceans is an increase in ocean temperatures. More frequent marine heatwaves are linked to this. The rising temperature contributes to a rise in sea levels due to the expansion of water as it warms and the melting of ice sheets on land. Other effects on oceans include sea ice decline, reduced pH values and oxygen levels, as well as increased ocean stratification. All this can lead to changes in ocean currents, for example, a weakening of the Atlantic meridional overturning circulation (AMOC). The main cause of these changes is emissions of greenhouse gases from human activities, mainly burning of fossil fuels and deforestation. Carbon dioxide and methane are examples of greenhouse gases. The additional greenhouse effect leads to ocean warming because the ocean takes up most of the additional heat in the climate system. The ocean also absorbs some of the extra carbon dioxide that is in the atmosphere. This causes the pH value of the seawater to drop. Scientists estimate that the ocean absorbs about 25% of all human-caused CO_{2} emissions.

The various layers of the oceans have different temperatures. For example, the water is colder towards the bottom of the ocean. This temperature stratification will increase as the ocean surface warms due to rising air temperatures. Connected to this is a decline in mixing of the ocean layers, so that warm water stabilises near the surface. A reduction of cold, deep water circulation follows. The reduced vertical mixing makes it harder for the ocean to absorb heat. So a larger share of future warming goes into the atmosphere and land. One result is an increase in the amount of energy available for tropical cyclones and other storms. Another result is a decrease in nutrients for fish in the upper ocean layers. These changes also reduce the ocean's capacity to store carbon. At the same time, contrasts in salinity are increasing. Salty areas are becoming saltier and fresher areas less salty.

== Greenhouse gas emissions ==
The fishing industry sector is a small contributor to greenhouse gas emissions overall but nevertheless there are options for reducing fuel use and greenhouse gas emissions. For example, about 0.5 percent of total global CO_{2} emissions in 2012 were caused by fishing vessels (including inland vessels): 172.3 million tonnes of CO_{2}. When looking at the aquaculture industry, it was estimated that 385 million tonnes of CO_{2} equivalent (CO_{2} e) were emitted in 2010. This equates to around 7 percent of the emissions from agriculture.

== Impact on fish production ==
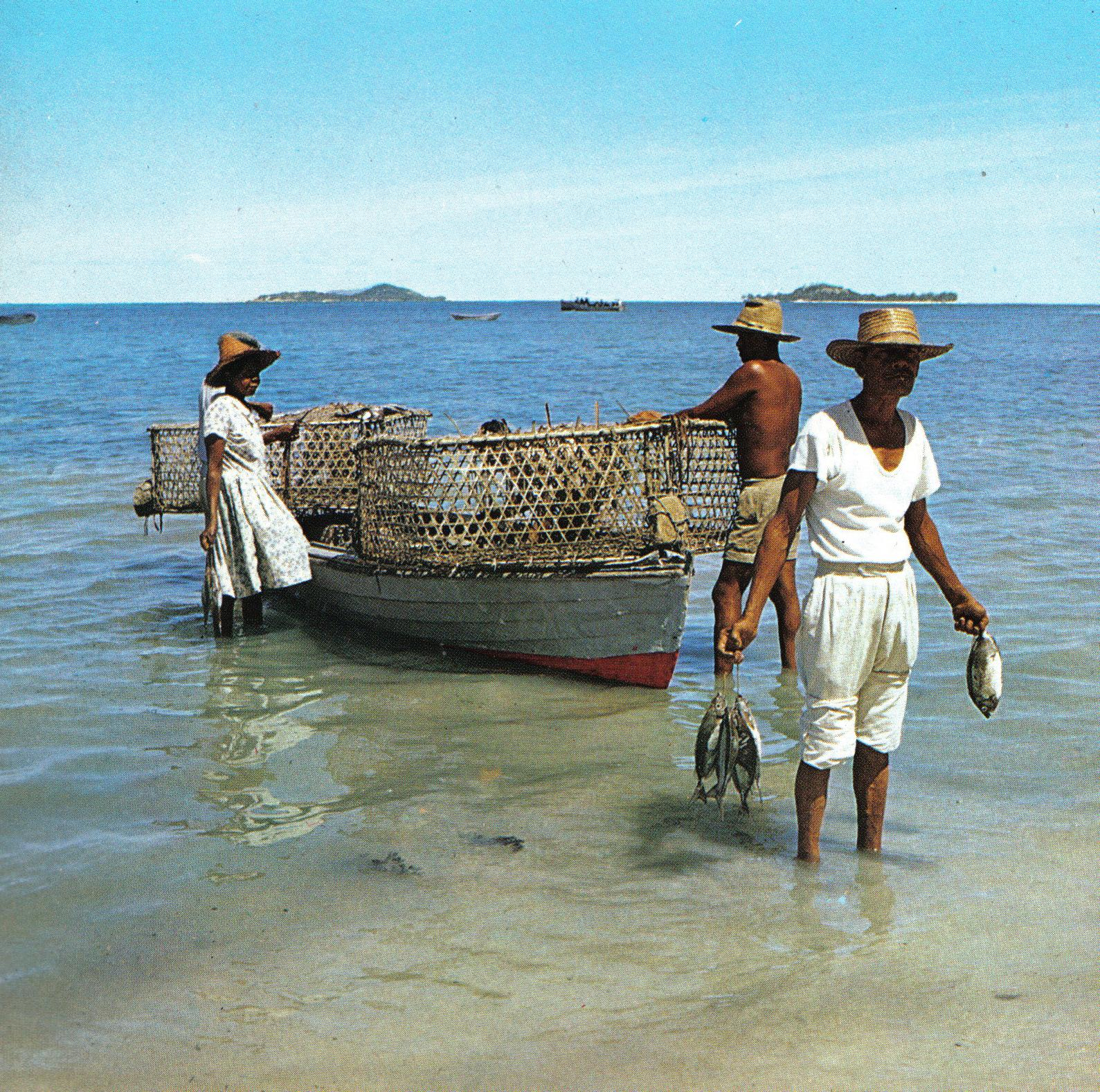
Fisherman landing his catch, Seychelles

The rising ocean acidity makes it more difficult for marine organisms such as shrimp, oysters, or corals to form their shells – a process known as calcification. Many important animals, such as zooplankton, that forms the base of the marine food chain have calcium shells. Thus the entire marine food web is being altered – there are "cracks in the food chain". As a result, the distribution, productivity, and species composition of global fish production is changing, generating complex and inter-related impacts on oceans, estuaries, coral reefs, mangroves and sea grass beds that provide habitats and nursery areas for fish. Changing rainfall patterns and water scarcity is impacting on river and lake fisheries and aquaculture production. After the Last Glacial Maximum of about 21,000 years ago, the global average air temperature has risen approximately 3 degrees, leading to an increase in sea temperatures.

Fish catch of the global ocean is expected to decline by 6 percent by 2100 and by 11 percent in tropical zones. Diverse models predict that by 2050, the total global fish catch potential may vary by less than 10 percent depending on the trajectory of greenhouse gas emissions, but with very significant geographical variability. Decreases in both marine and terrestrial production in almost 85 percent of coastal countries analysed are predicted, varying widely in their national capacity to adapt.

Fish populations of skipjack tuna and bigeye tuna are expected to be displaced further to the east due to the effects of climate change on ocean temperatures and currents. This will shift the fishing grounds toward the Pacific islands and away from its primary owner of Melanesia, disrupting western Pacific canneries, shifting tuna production elsewhere, and having an uncertain effect on food security.

Species that are over-fished, such as the variants of Atlantic cod, are more susceptible to the effects of climate change. Over-fished populations have less size, genetic diversity, and age than other populations of fish. This makes them more susceptible to environment related stress, including those resulting from climate change. In the case of Atlantic cod located in the Baltic Sea, which are stressed close to their upper limits, this could lead to consequences related to the population's average size and growth.

Due to climate change, the distribution of zooplankton has changed. Cool water copepod assemblages have moved north because the waters get warmer, they have been replaced by warm water copepods assemblages however it has a lower biomass and certain small species. This movement of copepods could have large impacts on many systems, especially high trophic level fish. For example, Atlantic cod require a diet of large copepods but because they have moved pole-wards morality rates are high and as a result the recruitment of this cod has plummeted.

Increase in water temperature as a result of climate change will alter the productivity of aquatic ecosystems. Flourish may be undesirable or even harmful. For example, the large fish predators that require cool water may be lost from smaller lakes as surface water temperature warms, and this may indirectly cause more blooms of nuisance algae, which can reduce water quality and pose potential health problems.

In freshwater ecosystems, climate warming drives bidirectional and asymmetric shifts in fish distributions. For example, in the Volga-Kama basin, "southern" Ponto-Caspian species are actively expanding their ranges northward into newly formed reservoir habitats, while "northern" cold-adapted species (such as vendace and European smelt) are experiencing significant range regression due to increasing water temperatures and altered thermal dynamics.

== Impact on fishing communities ==
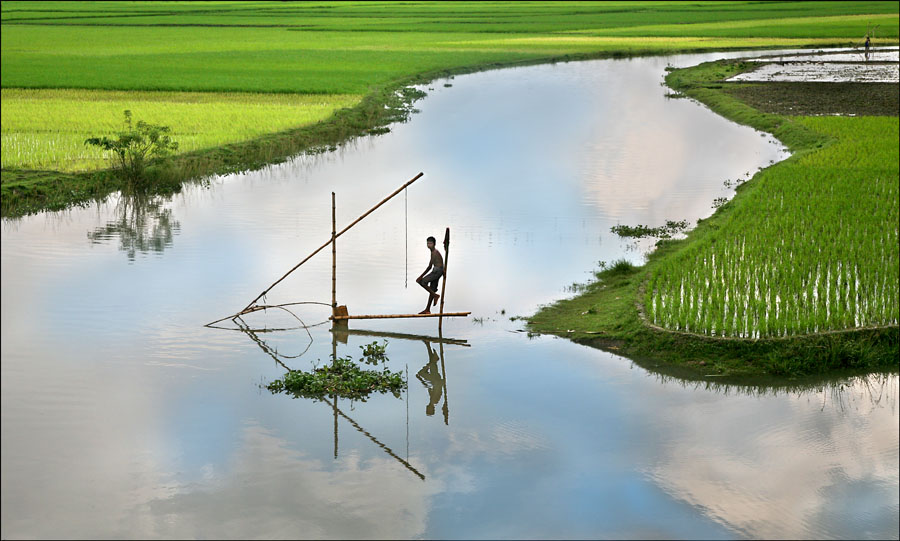
Fishing with a lift net in Bangladesh. Coastal fishing communities in Bangladesh are vulnerable to flooding from sea-level rises.

Coastal and fishing populations and countries dependent on fisheries are particularly vulnerable to climate change. Low-lying countries such as the Maldives and Tuvalu are particularly vulnerable and entire communities may become the first climate refugees. Fishing communities in Bangladesh are subject not only to sea-level rise, but also flooding and increased typhoons. Fishing communities along the Mekong river produce over 1 million tons of basa fish annually and livelihoods and fish production will suffer from saltwater intrusion resulting from rising sea level and dams. In rural Alaska, residents of the Noatak and Selawik villages struggle with unpredictable weather, changes in fish abundance and movement, and boat access changes due to climate change. These impacts significantly impact sustainability and subsistence practices.

Fisheries and aquaculture contribute significantly to food security and livelihoods. Fish provides essential nutrition for 3 billion people and at least 50% of animal protein and minerals to 400 million people from the poorest countries. This food security is threatened by climate change and the increasing world population. Climate change changes several parameters of the fishing population: availability, stability, access, and utilization. The specific effects of climate change on these parameters will vary widely depending on the characteristics of the area, with some areas benefiting from the shift in trends and some areas being harmed based on the factors of exposure, sensitivity, and ability to respond to said changes. The lack of oxygen in warmer waters will possibly lead to the extinction of aquatic animals

Worldwide food security may not change significantly, however rural and poor populations would be disproportionately and negatively affected based on these criteria, as they lack the resources and manpower to rapidly change their infrastructure and adapt. In Bangladesh, Cambodia, Gambia, Ghana, Sierra Leone or Sri Lanka, the dependency on fish for protein intake is over 50%. Over 500 million people in developing countries depend, directly or indirectly, on fisheries and aquaculture for their livelihoods – aquaculture is the world's fastest growing food production system, growing at 7% annually and fish products are among the most widely traded foods, with more than 37% (by volume) of world production traded internationally.

Human activities also increase the impact of climate change. Human activity has been linked to lake nutrition levels, which high levels are correlated to increasing vulnerability to climate change. Excess nutrients in water bodies, or eutrophication, can result in more algae and plant growth which can be harmful to humans, aquatic communities, and even birds.

Climate change will also have an impact on recreational fisheries and commercial fisheries, as shifts in distribution could lead to changes in popular fishing locations, economic changes in fishing communities, and increased accessibility of fisheries in the North.

== Adaptation ==
The change in temperature and decrease in oxygen is expected to occur too quickly for effective adaptation of affected species. Fishes can migrate to cooler places, but there are not always appropriate spawning sites.

A 2025 systematic review of small-scale marine fisheries reported that 67.7% of documented responses to climate- and resource-related shocks were short-term coping strategies, while 32.3% were longer-term adaptive strategies.

Several international agencies, including the World Bank and the Food and Agriculture Organization have programs to help countries and communities adapt to global warming, for example by developing policies to improve the resilience of natural resources, through assessments of risk and vulnerability, by increasing awareness of climate change impacts and strengthening key institutions, such as for weather forecasting and early warning systems. The World Development Report 2010 – Development and Climate Change, Chapter 3 shows that reducing overcapacity in fishing fleets and rebuilding fish stocks can both improve resilience to climate change and increase economic returns from marine capture fisheries by US$50 billion per year, while also reducing GHG emissions by fishing fleets. Consequently, removal of subsidies on fuel for fishing can have a double benefit by reducing emissions and overfishing.

Investment in sustainable aquaculture can buffer water use in agriculture while producing food and diversifying economic activities. Algal biofuels also show potential as algae can produce 15-300 times more oil per acre than conventional crops, such as rapeseed, soybeans, or jatropha and marine algae do not require scarce freshwater. Programs such as the GEF-funded Coral Reef Targeted Research provide advice on building resilience and conserving coral reef ecosystems, while six Pacific countries recently gave a formal undertaking to protect the reefs in a biodiversity hotspot – the Coral Triangle.

The costs and benefits of adaptation are essentially local or national, while the costs of mitigation are essentially national whereas the benefits are global. Some activities generate both mitigation and adaptation benefits, for example, the restoration of mangrove forests can protect shorelines from erosion and provide breeding grounds for fish while also sequestering carbon.

== Over-fishing ==
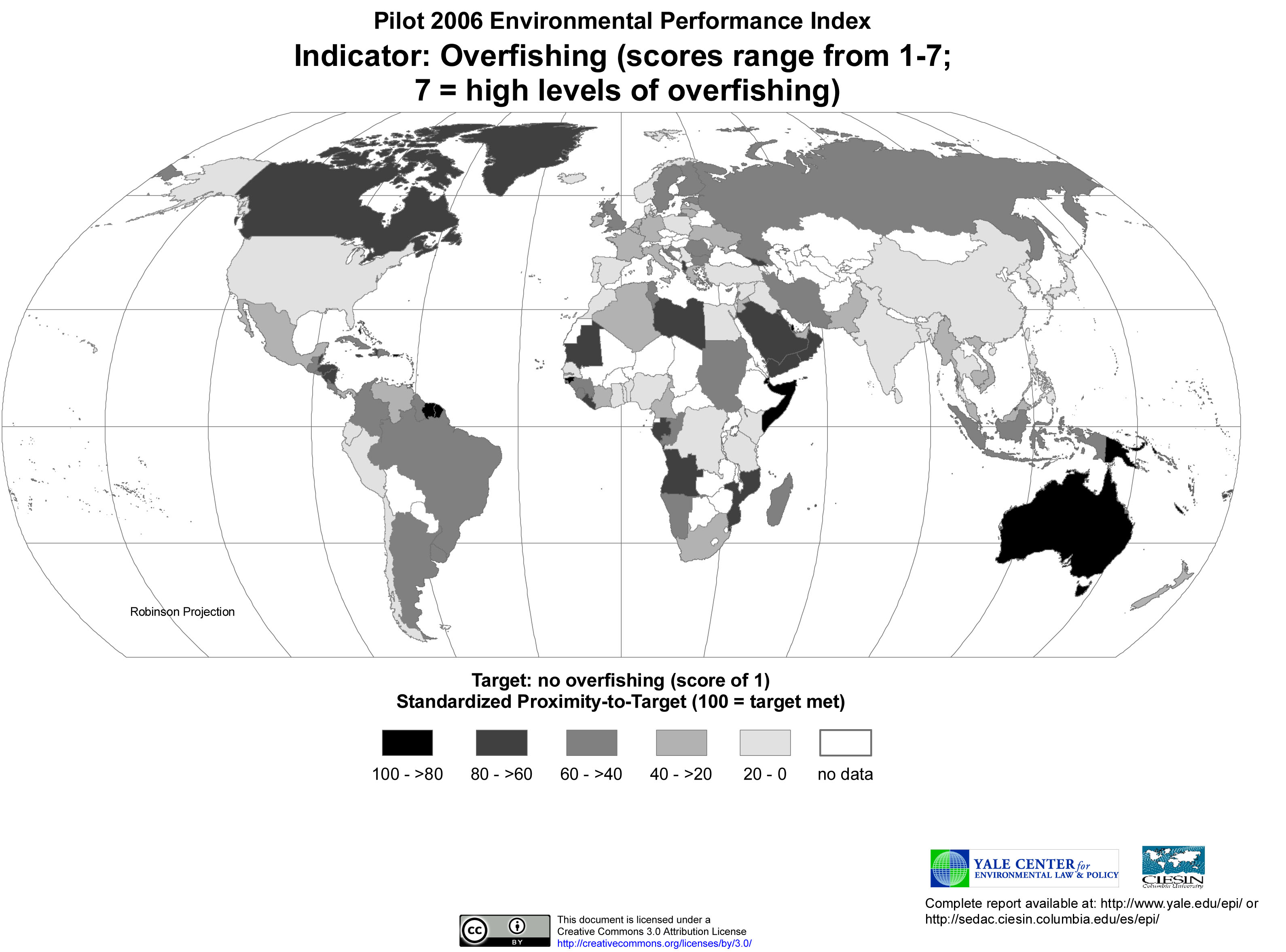
Overfishing (2006 Pilot Environmental Performance Index)

Although there is a decline of fisheries due to climate change, a related cause for this decrease is due to over-fishing. Over-fishing exacerbates the effects of climate change by creating conditions that make a fishing population more sensitive to environmental changes. Studies show that the state of the ocean is causing fisheries to collapse, and in areas where fisheries have not yet collapsed, the amount of over-fishing that is done is having a significant impact on the industry. Fishing that is destructive and unsustainable affects biodiversity. Minimizing over-fishing and destructive fishing will increase Ocean resilience to climate change hence mitigating climate change.

== See also ==
- Carbon sequestration
- Effects of climate change on agriculture
- List of harvested aquatic animals by weight
- Marine pollution
- Special Report on the Ocean and Cryosphere in a Changing Climate (2019)
- Sustainable fisheries

== Sources ==
This article incorporates text from a free content work. Licensed under CC BY-SA 3.0 IGO (license statement/permission). Text taken from In brief, The State of World Fisheries and Aquaculture, 2018, FAO, FAO.
