= Effects of the El Niño–Southern Oscillation in the United States =

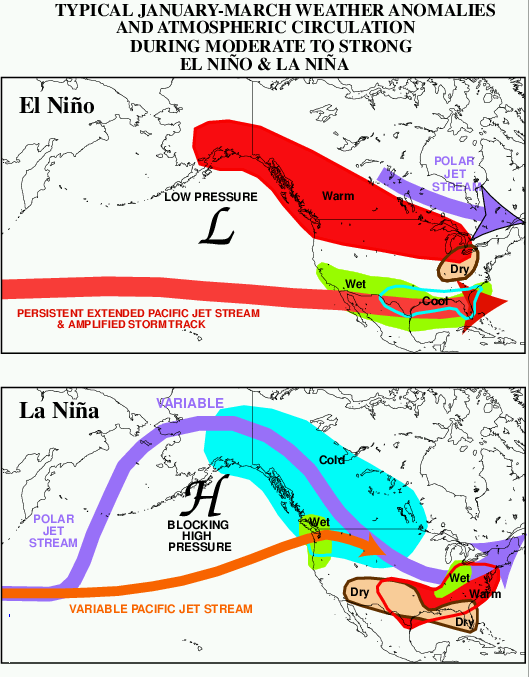
Impact of El Niño and La Niña on North America

The El Niño–Southern Oscillation affects the location of the jet stream, which alters rainfall patterns across the West, Midwest, the Southeast, and throughout the tropics. The shift in the jet stream also leads to shifts in the occurrence of severe weather, and the number of tropical cyclones expected within the tropics in the Atlantic and Pacific oceans affected by changes in the ocean temperature and the subtropical jet stream. The winter will have a negative phase according to the Arctic oscillation (AO).

== Temperature ==
During El Niño, the northern tier of the conterminous 48 states and southern Alaska will exhibit above normal temperatures during the fall and winter. The Gulf Coast of the United States will experience below normal temperatures during the winter season.

== Precipitation ==
Across Alaska, El Niño events do not have a correlation towards dry or wet conditions; however, La Niña events lead to drier than normal conditions. During El Niño events, increased precipitation is expected in Southern California, Arizona, and New Mexico due to a more southerly, zonal, storm track over the Southwest, leading to increased winter snowpack, but a more subdued summer monsoon season. During La Niña, increased precipitation is diverted into the Pacific Northwest due to a more northerly storm track. During La Niña events, the storm track shifts far enough northward to bring wetter than normal winter conditions (in the form of increased snowfall) to the Midwestern states, as well as hot and dry summers and possibly a wetter summer monsoon season in the Southwest. During the El Niño portion of ENSO, increased precipitation falls along the Gulf Coast and Southeast due to a stronger than normal, and more southerly, subtropical jet stream. In the late winter and spring during El Niño events, drier than average conditions can be expected in Hawaii. On Guam during El Niño years, dry season precipitation averages below normal. However, the threat of a tropical cyclone is over triple what is normal during El Niño years, so extreme shorter duration rainfall events are possible. On American Samoa during El Niño events, precipitation averages about 10 percent above normal, while La Niña events lead to precipitation amounts which average close to 10 percent below normal. ENSO is linked to higher average temperatures and abnormal rainfall patterns over Puerto Rico.

El Niño has historically been associated with higher rainfall in California. However, this relationship is not consistent, and depends on the "flavor" of El Niño. The relationship between El Niño and California rainfall has been described as "fragile", as only the "persistent El Niño" leads to consistently higher rainfall in the state, while the other flavors of ENSO have mixed effects at best.

Historically, El Niño was not understood to affect U.S. weather patterns until Christensen et al. (1981) used entropy minimax pattern discovery based on information theory to advance the science of long range weather prediction. Previous computer models of weather were based on persistence alone and reliable to only 5–7 days into the future. Long range forecasting was essentially random. Christensen et al. demonstrated the ability to predict the probability that precipitation will be below or above average with modest but statistically significant skill one, two and even three years into the future.

=== Snowfall ===
During an El Niño, snowfall is greater than average across the Southern Rockies and Sierra Nevada mountain range, and is well-below normal across the Upper Midwest and Great Lakes states. During a La Niña, snowfall is above normal across the Pacific Northwest and western Great Lakes.

== Severe weather ==
During El Niño, the jet stream is oriented from west to east across the southern portion of the United States, making the region more susceptible to severe weather outbreaks. During La Niña, the jet stream and severe weather are likely to be farther north than normal.

El Niño, as well as a negative AO phase, are correlated with an increase in frequency of strong Nor'easters in New England.

== Tropical cyclones ==
Due to changes in upper-level winds caused by variations in the ENSO cycle, the likelihood of a North Atlantic hurricane hitting the Continental United States is increased during La Niña conditions, and decreased during El Niño conditions. On the other hand, however, hurricanes in the eastern and central Pacific are the reverse of those in the Atlantic due to increased sea surface temperatures; therefore, the odds of a hurricane hitting Hawaii or, rarely, California are increased during El Niño years and decreased during La Niña years.
