= Effects of climate change on oceans =

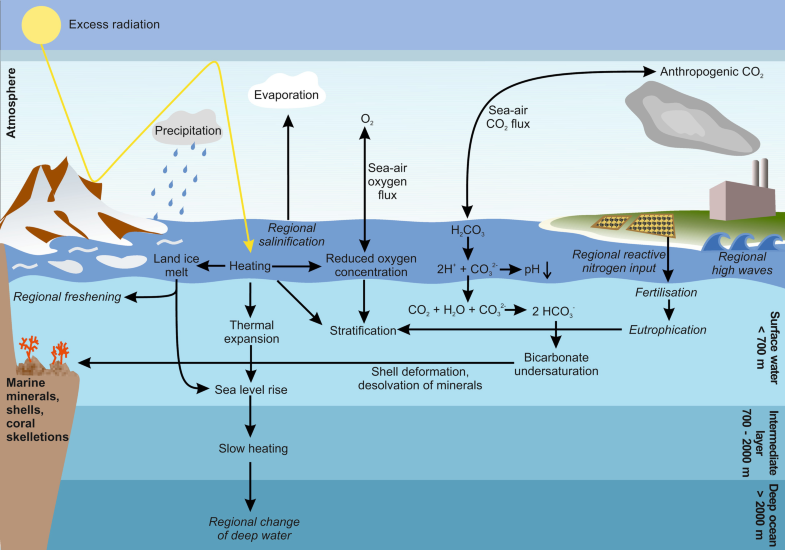
Overview of climatic changes and their effects on the ocean. Regional effects are displayed in italics.

This NASA animation conveys Earth's oceanic processes as a driving force among Earth's interrelated systems.

One of the most important effects of climate change on oceans is an increase in ocean temperatures. More frequent marine heatwaves are linked to this. The rising temperature contributes to a rise in sea levels due to the expansion of water as it warms and the melting of ice sheets on land. Other effects on oceans include sea ice decline, reduced pH values and oxygen levels, as well as increased ocean stratification. All this can lead to changes in ocean currents, for example, a weakening of the Atlantic meridional overturning circulation (AMOC). The main cause of these changes is emissions of greenhouse gases from human activities, mainly burning of fossil fuels and deforestation. Carbon dioxide and methane are examples of greenhouse gases. The additional greenhouse effect leads to ocean warming because the ocean takes up most of the additional heat in the climate system. The ocean also absorbs some of the extra carbon dioxide that is in the atmosphere. This causes the pH value of the seawater to drop. Scientists estimate that the ocean absorbs about 25% of all human-caused CO_{2} emissions.

The various layers of the oceans have different temperatures. For example, the water is colder towards the bottom of the ocean. This temperature stratification will increase as the ocean surface warms due to rising air temperatures. Connected to this is a decline in mixing of the ocean layers, so that warm water stabilises near the surface. A reduction of cold, deep water circulation follows. The reduced vertical mixing makes it harder for the ocean to absorb heat. So a larger share of future warming goes into the atmosphere and land. One result is an increase in the amount of energy available for tropical cyclones and other storms. Another result is a decrease in nutrients for fish in the upper ocean layers. These changes also reduce the ocean's capacity to store carbon. At the same time, contrasts in salinity are increasing. Salty areas are becoming saltier and fresher areas less salty.

Warmer water cannot contain the same amount of oxygen as cold water. As a result, oxygen from the oceans moves to the atmosphere. Increased thermal stratification may reduce the supply of oxygen from surface waters to deeper waters. This lowers the water's oxygen content even more. The ocean has already lost oxygen throughout its water column. Oxygen minimum zones are increasing in size worldwide.

These changes harm marine ecosystems, and this can lead to biodiversity loss or changes in species distribution. This, in turn, can affect fishing and coastal tourism. For example, rising water temperatures are harming tropical coral reefs. The direct effect is coral bleaching on these reefs, because they are sensitive to even minor temperature changes. So a small increase in water temperature could have a significant impact on these environments. Another example is the loss of sea ice habitats due to warming. This will have severe impacts on polar bears and other animals that rely on it. The effects of climate change on oceans put additional pressures on ocean ecosystems which are already under pressure by other impacts from human activities.

== Changes due to rising greenhouse gas levels ==
Most excess heat trapped by human-induced global warming is absorbed by the oceans, penetrating to its deeper layers.

Energy (heat) added to various parts of the climate system due to global warming (data from 2007).

Presently (2020), atmospheric carbon dioxide (CO_{2}) levels of more than 410 parts per million (ppm) are nearly 50% higher than preindustrial levels. These elevated levels and rapid growth rates are unprecedented in the geological record's 55 million years. The source for this excess CO_{2} is clearly established as human-driven, reflecting a mix of fossil fuel burning, industrial, and land-use/land-change emissions. The idea that the ocean serves as a major sink for anthropogenic CO_{2} has been discussed in scientific literature since at least the late 1950s. Several pieces of evidence point to the ocean absorbing roughly a quarter of total anthropogenic CO_{2} emissions.

The latest key findings about the observed changes and impacts from 2019 include:

It is virtually certain that the global ocean has warmed unabated since 1970 and has taken up more than 90% of the excess heat in the climate system [...]. Since 1993, the rate of ocean warming has more than doubled [...]. Marine heatwaves have very likely doubled in frequency since 1982 and are increasing in intensity [...]. By absorbing more CO2, the ocean has undergone increasing surface acidification [...]. A loss of oxygen has occurred from the surface to 1000 m [...].

— IPCC Special Report on the Ocean and Cryosphere in a Changing Climate (2019),

More recent observational data extended this trend: according to the 2025 edition of the Indicators of Global Climate Change (published June 2026), the global number of marine heatwave days more than tripled between 1991 and 2025, with 2025 alone recording 65 such days.

=== Rising ocean temperature ===
Chart with data from NASA showing how land and sea surface air temperatures have changed vs a pre-industrial baseline. Land surface temperatures have increased faster than ocean temperatures, as the ocean absorbs about 92% of excess heat generated by global warming.

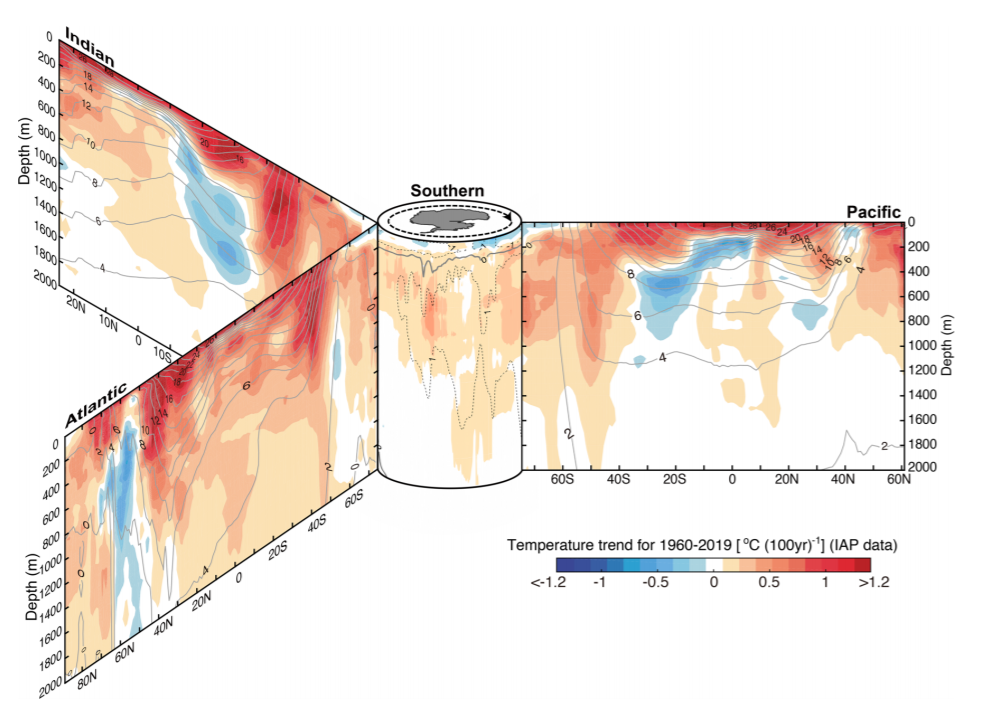
The illustration of temperature changes from 1960 to 2019 across each ocean starting at the Southern Ocean around Antarctica.

It is clear that the ocean is warming as a result of climate change, and this rate of warming is increasing. The global ocean was the warmest it had ever been recorded by humans in 2022. This is determined by the ocean heat content, which exceeded the previous 2021 maximum in 2022. The steady rise in ocean temperatures is an unavoidable result of the Earth's energy imbalance, which is primarily caused by rising levels of greenhouse gases. Between pre-industrial times and the 2011–2020 decade, the ocean's surface has heated between 0.68 and 1.01 °C.

The majority of ocean heat gain occurs in the Southern Ocean. For example, between the 1950s and the 1980s, the temperature of the Antarctic Southern Ocean rose by 0.17 °C (0.31 °F), nearly twice the rate of the global ocean.

The warming rate varies with depth. The upper ocean (above 700 m) is warming the fastest. At an ocean depth of a thousand metres the warming occurs at a rate of nearly 0.4 °C per century (data from 1981 to 2019). In deeper zones of the ocean (globally speaking), at 2000 metres depth, the warming has been around 0.1 °C per century. The warming pattern is different for the Antarctic Ocean (at 55°S), where the highest warming (0.3 °C per century) has been observed at a depth of 4500 m.

A study published in 2025 projected that rising ocean temperatures, together with other climate-driven stressors, will more than double cumulative impacts on marine ecosystems by mid-century. It particularly affects in the Arctic, Antarctic, tropical regions, and coastal areas where biodiversity and human reliance are highest.

==== Marine heatwaves ====
Marine heatwaves also take their toll on marine life: For example, due to fall-out from the 2019-2021 Pacific Northwest marine heatwave, Bering Sea snow crab populations declined 84% between 2018 and 2022, a loss of 9.8 billion crabs.

Scientists predict that the frequency, duration, scale (area), and intensity of marine heatwaves will increase. This is because sea surface temperatures will continue to increase with global warming. The IPCC Sixth Assessment Report (SAR6) in 2022 stated that "marine heatwaves are more frequent [...], more intense and longer [...] since the 1980s, and since at least 2006 very likely attributable to anthropogenic climate change". This confirmed earlier findings in a 2019 IPCC report that "Marine heatwaves [...] have doubled in frequency and have become longer lasting, more intense and more extensive (very likely)." The 2022 report predicted that marine heatwaves will become "four times more frequent in 2081–2100 compared to 1995–2014" under the lower greenhouse gas emissions scenario, or eight times more frequent under the higher emissions scenario.

==== Ocean heat content ====
The ocean temperature varies from place to place. Temperatures are higher near the equator and lower at the poles. As a result, changes in total ocean heat content best illustrate ocean warming. When compared to 1969–1993, heat uptake has increased between 1993 and 2017.

Ocean heat content (OHC) or ocean heat uptake (OHU) is the energy absorbed and stored by oceans. It is an important indicator of global warming. Ocean heat content is calculated by measuring ocean temperature at many different locations and depths, and integrating the areal density of a change in enthalpic energy over an ocean basin or entire ocean.

Between 1971 and 2018, a steady upward trend in ocean heat content accounted for over 90% of Earth's excess energy from global warming. Scientists estimate a 1961–2022 warming trend of 0.43 ± 0.08 W/m², accelerating at about 0.15 ± 0.04 W/m² per decade. By 2020, about one third of the added energy had propagated to depths below 700 meters. The five highest ocean heat observations to a depth of 2000 meters all occurred in the period 2020–2024. The main driver of this increase has been human-caused greenhouse gas emissions.

=== Ocean acidification ===
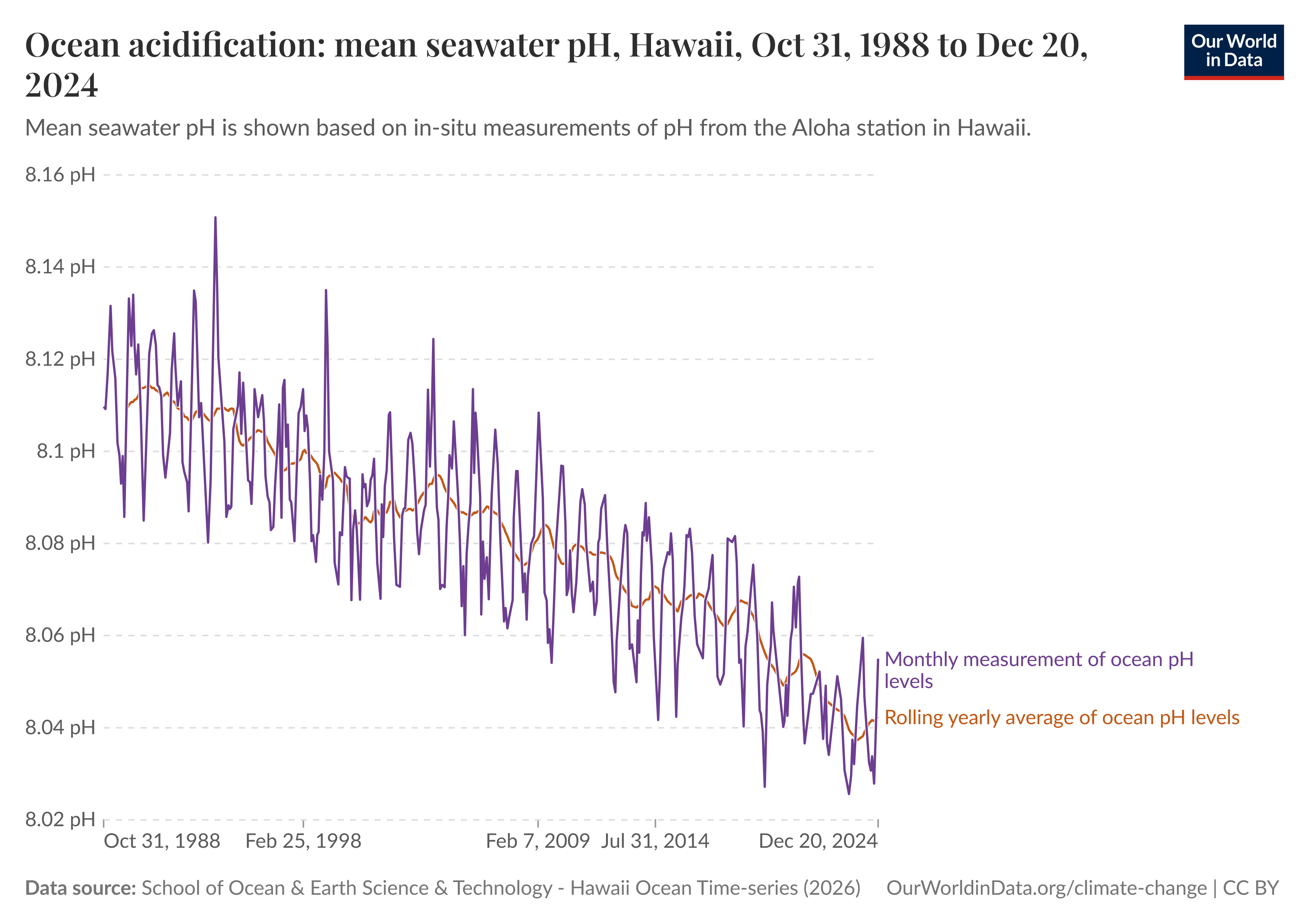
Ocean acidification: mean seawater pH. Mean seawater pH is shown based on in-situ measurements of pH from the Aloha station.

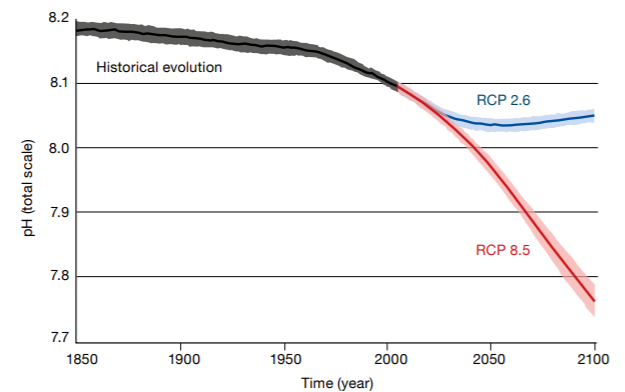
Change in pH since the beginning of the industrial revolution. RCP2.6 scenario is "low CO_{2} emissions". RCP8.5 scenario is "high CO_{2} emissions".

Ocean acidification is the ongoing decrease in the pH of the Earth's ocean. Between 1950 and 2026, the average pH of the ocean surface fell from approximately 8.15 to 8.05. Carbon dioxide emissions from human activities are the primary cause of ocean acidification, with atmospheric carbon dioxide (CO_{2}) levels exceeding 422 ppm (as of 2024). CO_{2} from the atmosphere is absorbed by the oceans. This chemical reaction produces carbonic acid (H_{2}CO_{3}) which dissociates into a bicarbonate ion (HCO^{−}_{3}) and a hydrogen ion (H^{+}). The presence of free hydrogen ions (H^{+}) lowers the pH of the ocean, increasing acidity (this does not mean that seawater is acidic yet; It is still alkaline, with a pH higher than 8). Marine calcifying organisms, such as mollusks and corals, are especially vulnerable because they rely on calcium carbonate to build shells and skeletons.

A change in pH by 0.1 represents a 26% increase in hydrogen ion concentration in the world's oceans (the pH scale is logarithmic, so a change of one in pH units is equivalent to a tenfold change in hydrogen ion concentration). Sea-surface pH and carbonate saturation states vary depending on ocean depth and location. Colder and higher latitude waters are capable of absorbing more CO_{2}. This can cause acidity to rise, lowering the pH and carbonate saturation levels in these areas. Several other factors influence the atmosphere-ocean CO_{2} exchange, and thus local ocean acidification. These include ocean currents and upwelling zones, proximity to large continental rivers, sea ice coverage, and atmospheric exchange with nitrogen and sulfur from fossil fuel burning and agriculture.

A lower ocean pH has a range of potentially harmful effects for marine organisms. Scientists have observed for example reduced calcification, lowered immune responses, and reduced energy for basic functions such as reproduction. Ocean acidification can impact marine ecosystems that provide food and livelihoods for many people. About one billion people are wholly or partially dependent on the fishing, tourism, and coastal management services provided by coral reefs. Ongoing acidification of the oceans may therefore threaten food chains linked with the oceans.

=== Time scales ===
Many ocean-related elements of the climate system respond slowly to warming. For instance, acidification of the deep ocean will continue for millennia, and the same is true for the increase in ocean heat content. Similarly, sea level rise will continue for centuries or even millennia even if greenhouse gas emissions are brought to zero, due to the slow response of ice sheets to warming and the continued uptake of heat by the oceans, which expand when warmed.

== Effects on the physical environment ==
=== Sea level rise ===
The global average sea level has risen about 250 millimetres (9.8 in) since 1880, increasing the elevation on top of which other types of flooding (high-tide flooding, storm surge) occur.

If countries cut greenhouse gas emissions significantly (lowest trace), sea level rise by 2100 will be limited to 0.3 to 0.6 meters (1–2 feet). However, in a worst-case scenario (top trace), sea levels could rise 5 meters (16 feet) by the year 2300.

Many coastal cities will experience coastal flooding in the coming decades and beyond. Local subsidence, which may be natural but can be increased by human activity, can exacerbate coastal flooding. Coastal flooding will threaten hundreds of millions of people by 2050, particularly in Southeast Asia. Without adaptation, annual global exposure to coastal flooding is projected to exceed 300 million people by 2100, with disproportionate impacts across Asia and West Africa.

The sea level has generally been rising since the end of the Last Glacial Maximum, which was around 20,000 years ago. Between 1901 and 2018, the global average sea level rose by 15–25 cm (6–10 in), with an increase of 2.3 mm (0.091 in) per year since the 1970s. This was faster than the sea level had ever risen over at least the past 3,000 years. The rate accelerated to 4.62 mm (0.182 in)/yr for the decade 2013–2022. Climate change due to human activities is the main cause of this persistent acceleration. Between 1993 and 2018, melting ice sheets and glaciers accounted for 44% of sea level rise, with another 42% resulting from thermal expansion of water.

=== Changing ocean currents ===
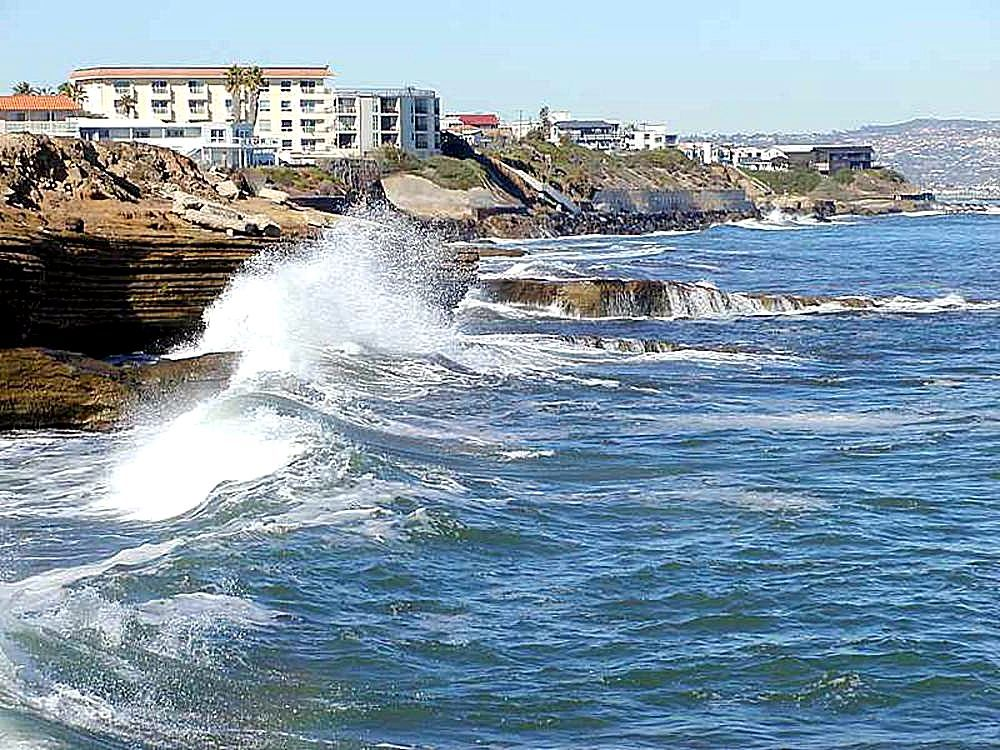
Waves on an ocean coast

Ocean currents are caused by temperature variations caused by sunlight and air temperatures at various latitudes, as well as prevailing winds and the different densities of salt and fresh water. Warm air rises near the equator. Later, as it moves toward the poles, it cools again. Cool air sinks near the poles, but warms and rises again as it moves toward the equator. This produces Hadley cells, which are large-scale wind patterns, with similar effects driving a mid-latitude cell in each hemisphere. Wind patterns associated with these circulation cells drive surface currents which push the surface water to higher latitudes where the air is colder. This cools the water, causing it to become very dense in comparison to lower latitude waters, causing it to sink to the ocean floor, forming North Atlantic Deep Water (NADW) in the north and Antarctic Bottom Water (AABW) in the south.

Driven by this sinking and the upwelling that occurs in lower latitudes, as well as the driving force of the winds on surface water, the ocean currents act to circulate water throughout the sea. When global warming is factored in, changes occur, particularly in areas where deep water is formed. As the oceans warm and glaciers and polar ice caps melt, more and more fresh water is released into the high latitude regions where deep water forms, lowering the density of the surface water. As a result, the water sinks more slowly than it would normally.

The Atlantic Meridional Overturning Circulation (AMOC) may have weakened since the preindustrial era, according to modern observations and paleoclimate reconstructions (the AMOC is part of a global thermohaline circulation), but there is too much uncertainty in the data to know for certain. Climate change projections assessed in 2021 indicate that the AMOC is very likely to weaken over the course of the 21st century. A weakening of this magnitude could have a significant impact on global climate, with the North Atlantic being particularly vulnerable.

Any changes in ocean currents affect the ocean's ability to absorb carbon dioxide (which is affected by water temperature) as well as ocean productivity because the currents transport nutrients (see Impacts on phytoplankton and net primary production). Because the AMOC deep ocean circulation is slow (it takes hundreds to thousands of years to circulate the entire ocean), it is slow to respond to climate change.

=== Increasing stratification ===
Drivers of hypoxia and ocean acidification intensification in upwelling shelf systems. Equatorward winds drive the upwelling of low dissolved oxygen (DO), high nutrient, and high dissolved inorganic carbon (DIC) water from above the oxygen minimum zone. Cross-shelf gradients in productivity and bottom water residence times drive the strength of DO (DIC) decrease (increase) as water transits across a productive continental shelf.

Changes in ocean stratification are significant because they can influence productivity and oxygen levels. The separation of water into layers based on density is known as stratification. Stratification by layers occurs in all ocean basins. The stratified layers limit how much vertical water mixing takes place, reducing the exchange of heat, carbon, oxygen and particles between the upper ocean and the interior. Since 1970, there has been an increase in stratification in the upper ocean due to global warming and, in some areas, salinity changes. The salinity changes are caused by evaporation in tropical waters, which results in higher salinity and density levels. Meanwhile, melting ice can cause a decrease in salinity at higher latitudes.

Temperature, salinity and pressure all influence water density. As surface waters are often warmer than deep waters, they are less dense, resulting in stratification. This stratification is crucial not just in the production of the Atlantic Meridional Overturning Circulation, which has worldwide weather and climate ramifications, but it is also significant because stratification controls the movement of nutrients from deep water to the surface. This increases ocean productivity and is associated with the compensatory downward flow of water that carries oxygen from the atmosphere and surface waters into the deep sea.

=== Reduced oxygen levels ===
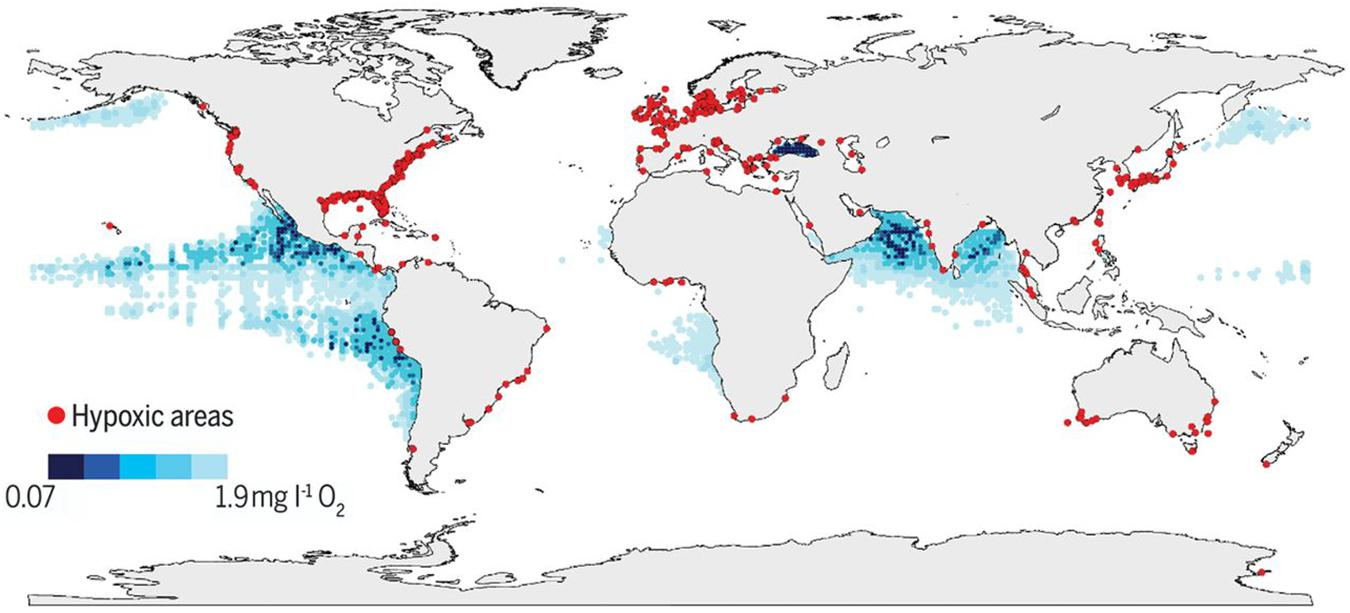
Global map of low and declining oxygen levels in the open ocean and coastal waters. The map indicates coastal sites where anthropogenic nutrients have resulted in oxygen declines to less than 2 mg L^{–1} (red dots), as well as ocean oxygen minimum zones at 300 metres (blue shaded regions).

Climate change has an impact on ocean oxygen, both in coastal areas and in the open ocean.

The open ocean naturally has some areas of low oxygen, known as oxygen minimum zones. These areas are isolated from the atmospheric oxygen by sluggish ocean circulation. At the same time, oxygen is consumed when sinking organic matter from surface waters is broken down. These low oxygen ocean areas are expanding as a result of ocean warming which both reduces water circulation and also reduces the oxygen content of that water, while the solubility of oxygen declines as the temperature rises.

Overall ocean oxygen concentrations are estimated to have declined 2% over 50 years from the 1960s. The nature of the ocean circulation means that in general these low oxygen regions are more pronounced in the Pacific Ocean. Low oxygen represents a stress for almost all marine animals. Very low oxygen levels create regions with much reduced fauna. It is predicted that these low oxygen zones will expand in future due to climate change, and this represents a serious threat to marine life in these oxygen minimum zones.

The second area of concern relates to coastal waters where increasing nutrient supply from rivers to coastal areas leads to increasing production and sinking organic matter which in some coastal regions leads to extreme oxygen depletion, sometimes referred to as dead zones. These dead zones are expanding driven particularly by increasing nutrient inputs, but also compounded by increasing ocean stratification driven by climate change.

=== Oceans turning green ===
Satellite image analysis reveals that the oceans have been gradually turning more green as climate change continues. The color change has been detected for a majority of the world's ocean surfaces and may be due to changing plankton populations caused by climate change. There is evidence that this in turn may be leading to widespread ocean darkening where changes to the optical properties of the water is preventing light from penetrating to greater depth.

=== Changes to Earth's weather system and wind patterns ===
Climate change and the associated warming of the ocean will lead to widespread changes to the Earth's climate and weather system including increased tropical cyclone and monsoon intensities and weather extremes with some areas becoming wetter and others drier. Changing wind patterns are predicted to increase wave heights in some areas.

==== Intensifying tropical cyclones ====
Human-induced climate change "continues to warm the oceans which provide the memory of past accumulated effects". The result is a higher ocean heat content and higher sea surface temperatures. In turn, this "invigorates tropical cyclones to make them more intense, bigger, longer lasting and greatly increases their flooding rains". One example is Hurricane Harvey in 2017.

Climate change affects tropical cyclones in a variety of ways: an intensification of rainfall and wind speed, an increase in the frequency of very intense storms and a poleward extension of where the cyclones reach maximum intensity are among the consequences of human-induced climate change. Tropical cyclones use warm, moist air as their source of energy or fuel. As climate change is warming ocean temperatures, there is potentially more of this fuel available.

Between 1979 and 2017, there was a global increase in the proportion of tropical cyclones of Category 3 and higher on the Saffir–Simpson scale. The trend was most clear in the north Indian Ocean, North Atlantic and in the Southern Indian Ocean. In the north Indian Ocean, particularly the Arabian Sea, the frequency, duration, and intensity of cyclones have increased significantly. There has been a 52% increase in the number of cyclones in the Arabian Sea, while the number of very severe cyclones have increased by 150%, during 1982–2019. Meanwhile, the total duration of cyclones in the Arabian Sea has increased by 80% while that of very severe cyclones has increased by 260%. In the North Pacific, tropical cyclones have been moving poleward into colder waters and there was no increase in intensity over this period. With 2 °C (3.6 °F) warming, a greater percentage (+13%) of tropical cyclones are expected to reach Category 4 and 5 strength. A 2019 study indicates that climate change has been driving the observed trend of rapid intensification of tropical cyclones in the Atlantic basin. Rapidly intensifying cyclones are hard to forecast and therefore pose additional risk to coastal communities.

==== Destabilization of the South Asian Monsoon ====
Since 1950s, the South Asian summer monsoon has been exhibiting large changes, especially in terms of droughts and floods. The observed monsoon rainfall indicates a gradual decline over central India, with a reduction of up to 10%. This is primarily due to a weakening monsoon circulation as a result of the rapid warming in the Indian Ocean, and changes in land use and land cover, while the role of aerosols remains elusive. Since the strength of the monsoon is partially dependent on the temperature difference between the ocean and the land, higher ocean temperatures in the Indian Ocean have weakened the moisture bearing winds from the ocean to the land. The reduction in the summer monsoon rainfall has grave consequences over central India because at least 60% of the agriculture in this region is still largely rain-fed.

A recent assessment of the monsoonal changes indicates that the land warming has increased during 2002–2014, possibly reviving the strength of the monsoon circulation and rainfall. Future changes in the monsoon will depend on a competition between land and ocean—on which is warming faster than the other.

Meanwhile, there has been a three-fold rise in widespread extreme rainfall events during the years 1950 to 2015, over the entire central belt of India, leading to a steady rise in the number of flash floods with significant socioeconomic losses. Widespread extreme rainfall events are those rainfall events which are larger than 150 mm/day and spread over a region large enough to cause floods.

=== Salinity changes ===
Due to global warming and increased glacier melt, thermohaline circulation patterns may be altered by increasing amounts of freshwater released into oceans and, therefore, changing ocean salinity. Thermohaline circulation is responsible for bringing up cold, nutrient-rich water from the depths of the ocean, a process known as upwelling.

Seawater consists of fresh water and salt, and the concentration of salt in seawater is called salinity. Salt does not evaporate, thus the precipitation and evaporation of freshwater influences salinity strongly. Changes in the water cycle are therefore strongly visible in surface salinity measurements, which has been known since the 1930s.

The long term observation records show a clear trend: the global salinity patterns are amplifying in this period. This means that the high saline regions have become more saline, and regions of low salinity have become less saline. The regions of high salinity are dominated by evaporation, and the increase in salinity shows that evaporation is increasing even more. The same goes for regions of low salinity that are becoming less saline, which indicates that precipitation is becoming more intensified.

=== Sea ice decline and changes ===
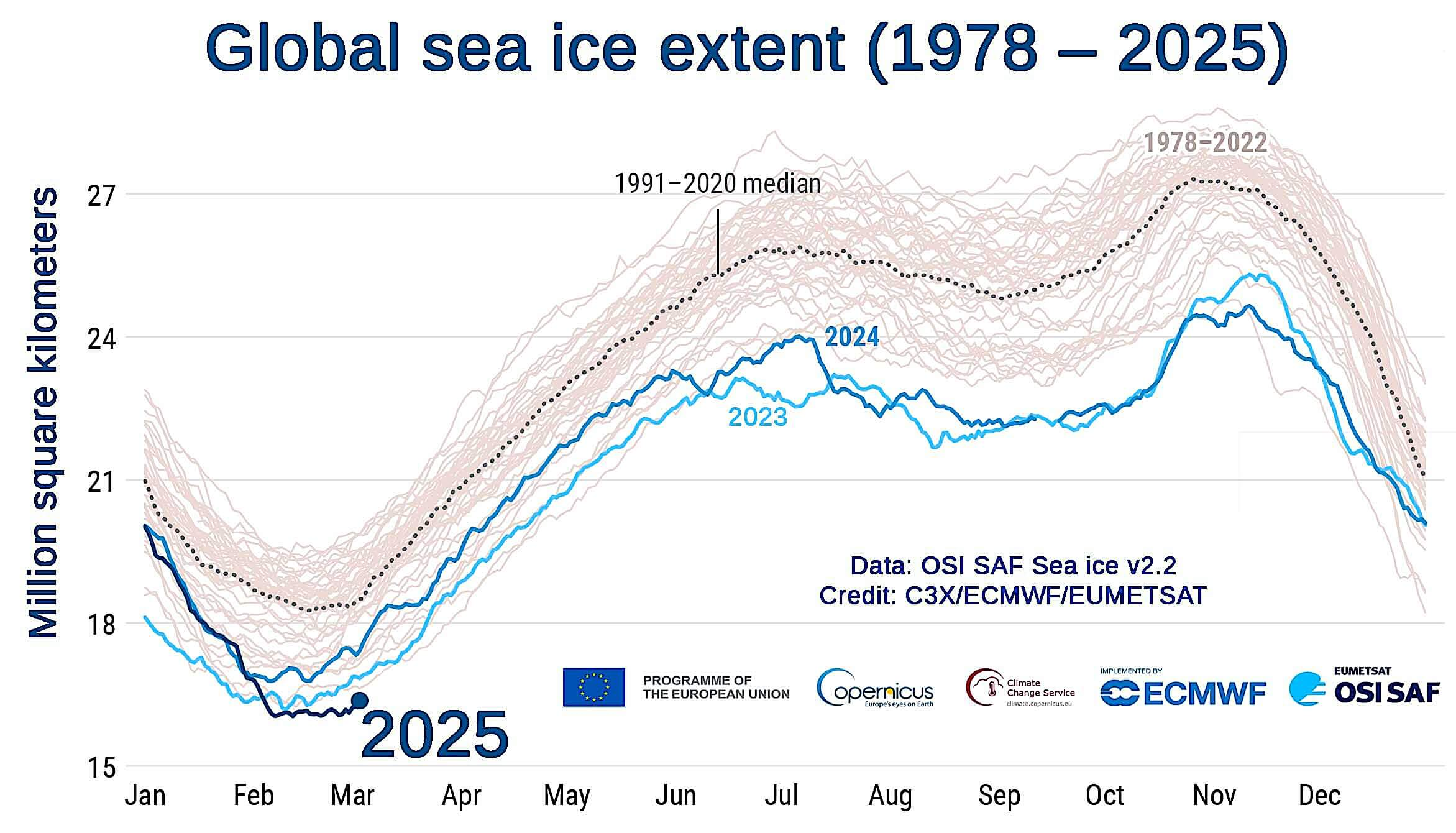
Global sea ice extent, which combines the sea ice extents in both polar regions, reached a new all-time minimum in February 2025.

Effects of climate change on sea ice vary with the seasons. Rates of ice loss, in the same month over years since 1979, are more than twice as great in September as in May.

Sea ice loss seen in March—at -2.2% per decade—is moderate compared to the extreme loss rates experienced in May and September (adjacent chart).

Sea ice decline occurs more in the Arctic than in Antarctica, where it is more a matter of changing sea ice conditions.

Sea ice in the Arctic region has declined in recent decades in area and volume due to climate change. It has been melting more in summer than it refreezes in winter. Global warming, caused by greenhouse gas forcing is responsible for the decline in Arctic sea ice. The decline of sea ice in the Arctic has been accelerating during the early twenty-first century, with a decline rate of 4.7% per decade (it has declined over 50% since the first satellite records). Summertime sea ice will likely cease to exist sometime during the 21st century.

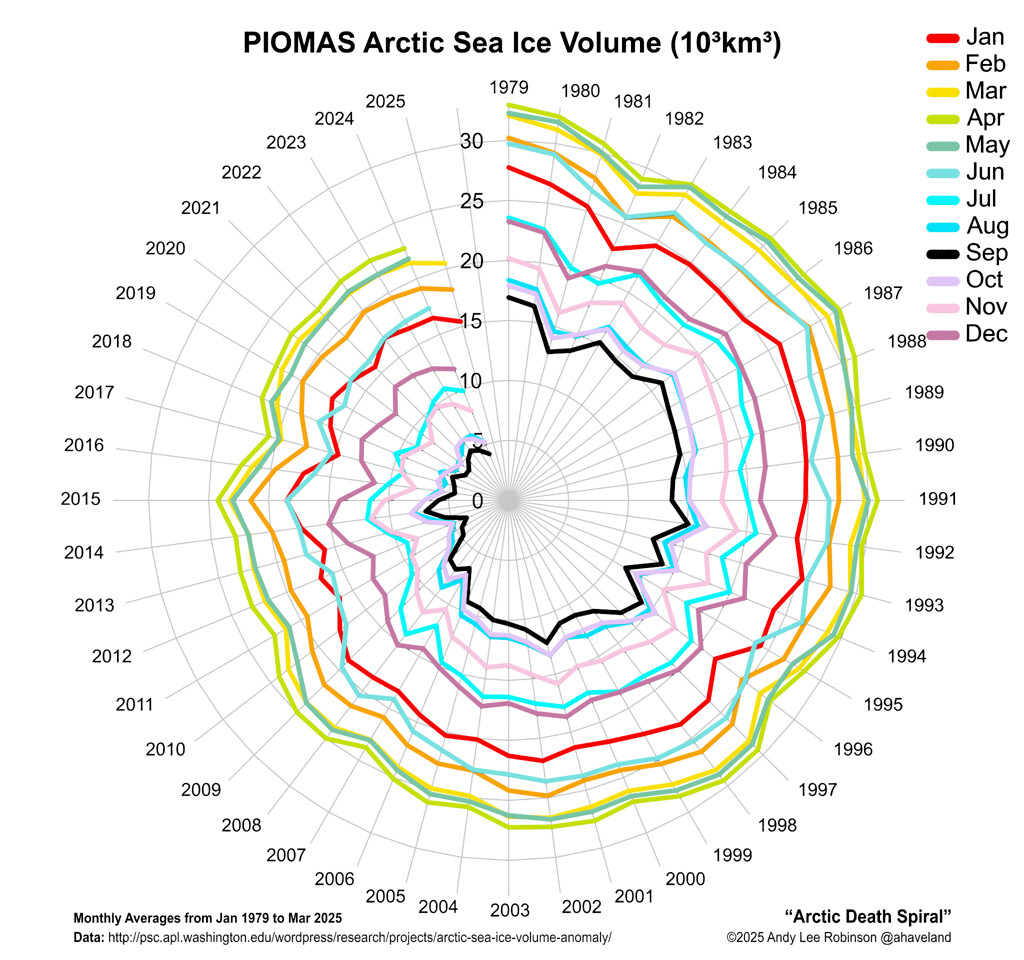
Month-by-month chart shows how minimum ice volume usually occurs in September, and maxima usually occurring in April.

Decade-by-decade progression of arctic sea ice melting shows continued ice loss, with the greatest percentage loss rate experienced in the late summer and early autumn.

Sea ice extent in Antarctica varies a lot year by year. This makes it difficult determine a trend, and record highs and record lows have been observed between 2013 and 2023. The general trend since November 1978, the start of the satellite measurements, has been roughly flat, with two distinct change points. From November 1978 to August 2007, the mean sea ice extent anomaly was close to zero. This was followed by a period of positive anomalies from September 2007 to August 2016, and a subsequent shift to predominantly negative anomalies that continues to the present. Statistical analyses show that the Antarctic sea ice system has undergone a structural change that is indicative of a regime shift in the system's behaviour. The decline in Antarctic sea ice since 2016 has been accompanied by increased upper ocean heat content, suggesting an oceanic influence on the observed loss. This reduction in sea ice appears to be primarily driven by thermodynamic processes, rather than by mechanical advection. One such possible contributing factor is a persistent zonal wave number 3 pattern that was present from early winter through spring, since it indicates enhanced meridional flow.

== Impacts on biological processes ==
Examples of projected impacts and vulnerabilities for fisheries associated with climate change

=== Ocean productivity ===
The process of photosynthesis in the surface ocean releases oxygen and consumes carbon dioxide. This photosynthesis in the ocean is dominated by phytoplankton – microscopic free-floating algae. After the plants grow, bacterial decomposition of the organic matter formed by photosynthesis in the ocean consumes oxygen and releases carbon dioxide. The sinking and bacterial decomposition of some organic matter in deep ocean water, at depths where the waters are out of contact with the atmosphere, leads to a reduction in oxygen concentrations and increase in carbon dioxide, carbonate and bicarbonate. This cycling of carbon dioxide in oceans is an important part of the global carbon cycle.

The photosynthesis in surface waters consumes nutrients (e.g. nitrogen and phosphorus) and transfers these nutrients to deep water as the organic matter produced by photosynthesis sinks upon the death of the organisms. Productivity in surface waters therefore depends in part on the transfer of nutrients from deep water back to the surface by ocean mixing and currents. The increasing stratification of the oceans due to climate change therefore acts generally to reduce ocean productivity. However, in some areas, such as previously ice covered regions, productivity may increase. This trend is already observable and is projected to continue under current projected climate change. In the Indian Ocean for example, productivity is estimated to have declined over the past sixty years due to climate warming and is projected to continue.

Ocean productivity under a very high emission scenario (RCP8.5) is very likely to drop by 4-11% by 2100. The decline will show regional variations. For example, the tropical ocean NPP will decline more: by 7–16% for the same emissions scenario. Less organic matter will likely sink from the upper oceans into deeper ocean layers due to increased ocean stratification and a reduction in nutrient supply. The reduction in ocean productivity is due to the "combined effects of warming, stratification, light, nutrients and predation".

=== Calcifying organisms and ocean acidification ===
The full ecological consequences of the changes in calcification due to ocean acidification are complex but it appears likely that many calcifying species will be adversely affected by ocean acidification. Increasing ocean acidification makes it more difficult for shell-accreting organisms to access carbonate ions, essential for the production of their hard exoskeletal shell. Oceanic calcifying organism span the food chain from autotrophs to heterotrophs and include organisms such as coccolithophores, corals, foraminifera, echinoderms, crustaceans, and molluscs.

Overall, all marine ecosystems on Earth will be exposed to changes in acidification and several other ocean biogeochemical changes. Ocean acidification may force some organisms to reallocate resources away from productive endpoints in order to maintain calcification. For example, the oyster Magallana gigas is recognized to experience metabolic changes alongside altered calcification rates due to energetic tradeoffs resulting from pH imbalances.

=== Harmful algal blooms ===
Although the drivers of harmful algal blooms (HABs) are poorly understood, they appear to have increased in range and frequency in coastal areas since the 1980s. This is the result of human induced factors such as increased nutrient inputs (nutrient pollution) and climate change (in particular the warming of water temperatures). The parameters that affect the formation of HABs are ocean warming, marine heatwaves, oxygen loss, eutrophication and water pollution. These increases in HABs are of concern because of the impact of their occurrence on local food security, tourism and the economy.

It is however also possible that the perceived increase in HABs globally is simply due to more severe bloom impacts and better monitoring and not due to climate change.

== Impacts on coral reefs and fisheries ==
=== Coral reefs ===
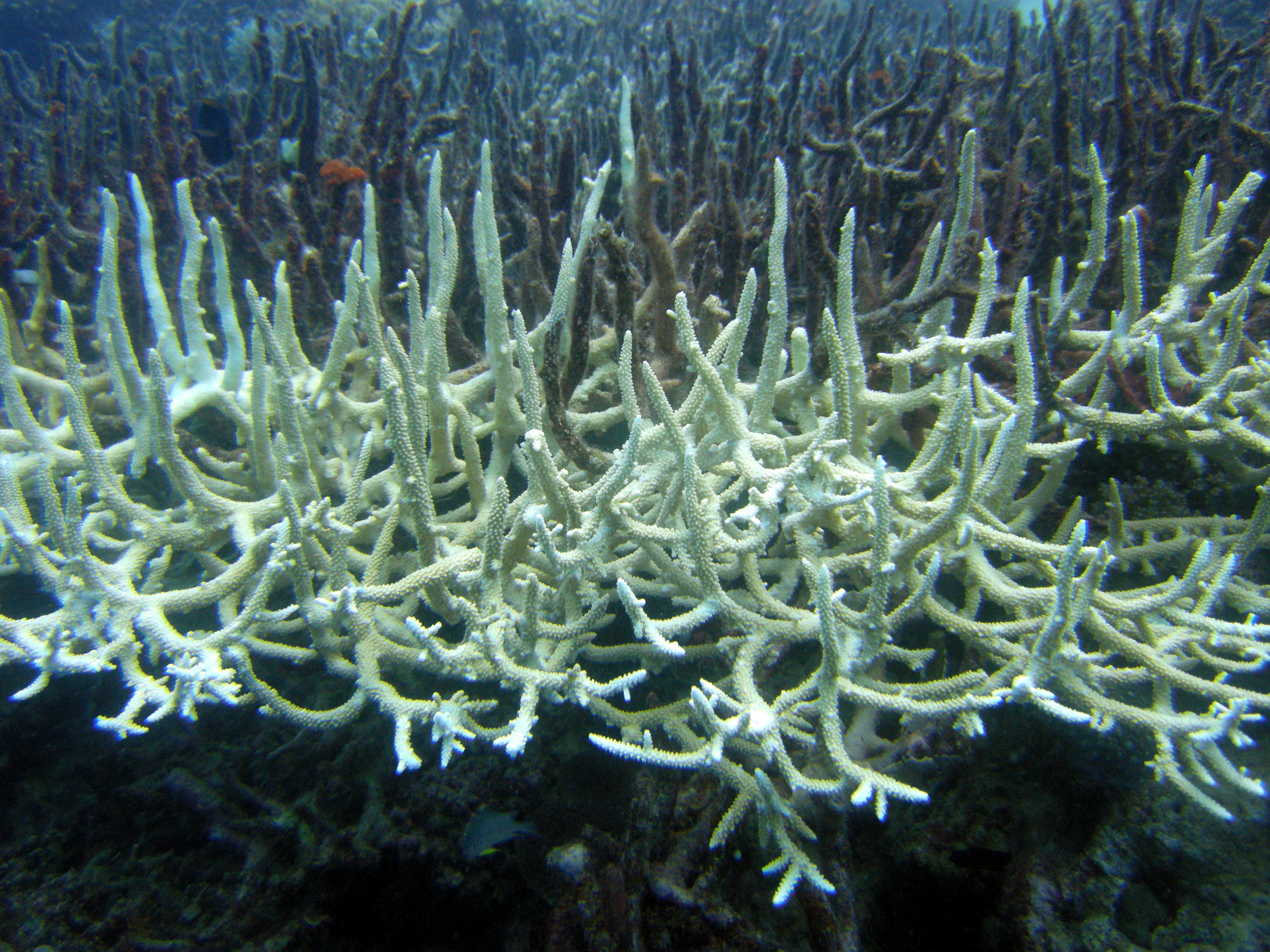
Bleached Staghorn coral in the Great Barrier Reef.

While some mobile marine species can migrate in response to climate change, others such as corals find this much more difficult. A coral reef is an underwater ecosystem characterised by reef-building corals. Reefs are formed by colonies of coral polyps held together by calcium carbonate. Coral reefs are important centres of biodiversity and vital to millions of people who rely on them for coastal protection, food and for sustaining tourism in many regions.

Warm water corals are clearly in decline, with losses of 50% over the last 30–50 years due to multiple threats from ocean warming, ocean acidification, pollution and physical damage from activities such as fishing. These pressures are expected to intensify.

The warming ocean surface waters can lead to bleaching of the corals which can cause serious damage and/or coral death. The IPCC Sixth Assessment Report in 2022 found that: "Since the early 1980s, the frequency and severity of mass coral bleaching events have increased sharply worldwide". Marine heatwaves have caused coral reef mass mortality. It is expected that many coral reefs will suffer irreversible changes and loss due to marine heatwaves with global temperatures increasing by more than 1.5 °C.

Coral bleaching occurs when thermal stress from a warming ocean results in the expulsion of the symbiotic algae that resides within coral tissues. These symbiotic algae are the reason for the bright, vibrant colors of coral reefs. A 1-2 °C sustained increase in seawater temperatures is sufficient for bleaching to occur, which turns corals white. If a coral is bleached for a prolonged period of time, death may result. In the Great Barrier Reef, before 1998 there were no such events. The first event happened in 1998 and after that, they began to occur more frequently. Between 2016 and 2020 there were three of them.

Apart from coral bleaching, the reducing pH value in oceans is also a problem for coral reefs because ocean acidification reduces coralline algal biodiversity. The physiology of coralline algal calcification determines how the algae will respond to ocean acidification.

Warm water corals are clearly in decline, with losses of 50% over the last 30–50 years due to multiple threats from ocean warming, ocean acidification, pollution, and physical damage from activities such as fishing, and these pressures are expected to intensify.

The fluid in the internal compartments (the coelenteron) where corals grow their exoskeleton is also extremely important for calcification growth. When the saturation state of aragonite in the external seawater is at ambient levels, the corals will grow their aragonite crystals rapidly in their internal compartments, hence their exoskeleton grows rapidly. If the saturation state of aragonite in the external seawater is lower than the ambient level, the corals have to work harder to maintain the right balance in the internal compartment. When that happens, the process of growing the crystals slows down, and this slows down the rate of how much their exoskeleton is growing. Depending on the aragonite saturation state in the surrounding water, the corals may halt growth because pumping aragonite into the internal compartment will not be energetically favorable. Under the current progression of carbon emissions, around 70% of North Atlantic cold-water corals will be living in corrosive waters by 2050–60.

=== Effects on fisheries ===
Fisheries are affected by climate change in many ways: marine aquatic ecosystems are being affected by rising ocean temperatures, ocean acidification and ocean deoxygenation, while freshwater ecosystems are being impacted by changes in water temperature, water flow, and fish habitat loss. These effects vary in the context of each fishery. Climate change is modifying fish distributions and the productivity of marine and freshwater species. Climate change is expected to lead to significant changes in the availability and trade of fish products. The geopolitical and economic consequences will be significant, especially for the countries most dependent on the sector. The biggest decreases in maximum catch potential can be expected in the tropics, mostly in the South Pacific regions.

The impacts of climate change on ocean systems has impacts on the sustainability of fisheries and aquaculture, on the livelihoods of the communities that depend on fisheries, and on the ability of the oceans to capture and store carbon (biological pump). The effect of sea level rise means that coastal fishing communities are significantly impacted by climate change, while changing rainfall patterns and water use impact on inland freshwater fisheries and aquaculture. Increased risks of floods, diseases, parasites and harmful algal blooms are climate change impacts on aquaculture which can lead to losses of production and infrastructure.

It is projected that "climate change decreases the modelled global fish community biomass by as much as 30% by 2100".

== Impacts on marine mammals ==
=== Regions and habitats particularly affected ===
Some effects on marine mammals, especially those in the Arctic, are very direct such as loss of habitat, temperature stress, and exposure to severe weather. Other effects are more indirect, such as changes in host pathogen associations, changes in body condition because of predator–prey interaction, changes in exposure to toxins and CO_{2} emissions, and increased human interactions. Despite the large potential impacts of ocean warming on marine mammals, the global vulnerability of marine mammals to global warming is still poorly understood.

Marine mammals have evolved to live in oceans, but climate change is affecting their natural habitat. Some species may not adapt fast enough, which might lead to their extinction.

It has been generally assumed that the Arctic marine mammals were the most vulnerable in the face of climate change given the substantial observed and projected decline in Arctic sea ice. However, research has shown that the North Pacific Ocean, the Greenland Sea and the Barents Sea host the species that are most vulnerable to global warming. The North Pacific has already been identified as a hotspot for human threats for marine mammals and is now also a hotspot for vulnerability to global warming. Marine mammals in this region will face double jeopardy from both human activities (e.g., marine traffic, pollution and offshore oil and gas development) and global warming, with potential additive or synergetic effects. As a result, these ecosystems face irreversible consequences for marine ecosystem functioning.

Marine organisms usually tend to encounter relatively stable temperatures compared to terrestrial species and thus are likely to be more sensitive to temperature change than terrestrial organisms. Therefore, the ocean warming will lead to the migration of increased species, as endangered species look for a more suitable habitat. If sea temperatures continue to rise, then some fauna may move to cooler water and some range-edge species may disappear from regional waters or experience a reduced global range. Change in the abundance of some species will alter the food resources available to marine mammals, which then results in marine mammals' biogeographic shifts. Furthermore, if a species is unable to successfully migrate to a suitable environment, it will be at risk of extinction if it cannot adapt to rising temperatures of the ocean.

Arctic sea ice decline leads to loss of the sea ice habitat, elevations of water and air temperature, and increased occurrence of severe weather. The loss of sea ice habitat will reduce the abundance of seal prey for marine mammals, particularly polar bears. Sea ice changes may also have indirect effects on animal health due to changes in the transmission of pathogens, impacts on animals' body condition due to shifts in the prey-based food web, and increased exposure to toxicants as a result of increased human habitation in the Arctic habitat.

Sea level rise is also important when assessing the impacts of global warming on marine mammals, since it affects coastal environments that marine mammal species rely on.

=== Polar bears ===
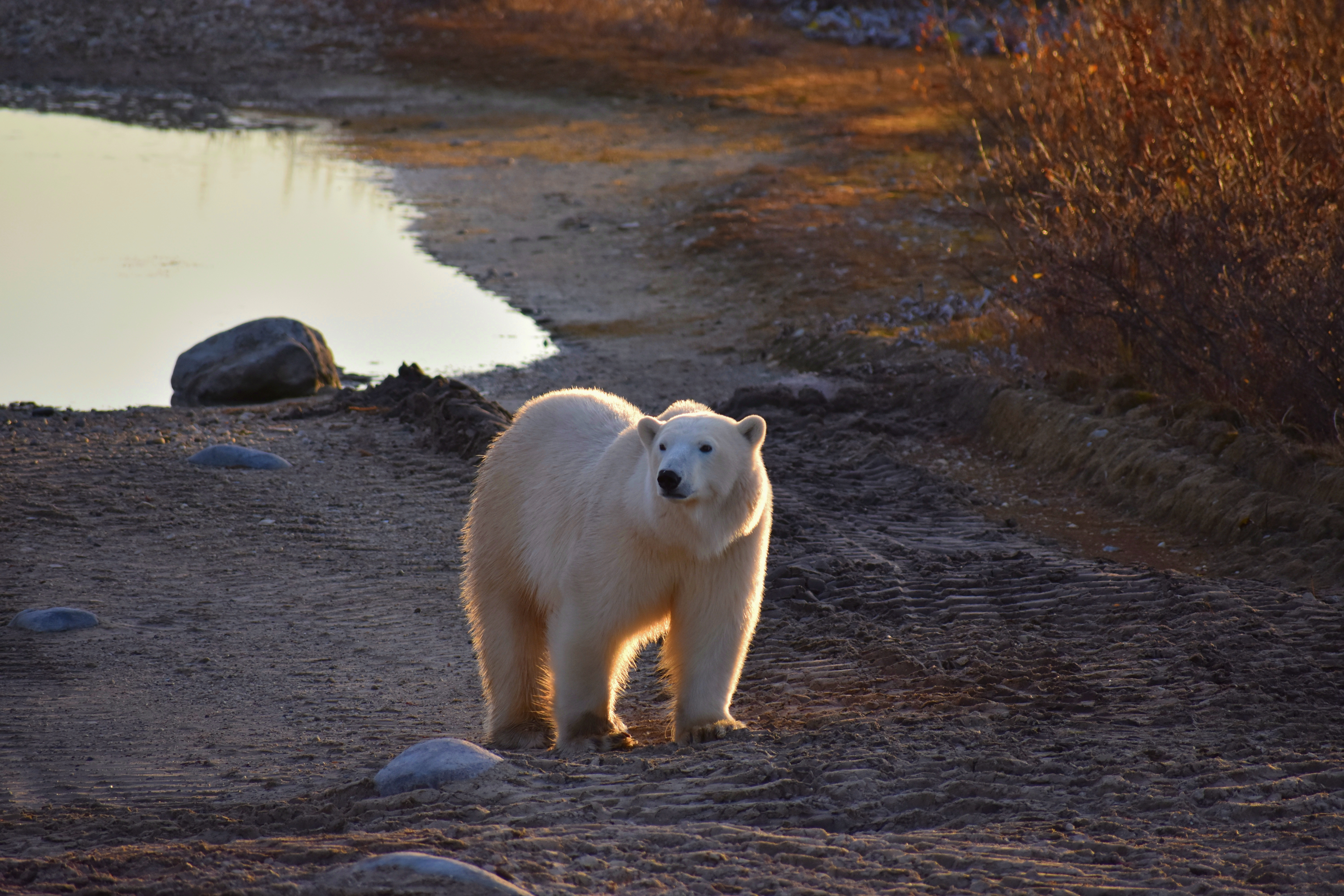
A polar bear waiting in the Fall for the sea ice to form.

=== Seals ===
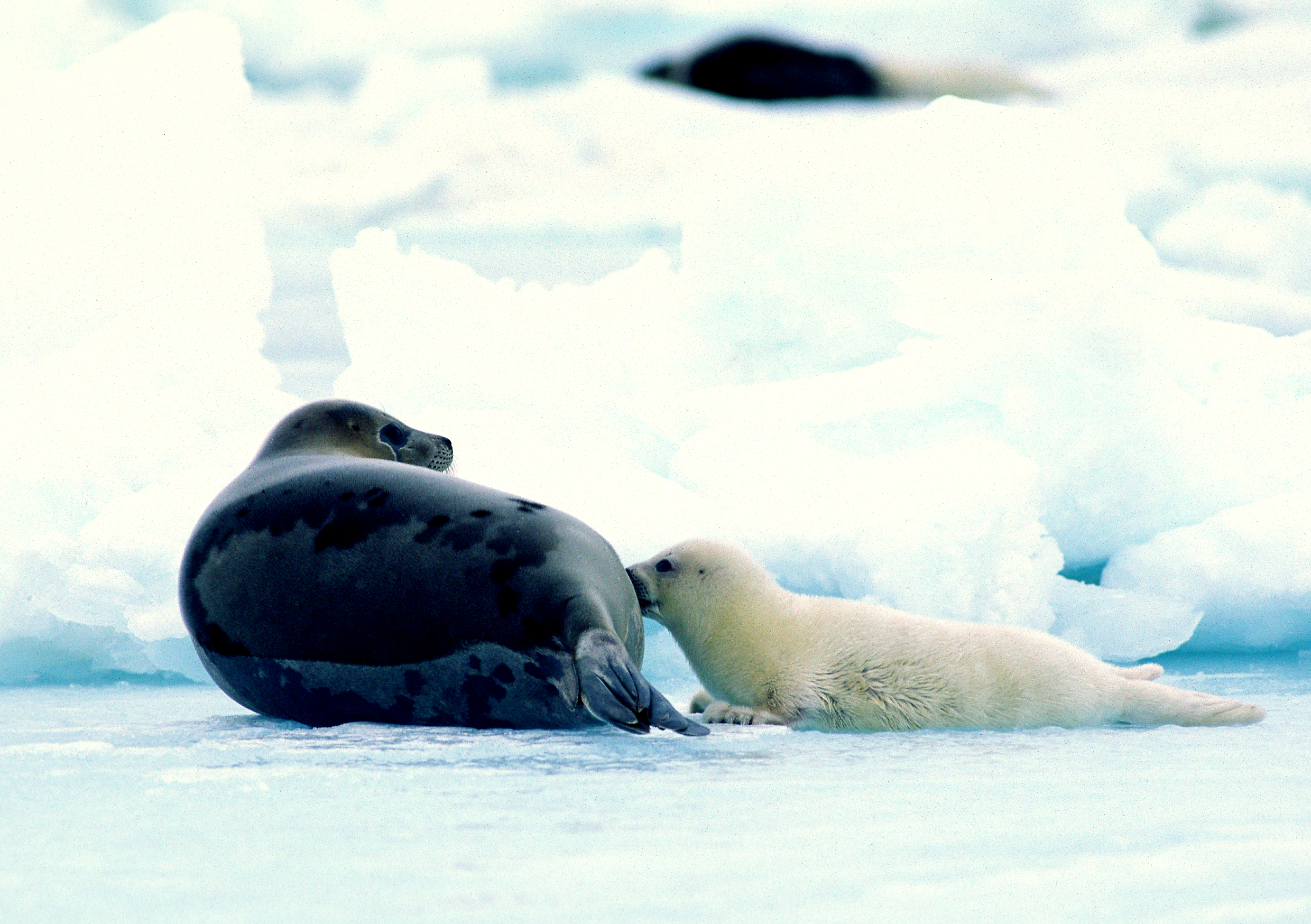
Harp seal mother nursing pup on sea ice

Seals are another marine mammal that are susceptible to climate change. Much like polar bears, some seal species have evolved to rely on sea ice. They use the ice platforms for breeding and raising young seal pups. In 2010 and 2011, sea ice in the Northwest Atlantic was at or near an all-time low and harp seals as well as ringed seals that bred on thin ice saw increased death rates. Antarctic fur seals in South Georgia in the South Atlantic Ocean saw extreme reductions over a 20-year study, during which scientists measured increased sea surface temperature anomalies.

=== Dolphins ===
Climate change has had a significant impact on various dolphin species. For example: In the Mediterranean, increased sea surface temperatures, salinity, upwelling intensity, and sea levels have led to a reduction in prey resources, causing a steep decline in the short-beaked common dolphin subpopulation in the Mediterranean, which was classified as endangered in 2003. At the Shark Bay World Heritage Area in Western Australia, the local population of the Indo-Pacific bottlenose dolphin had a significant decline following a marine heatwave in 2011. River dolphins are highly affected by climate change as high evaporation rates, increased water temperatures, decreased precipitation, and increased acidification occur.

Dolphins are marine mammals with broad geographic extent, making them susceptible to climate change in various ways. The most common effect of climate change on dolphins is the increasing water temperatures across the globe. This has caused a large variety of dolphin species to experience range shifts, in which the species move from their typical geographic region to cooler waters. Another side effect of increasing water temperatures is the increase in harmful algae blooms, which has caused a mass die-off of bottlenose dolphins.

=== North Atlantic right whales ===
Anthropogenic climate change poses a clear and growing threat to right whales. Documented effects in the scientific literature include impacts on reproduction, range, prey access, interactions with human activities, and individual health condition.

Climate-driven changes to ocean circulation and water temperatures have affected the species' foraging and habitat use patterns, with numerous harmful consequences. Warming waters lead to decreased abundance of an important prey species, the zooplankton Calanus finmarchicus. This reduction in prey availability affects the health of the right whale population in numerous ways. The most direct impacts are on the survival and reproductive success of individual whales, as lower C. finmarchicus densities have been associated with malnutrition-related health issues and difficulties successfully giving birth to and rearing calves.

== Potential feedback effects ==
=== Methane release from methane clathrate ===
Rising ocean temperatures also have the potential to impact methane clathrate reservoirs located under the ocean floor sediments. These trap large amounts of the greenhouse gas methane, which ocean warming has the potential to release. However, it is currently considered unlikely that gas clathrates (mostly methane) in subsea clathrates will lead to a "detectable departure from the emissions trajectory during this century".

In 2004 the global inventory of ocean methane clathrates was estimated to occupy between one and five million cubic kilometres.

== See also ==
- Blue carbon
- Carbon sequestration
- Effects of climate change on island nations
- Effects of climate change on the water cycle
- Special Report on the Ocean and Cryosphere in a Changing Climate (2019)
