= LSW =

LSW may stand for:

== Places ==
- Landessternwarte Heidelberg-Königstuhl, a historic astronomical observatory operated by the Ruprecht Karl University of Heidelberg in Germany
- Leasowe railway station, a railway station in England
- Lee's Summit West High School, a high school in Lee's Summit, Missouri
- Lincoln Southwest High School, a high school in Lincoln, Nebraska
- Labrador Sea Water, part of the North Atlantic Deep Water water mass
- Malikus Saleh Airport IATA code

== Organizations ==
- Liberty Seguros-Würth team, a cycling team active in Tour de France
- Logistics Support Wing, one of three support wings of the Australian Air Force Cadets
- London and South Western Railway, a railway company operating in England from 1838 to 1922

== Other ==
- Dragon Ball Z: Legendary Super Warriors, a Game Boy Color game and style used in sprite editing
- Lego Star Wars, a Lego theme which incorporates the Star Wars saga
- Light Support Weapon, a type of assault rifle
- Land Slide Warning, an alert type in the United States Emergency Alert System
- Licensed Social Worker
- LSW Vision-Smalltalk, a commercial implementation of the Smalltalk language and development environment for Windows
