= Cold blob =

Cold temperature anomaly North Atlantic surface waters

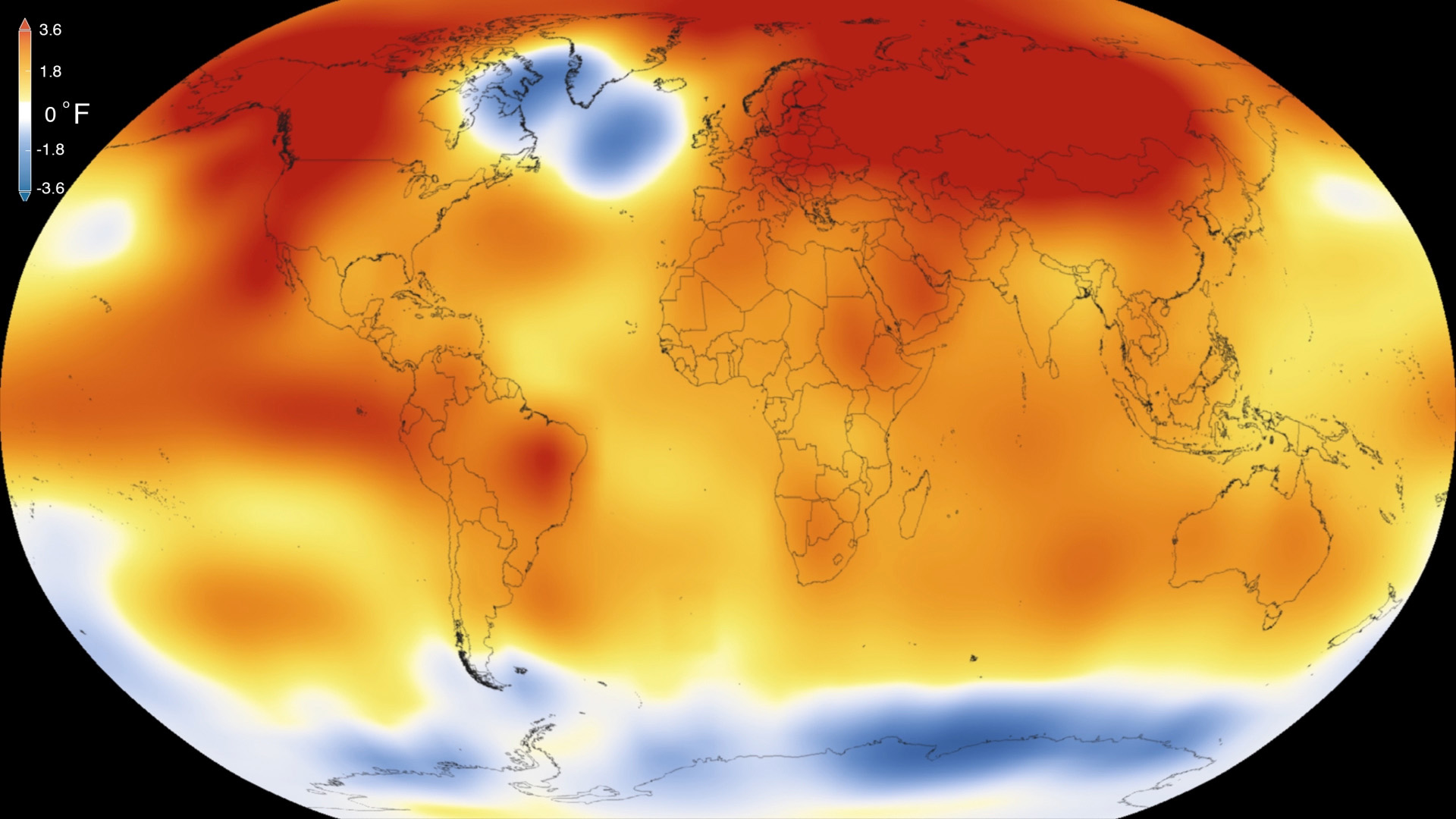
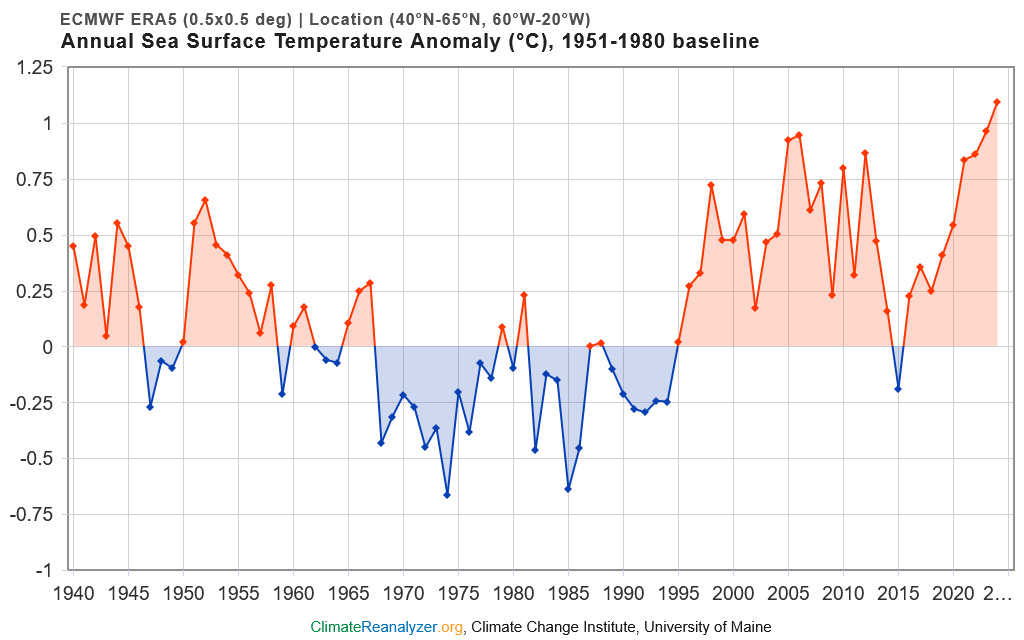
Top: The cold blob visible on NASA's global mean temperatures for 2015, then the warmest year in NASA's temperature series – colors indicate temperature anomalies (NASA/NOAA; 20 January 2016).
Bottom: Annual sea surface temperature anomalies from 1940 to 2024, in the region 40°N-65°N, 60°W-20°W roughly corresponding to the 2015 extent of the "cold blob"

The cold blob in the North Atlantic (also called the North Atlantic warming hole) is a cold temperature anomaly of the surface waters at a region in the North Atlantic Ocean south of Greenland, affecting the Atlantic meridional overturning circulation (AMOC) which is part of the thermohaline circulation, possibly related to global warming-induced melting of the Greenland ice sheet. It is the largest structurally anomalous cold oceanic region on Earth.

== Discovery ==
In 2005, British researchers noticed that the net flow of the northern Gulf Stream had decreased by about 30% since 1957. Coincidentally, scientists at Woods Hole in Massachusetts had been measuring the freshening of the North Atlantic as Earth becomes warmer. Their findings suggested that precipitation increases in the high northern latitudes, and polar ice melts as a consequence. By flooding the northern seas with excessive fresh water, global warming could, in theory, divert the Gulf Stream waters that usually flow northward, past the British Isles and Norway, and cause them to instead circulate toward the equator. Were this to happen, Europe's climate would be seriously impacted.

Don Chambers from the USF College of Marine Science mentioned, "The major effect of a slowing AMOC is expected to be cooler winters and summers around the North Atlantic, and small regional increases in sea level on the North American coast." James Hansen and Makiko Sato stated, "AMOC slowdown that causes cooling ~1°C and perhaps affects weather patterns is very different from an AMOC shutdown that cools the North Atlantic several degrees Celsius; the latter would have dramatic effects on storms and be irreversible on the century time scale." Downturn of the Atlantic meridional overturning circulation has been tied to extreme regional sea level rise.

== Cause ==
AMOC is driven by ocean temperature and salinity differences. The major possible mechanism causing the cold ocean surface temperature anomaly is based on the fact that freshwater decreases ocean water salinity, and the colder surface waters cannot sink because they are less dense than the saltier waters underneath them. The observed freshwater increase probably originates from Greenland ice melt.

== Research ==
AMOC-Index since 900 CE with pronounced slowdown since ~1850; Rahmstorf et al. (2015)

Climate scientists Michael Mann of Penn State and Stefan Rahmstorf from the Potsdam Institute for Climate Impact Research suggested that the observed cold pattern during years of temperature records is a sign that the Atlantic Ocean's Meridional overturning circulation (AMOC) may be weakening. They published their findings, and concluded that the AMOC circulation shows exceptional slowdown in the last century, and that Greenland melt is a possible contributor. Tom Delworth of NOAA suggested that natural variability, which includes different modes, here namely the North Atlantic Oscillation and the Atlantic Multidecadal Oscillation through wind driven ocean temperatures are also a factor. A 2014 study by Jon Robson et al. from the University of Reading concluded about the anomaly, "...suggest that a substantial change in the AMOC is unfolding now." Another study by Didier Swingedouw concluded that the slowdown of AMOC in the 1970s may have been unprecedented over the last millennium.

A study published in 2016, by researchers from the University of South Florida, Canada and the Netherlands, used GRACE satellite data to estimate freshwater flux from Greenland. They concluded that freshwater runoff is accelerating, and could eventually cause a disruption of AMOC in the future, which would affect Europe and North America.

Another study published in 2016, found further evidence for a considerable impact from sea level rise for the U.S. East Coast. The study confirms earlier research findings which identified the region as a hotspot for rising seas, with a potential to divert 3–4 times higher than the global average sea level rise rate. The researchers attribute the possible increase to an ocean circulation mechanism called deep water formation, which is reduced due to AMOC slow down, leading to more warmer water pockets below the surface. Additionally, the study noted: "Our results suggest that higher carbon emission rates also contribute to increased [sea level rise] in this region compared to the global average".

Since 2004 the RAPID program has been monitoring ocean circulation.

== See also ==
- Abrupt climate change
- The Blob (Pacific Ocean)
- Deglaciation
- Physical impacts of climate change
