= Labrador Sea Water =

Water mass formed by convective processes in the Labrador Sea

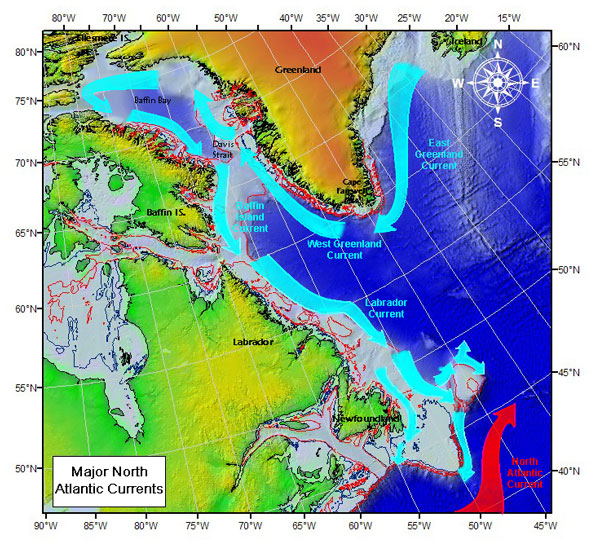
Map of Labrador Current

Labrador Sea Water is an intermediate water mass in the Labrador Sea. It is characterized by cold water, relatively low salinity compared to other intermediate water masses, and high concentrations of both oxygen and anthropogenic tracers. It is formed by convective processes located between Greenland and the northeast coast of the Labrador Peninsula. Deep convection in the Labrador Sea allows colder water to sink forming this water mass, which is a contributor to the upper layer of North Atlantic Deep Water. North Atlantic Deep Water flowing southward is integral to the Atlantic Meridional Overturning Circulation. The Labrador Sea experiences a net heat loss to the atmosphere annually.

== Formation ==
Convection in the Labrador Sea is the result of cyclonic circulation of the sea currents and cyclonic atmospheric forcing. At the southern tip of Greenland, water enters the West Greenland Current from the East Greenland Current, continues to flow northwest around Baffin Bay, and then southeast into the Baffin Island Current, continuing in the same direction in the Labrador Current. Sea ice in the winter months inhibits surface flow into Baffin Bay. The Labrador Current and the Western Greenland Current flow in opposite directions, creating a cyclonic eddy. During winter months low pressure dominates in this region, and in years with a positive North Atlantic Oscillation deeper convection is observed.

== Spreading ==
Labrador Sea Water spreads through the North Atlantic Ocean by three routes: northeast directly into Irminger Sea, into the eastern North Atlantic by means of the deep North Atlantic current, and meridionally via the Deep Western Boundary Current. A 2002 study presented data that suggest that the Labrador Sea is not the only formation site for Labrador Sea Water. They observed similar convective processes in Irminger Sea and noted that transit times for Labrador Sea Water into Irminger Sea were unusually fast, suggesting Irminger Sea as another source.

== Seasonality ==
Labrador Sea Water reflects seasonal and interannual variations. In late spring and summer, large amounts of cold freshwater accumulate from melting ice and are mixed downward during convection. The source for heat in the Labrador Sea is modified North Atlantic Current water after circulating the subpolar gyre. In winter the sea becomes more saline as freshwater freezes to form sea ice. The greatest seasonal variability is largely confined to the surface waters, however an annual cycle of convective mixing and re-stratification is observed throughout the water column. Warming and increased salinity in the lower level and freshening at the surface is associated with re-stratification (May–December), whereas a convective mixing period (January–April) leads to cooling and a decrease in salt content in intermediate and deep waters and an increase in salt content at the surface. Interannual variations in the intermediate Labrador Sea Water are due largely to changes in convection throughout these periods. Weak convective periods are associated with more heat in the water column and deep convective periods are characterized by cold water. In the early 1990s, consecutive severe winters contributed towards deep convection in the Labrador Sea. These winters were associated with strong positive fluctuations in the North Atlantic Oscillation. Labrador Sea Water became cold, fresh, and dense during this period, and the layer extended to depths of 2,300 m (7,500 ft) in the spring of 1994. Due to weakened convection, Labrador Sea Water began warming significantly and increased in salinity over the following decade. This trend continued through 2010 and 2011 when weak convection was observed in relation with negative North Atlantic Oscillation. Deep convection was observed again in 2012 with Labrador Sea Water reaching 1400 m, corresponding with a positive North Atlantic Oscillation similar to those seen in the early 1990s.

== See also ==
- Labrador Sea
- North Atlantic Deep Water
- Atlantic Ocean
- North Atlantic Oscillation
