= Anthropogenic tracers =

Human-created chemicals for environmental study

Anthropogenic tracers are chemicals or other substances that are derived from human activities and can be used to study environmental processes. They can be used to date groundwater, track the movement of wastewater, and study the composition of aerosols.

== Examples ==
- CFCs and sulfur hexafluoride dissolve in groundwater and can be used to date it.
- Nitroaromatic hydrocarbons are anthropogenic SOA tracers that can be detected in ambient aerosols.
- Pharmaceuticals such as amitriptyline and N,N-diethyl-m-toluamide can be detected in surface water.
- Methylsuccinic, aromatic, and aliphatic unsaturated acids are anthropogenic tracers that can be detected in fine aerosols.

== Uses ==
- Groundwater dating: The concentration of anthropogenic tracers in groundwater can be used to determine when the water was infiltrated.
- Wastewater tracking: Anthropogenic tracers can be used to track the movement of wastewater in the subsurface.
- Aerosol composition: Anthropogenic tracers can be used to study the composition of aerosols in the atmosphere.
