= Rapid Climate Change-Meridional Overturning Circulation and Heatflux Array =

North Atlantic Ocean research project

The Rapid Climate Change-Meridional Overturning Circulation and Heatflux Array (RAPID or MOCHA) program is a collaborative research project between the National Oceanography Centre (Southampton, U.K.), the University of Miami's Rosenstiel School of Marine, Atmospheric, and Earth Science (RSMAS), and NOAA’s Atlantic Oceanographic and Meteorological Laboratory (AOML) that measures the meridional overturning circulation (MOC) and ocean heat transport in the North Atlantic Ocean. This array was deployed in March 2004 to continuously monitor the MOC and ocean heat transport that are primarily associated with the Thermohaline Circulation across the basin at 26°N. The RAPID-MOCHA array is planned to be continued through 2014 to provide a decade or longer continuous time series.

The continuous observations are measured by an array of instruments along 26°N. This monitoring array directly measures the transport of the Gulf Stream in the Florida Strait using an undersea cable and a moored array measures bottom pressure and water column density (including temperature and salinity) at the western and eastern boundary and on either side of the Mid-Atlantic Ridge (MAR). Absolute transports including barotropic circulation are monitored using precision bottom pressure gauges. "Dynamic height" moorings are used to estimate the spatially average geostropic velocity profile and associated transports over relatively wide mooring separations. The dynamic height moorings require measurements on both sides of the current field only, rather both the horizontal and vertical structure of the current field to be sufficiently well resolved to estimate transports. The basin-wide MOC strength and vertical structure are estimated via Ekman transports by satellite scatterometer measurements and the geostrophic and direct current observations.

RAPID-MOCHA is funded by the National Environmental Research Council (NERC) and the National Science Foundation (NSF).

== MOC Observations ==
Kanzow and colleagues (2007) demonstrated the effective of the array and reported that the sum of the transports into the North Atlantic from March 2004 to March 2005 varies with root-mean-square value of only 3.4 Sv (where 1 Sv = a flow of ocean water of 10^{6} cubic meters per second) as compared to expected measurement errors of 2.7 Sv. In another study also utilizing observations from March 2004 to March 2005, Cunningham et al. (2007) reported a year-long average MOC of 18.7 ± 5.6 Sv with a large variability ranging from 4.4 to 35.3 Sv within the course of a year.

Johns et al. (2009) concluded that the meridional heat transport was highly correlated with changes in the strength of the MOC with the circulation accounting for nearly 90% of the total heat transport and the remainder contained in a quasi-stationary gyre pattern with little net contribution by mesoscale eddies. The average annual mean meridional heat transport from 2004-2007 was reported by Johns et al. (2009) to be 1.33 ± 0.14 petawatts (PW).
