= Positive tipping points =

Thresholds in a complex system

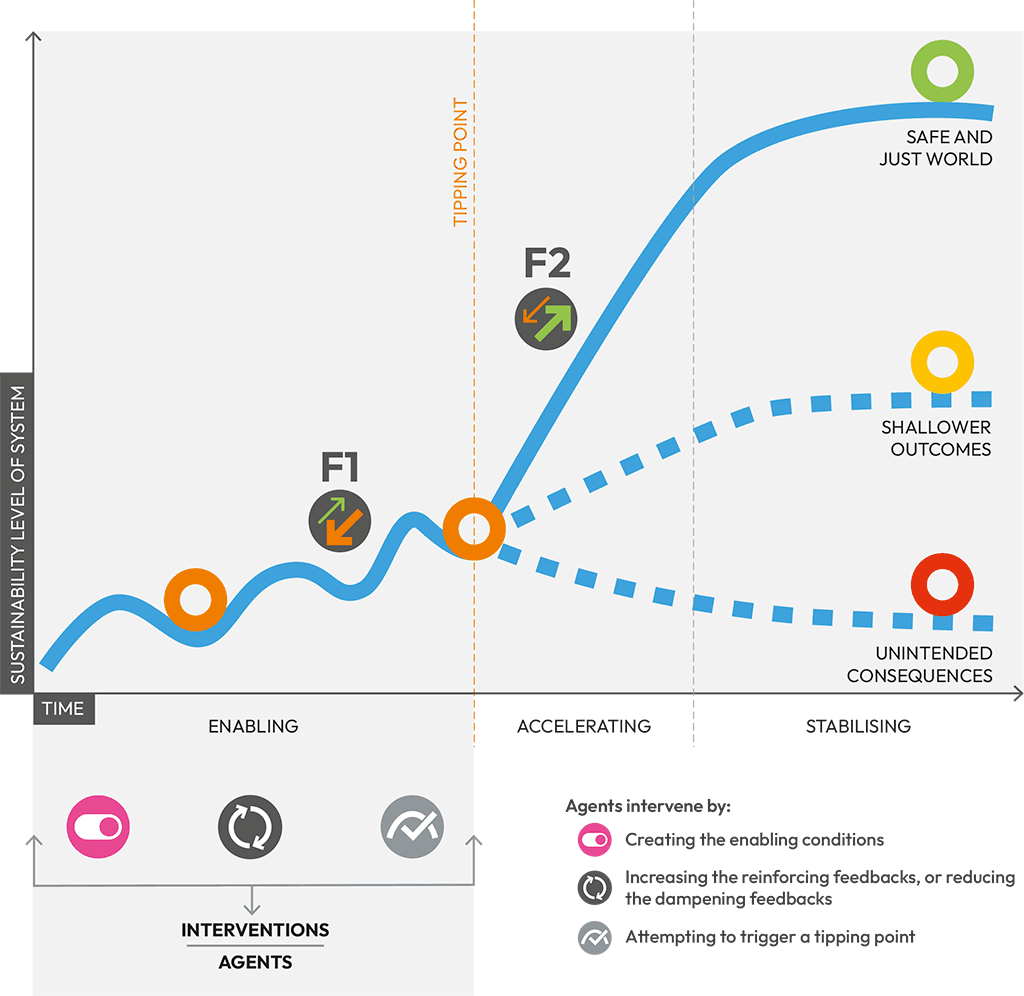
Positive tipping points can shift systems toward more sustainable and equitable outcomes. Change unfolds in three phases: enabling, accelerating, and stabilising. In the enabling phase, change agents can intervene by: (1) creating the right conditions; (2) strengthening reinforcing feedbacks or weakening resistance to change; and (3) actively trying to trigger a tipping point. Once the tipping point is crossed, reinforcing feedbacks take over and change accelerates rapidly. The system eventually settles into a new, more sustainable state, however, shallower or unintended outcomes are also possible.

Positive tipping points are critical thresholds when a small intervention can lead to large-scale, positive changes in a complex system like a society, economy, or the environment. Unlike negative climate tipping points, which can cause harmful shifts, positive tipping points can be deliberately triggered to accelerate change toward more favourable states. For example, they can advance the transition to clean energy use, support environmental protection, or encourage healthier social behaviors. The concept is receiving growing attention in the context of climate action, technological innovation, and societal transformation due to the potential to leverage tipping points to address global challenges.

Positive tipping points happen when specific beneficial changes begin to reinforce themselves. This means that once a change starts, it becomes easier and faster for more change to happen. For example, as solar panels become cheaper more people buy them, which leads to even lower prices and more people using solar energy. Governments and organisations can support the right conditions for positive tipping points to occur.

== Mechanisms ==
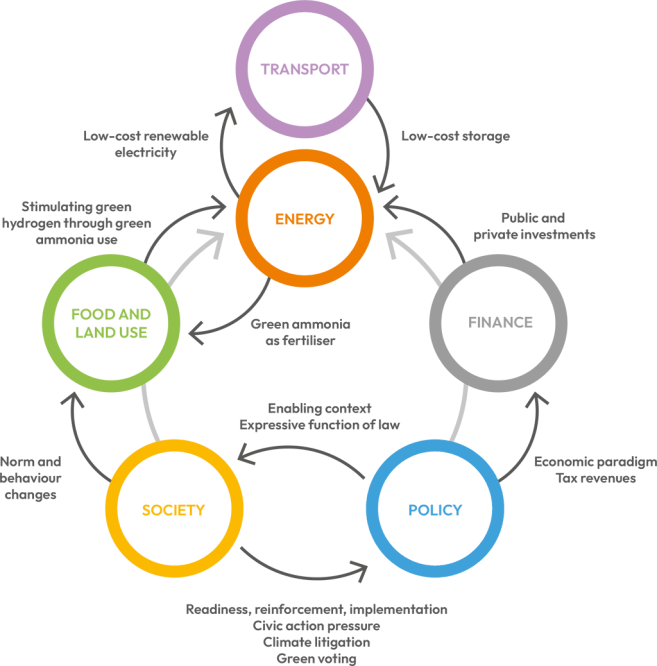
Cross-system interactions can create positive tipping cascades.

Positive tipping points occur when interventions, often small relative to the scale of the system, amplify through reinforcing feedbacks. These feedbacks can include economic incentives, technological learning curves, network effects, or social contagion, that lead to rapid and widespread adoption of new practices or technologies. For example, the rapid decline in the cost of renewable energy technologies has triggered positive tipping points in energy markets, making clean energy more competitive and accelerating its deployment.

One positive tipping point can trigger others, creating a domino effect of positive change known as a tipping cascade. There is also a possibility that positive tipping can result in unintended negative consequences, and that there are 'winners' (groups that benefit) and 'losers' (groups that bear the cost) of positive tipping points. Not all systems have tipping points.

=== Feedbacks ===
Positive tipping points are driven by self-reinforcing ('positive') feedbacks that drive change. To support a positive tipping point, these positive feedbacks should be supported, while the 'negative' feedbacks which maintain the status quo and slow tipping down can be dampened.

For example, positive feedback loops like economies of scale and learning through experience have driven down the cost of solar PV and wind energy to below that of coal. As a result, the majority of new power generation added worldwide in 2022 was from renewable sources. Examples of negative feedbacks include social conformity and habits that make it difficult for people to adapt to more sustainable lifestyles, and economic barriers to change like high costs and supply chain disruptions.

=== Enabling conditions ===
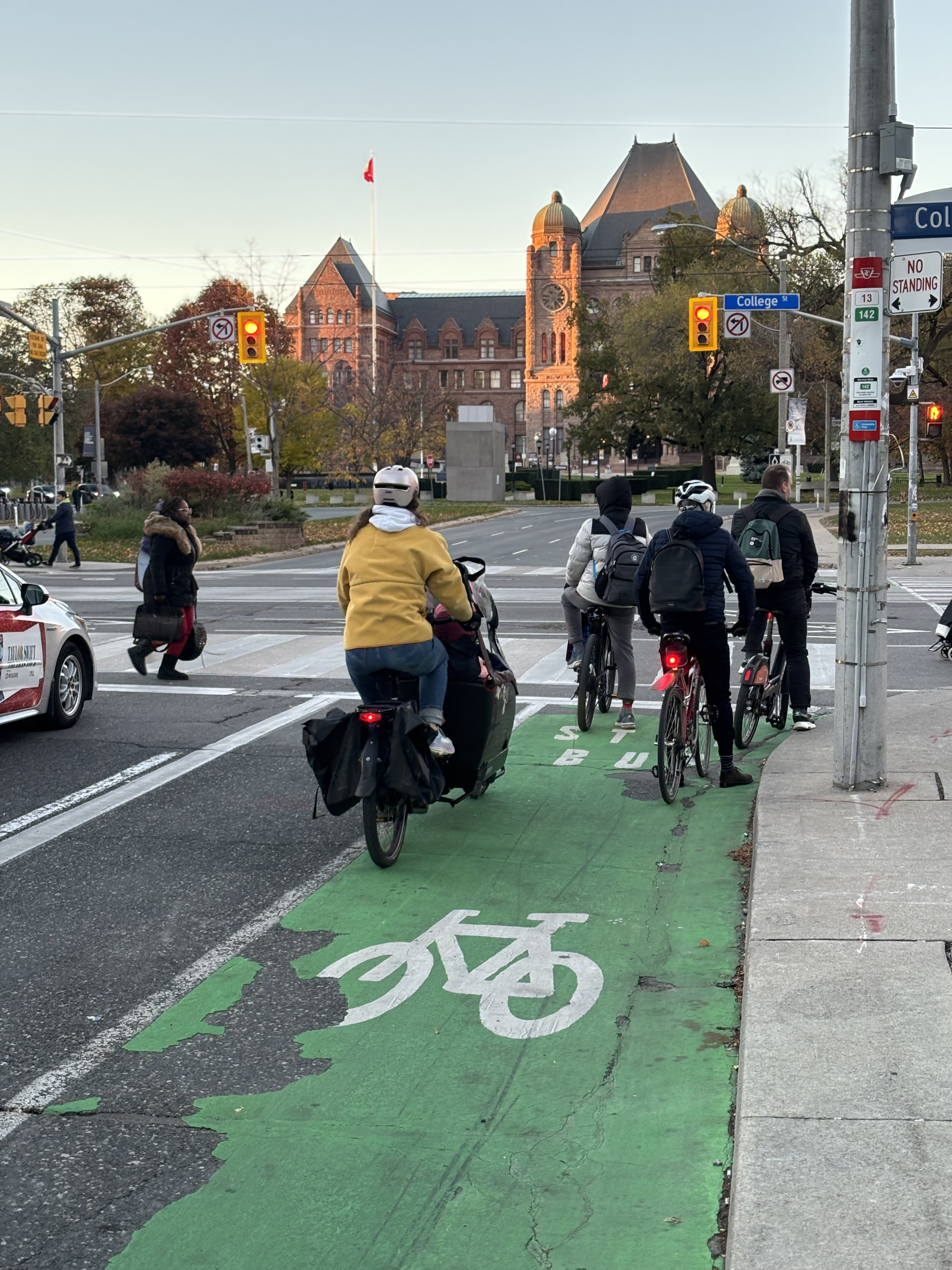
Policy changes supporting investments in bike lanes is an example of an enabling condition for normalising cycling for transport.

Positive tipping points typically require preparation to create favorable conditions before the actual tipping can occur. This preparation involves weakening the negative feedbacks that maintain the current state while simultaneously strengthening reinforcing positive feedbacks that can amplify desired change. Once these enabling conditions are established, even a small additional change or intervention can trigger the self-reinforcing processes that drive the system toward a new, more desirable state. For example, changing social norms like fossil fuel use becoming socially unacceptable, or policy changes supporting investments in bike lanes create enabling conditions for positive tipping points.

In practice, positive tipping points are usually driven by interactions between technology, behaviour, politics, and economics.

=== Strategic interventions to trigger tipping ===
Unlike negative tipping points that are typically to be avoided, positive tipping points can be deliberately sought and triggered for beneficial outcomes. Triggers can be deliberate actions timed strategically such as a social innovation, technological innovation, an investment or a policy intervention, or they can be incidental events, like a natural disaster.

== Applications and examples ==
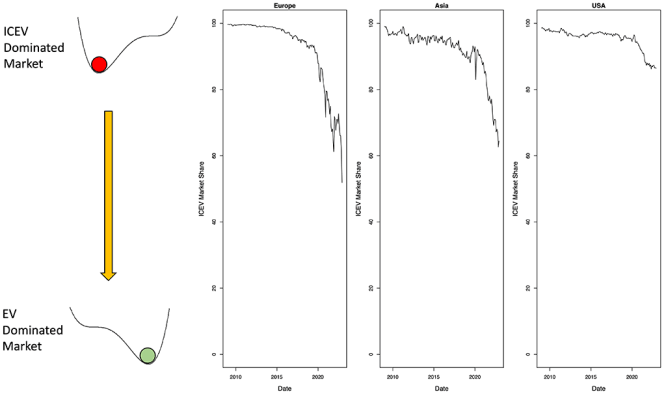
Internal combustion engine vehicle (ICEV) Market Share in Europe, Asia and the USA, alongside a cartoon representing the alternate combustion engine vehicle (ICV) dominated and electric vehicle (EV) dominated regimes which may exist.

The concept of positive tipping points is particularly relevant in climate policy and sustainability transitions. By identifying leverage points, such as strategic investments, regulatory changes, or public campaigns, policymakers and stakeholders can trigger self-sustaining transitions toward low-carbon systems. Positive tipping points are also observed in social systems, where shifts in public opinion or behavior can cascade rapidly once a critical mass is reached.

For example, targeted actions have created economies of scale that are now propelling the rapid uptake of renewable energy worldwide, which has reached or exceeded cost parity with fossil fuel power generation. Electric vehicles appear to have reached a positive tipping point toward mass adoption. This is driven by factors such as lower battery costs and increased government incentives. EVs are poised to rapidly capture over 50% of the market share in Europe and Asia.

The reintroduction of gray wolves to the Yellowstone National Park can be considered an example of triggering a positive ecological tipping point. The wolves' predation on elk, which had been overgrazing the landscape, triggered a trophic cascade, a self-reinforcing process that improved biodiversity and transformed the local ecosystem.
