= Tipping points in the climate system =

Critical thresholds in climate science

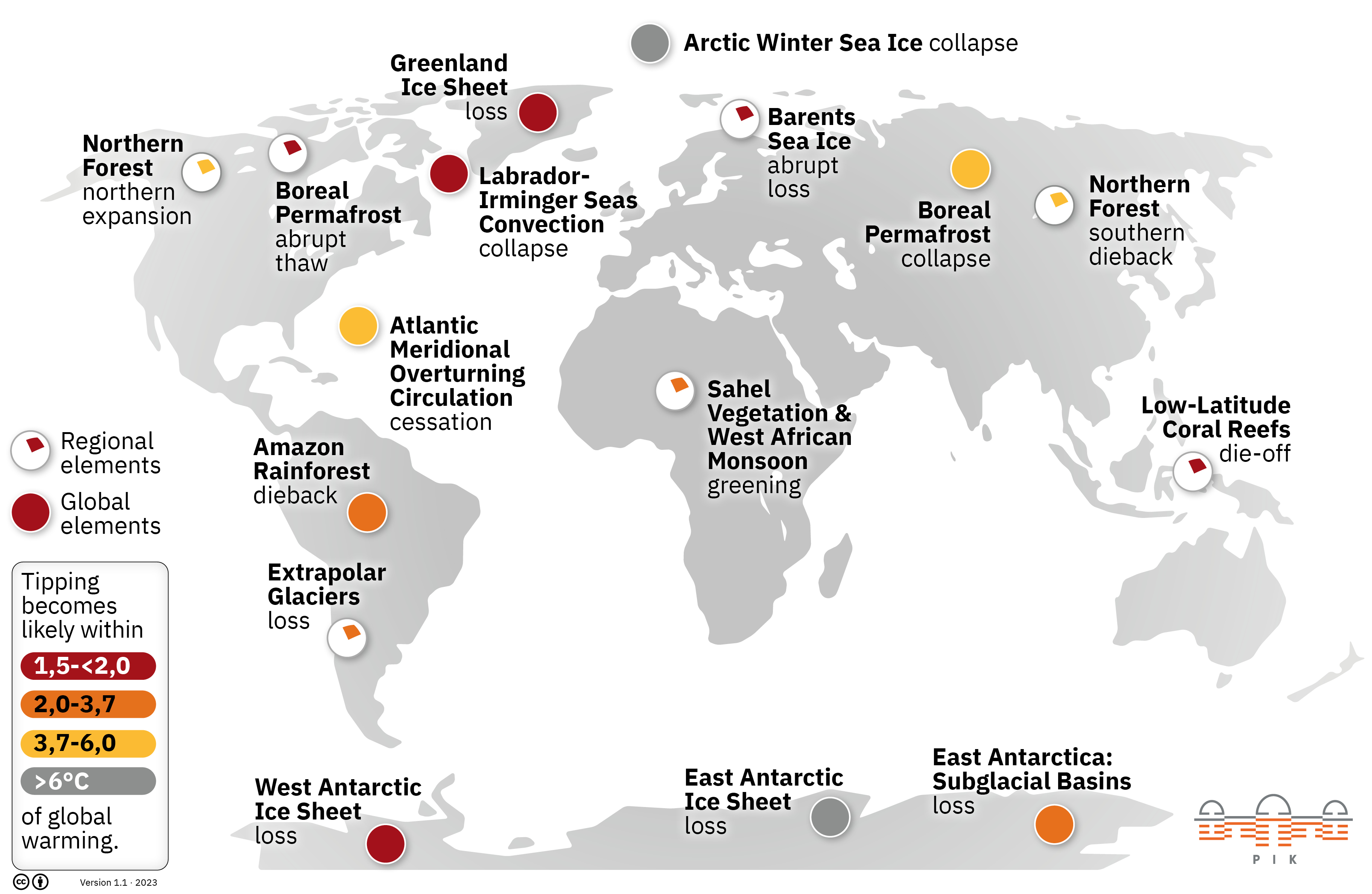
A map showing global and regional tipping elements: if the global temperature increases past a certain point (color-coded for temperature thresholds), this particular element would be tipped. The result would be a transition to a different state.

In climate science, a tipping point is a critical threshold that, when crossed, leads to large, accelerating and often irreversible changes in the climate system. If tipping points are crossed, they are likely to have severe impacts on human society and may accelerate global warming. Tipping behavior is found across the climate system, for example in ice sheets, mountain glaciers, circulation patterns in the ocean, in ecosystems, and the atmosphere. Examples of tipping points include thawing permafrost, which will release methane, a powerful greenhouse gas, or melting ice sheets and glaciers reducing Earth's albedo, which would warm the planet faster. Thawing permafrost is a threat multiplier because it holds roughly twice as much carbon as the amount currently circulating in the atmosphere.

Tipping points are often, but not necessarily, abrupt. For example, with average global warming somewhere between 0.8 °C (1.4 °F) and 3 °C (5.4 °F), the Greenland ice sheet passes a tipping point and melts, but it would take place over millennia. Tipping points are possible at today's global warming of just over 1 °C (1.8 °F) above preindustrial times, and highly probable above 2 °C (3.6 °F) of global warming. It is possible that some tipping points are close to being crossed or have already been crossed, like those of the West Antarctic and Greenland ice sheets, the Amazon rainforest and warm-water coral reefs. A 2022 study published in Science found that exceeding 1.5 °C of global warming could trigger multiple tipping points, including the collapse of major ice sheets, abrupt thawing of permafrost, and coral reef die-off, with potential for cascading system effects.

A danger is that if the tipping point in one system is crossed, this could cause a cascade of other tipping points, leading to severe, potentially catastrophic, impacts. Crossing a threshold in one part of the climate system may trigger another tipping element to tip into a new state. For example, ice loss in West Antarctica and Greenland will significantly alter ocean circulation. Sustained warming of the northern high latitudes as a result of this process could activate tipping elements in that region, such as permafrost degradation, and boreal forest dieback.

Scientists have identified many elements in the climate system which may have tipping points. As of September 2022, nine global core tipping elements and seven regional impact tipping elements are known. Out of those, one regional and three global climate elements will likely pass a tipping point if global warming reaches 1.5 °C (2.7 °F) including the Greenland and West Antarctic ice sheet collapsing, tropical coral reefs die off, and abrupt boreal permafrost will thaw.

Tipping points exist in a range of systems, for example in the cryosphere, within ocean currents, and in terrestrial systems. The tipping points in the cryosphere include: Greenland ice sheet disintegration, West Antarctic ice sheet disintegration, East Antarctic ice sheet disintegration, Arctic sea ice decline, retreat of mountain glaciers, permafrost thaw. The tipping points for ocean current changes include the Atlantic Meridional Overturning Circulation (AMOC), the North Subpolar Gyre and the Southern Ocean overturning circulation. Lastly, the tipping points in terrestrial systems include Amazon rainforest dieback, boreal forest biome shift, Sahel greening, and vulnerable stores of tropical peat carbon.

== Definition ==
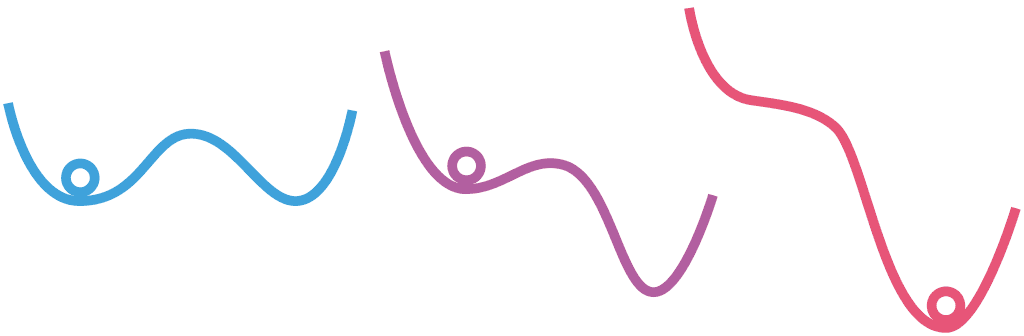
A system going past a tipping point. The system starts (blue) in one of two alternative stable states, represented by the ball in the left hand valley. Under external forcing over time (left to right) this state loses stability (purple), represented by the valley getting shallower, lowering the hilltop. Past a tipping point the initial stable state disappears and the system undergoes an abrupt, self-propelling change into the alternative, remaining stable state (red).

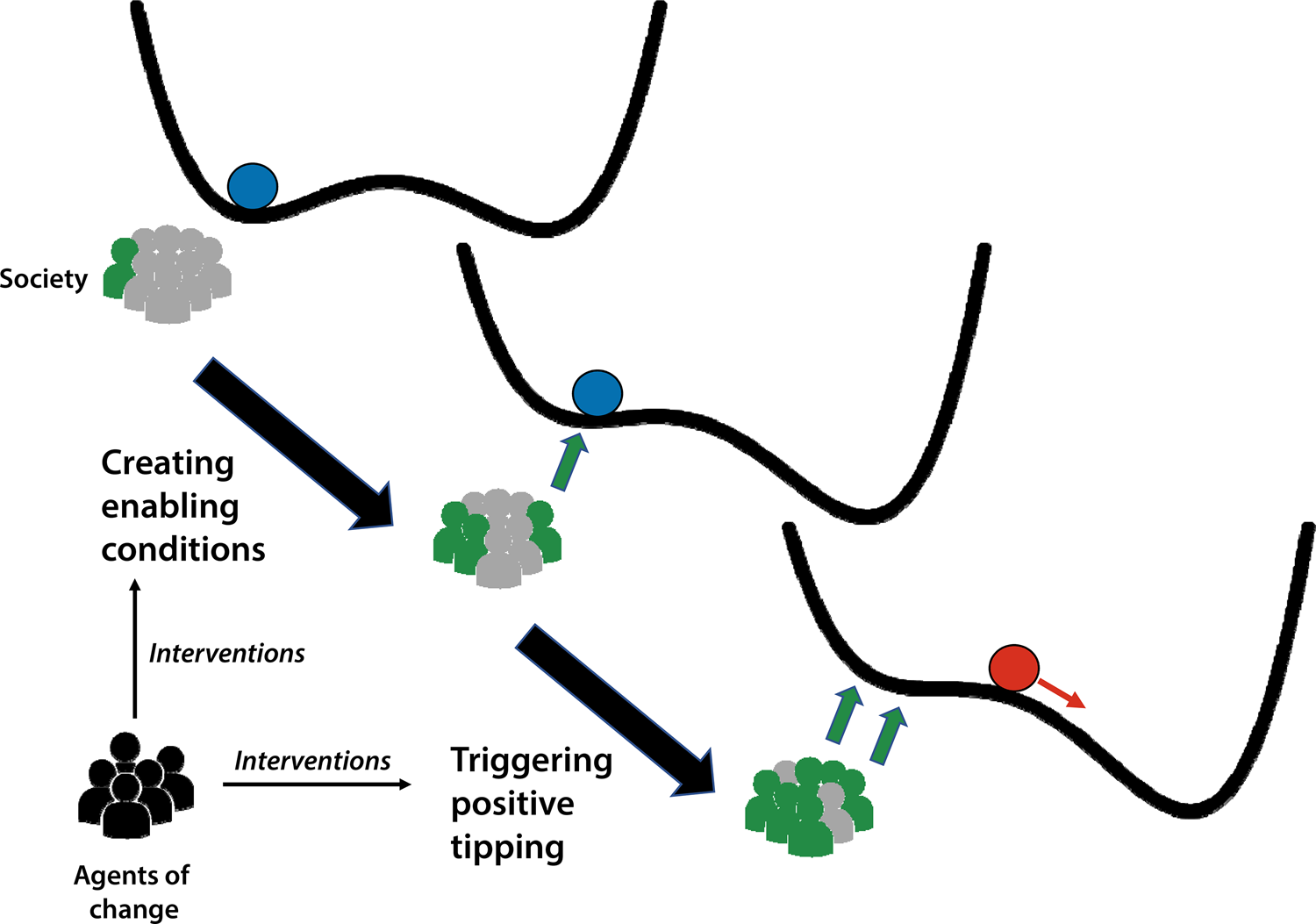
Positive tipping point in society

The IPCC Sixth Assessment Report defines a tipping point as a "critical threshold beyond which a system reorganizes, often abruptly and/or irreversibly". It can be brought about by a small disturbance causing a disproportionately large change in the system. It can also be associated with self-reinforcing feedbacks, which could lead to changes in the climate system irreversible on a human timescale. For any particular climate component, the shift from one state to a new stable state may take many decades or centuries.

The 2019 IPCC Special Report on the Ocean and Cryosphere in a Changing Climate defines a tipping point as: "A level of change in system properties beyond which a system reorganises, often in a non-linear manner, and does not return to the initial state even if the drivers of the change are abated. For the climate system, the term refers to a critical threshold at which global or regional climate changes from one stable state to another stable state."

In ecosystems and in social systems, a tipping point can trigger a regime shift, a major systems reorganisation into a new stable state. Such regime shifts need not be harmful. In the context of the climate crisis, the tipping point metaphor is sometimes used in a positive sense, such as to refer to shifts in public opinion in favor of action to mitigate climate change, or the potential for minor policy changes to rapidly accelerate the transition to a green economy.

== Comparison of tipping points ==
Scientists have identified many elements in the climate system which may have tipping points. In the early 2000s the IPCC began considering the possibility of tipping points, originally referred to as large-scale discontinuities. At that time the IPCC concluded they would only be likely in the event of global warming of 4 °C (7.2 °F) or more above preindustrial times, and another early assessment placed most tipping point thresholds at 3–5 °C (5.4–9.0 °F) above 1980–1999 average warming.

Since then, estimates for global warming thresholds have generally fallen, with some thought to be possible in the Paris Agreement range (1.5–2 °C (2.7–3.6 °F)) by 2016. As of 2021 tipping points are considered to have significant probability at today's warming level of just over 1 °C (1.8 °F), with high probability above 2 °C (3.6 °F) of global warming. Some tipping points may be close to being crossed or have already been crossed, like those of the ice sheets in West Antarctic and Greenland, warm-water coral reefs, and the Amazon rainforest.

As of September 2022, nine global core tipping elements and seven regional impact tipping elements have been identified. Out of those, one regional and three global climate elements are estimated to likely pass a tipping point if global warming reaches 1.5 °C (2.7 °F), namely Greenland ice sheet collapse, West Antarctic ice sheet collapse, tropical coral reef die off, and boreal permafrost abrupt thaw. Two further tipping points are forecast as likely if warming continues to approach 2 °C (3.6 °F): Barents sea ice abrupt loss, and the Labrador Sea subpolar gyre collapse.

Global core tipping elements
| Proposed climate tipping element (and tipping point) | Threshold ( °C) | | | Timescale (years) | | | Maximum Impact ( °C) | |
| Proposed climate tipping element (and tipping point) | Estimated | Minimum | Maximum | Estimated | Minimum | Maximum | Global | Regional |
|---|---|---|---|---|---|---|---|---|
| Greenland Ice Sheet (collapse) | 1.5 | 0.8 | 3.0 | 10,000 | 1,000 | 15,000 | 0.13 | 0.5 to 3.0 |
| West Antarctic Ice Sheet (collapse) | 1.5 | 1.0 | 3.0 | 2,000 | 500 | 13,000 | 0.05 | 1.0 |
| Labrador-Irminger Seas/SPG Convection (collapse) | 1.8 | 1.1 | 3.8 | 10 | 5 | 50 | -0.5 | -3.0 |
| East Antarctic Subglacial Basins (collapse) | 3.0 | 2.0 | 6.0 | 2,000 | 500 | 10,000 | 0.05 | ? |
| Arctic Winter Sea Ice (collapse) | 6.3 | 4.5 | 8.7 | 20 | 10 | 100 | 0.6 | 0.6 to 1.2 |
| East Antarctic Ice Sheet (collapse) | 7.5 | 5.0 | 10.0 | ? | 10,000 | ? | 0.6 | 2.0 |
| Amazon Rainforest (dieback) | 3.5 | 2.0 | 6.0 | 100 | 50 | 200 | 0.1 (partial) 0.2 (total) (Note: The paper also provides the same estimate in terms of equivalent emissions: partial dieback would be equivalent to the emissions of 30 billion tonnes of carbon, while total dieback would be equivalent to 75 billion tonnes of carbon.) | 0.4 to 2.0 |
| Boreal Permafrost (collapse) | 4.0 | 3.0 | 6.0 | 50 | 10 | 300 | 0.2 - 0.4 (Note: The paper also provides the same estimate in terms of emissions: between 125 and 250 billion tonnes of carbon and between 175 and 350 billion tonnes of carbon equivalent.) | ~ |
| Atlantic Meridional Overturning Circulation (collapse) | 4.0 | 1.4 | 8.0 | 50 | 15 | 300 | -0.5 | -4 to -10 |

Regional impact tipping elements
| Proposed climate tipping element (and tipping point) | Threshold ( °C) | | | Timescale (years) | | | Maximum Impact ( °C) | |
| Proposed climate tipping element (and tipping point) | Estimated | Minimum | Maximum | Estimated | Minimum | Maximum | Global | Regional |
|---|---|---|---|---|---|---|---|---|
| Low-latitude Coral Reefs (dieoff) | 1.5 | 1.0 | 2.0 | 10 | ~ | ~ | ~ | ~ |
| Boreal Permafrost (abrupt thaw) | 1.5 | 1.0 | 2.3 | 200 | 100 | 300 | 0.04 per °C by 2100; 0.11 per °C by 2300 (Note: The paper clarifies that this represents a 50% increase of gradual permafrost thaw: it also provides the same estimate in terms of emissions per each degree of warming: 10 billion tonnes of carbon and 14 billion tonnes of carbon equivalent by 2100, and 25/35 billion tonnes of carbon/carbon equivalent by 2300.) | ~ |
| Barents Sea Ice (abrupt loss) | 1.6 | 1.5 | 1.7 | 25 | ? | ? | ~ | + |
| Mountain Glaciers (loss) | 2.0 | 1.5 | 3.0 | 200 | 50 | 1,000 | 0.08 | + |
| Sahel and W.African Monsoon (greening) | 2.8 | 2.0 | 3.5 | 50 | 10 | 500 | ~ | + |
| Boreal Forest (southern dieoff) | 4.0 | 1.4 | 5.0 | 100 | 50 | ? | net -0.18 (Note: The loss of these forests would be equivalent to the emissions of 52 billion tons of carbon, but this would be more than offset by the area's albedo effect increasing and reflecting more sunlight.) | -0.5 to -2 |
| Boreal Forest (northern expansion) | 4.0 | 1.5 | 7.2 | 100 | 40 | ? | net +0.14 (Note: Extra forest growth here would absorb around 6 billion tons of carbon, but because this area receives a lot of sunlight, this is very minor when compared to reduced albedo, as this vegetation absorbs more heat than the snow-covered ground it moves into.) | 0.5-1.0 |

== Tipping points in the cryosphere ==
=== Greenland ice sheet disintegration ===
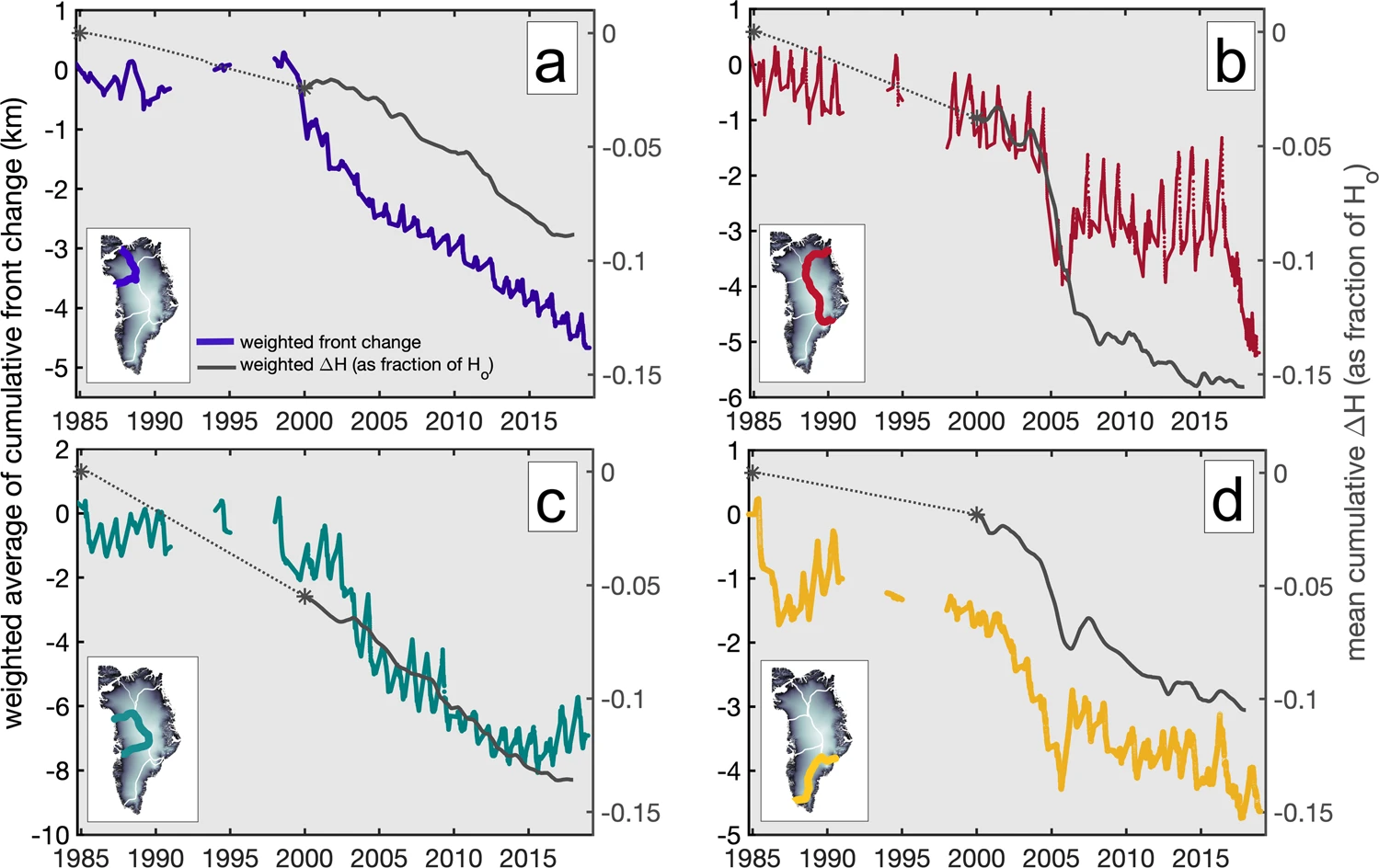
Changes in extent (colored lines) and thickness (black lines) of the Greenland ice sheet over time, showing its rapid, sustained melting since 2000

The Greenland ice sheet is the second largest ice sheet in the world, and completely melting the water which it holds would raise sea levels globally by 7.2 metres (24 ft). Due to global warming, the ice sheet is currently melting at an accelerating rate, adding almost 1 mm to global sea levels every year. Around half of the ice loss occurs via surface melting, and the remainder occurs at the base of the ice sheet where it touches the sea, by calving (breaking off) icebergs from its margins.

The Greenland ice sheet has a tipping point because of the melt-elevation feedback. Surface melting reduces the height of the ice sheet, and air at a lower altitude is warmer. The ice sheet is then exposed to warmer temperatures, accelerating its melt. A 2021 analysis of sub-glacial sediment at the bottom of a 1.4 kilometres (0.87 mi) Greenland ice core finds that the Greenland ice sheet melted away at least once during the last million years, and therefore strongly suggests that its tipping point is below the 2.5 °C (4.5 °F) maximum temperature increase over the preindustrial conditions observed over that period. There is some evidence that the Greenland ice sheet is losing stability, and getting close to a tipping point.

=== West Antarctic ice sheet disintegration ===
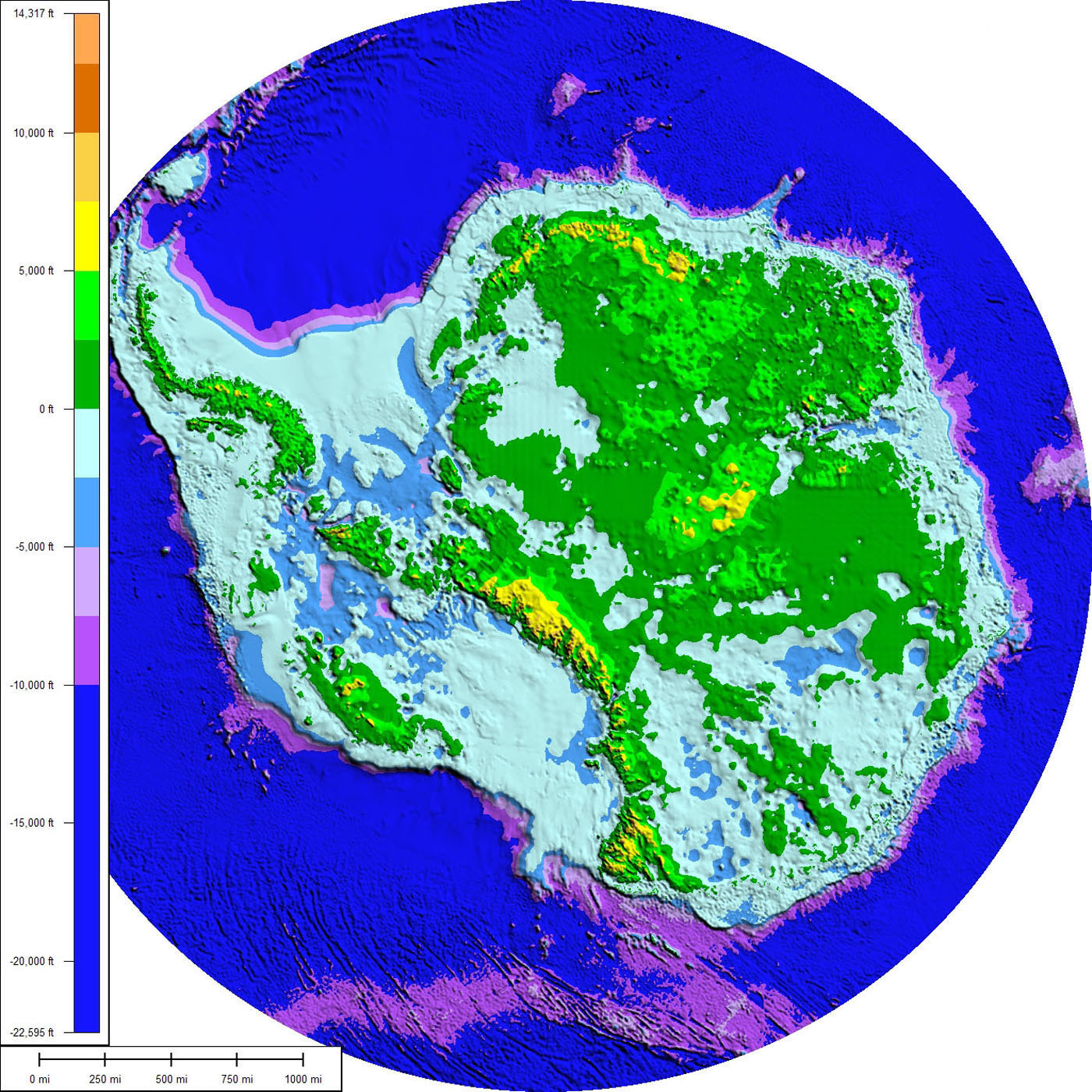
A topographic and bathymetric map of Antarctica without its ice sheets, assuming constant sea levels and no post-glacial rebound

The West Antarctic Ice Sheet (WAIS) is a large ice sheet in Antarctica; in places more than 4 kilometres (2.5 mi) thick. It sits on bedrock mostly below sea level, having formed a deep subglacial basin due to the weight of the ice sheet over millions of years. As such, it is in contact with the heat from the ocean which makes it vulnerable to fast and irreversible ice loss. A tipping point could be reached once the WAIS's grounding lines (the point at which ice no longer sits on rock and becomes floating ice shelves) retreat behind the edge of the subglacial basin, resulting in self-sustaining retreat in to the deeper basin - a process known as the Marine Ice Sheet Instability (MISI). Thinning and collapse of the WAIS's ice shelves is helping to accelerate this grounding line retreat. If completely melted, the WAIS would contribute around 3.3 metres (11 ft) of sea level rise over thousands of years.

Ice loss from the WAIS is accelerating, and some outlet glaciers are estimated to be close to or possibly already beyond the point of self-sustaining retreat. The paleo record suggests that during the past few hundred thousand years, the WAIS largely disappeared in response to similar levels of warming and CO_{2} emission scenarios projected for the next few centuries.

Like with the other ice sheets, there is a counteracting negative feedback - greater warming also intensifies the effects of climate change on the water cycle, which result in an increased precipitation over the ice sheet in the form of snow during the winter, which would freeze on the surface, and this increase in the surface mass balance (SMB) counteracts some fraction of the ice loss. In the IPCC Fifth Assessment Report, it was suggested that this effect could potentially overpower increased ice loss under the higher levels of warming and result in small net ice gain, but by the time of the IPCC Sixth Assessment Report, improved modelling had proven that the glacier breakup would consistently accelerate at a faster rate.

=== East Antarctic ice sheet disintegration ===
The East Antarctic ice sheet is the largest and thickest ice sheet on Earth, with the maximum thickness of 4,800 metres (3.0 mi). A complete disintegration would raise the global sea levels by 53.3 metres (175 ft), but this may not occur until global warming of 10 °C (18 °F), while the loss of two-thirds of its volume may require at least 6 °C (11 °F) of warming to trigger. Its melt would also occur over a longer timescale than the loss of any other ice on the planet, taking no less than 10,000 years to finish. However, the subglacial basin portions of the East Antarctic ice sheet may be vulnerable to tipping at lower levels of warming. The Wilkes Basin is of particular concern, as it holds enough ice to raise sea levels by about 3–4 metres (10–13 ft).

=== Arctic sea ice decline ===
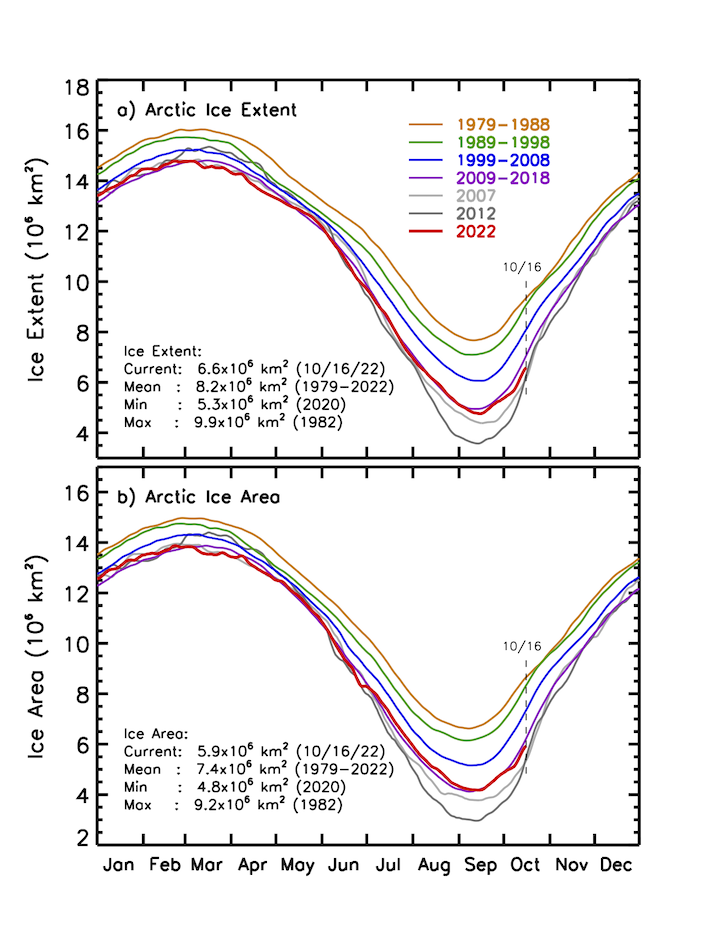
The average decadal extent and area of the Arctic Ocean sea ice since the start of satellite observations

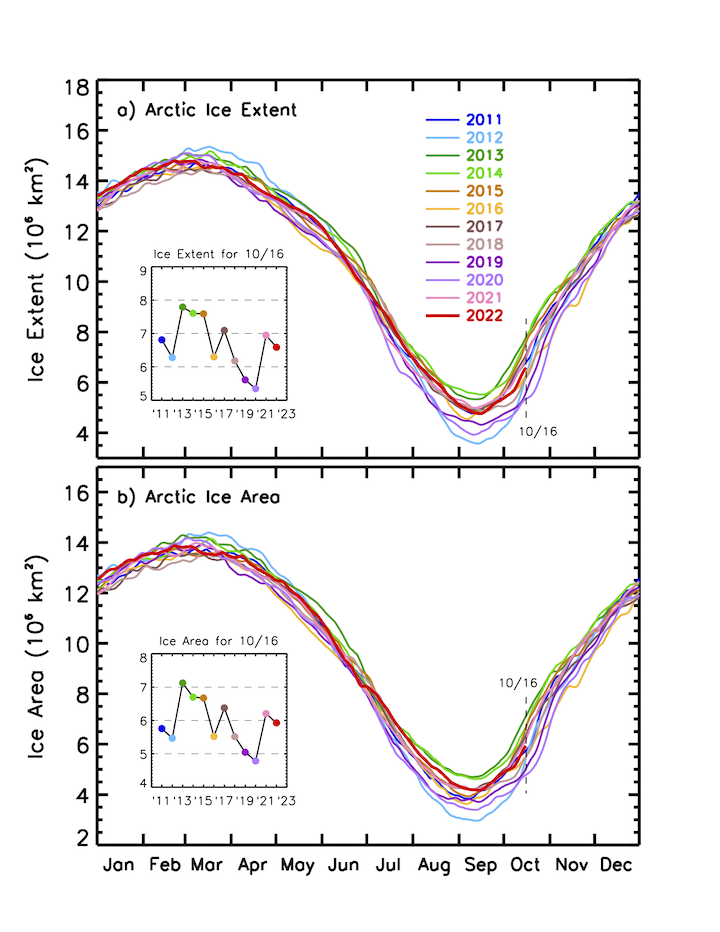
The annual trend in the Arctic sea ice extent and area, 2011–2022

Arctic sea ice was once identified as a potential tipping element. The loss of sunlight-reflecting sea ice during summer exposes the (dark) ocean, which would warm. Arctic sea ice cover is likely to melt entirely under even relatively low levels of warming, and it was hypothesised that this could eventually transfer enough heat to the ocean to prevent sea ice recovery even if the global warming is reversed. Modelling now shows that this heat transfer during the Arctic summer does not overcome the cooling and the formation of new ice during the Arctic winter. As such, the loss of Arctic ice during the summer is not a tipping point for as long as the Arctic winter remains cool enough to enable the formation of new Arctic sea ice. However, if the higher levels of warming prevent the formation of new Arctic ice even during winter, then this change may become irreversible. Consequently, Arctic Winter Sea Ice is included as a potential tipping point in a 2022 assessment.

Additionally, the same assessment argued that while the rest of the ice in the Arctic Ocean may recover from a total summertime loss during the winter, ice cover in the Barents Sea may not reform during the winter even below 2 °C (3.6 °F) of warming. This is because the Barents Sea is already the fastest-warming part of the Arctic: in 2021–2022 it was found that while the warming within the Arctic Circle has already been nearly four times faster than the global average since 1979, Barents Sea warmed up to seven times faster than the global average. This tipping point matters because of the decade-long history of research into the connections between the state of Barents-Kara Sea ice and the weather patterns elsewhere in Eurasia.

=== Retreat of mountain glaciers ===
Projected loss of mountain glaciers over the 21st century, for different amounts of global warming

Mountain glaciers are the largest repository of land-bound ice after the Greenland and the Antarctica ice sheets, and they are also undergoing melting as the result of climate change. A glacier tipping point is when it enters a disequilibrium state with the climate and will melt away unless the temperatures go down. Examples include glaciers of the North Cascade Range, where even in 2005 67% of the glaciers observed were in disequilibrium and will not survive the continuation of the present climate, or the French Alps, where The Argentière and Mer de Glace glaciers are expected to disappear completely by end of the 21st century if current climate trends persist.

Altogether, it was estimated in 2023 that 49% of the world's glaciers would be lost by 2100 at 1.5 °C (2.7 °F) of global warming, and 83% of glaciers would be lost at 4 °C (7.2 °F). This would amount to one quarter and nearly half of mountain glacier *mass* loss, respectively, as only the largest, most resilient glaciers would survive the century. This ice loss would also contribute ~9 cm (3 1/2 in) and ~15 cm (6 in) to sea level rise, while the current likely trajectory of 2.7 °C (4.9 °F) would result in the SLR contribution of ~11 cm (4 1/2 in) by 2100.

The absolute largest amount of glacier ice is located in the Hindu Kush Himalaya region, which is colloquially known as the Earth's Third Pole as the result. It is believed that one third of that ice will be lost by 2100 even if the warming is limited to 1.5 °C (2.7 °F), while the intermediate and severe climate change scenarios (Representative Concentration Pathways (RCP) 4.5 and 8.5) are likely to lead to the losses of 50% and >67% of the region's glaciers over the same timeframe. Glacier melt is projected to accelerate regional river flows until the amount of meltwater peaks around 2060, going into an irreversible decline afterwards. Since regional precipitation will continue to increase even as the glacier meltwater contribution declines, annual river flows are only expected to diminish in the western basins where contribution from the monsoon is low: however, irrigation and hydropower generation would still have to adjust to greater interannual variability and lower pre-monsoon flows in all of the region's rivers.

=== Permafrost thaw ===
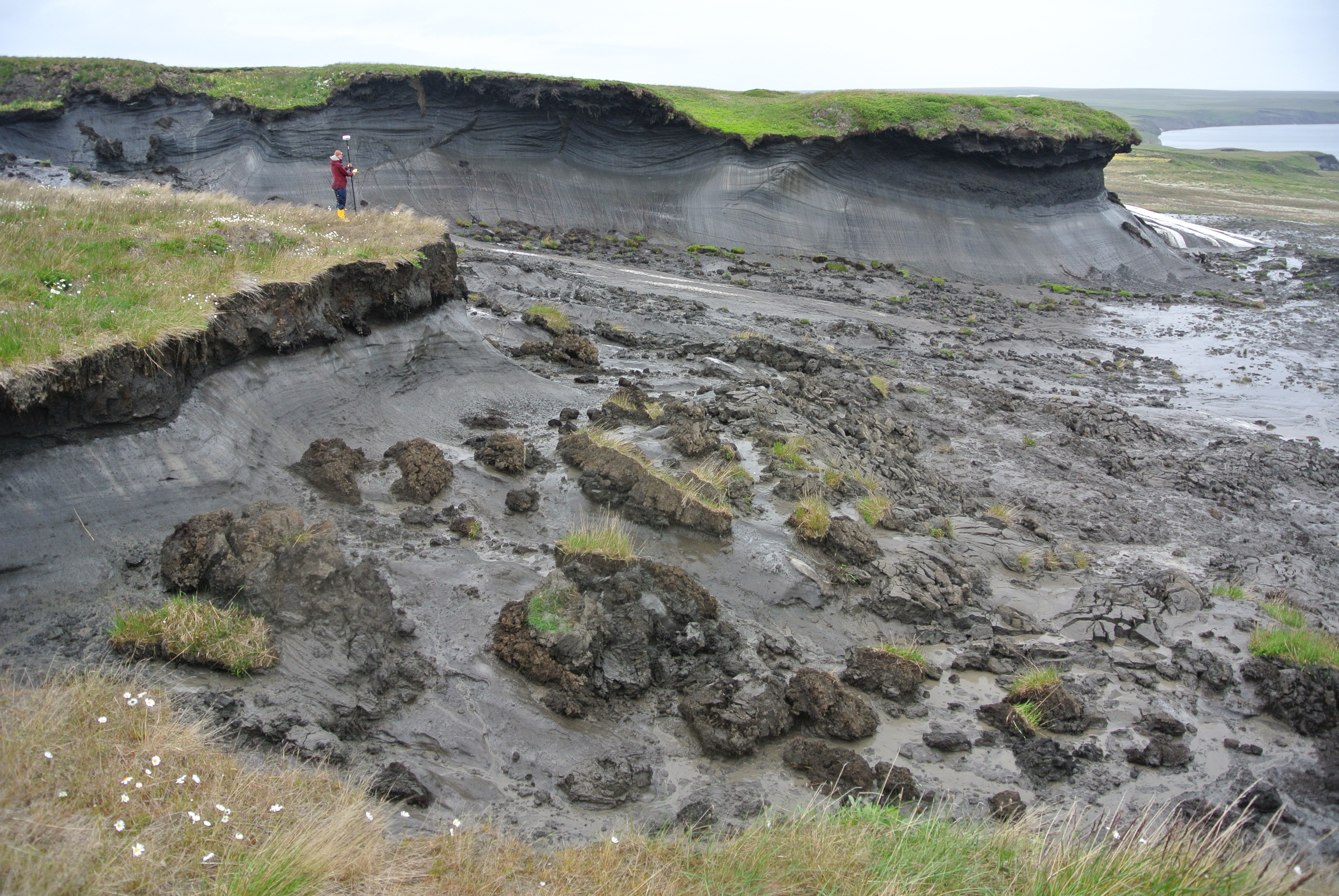
Ground collapse caused by abrupt permafrost thaw in Herschel Island, Canada, 2013

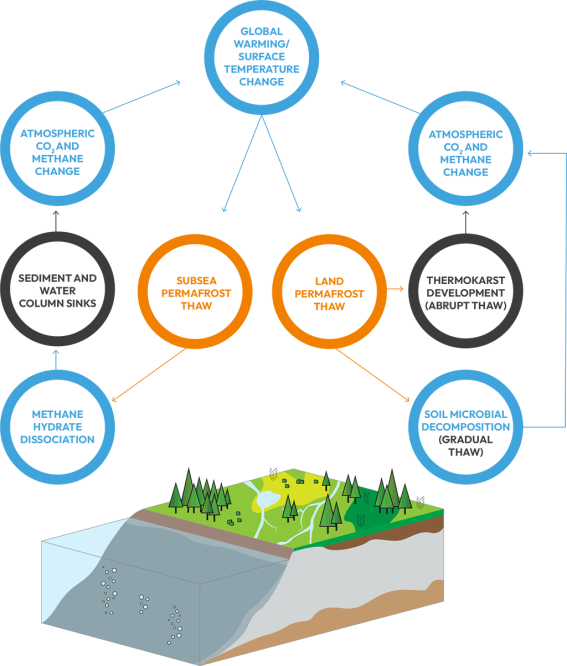
Feedback processes related to land and subsea permafrost

Perennially frozen ground, or permafrost, covers large fractions of land – mainly in Siberia, Alaska, northern Canada and the Tibetan plateau – and can be up to a kilometre thick. Subsea permafrost up to 100 metres thick also occurs on the sea floor under part of the Arctic Ocean. This frozen ground holds vast amounts of carbon from plants and animals that have died and decomposed over thousands of years. Scientists believe there is nearly twice as much carbon in permafrost than is present in Earth's atmosphere.

As the climate warms and the permafrost begins to thaw, carbon dioxide and methane are released into the atmosphere. With higher temperatures, microbes become active and decompose the biological material in the permafrost, some of which is irreversibly lost. While most thaw is gradual and will take centuries, abrupt thaw can occur in some places where permafrost is rich in large ice masses, which once melted cause the ground to slump or form 'thermokarst' lakes over years to decades.

These processes can become self-sustaining, leading to localised tipping dynamics, and could increase greenhouse gas emissions by around 40%. Because CO_{2} and methane are both greenhouse gases, they act as a self-reinforcing feedback on permafrost thaw, but are unlikely to lead to a global tipping point or runaway warming process.

== Tipping points related to ocean current collapse ==
=== Atlantic meridional overturning circulation (AMOC) ===
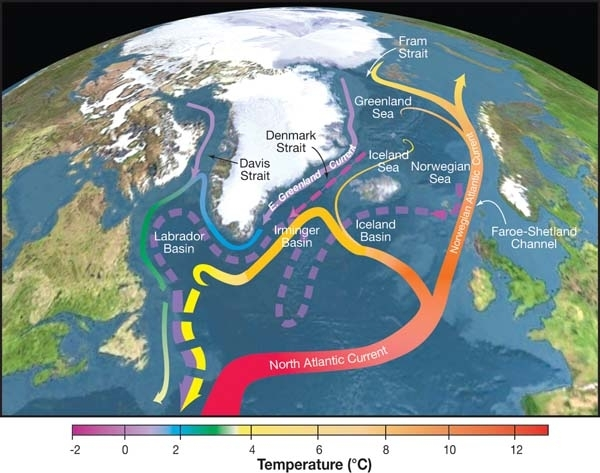
The Northern part of the Atlantic meridional overturning circulation

The Atlantic meridional overturning circulation (AMOC), also known as the Gulf Stream System, is a large system of ocean currents. It is driven by differences in the density of water; colder and more salty water is heavier than warmer fresh water. The AMOC acts as a conveyor belt, sending warm surface water from the tropics north, and carrying cold fresh water back south. As warm water flows northwards, some evaporates which increases salinity. It also cools when it is exposed to cooler air. Cold, salty water is more dense and slowly begins to sink. Several kilometres below the surface, cold, dense water begins to move south. Increased rainfall and the melting of ice due to global warming dilutes the salty surface water, and warming further decreases its density. The lighter water is less able to sink, slowing down the circulation.

Theory, simplified models, and reconstructions of abrupt changes in the past suggest the AMOC has a tipping point. If freshwater input from melting glaciers reaches a certain threshold, it could collapse into a state of reduced flow. Even after melting stops, the AMOC may not return to its current state. It is unlikely that the AMOC will tip in the 21st century, but it may do so before 2300 if greenhouse gas emissions are very high. A weakening of 24% to 39% is expected depending on greenhouse emissions, even without tipping behaviour. If the AMOC does shut down, a new stable state could emerge that lasts for thousands of years, possibly triggering other tipping points.

In 2021, a study which used a primitive finite-difference ocean model estimated that AMOC collapse could be invoked by a sufficiently fast increase in ice melt even if it never reached the common thresholds for tipping obtained from slower change. Thus, it implied that the AMOC collapse is more likely than what is usually estimated by the complex and large-scale climate models. Another 2021 study found early-warning signals in a set of AMOC indices, suggesting that the AMOC may be close to tipping. However, it was contradicted by another study published in the same journal the following year, which found a largely stable AMOC which had so far not been affected by climate change beyond its own natural variability. Two more studies published in 2022 have also suggested that the modelling approaches commonly used to evaluate AMOC appear to overestimate the risk of its collapse. In October 2024, 44 climate scientists published an open letter, claiming that according to scientific studies in the past few years, the risk of AMOC collapse has been greatly underestimated, it can occur in the next few decades, with devastating impacts especially for Nordic countries. An August 2025 study concluded that the collapse of AMOC could start as early as the 2060s.

==== North subpolar gyre ====
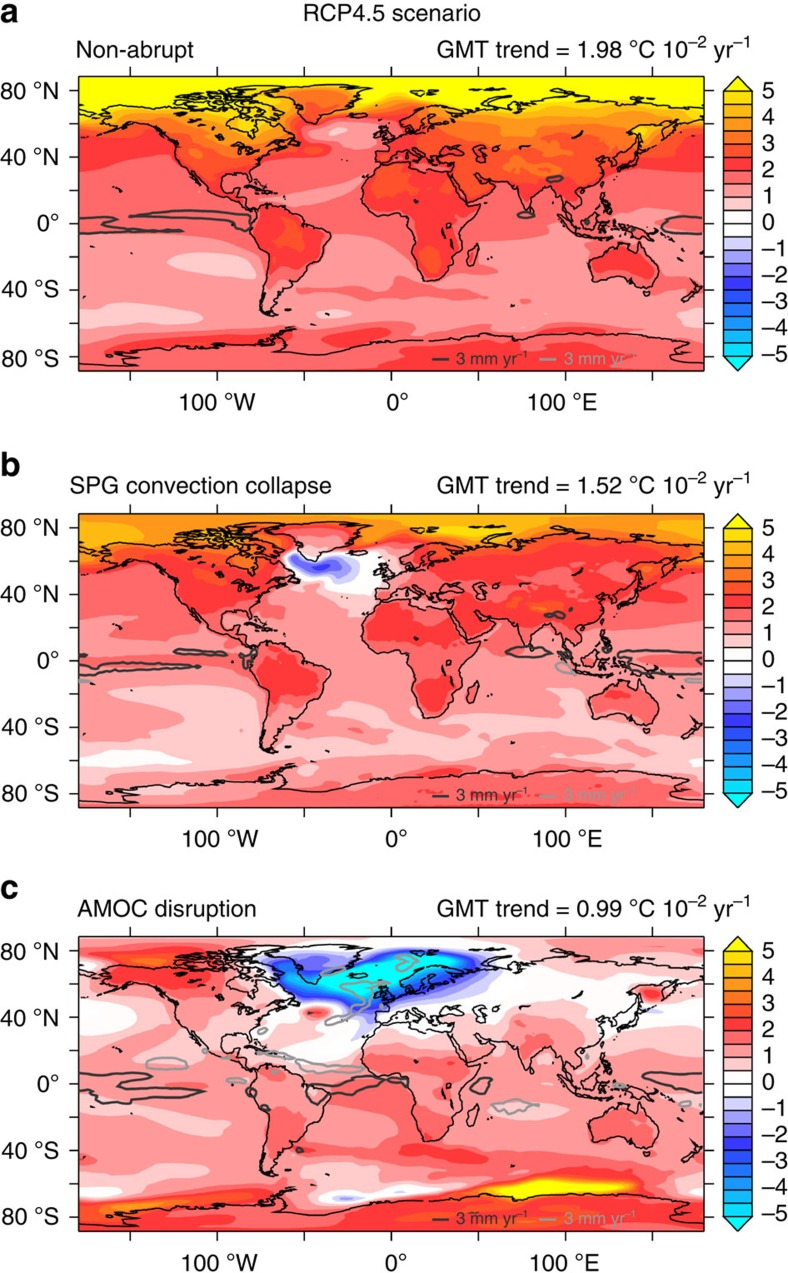
Modelled 21st century warming under the "intermediate" climate change scenario (top). The potential collapse of the subpolar gyre in this scenario (middle). The collapse of the entire AMOC (bottom).

Some climate models indicate that the deep convection in Labrador-Irminger Seas could collapse under certain global warming scenarios, which would then collapse the entire circulation in the North subpolar gyre. It is considered unlikely to recover even if the temperature is returned to a lower level, making it an example of a climate tipping point. This would result in rapid cooling, with implications for economic sectors, agriculture industry, water resources and energy management in Western Europe and the East Coast of the United States. Frajka-Williams et al. 2017 pointed out that recent changes in cooling of the subpolar gyre, warm temperatures in the subtropics and cool anomalies over the tropics, increased the spatial distribution of meridional gradient in sea surface temperatures, which is not captured by the AMO Index.

A 2021 study found that this collapse occurs in only four CMIP6 models out of 35 analyzed. However, only 11 models out of 35 can simulate North Atlantic Current with a high degree of accuracy, and this includes all four models which simulate collapse of the subpolar gyre. As the result, the study estimated the risk of an abrupt cooling event over Europe caused by the collapse of the current at 36.4%, which is lower than the 45.5% chance estimated by the previous generation of models. In 2022, a paper suggested that previous disruption of subpolar gyre was connected to the Little Ice Age.

=== Southern Ocean overturning circulation ===
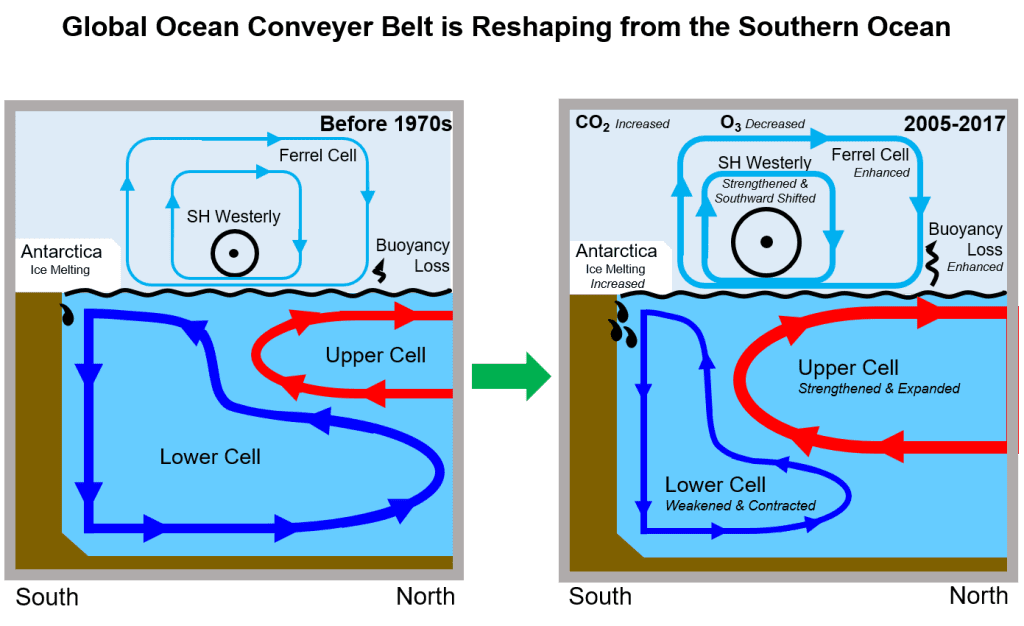
Since the 1970s, the upper cell of the circulation has strengthened, while the lower cell weakened.

Southern ocean overturning circulation itself consists of two parts, the upper and the lower cell. The smaller upper cell is most strongly affected by winds due to its proximity to the surface, while the behaviour of the larger lower cell is defined by the temperature and salinity of Antarctic bottom water. The strength of both halves had undergone substantial changes in the recent decades: the flow of the upper cell has increased by 50–60% since 1970s, while the lower cell has weakened by 10–20%. This has been partly due to the natural cycle of Interdecadal Pacific Oscillation, and climate change has played a substantial role in both trends, as it had altered the Southern Annular Mode weather pattern, while the massive growth of ocean heat content in the Southern Ocean has increased the melting of the Antarctic ice sheets, and this fresh meltwater dilutes salty Antarctic bottom water.

Paleoclimate evidence shows that the entire circulation had strongly weakened or outright collapsed before: some preliminary research suggests that such a collapse may become likely once global warming reaches levels between 1.7 °C (3.1 °F) and 3 °C (5.4 °F). However, there is far less certainty than with the estimates for most other tipping points in the climate system. Even if the circulation's collapse starts in the near future, it is unlikely to be complete until close to 2300, Similarly, impacts such as the reduction in precipitation in the Southern Hemisphere, with a corresponding increase in the North, or a decline of fisheries in the Southern Ocean with a potential collapse of certain marine ecosystems, are also expected to unfold over multiple centuries.

== Tipping points in terrestrial systems ==
As of 2022, 20% of the Amazon rainforest has been "transformed" (deforested) and another 6% has been "highly degraded", causing Amazon Watch to warn that the Amazonia is in the midst of a tipping point crisis.

=== Amazon rainforest dieback ===
The Amazon rainforest is the largest tropical rainforest in the world. It is twice as big as India and spans nine countries in South America. It produces around half of its own rainfall by recycling moisture through evaporation and transpiration as air moves across the forest. This moisture recycling expands the area in which there is enough rainfall for rainforest to be maintained, and without it one model indicates around 40% of the current forest area would be too dry to sustain rainforest. However, when forest is lost via climate change (from droughts and wildfires) or deforestation, there will be less rain in downwind regions, increasing tree stress and mortality there. Eventually, if enough forest is lost a threshold can be reached beyond which large parts of the remaining rainforest may die off and transform into drier degraded forest or savanna landscapes, particularly in the drier south and east. In 2022, a study reported that the rainforest has been losing resilience since the early 2000s. Resilience is measured by recovery-time from short-term perturbations, with delayed return to equilibrium of the rainforest termed as critical slowing down. The observed loss of resilience reinforces the theory that the rainforest could be approaching a critical transition, although it cannot determine exactly when or if a tipping point will be reached.

Large-scale Amazon transitions would only happen at 3.7–4.0°C of warming without deforestation, according to modeling research by Wunderling et al. published in Nature. However, a near system-wide transition across 62–77% of the forest could be triggered by combining warming of 1.5–1.9°C with 22–28% deforestation. The system is getting close to this crucial point, with 17–18% of the Amazon already cleared for development.

=== Boreal forest biome shift ===
During the last quarter of the twentieth century, the zone of latitude occupied by taiga experienced some of the greatest temperature increases on Earth. Winter temperatures have increased more than summer temperatures. In summer, the daily low temperature has increased more than the daily high temperature. It has been hypothesised that the boreal environments have only a few states which are stable in the long term - a treeless tundra/steppe, a forest with >75% tree cover and an open woodland with ≈20% and ≈45% tree cover. Thus, continued climate change would be able to force at least some of the presently existing taiga forests into one of the two woodland states or even into a treeless steppe - but it could also shift tundra areas into woodland or forest states as they warm and become more suitable for tree growth.

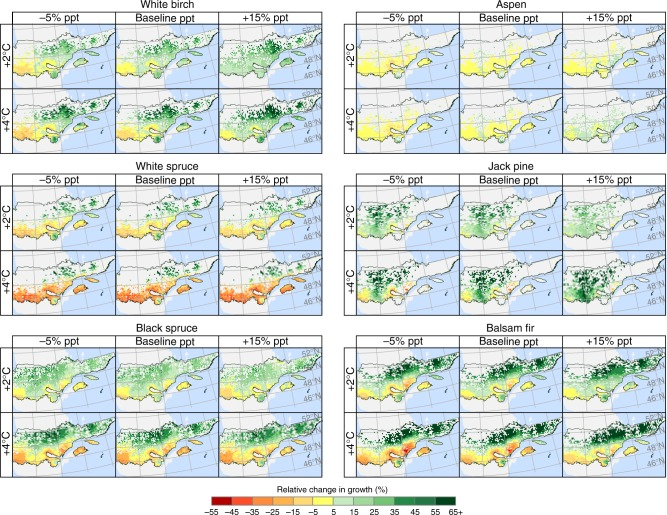
The response of six tree species common in Quebec's forests to 2 °C (3.6 °F) and 4 °C (7.2 °F) warming under different precipitation levels

These trends were first detected in the Canadian boreal forests in the early 2010s, and summer warming had also been shown to increase water stress and reduce tree growth in dry areas of the southern boreal forest in central Alaska and portions of far eastern Russia. In Siberia, the taiga is converting from predominantly needle-shedding larch trees to evergreen conifers in response to a warming climate.

Subsequent research in Canada found that even in the forests where biomass trends did not change, there was a substantial shift towards the deciduous broad-leaved trees with higher drought tolerance over the past 65 years. A Landsat analysis of 100,000 undisturbed sites found that the areas with low tree cover became greener in response to warming, but tree mortality (browning) became the dominant response as the proportion of existing tree cover increased. A 2018 study of the seven tree species dominant in the Eastern Canadian forests found that while 2 °C (3.6 °F) warming alone increases their growth by around 13% on average, water availability is much more important than temperature. Also, further warming of up to 4 °C (7.2 °F) would result in substantial declines unless matched by increases in precipitation.

A 2021 paper had confirmed that the boreal forests are much more strongly affected by climate change than the other forest types in Canada and projected that most of the eastern Canadian boreal forests would reach a tipping point around 2080 under the RCP 8.5 scenario, which represents the largest potential increase in anthropogenic emissions. Another 2021 study projected that under the moderate SSP2-4.5 scenario, boreal forests would experience a 15% worldwide increase in biomass by the end of the century, but this would be more than offset by the 41% biomass decline in the tropics. In 2022, the results of a 5-year warming experiment in North America had shown that the juveniles of tree species which currently dominate the southern margins of the boreal forests fare the worst in response to even 1.5 °C (2.7 °F) or 3.1 °C (5.6 °F) of warming and the associated reductions in precipitation. While the temperate species which would benefit from such conditions are also present in the southern boreal forests, they are both rare and have slower growth rates.

=== Sahel greening ===
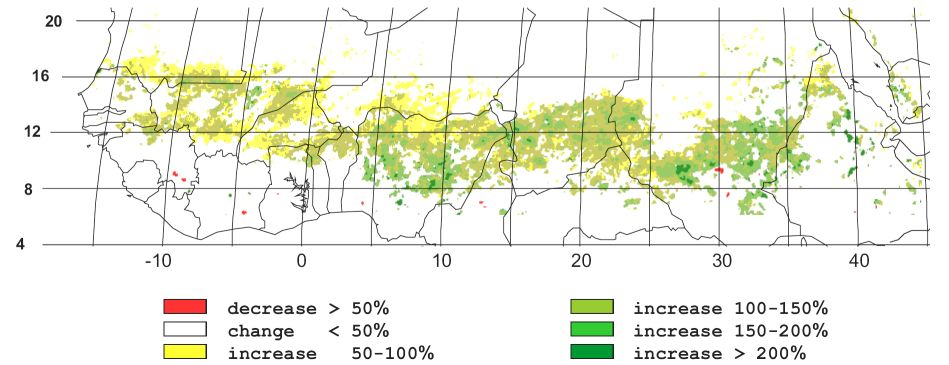
Greening of the Sahel between 1982 and 1999

The Special Report on Global Warming of 1.5 °C and the IPCC Fifth Assessment Report indicate that global warming will likely result in increased precipitation across most of East Africa, parts of Central Africa and the principal wet season of West Africa. However, there is significant uncertainty related to these projections especially for West Africa.Currently, the Sahel is becoming greener but precipitation has not fully recovered to levels reached in the mid-20th century.

A study from 2022 concluded: "Clearly the existence of a future tipping threshold for the WAM (West African Monsoon) and Sahel remains uncertain as does its sign but given multiple past abrupt shifts, known weaknesses in current models, and huge regional impacts but modest global climate feedback, we retain the Sahel/WAM as a potential regional impact tipping element (low confidence)."

Some simulations of global warming and increased carbon dioxide concentrations have shown a substantial increase in precipitation in the Sahel/Sahara. This and the increased plant growth directly induced by carbon dioxide could lead to an expansion of vegetation into present-day desert, although it might be accompanied by a northward shift of the desert, i.e. a drying of northernmost Africa.

=== Vulnerable stores of tropical peat carbon: Cuvette Centrale peatland ===
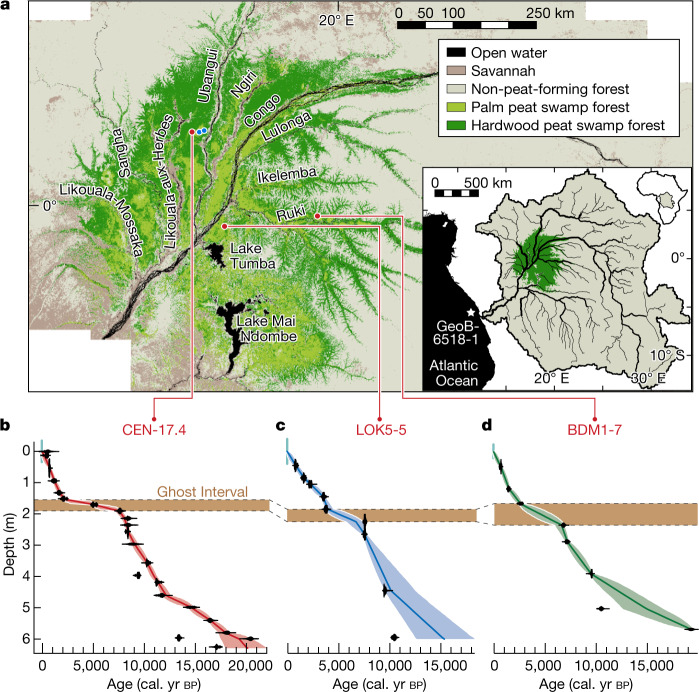
Map of Cuvette Centrale location in the Congo Basin. Three graphs portray the evolution of its peatland carbon content over the past 20,000 years, as reconstructed from three peat cores.

In 2017, it was discovered that 40% of the Cuvette Centrale wetlands are underlain with a dense layer of peat, which contains around 30 petagrams (billions of tons) of carbon. This amounts to 28% of all tropical peat carbon, equivalent to the carbon contained in all the forests of the Congo Basin. In other words, while this peatland only covers 4% of the Congo Basin area, its carbon content is equal to that of all trees in the other 96%. It was then estimated that if all of that peat burned, the atmosphere would absorb the equivalent of 20 years of current United States carbon dioxide emissions, or three years of all anthropogenic CO_{2} emissions.

This threat prompted the signing of Brazzaville Declaration in March 2018: an agreement between Democratic Republic of Congo, the Republic of Congo and Indonesia (a country with longer experience of managing its own tropical peatlands) aiming to promote better management and conservation of this region. However, 2022 research by the same team which had originally discovered this peatland not only revised its area (from the original estimate of 145,500 square kilometres (56,200 sq mi) to 167,600 square kilometres (64,700 sq mi)) and depth (from 2 m (6.6 ft) to (1.7 m (5.6 ft)) but also noted that only 8% of this peat carbon is currently covered by the existing protected areas. For comparison, 26% of its peat is located in areas open to logging, mining or palm oil plantations, and nearly all of this area is open for fossil fuel exploration.

Even in the absence of local disturbance from these activities, this area is the most vulnerable store of tropical peat carbon in the world, as its climate is already much drier than that of the other tropical peatlands in the Southeast Asia and the Amazon rainforest. A 2022 study suggests that the geologically recent conditions between 7,500 years ago and 2,000 years ago were already dry enough to cause substantial peat release from this area, and that these conditions are likely to recur in the near future under continued climate change. In this case, Cuvette Centrale would act as one of the tipping points in the climate system at some yet unknown time.

== Other tipping points ==
=== Coral reef die-off ===
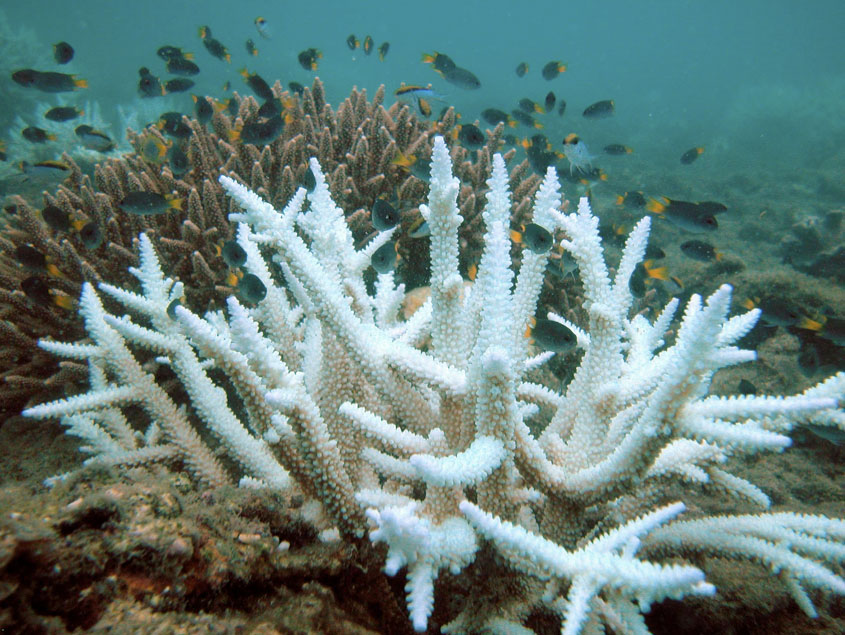
Bleached coral with normal coral in the background

Around 500 million people around the world depend on coral reefs for food, income, tourism and coastal protection. Since the 1980s, this is being threatened by the increase in sea surface temperatures which is triggering mass bleaching of coral, especially in sub-tropical regions. A sustained ocean temperature spike of 1 °C (1.8 °F) above average is enough to cause bleaching. Under heat stress, corals expel the small colourful algae which live in their tissues, which causes them to turn white. The algae, known as zooxanthellae, have a symbiotic relationship with coral such that without them, the corals slowly die. After these zooxanthellae have disappeared, the corals are vulnerable to a transition towards a seaweed-dominated ecosystem, making it very difficult to shift back to a coral-dominated ecosystem. The IPCC estimates that by the time temperatures have risen to 1.5 °C (2.7 °F) above pre-industrial times, "Coral reefs... are projected to decline by a further 70–90%"; and that if the world warms by 2 °C (3.6 °F), they will become extremely rare.

=== Break-up of equatorial stratocumulus clouds ===
In 2019, a study employed a large eddy simulation model to estimate that equatorial stratocumulus clouds could break up and scatter when CO_{2} levels rise above 1,200 ppm (almost three times higher than the current levels, and over 4 times greater than the preindustrial levels). The study estimated that this would cause a surface warming of about 8 °C (14 °F) globally and 10 °C (18 °F) in the subtropics, which would be in addition to at least 4 °C (7.2 °F) already caused by such CO_{2} concentrations. Stratocumulus clouds would not reform until the CO_{2} concentrations drop to a much lower level.

It was suggested that this finding could help explain past episodes of unusually rapid warming such as Paleocene-Eocene Thermal Maximum. In 2020, further work from the same authors revealed that in their large eddy simulation, this tipping point cannot be stopped with solar radiation modification: in a hypothetical scenario where very high CO_{2} emissions continue for a long time but are offset with extensive solar radiation modification, the break-up of stratocumulus clouds is simply delayed until CO_{2} concentrations hit 1,700 ppm, at which point it would still cause around 5 °C (9.0 °F) of unavoidable warming.

However, because large eddy simulation models are simpler and smaller-scale than the general circulation models used for climate projections, with limited representation of atmospheric processes like subsidence, this finding is currently considered speculative. Other scientists say that the model used in that study unrealistically extrapolates the behavior of small cloud areas onto all cloud decks, and that it is incapable of simulating anything other than a rapid transition, with some comparing it to "a knob with two settings". Additionally, CO_{2} concentrations would only reach 1,200 ppm if the world follows Representative Concentration Pathway 8.5, which represents the highest possible greenhouse gas emission scenario and involves a massive expansion of coal infrastructure. In that case, 1,200 ppm would be passed shortly after 2100.

=== Cascading tipping points ===
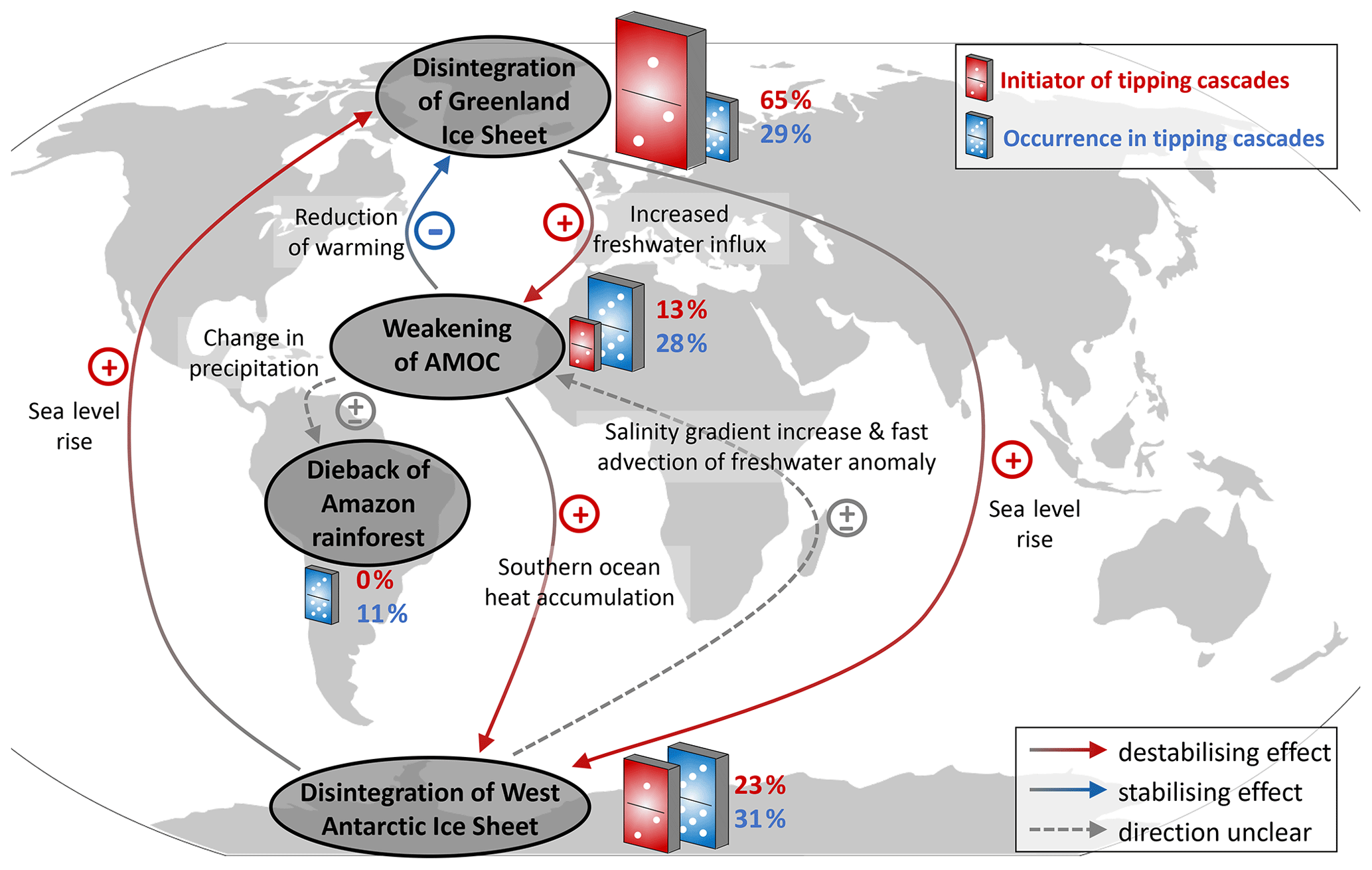
A proposed tipping cascade with four tipping elements

Crossing a threshold in one part of the climate system may trigger another tipping element to tip into a new state. Such sequences of thresholds are called cascading tipping points, an example of a domino effect. Ice loss in West Antarctica and Greenland will significantly alter ocean circulation. Sustained warming of the northern high latitudes as a result of this process could activate tipping elements in that region, such as permafrost degradation, and boreal forest dieback. Thawing permafrost is a threat multiplier because it holds roughly twice as much carbon as the amount currently circulating in the atmosphere. Loss of ice in Greenland likely destabilises the West Antarctic ice sheet via sea level rise, and vice-versa, especially if Greenland were to melt first as West Antarctica is particularly vulnerable to contact with warm sea water.

A 2021 study with three million computer simulations of a climate model showed that nearly one-third of those simulations resulted in domino effects, even when temperature increases were limited to 2 °C (3.6 °F) – the upper limit set by the Paris Agreement in 2015. The authors of the study said that the science of tipping points is so complex that there is great uncertainty as to how they might unfold, but nevertheless, argued that the possibility of cascading tipping points represents "an existential threat to civilisation". A network model analysis suggested that temporary overshoots of climate change – increasing global temperature beyond Paris Agreement goals temporarily as often projected – can substantially increase risks of climate tipping cascades ("by up to 72% compared with non-overshoot scenarios").

== Formerly considered tipping elements ==
Earlier (2008) list of tipping elements in the climate system. When compared to later lists, the major differences are that in 2008 ENSO, Indian summer monsoon, Arctic ozone hole and all of Arctic sea ice were all listed as tipping points. Labrador-Irminger circulation, mountain glaciers and East Antarctic ice however were not included. This 2008 list also includes Antarctic bottom water (part of the Southern Ocean overturning circulation), which was left out of the 2022 list, but included in some subsequent ones.

The possibility that the El Niño–Southern Oscillation (ENSO) is a tipping element had attracted attention in the past. Normally strong winds blow west across the South Pacific Ocean from South America to Australia. Every two to seven years, the winds weaken due to pressure changes and the air and water in the middle of the Pacific warms up, causing changes in wind movement patterns around the globe. This is known as El Niño and typically leads to droughts in India, Indonesia and Brazil, and increased flooding in Peru. In 2015/2016, this caused food shortages affecting over 60 million people.

El Niño-induced droughts may increase the likelihood of forest fires in the Amazon. The threshold for tipping was estimated to be between 3.5 °C (6.3 °F) and 7 °C (13 °F) of global warming in 2016. After tipping, the system would be in a more permanent El Niño state, rather than oscillating between different states. This has happened in Earth's past, in the Pliocene, but the layout of the ocean was significantly different from now.

So far, there is no definitive evidence indicating changes in ENSO behaviour, and the IPCC Sixth Assessment Report concluded that it is "virtually certain that the ENSO will remain the dominant mode of interannual variability in a warmer world". Consequently, the 2022 assessment no longer includes it in the list of likely tipping elements.

The Indian summer monsoon is another part of the climate system which was considered suspectible to irreversible collapse in the earlier research. However, more recent research has demonstrated that warming tends to strengthen the Indian monsoon, and it is projected to strengthen in the future.

Methane hydrate deposits in the Arctic were once thought to be vulnerable to a rapid dissociation which would have a large impact on global temperatures, in a dramatic scenario known as a clathrate gun hypothesis. Later research found that it takes millennia for methane hydrates to respond to warming, while methane emissions from the seafloor rarely transfer from the water column into the atmosphere. IPCC Sixth Assessment Report states "It is very unlikely that gas clathrates (mostly methane) in deeper terrestrial permafrost and subsea clathrates will lead to a detectable departure from the emissions trajectory during this century."

== Mathematical theory ==
An illustration of three types of tipping point; (a), (b) noise-, (c), (d) bifurcation- and (e), (f) rate-induced. (a), (c), (e) example time-series (coloured lines) through the tipping point with black solid lines indicating stable climate states (e.g. low or high rainfall) and dashed lines represent the boundary between stable states. (b), (d), (f) stability landscapes provide an understanding for the different types of tipping point. The valleys represent different climate states the system can occupy with hill tops separating the stable states.

Tipping point behaviour in the climate can be described in mathematical terms. Three types of tipping points have been identified—bifurcation, noise-induced and rate-dependent.

=== Bifurcation-induced tipping ===
Bifurcation-induced tipping happens when a particular parameter in the climate (for instance a change in environmental conditions or forcing), passes a critical level – at which point a bifurcation takes place – and what was a stable state loses its stability or simply disappears. The Atlantic Meridional Overturning Circulation (AMOC) is an example of a tipping element that can show bifurcation-induced tipping. Slow changes to the bifurcation parameters in this system – the salinity and temperature of the water – may push the circulation towards collapse.

Many types of bifurcations show hysteresis, which is the dependence of the state of a system on its history. For instance, depending on how warm it was in the past, there can be differing amounts of ice on the poles at the same concentration of greenhouse gases or temperature.

==== Early warning signals ====
For tipping points that occur because of a bifurcation, it may be possible to detect whether a system is getting closer to a tipping point, as it becomes less resilient to perturbations on approach of the tipping threshold. These systems display critical slowing down, with an increased memory (rising autocorrelation) and variance. Depending on the nature of the tipping system, there may be other types of early warning signals. Abrupt change is not an early warning signal (EWS) for tipping points, as abrupt change can also occur if the changes are reversible to the control parameter.

These EWSs are often developed and tested using time series from the paleo record, like sediments, ice caps, and tree rings, where past examples of tipping can be observed. It is not always possible to say whether increased variance and autocorrelation is a precursor to tipping, or caused by internal variability, for instance in the case of the collapse of the AMOC.

Quality limitations of paleodata further complicate the development of EWSs. They have been developed for detecting tipping due to drought in forests in California, and melting of the Pine Island Glacier in West Antarctica, among other systems. Using early warning signals (increased autocorrelation and variance of the melt rate time series), it has been suggested that the Greenland ice sheet is currently losing resilience, consistent with modelled early warning signals of the ice sheet.

Human-induced changes in the climate system may be too fast for early warning signals to become evident, especially in systems with inertia.

=== Noise-induced tipping ===
Noise-induced tipping is the transition from one state to another due to random fluctuations or internal variability of the system. Noise-induced transitions do not show any of the early warning signals which occur with bifurcations. This means they are unpredictable because the underlying potential does not change. Because they are unpredictable, such occurrences are often described as a "one-in-x-year" event. An example is the Dansgaard–Oeschger events during the last ice age, with 25 occurrences of sudden climate fluctuations over a 500-year period.

=== Rate-induced tipping ===
Rate-induced tipping occurs when a change in the environment is faster than the force that restores the system to its stable state. In peatlands, for instance, after years of relative stability, rate-induced tipping can lead to an "explosive release of soil carbon from peatlands into the atmosphere" – sometimes known as "compost bomb instability". The AMOC may also show rate-induced tipping: if the rate of ice melt increases too fast, it may collapse, even before the ice melt reaches the critical value where the system would undergo a bifurcation.

== Potential impacts ==
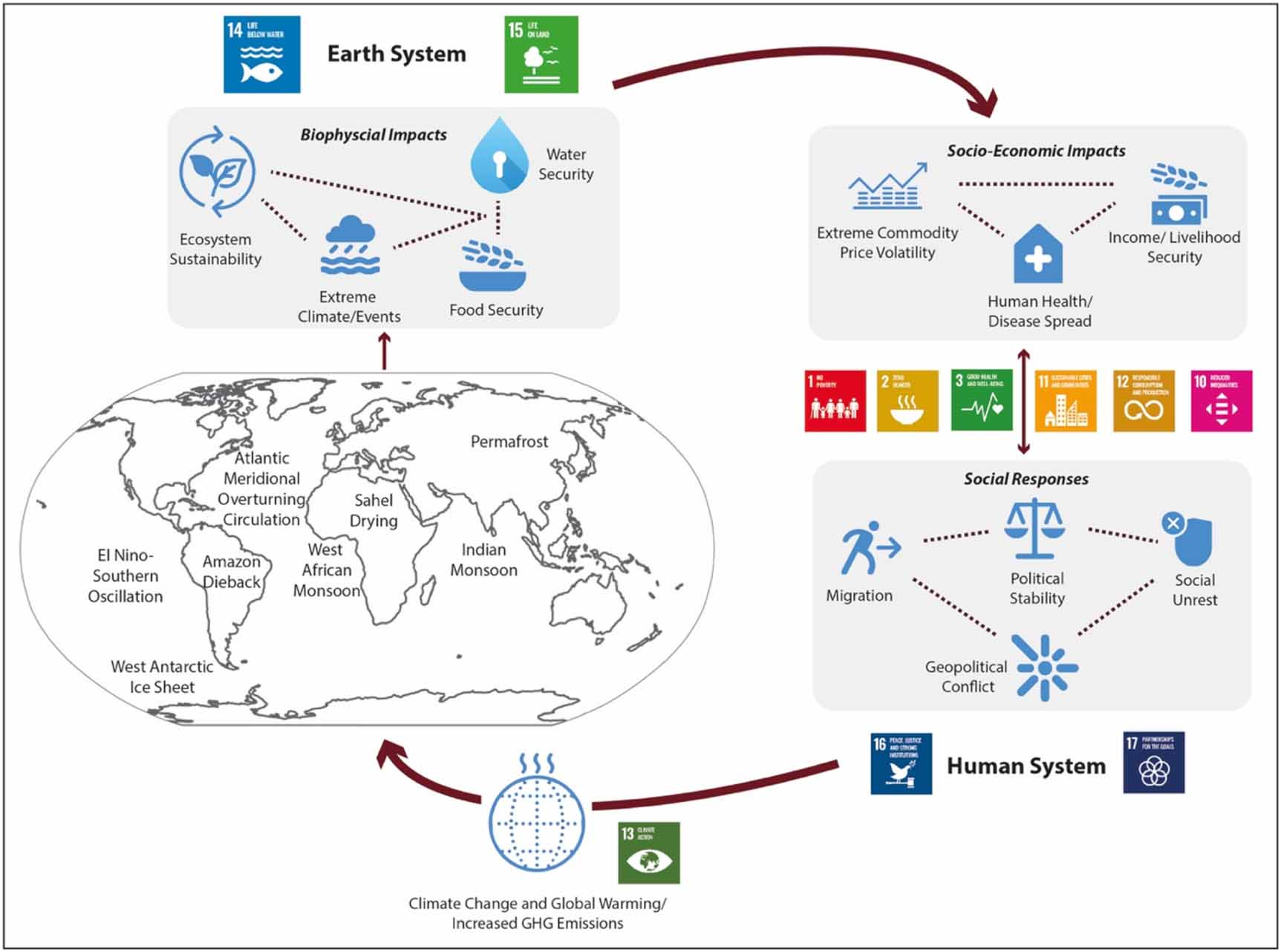
A schematic of some possible interactions and cascading effects between the Earth's climate system and humanity's social system

Tipping points can have very severe impacts. They can exacerbate current dangerous impacts of climate change, or give rise to new impacts. Some potential tipping points would take place abruptly, such as disruptions to the Indian monsoon, with severe impacts on food security for hundreds of millions. Other impacts would likely take place over longer timescales, such as the melting of the ice caps. The circa 10 metres (33 ft) of sea level rise from the combined melt of Greenland and West Antarctica would require moving many cities inland over the course of centuries, but would also accelerate sea level rise this century, with Antarctic ice sheet instability projected to expose 120 million more people to annual floods in a mid-emissions scenario.

A collapse of the Atlantic Overturning Circulation would cause over 10 °C of cooling in parts of Europe, cause drying in Europe, Central America, West Africa, and southern Asia, and lead to about 1 metre (3 1/2 ft) of sea level rise in the North Atlantic. The impacts of AMOC collapse would have serious implications for food security, with one projection showing reduced yields of key crops across most world regions, with for example arable agriculture becoming economically infeasible in Britain.

These impacts could happen simultaneously in the case of cascading tipping points. A review of abrupt changes over the last 30,000 years showed that tipping points can lead to a large set of cascading impacts in climate, ecological and social systems. For instance, the abrupt termination of the African humid period cascaded, and desertification and regime shifts led to the retreat of pastoral societies in North Africa and a change of dynasty in Egypt.

Some scholars have proposed a threshold which, if crossed, could trigger multiple tipping points and self-reinforcing feedback loops that would prevent stabilisation of the climate, causing much greater warming and sea-level rises and leading to severe disruption to ecosystems, society, and economies. This scenario is sometimes called the Hothouse Earth scenario. The researchers proposed that this scenario could unfold beyond a threshold of around 2 °C above pre-industrial levels. However, while this scenario is possible, the existence and value of this threshold remains speculative, and doubts have been raised if tipping points would lock in much extra warming in the shorter term.

Decisions taken over the next decade could influence the climate of the planet for tens to hundreds of thousands of years and potentially even lead to conditions which are inhospitable to current human societies. The report also states that there is a possibility of a cascade of tipping points being triggered even if the goal outlined in the Paris Agreement to limit warming to 1.5–2.0 °C (2.7–3.6 °F) is achieved.

== Geological timescales ==
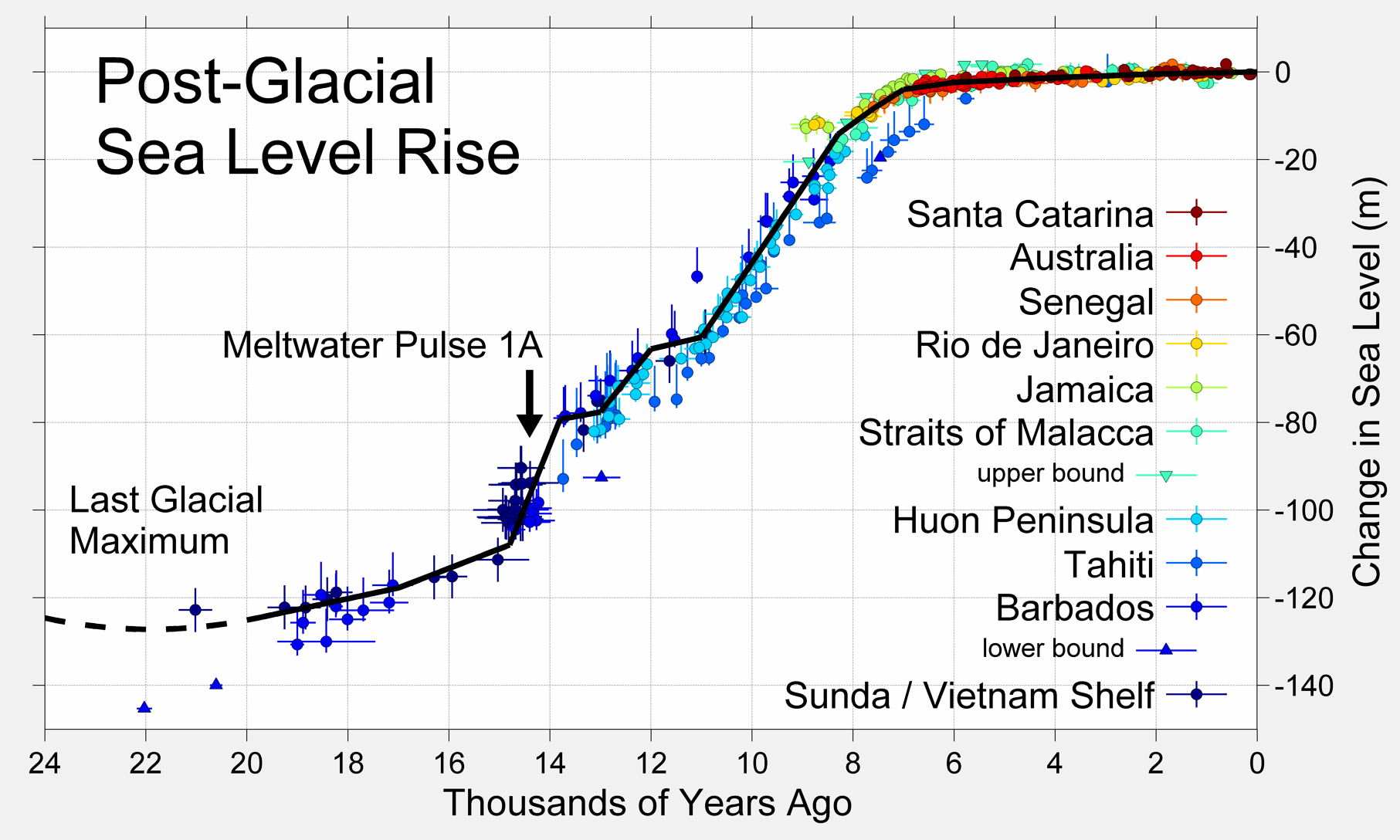
Meltwater pulse 1A was a period of abrupt sea level rise around 14,000 years ago. It may be an example of a tipping point.

The geological record shows many abrupt changes on geologic time scales that suggest tipping points may have been crossed in pre-historic times. For instance, the Dansgaard–Oeschger events during the last ice age were periods of abrupt warming (within decades) in Greenland and Europe, that may have involved the abrupt changes in major ocean currents. During the deglaciation in the early Holocene, sea level rise was not smooth, but rose abruptly during meltwater pulses. The monsoon in North Africa saw abrupt changes on decadal timescales during the African humid period. This period, spanning from 15,000 to 5,000 years ago, also ended suddenly in a drier state.

=== Runaway greenhouse effect ===
A runaway greenhouse effect is a tipping point so extreme that oceans evaporate and the water vapour escapes to space, an irreversible climate state that happened on Venus. A runaway greenhouse effect has virtually no chance of being caused by people. Venus-like conditions on the Earth require a large long-term forcing that is unlikely to occur until the sun brightens by a ten of percents, which will take 600–700 million years.

== See also ==
- Climate change scenario – Hypothetical representation of potential future conditions
- Climate sensitivity – Concept in climate science
- Greenhouse and icehouse Earth – Opposing climate states on Earth
- Planetary boundaries – Limits to safe impact on the Earth ecology
- World Scientists' Warning to Humanity – 1992 document on human carbon footprint
