= Front (oceanography) =

Boundary between two distinct water masses

In oceanography, a front is a boundary between two distinct water masses. The formation of fronts depends on multiple physical processes and small differences in these lead to a wide range of front types. They can be as narrow as a few hundreds of metres and as wide as several tens of kilometres. While most fronts form and dissipate relatively quickly, some can persist for long periods of time.

== Definition of fronts ==
Traditionally, ocean fronts have been defined as the boundary between two distinct water masses. However, the current use of satellite data allows a dynamical and higher resolution definition based on the presence of strong currents.

=== Traditional definition ===
The historical definition of fronts using water masses, bodies of water that differ in physical properties such as temperature and salinity, relied on the low-resolution data obtained from research cruises. As it took a long time to combine these data, the obtained front positions gave a time-averaged view showing only the broad-scale structure. For example, in the Southern Ocean, this led to the definition of five fronts that were all considered to be continuous and circumpolar, reaching to large depths and being strongly influenced by bathymetry. The water masses on either side of such fronts differ in temperatures, salinities, or densities, along with differences in other oceanographic markers.

=== Dynamical definition ===
Since the advent of high-resolution satellite data, a different view of ocean fronts has been formed. By continuously measuring sea-surface height (SSH) around the globe, the position of strong currents or jets associated with ocean fronts can be determined at a very high spatial and temporal resolution. This way, short term variability and trends can be analysed and related to other climatological variations, such as El Niño - Southern Oscillation. Using this method, the fronts in the Southern Ocean are no longer circumpolar and the amount of fronts depends on the location and time.

=== Spatial definitions ===
In addition to the physical definitions described above, it is also possible to separate fronts using a spatial definition. Locally, fronts are often determined using gradient thresholding: the position of the front is determined based on where the spatial gradient of a quantity, such as sea-surface height or temperature, exceeds a certain threshold. This resembles the dynamical definition of fronts from strong currents described above. When defining fronts on a global scale, often specific values of sea-surface height or temperature are used, resembling the traditional water mass definition.

== Formation of fronts ==
The process of front formation is called frontogenesis. In this process, several factors play a role, including ocean currents, wind, and Coriolis forces. For example, equatorward winds along the west coast or poleward winds along the east coasts of continents can create gradients in vertical motion. These lead to an Ekman flow and can lead to the formation of upwelling fronts. In a similar way, inertial intensification of western boundary currents helps produce Western boundary current fronts.

== Type of fronts ==
Differences in the location and formation processes lead to a wide range of front types. Below, several major types are described based on the location where they can be found, but still these definitions can be partially overlapping.

=== Estuarine fronts ===
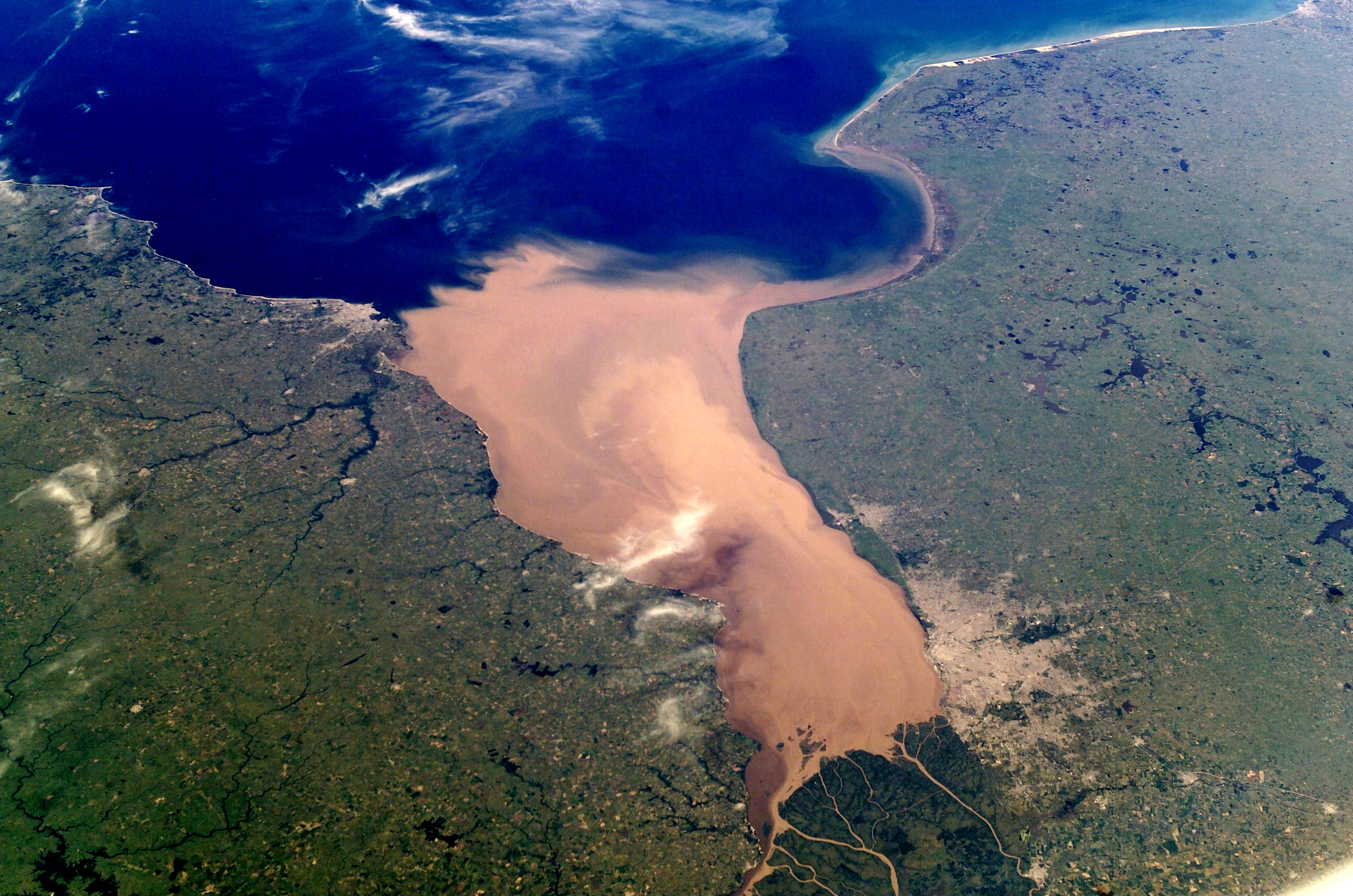
Surface estuarine front of the Río de la Plata estuary. The exact location of the color change, implying a change from fresh- to saltwater, depends on winds and currents. Photograph taken by NASA.

Some of the strongest fronts that can be found occur in estuaries. In these regions, the fresh river inflow meets the much more saline seawater, forming strong salinity gradients and leading to the formation of a salinity front. A large difference between most other ocean fronts is that estuarine fronts often occur on a smaller spatial scale, thereby allowing only a limited effect of Coriolis forcing and geostrophic motion. As these fronts are not in inertial balance, they need a constant source of energy to survive, explaining their relatively short lifetime. On the other hand, this also makes that these fronts can form relatively fast compared to larger fronts.

Estuarine fronts can be divided into two main categories depending on the depth range at which they occur: surface fronts and bottom fronts.

==== Surface fronts ====
Fronts at the surface can often be seen visually, for example as a line of foam forming due to the converging of the water masses, or changes in color due to differences in sediment transport. The latter makes that estuarine fronts can often also be considered as turbidity fronts, as rivers can carry a large amount of sediment in suspension. Different estuarine surface fronts can form depending on the influence of tidal currents.

- Plume fronts: In an estuary with limited tidal influence, the energy available to mix waters can be limited. This allows the more buoyant outflowing freshwater to form a layer at the surface, spreading seaward especially during ebb. At the boundary between this freshwater plume and the surrounding seawater, strong gradients in salinity and density will form. An example of such a front is located in the Chesapeake Bay estuary, but these fronts are also common in front of river outlets such as the Mississippi, Amazon, or Connecticut River.
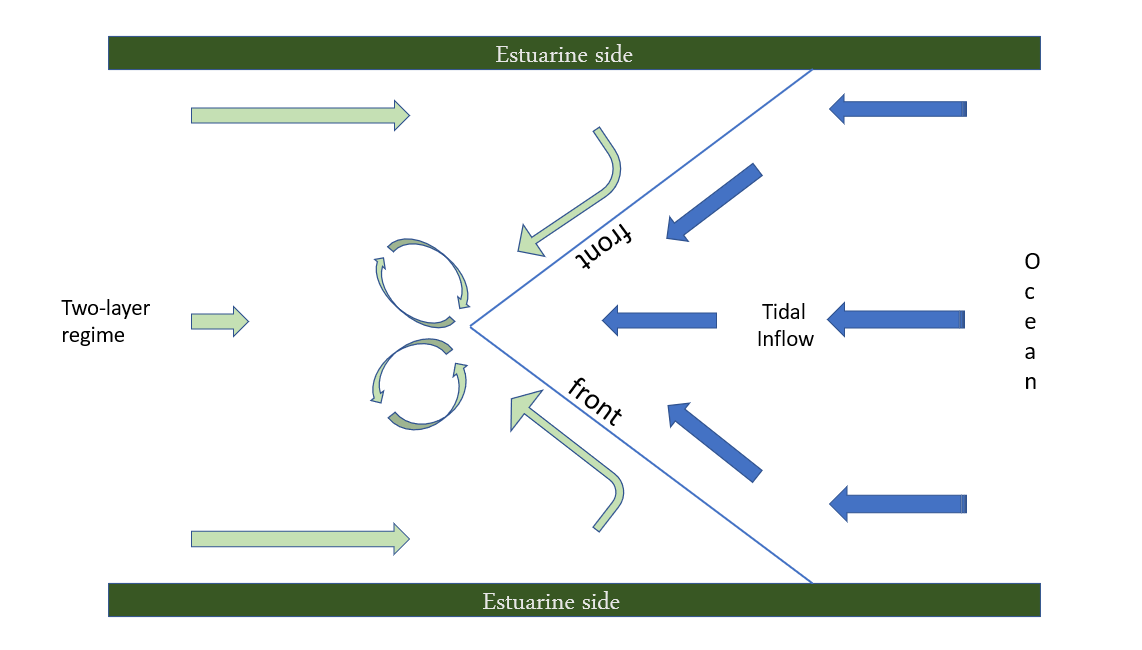
  The schematic illustration of the tidal intrusion front with the flow pattern at the surface.
- Tidal intrusion fronts: Generally, very large tidal ranges in estuaries will lead to mixing of the waters and thereby inhibit front formation. However, in some especially smaller estuaries, a front can form during the flood phase of the tide. In this case, as outflowing fresh waters from the river converge with the saline inflowing water during flood, the fresh water layer at the surface is pushed back while the saline water sinks to the bottom. This leads to strong salinity gradients and forms a front in a characteristic V-shape. On the freshwater side of the front, eddies can form and recirculate water and material at the surface. Such fronts can be found in, among others, the Welsh Seiont Estuary, the Scottish Loch Creran, and South African Palmiet estuary.
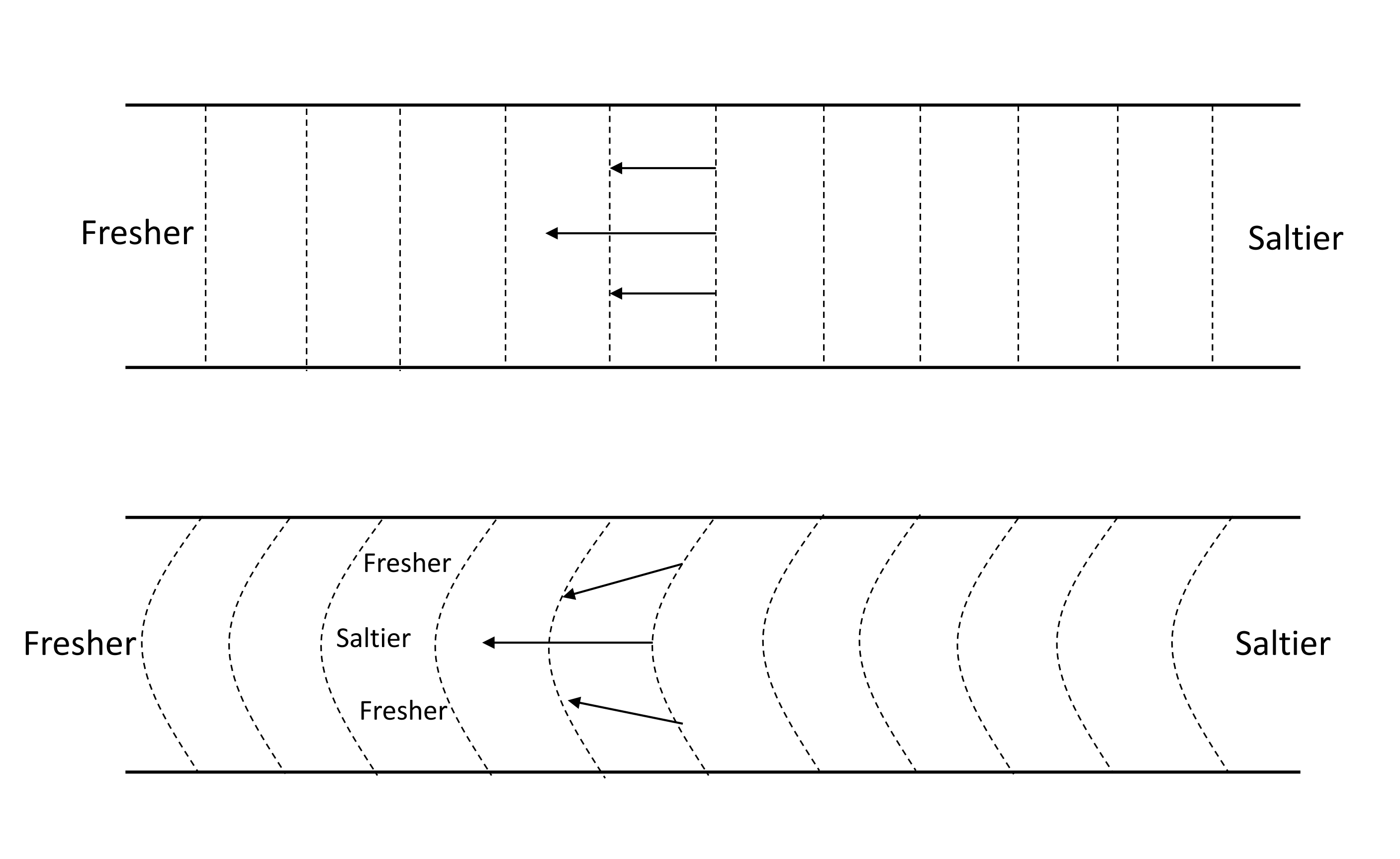
- Formation of an axial convergence, longitudinal or shear front. The inflow of ocean water during the flood phase occurs at higher speeds in the centre of the estuary. This leads to gradients in velocity and shear that bring the water towards the centre at the surface and lead to a converging circulation.
  Axial convergence, longitudinal or shear fronts: In estuaries where the tidal flow is even stronger, the fresh river and saline ocean waters will become well-mixed. As the middle of an estuary is generally deeper than the sides, differences in horizontal shear arise. This leads to higher velocities in the middle of the estuary than at the sides. In addition, the shear will also be higher at the bottom of the river, creating a vertical velocity gradient. Together, these gradients will lead to a converging circulation that can stretch very far into the estuary. This distance is influenced by the differences in density in the longitudinal direction (along the axis of the river). Such a front can be observed in, for example, the Conwy estuary, or York River Estuary.

==== Basal or bottom fronts ====
Another group of estuarine fronts is especially strong at the bottom of the estuary.

- Salt-wedge fronts: A salt-wedge front is often related to a plume front. Weak tidal motions allow the mixing between the saline and fresh water to be limited, which in addition to the outflowing freshwater allows an inflow of saline water along the bottom of the estuary. At the head of this intrusion, a strong gradient in salinity occurs, which marks the position of the salt-wedge front. Example of such a fronts are those in the Fraser, Merrimack, and Río de la Plata estuaries.

=== Shallow shelf sea fronts ===
In the shallow seas at the continental shelf, two main types of front can form depending on the processes that play a role.

==== Tidal mixing front ====
In summer, away from sources of freshwater, temperate shelf seas are separated into thermally-stratified regions, influenced by the differences in buoyancy of layers, and vertically well-mixed regions, which are strongly influenced by tidal mixing. The regions between these two are called tidal mixing fronts. This mixing generally extends only to a depth of around 50 meters, or up to 100 meters in some cases, with horizontal temperature gradients of typically 1 °C km^{−1}. The large temperature gradients exhibited by the fronts are clearly apparent in satellite infrared (I-R) imagery of the sea surface which provides a useful way of keeping track of the position of fronts and following their evolution.

==== Shelf-break front ====
Shelf-break fronts are the most common frontal type. These fronts are aligned with the shelf break, the location where the relatively flat continental shelf transitions into the steeper continental slope, and are under influence of mainly tidal and wind-driven mixing. At these locations, water on the shelf is separated from the off-shelf oceanic water. Contrary to for example the tidal mixing fronts, these fronts can be considered as water mass fronts as they separate two distinct water masses: onshore and offshore. These fronts are always associated with a well-defined current. Examples of shelf-break fronts occur in the Mid-Atlantic Bight and Bay of Biscay.

Mechanism of upwelling near the coast creating upwelling coastal front.

=== Coastal upwelling fronts ===
Near coastal zones, winds blowing parallel to the coast can generate wind-driven currents that create an Ekman transport away from the coast. This moves the upper water mass away from the coast and leads to upwelling of cooler water from depth, also termed coastal upwelling. The contrast between the cold water from depth and warmer surface water leads to the formation of coastal upwelling fronts. Examples of such fronts occur off the coast of Washington-Oregon-California and Peru-Chile.

=== Western boundary current fronts ===
In general, strong currents called western boundary currents form at the eastern boundary of continents. These strong currents can transport water masses over a large distance, bringing them in contact with water masses that have very different properties. These differences in properties together with factors such as speed cause very strong gradients between the western boundary currents and the surrounding water, leading to the formation of western boundary current fronts. These fronts are among the strongest fronts that can be observed and can extend many thousands of kilometres in length. Examples of such fronts occur with the Gulf Stream, Kuroshio and Agulhas Currents.

=== Equatorial upwelling fronts ===
In addition to coastal upwelling, strong upwelling also occurs along the equator. In this case, the Coriolis force is small near the equator as it changes sign between the hemispheres. The westward trade winds then lead to an Ekman transport that moves the surface waters away from the equator in both hemispheres. The replacing upwelling water will be colder than the surrounding surface waters, again creating a strong vertical gradient in temperature that leads to the formation of a front. As the location of the trade winds varies seasonally, the location of the equatorial upwelling front does so as well. This type of front can be found mainly in the Atlantic and Pacific Oceans. In the Indian Ocean, however, these fronts are not as strong. This is probably due to the difference between the ocean basins, as the Indian Ocean only extends slightly northward of the equator while the other basins reach to the north pole.

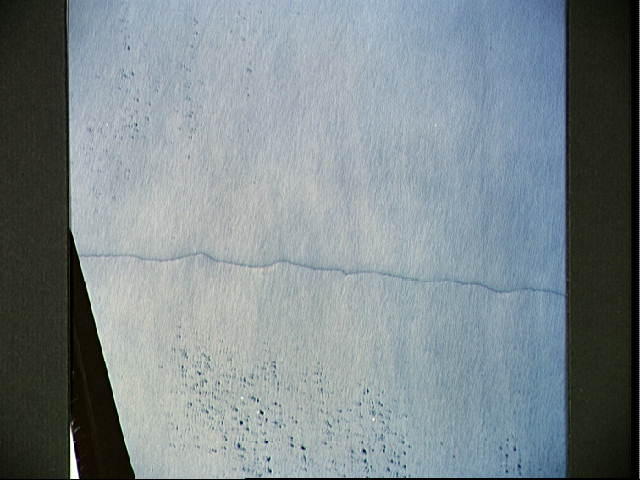
The Pacific white line, shown here, is an example of a subtropical convergence front. In this case, the buoyant diatom rhizosolenia is collecting at the front in such large quantities as to be visible from space.

=== Subtropical convergence fronts ===
The subtropical region is surrounded by eastward-blowing winds at higher latitudes and westward-blowing winds at lower latitudes. The Ekman transport associated with these winds in both cases directs a flow of water towards the subtropics, leading to the convergence of colder water from the mid-latitudes and warmer waters from the tropics here. This leads to the formation of a subtropical convergence front. As the water masses on both sides of the front have different temperatures, this creates a strong temperature gradient and makes that such fronts can be seen as thermal fronts. In addition, the build-up of water at this region leads to a slight increase in sea level. This increases the pressure on the water column, and results in downwelling. In some cases, this can support local marine communities as organisms, such as sargassum, that float in the upper ocean layers will move towards the front with the water and remain in the upper layers close to the front. Examples of subtropical convergence fronts can be found in among others the Sargasso Sea and North Pacific Ocean, but also in the southern parts of the Atlantic, Indian, and Pacific Oceans.

=== Marginal ice zone fronts ===
Two types of fronts can be generated around sea ice edges depending on the depth where they occur. The main difference between these two arises by the release of salt during sea ice formation, called brine rejection. This generates a convection driven by salinity, bringing the saline waters to greater depth. During the melting of sea ice, the salinity in the surface waters decreases due to the input of fresh water. This creates a local salinity front between the more saline deeper waters and the low-salinity surface meltwater.

- Upper-layer fronts: In the upper layer, one type of marginal ice zone fronts can be found and is widespread along the ice edge. These upper-layer fronts are caused by the difference in temperatures between the warm waters in the upper-layer and the cold ice.
- Lower-layer fronts: A second type of marginal ice zone front is the lower-layer front. This type can be found in the lower layer between the resident winter bottom water and summer water.

The upper- and lower-layer fronts may be separated where the ocean currents hit perpendicular to the ice, which often occurs for example in bays. However, for example in ice peninsulas, low lateral turbulence can cause these fronts to coincide.

In general, examples of marginal ice zone fronts can be found in the Labrador and Greenland Sea, and in the Southern Ocean.

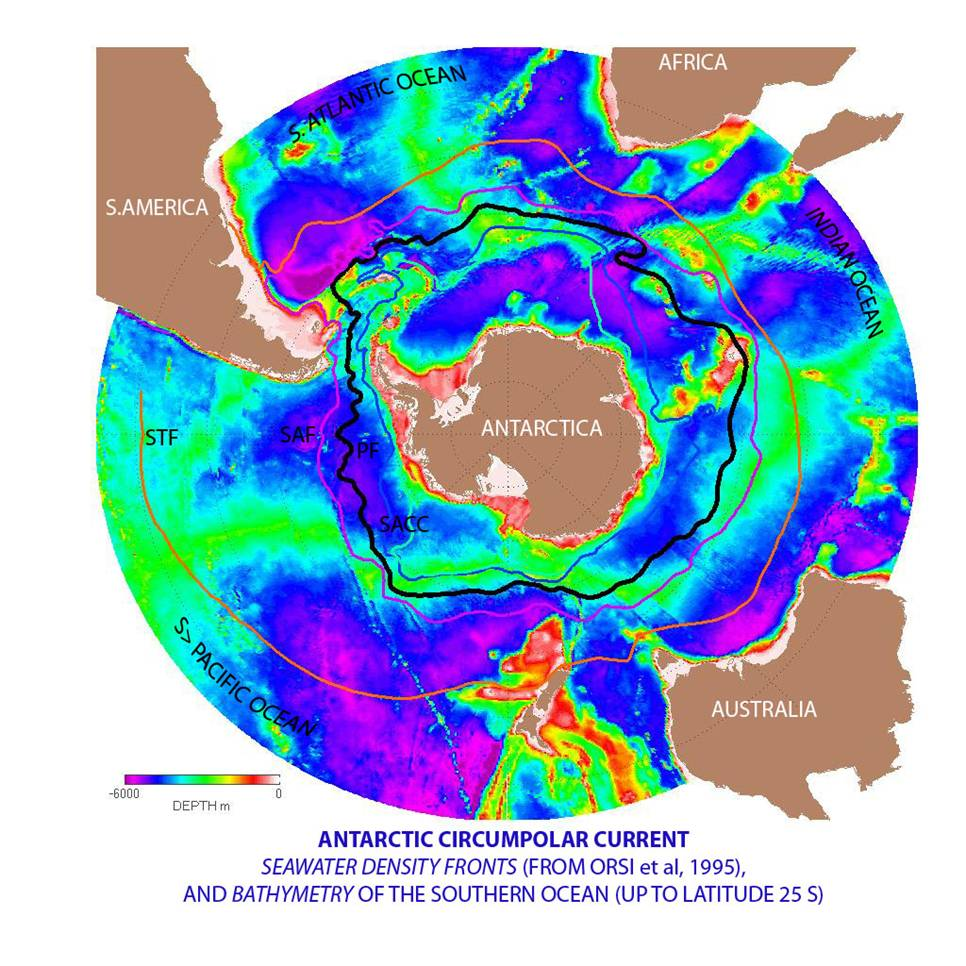
Rough position of the three Southern Ocean fronts related to the Antarctic Circumpolar Current: Southern Antarctic Circumpolar Current Front (SACC), Antarctic Polar Front (PF), and Subantarctic Front (SAF). In addition, the Subtropical convergence Front (STF) is shown.

=== Southern Ocean fronts ===
A very important set of fronts occurs in the Southern Ocean. This basin is characterised by the intense eastward-flowing Antarctic Circumpolar Current (ACC), which is one of the most powerful current systems on Earth. In addition, the different water masses that meet in this basin are associated with strong gradients in density that reach to great depth and lead to strongly tilted isopycnals surfaces (planes of constant density) that shallow towards the south. Together, these dynamics lead to the formation of strong and persistent fronts. Using the traditional definition of fronts, this is the only ocean basin where circumpolar fronts can be found. Still, the structure of the fronts around Antarctica rearranges itself several times, which leads to the splitting of a single front into numerous smaller sub-fronts.

Within the ACC (from north to south), the defined fronts are the Sub-Antarctic Front (SAF), Antarctic Polar Front (APF), and Southern ACC Front (SACCF). However, south of these three fronts, two more fronts can be defined: the Southern Boundary Front (SBF) and the Antarctic Slope Front (ASF). The ASF forms between the shelf water near the Antarctic continent and the offshore oceanic water, and therefore could also be considered as a shelf-break front. However, in this case, the front is influenced by an additional process, namely katabatic winds. These transport high-density air from a higher elevation downslope under the force of gravity and help maintain the westward current over the shelf and thus the front.

== Importance of fronts ==
Fronts are important in many aspects. Some frontal types, such as upwelling and convergence fronts, are sites of pronounced exchange between deep and surface ocean and can catalyse the generation of mesoscale eddies and submesoscale filaments. Upwelling fronts can bring nutrients to the surface and lead to phytoplankton growth. This phytoplankton growth can in turn support other marine organisms in the area. Some fronts create hotspots of marine biodiversity and biogeochemical processes when they inject macronutrients from an adjacent nutrient-rich water mass into a nutrient-limited and physically stable euphotic zone, enhancing new primary production. Indeed, Southern Ocean fronts divided this Ocean into a number of distinct biophysical zones, and hence a number of distinct habitats, which in turn support distinct biota. Because coastal waters are generally more nutrient-rich than offshore waters, the shelf sea fronts often mark stark biogeochemical boundaries. However, strong mixing that occurs at some fronts can provide nutrients to the euphotic zone and enhance productivity. The surplus of carbon biomass produced on fronts may be exported downwards, feeding deeper pelagic and benthic communities. The downwards transport of carbon biomass is an important pathway in the global carbon cycle, particularly in shallow seas where part of the particulate organic carbon fixed by photosynthesis accumulates in bottom sediments.
