= IP25 =

IP25 or IP_{25} can refer to

- Abbreviation of Highly branched isoprenoid I
- Hybrid IP25, a radio system made by EF Johnson Technologies
- An SGI Challenge CPU board
