= Neritic zone =

Relatively shallow part of the ocean above the drop-off of the continental shelf

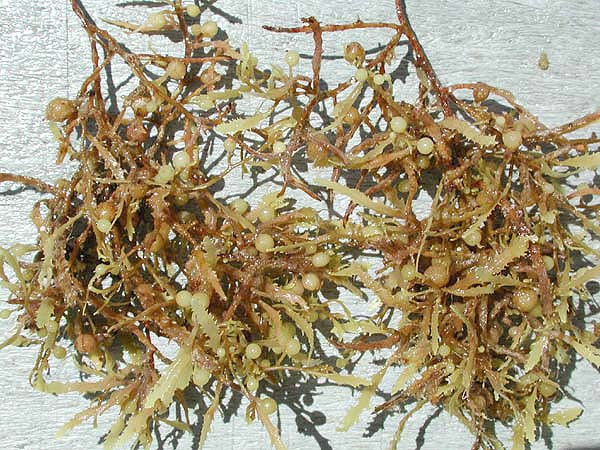
Sargassum seaweed drifting in the neritic zone provides food and shelter for small epipelagic fish.

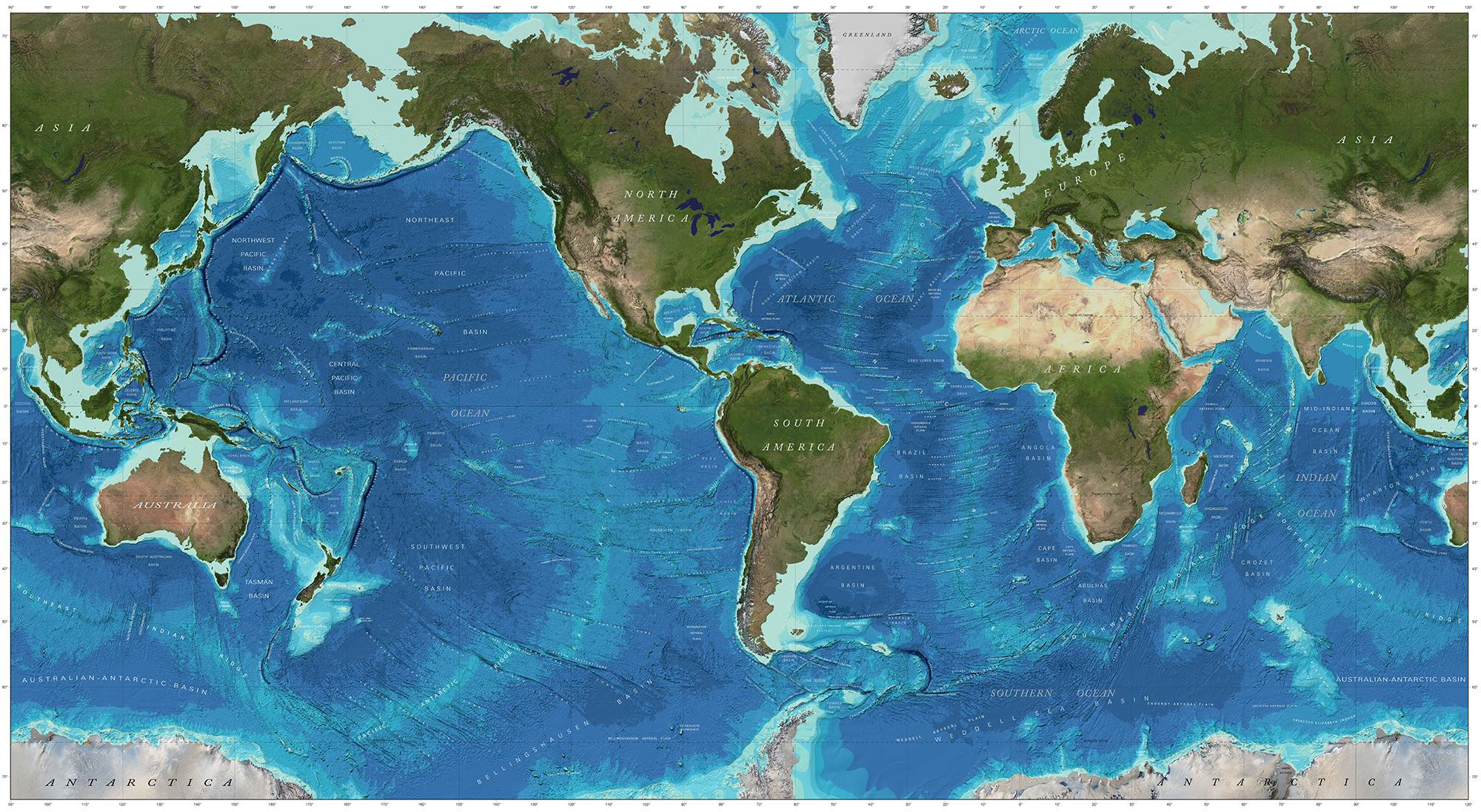
As highlighted in light green, the neritic zone coincides with the relative shallows of the continental shelves.

The neritic zone (or sublittoral zone) is the relatively shallow part of the ocean above the drop-off of the continental shelf, approximately 200 meters (660 ft) in depth. From the point of view of marine biology it forms a relatively stable and well-illuminated environment for marine life, from plankton up to large fish and corals, while physical oceanography sees it as where the oceanic system interacts with the coast.

== Definition (marine biology), context, extra terminology ==
In marine biology, the neritic zone, also called coastal waters, the coastal ocean or the sublittoral zone, refers to the zone of the ocean where sunlight reaches the ocean floor, that is where the water is never so deep as to take it out of the photic zone.

== Physical characteristics ==
The neritic zone is covered with generally well-oxygenated water, receives plenty of sunlight, is relatively stable temperature, has low water pressure and stable salinity levels, making it highly suitable for photosynthetic life. There are several different areas or zones in the ocean. The area along the bottom of any body of water from the shore to the deepest abyss is called the benthic zone. It is where decomposed organic debris (also known as ocean 'snow') has settled to form a sediment layer. All photosynthetic life needs light to grow and how far out into the ocean light can still penetrate through the water column to the floor or benthic zone is what defines the neritic zone. That photic zone, or area where light can penetrate through the water column, is usually above ~100 meters (~328 feet). Some coastal areas have a long area of shallow water that extends far out beyond the landmass into the water and others, for example islands that have formed from ancient volcanos where the 'shelf' or edge of the land mass is very steep, have a very short neritic zone.

== Life forms ==
The above characteristics make the neritic zone the location of the majority of sea life. The result is high primary production by photosynthetic life such as phytoplankton and floating sargassum; zooplankton, free-floating creatures ranging from microscopic foraminiferans to small fish and shrimp, feed on the phytoplankton (and one another); both trophic levels in turn form the base of the food chain (or, more properly, web) which supports most of the world's great wild fisheries. Corals are also mostly found in the neritic zone, where they are more common than in the intertidal zone as they have less change with which to deal.

== Definition (physical oceanography) ==
In physical oceanography, the sublittoral zone refers to coastal regions with significant tidal flows and energy dissipation, including non-linear flows, internal waves, river outflows and ocean fronts. As in marine biology, the zone typically extends to the edge of the continental shelf.

== See also ==
- Coastal fish
