= Highly branched isoprenoid =

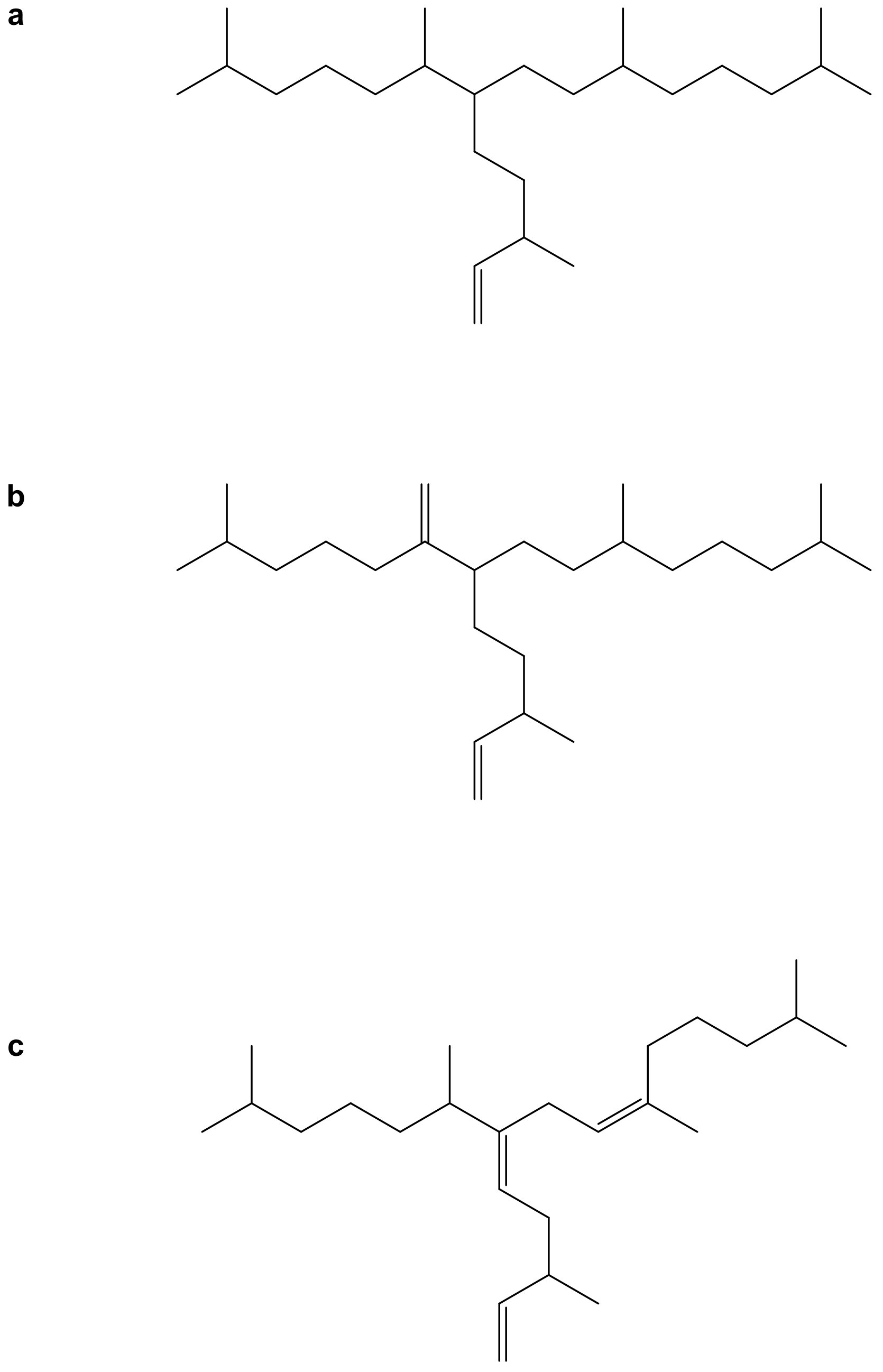
Three major C_{25} Highly branched isoprenoids are used to reconstruct sea ice: (a) Highly branched isoprenoid I (IP_{25}), (b) Highly branched isoprenoid II (IPSO_{25}), and (c) Highly branched isoprenoid III.

Highly branched isoprenoids (HBIs) are long-chain alkenes produced by a small number of marine diatoms. There are a variety of highly branched isoprenoid structures, but C_{25} Highly branched isoprenoids containing one to three double bonds are the most common in the sedimentary record. Highly branched isoprenoids have been used as environmental proxies for sea ice conditions in the Arctic and Antarctic throughout the Holocene, and more recently, are being used to reconstruct more ancient ice records.

== Background ==
Highly branched isoprenoids are a type of lipid produced by marine diatoms. Highly branched isoprenoids are biomarkers, and their presence or absence in sedimentary and ice records can be used as a direct proxy for the presence of sea ice. Generally, the highly branched isoprenoids that are used as sea ice proxies are 25-carbon molecules containing one to three double bonds. The longest carbon chains in the C_{25} highly branched isoprenoids used for sea ice reconstructions are 15 carbons, but these molecules are highly branched and have shorter carbon chains attached to the primary carbon chain. There are 3 C_{25} highly branched isoprenoids used as ice proxies: a C_{25} monoene (HBI I), a C_{25} diene (HBI II), and a C_{25} triene (HBI III). Highly branched isoprenoid I and II are unique in that they are primarily produced by sympagic diatoms. Sympagic diatoms live in channels at the base of sea ice, making them a highly accurate proxy for sea ice. During the spring, highly branched isoprenoids are produced by diatoms in the sea ice. In the summer, the ice melts, releasing the highly branched isoprenoids into the water column, where they sink and are then deposited in the sediments. Highly branched isoprenoids I and II are generally absent from regions which experience no sea ice cover, supporting their use as a proxy for seasonal sea ice. Highly branched isoprenoid III is produced by pelagic algae, or algae that thrives in the open ocean. Highly branched isoprenoid III can be used as a biomarker for seasonal sea ice in the open ocean.

Highly branched isoprenoids were first discovered in 1976 by Patrick Gearing in sediments in the Gulf of Mexico off the coast of Florida in a survey of hydrocarbons in shelf sediments. Following this initial identification, highly branched isoprenoids were identified in a variety of marine environments, such as in the Puget Sound, Antarctica, Spain, and Peru. C_{25} Highly branched isoprenoids were first identified in marine diatoms by John Volkman in 1994, when he isolated seven different C_{25} highly branched isoprenoids from the marine diatom Haslea ostrearia. This provided initial evidence that highly branched isoprenoids are produced by marine diatoms.

Currently, the precise biological functions of highly branched isoprenoids are not well-understood. Highly branched isoprenoids are a type of isoprenoid lipid, which have a variety of vital biological functions. Isoprenoids are important in regulating gene expression, making up cell membranes, and are important in electron transport and photosynthesis.

=== Highly branched isoprenoid I ===
IP_{25}
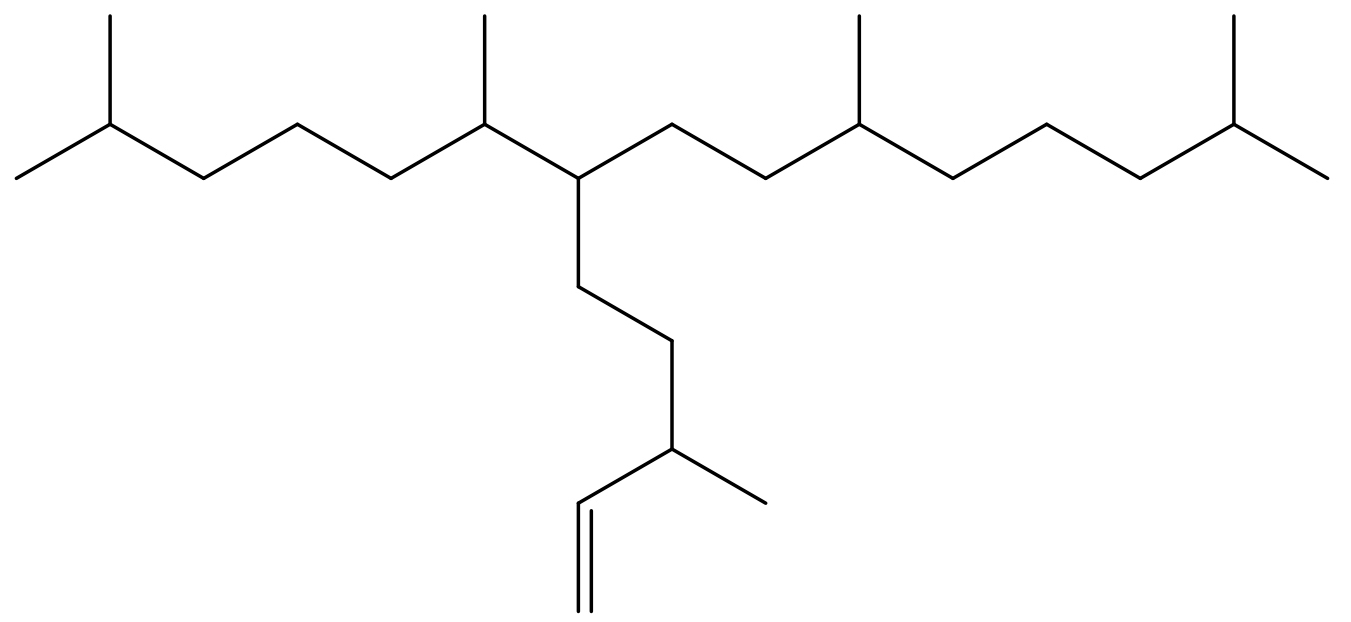

Names
- IUPAC name 2,6,10,14-tetramethyl-7-(3-methylpent-4-enyl)pentadecane

Identifiers
3D model (JSmol)	Interactive image
ChemSpider	24823126
PubChem CID	42608273
- InChI: InChI=1S/C25H50/c1-9-22(6)16-18-25(24(8)15-11-13-21(4)5)19-17-23(7)14-10-12-20(2)3/h9,20-25H,1,10-19H2,2-8H3 Key: BZFIQKGXWZTFQC-UHFFFAOYSA-N
- SMILES: CC(C)CCCC(C)CCC(CCC(C)C=C)C(C)CCCC(C)C

Properties
Chemical formula	C_{25}H_{50}
Molar mass	350.675 g·mol^{−1}
- Except where otherwise noted, data are given for materials in their standard state (at 25 °C [77 °F], 100 kPa). Infobox references

Highly branched isoprenoid (HBI I), a C_{25} monoene, is also known as IP_{25} (ice proxy with 25 carbon atoms). IP_{25} serves as a biomarker for ice conditions in the Arctic. This highly branched isoprenoid is characterized by a single double bond and was first identified in marine diatoms by Thomas Brown in 2014. A variety of diatoms have been shown to produce IP_{25}, with the majority of highly branched isoprenoids produced by the Arctic diatoms Haslea crucigeroides, Haslea spicula, Haslea kjellmanii, and Pleurosigma stuxbergii var. rhomboids. Despite the fact that these species do not comprise much of the sympagic diatom communities globally, they are common in the Arctic. To date, IP_{25} has been identified in over 500 Arctic samples.

=== Highly branched isoprenoid II ===
IPSO_{25}
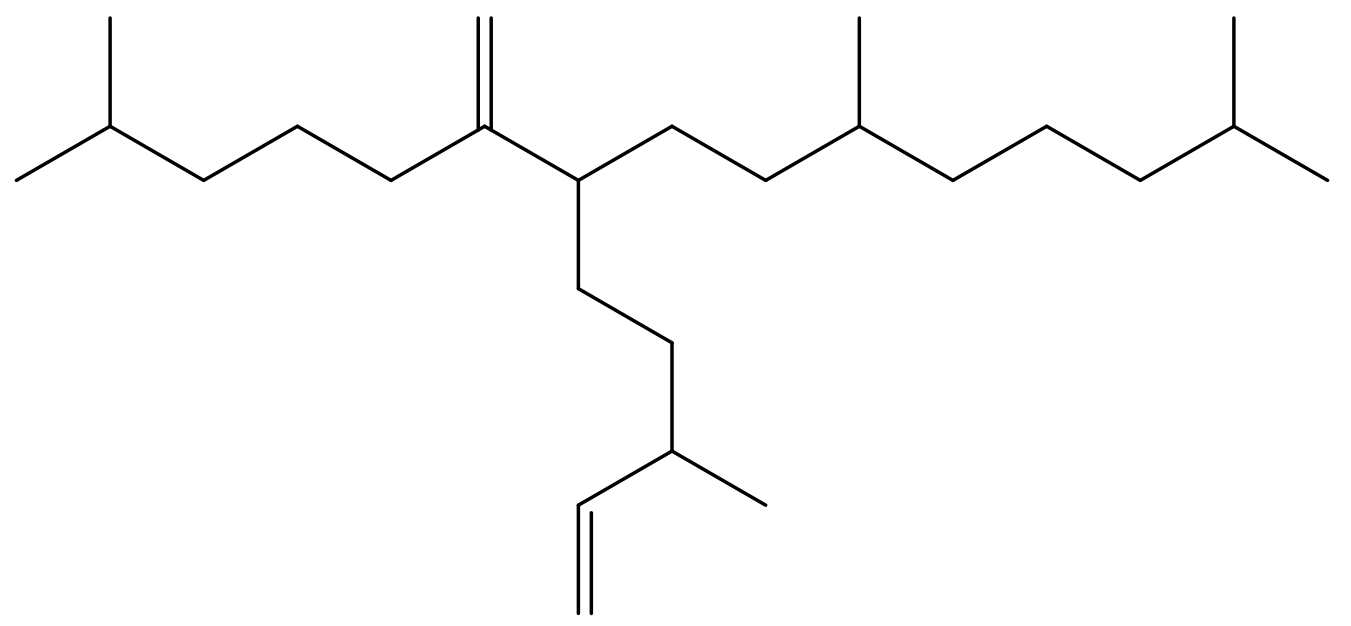

Names
- IUPAC name 2,10,14-trimethyl-6-methylidene-7-(3-methylpent-4-enyl)pentadecane

Identifiers
3D model (JSmol)	Interactive image
ChemSpider	24823125
PubChem CID	12067128
- InChI: InChI=1S/C25H48/c1-9-22(6)16-18-25(24(8)15-11-13-21(4)5)19-17-23(7)14-10-12-20(2)3/h9,20-23,25H,1,8,10-19H2,2-7H3 Key: RNCKFEUHFHLLAW-UHFFFAOYSA-N
- SMILES: CC(C)CCCC(C)CCC(CCC(C)C=C)C(=C)CCCC(C)C

Properties
Chemical formula	C_{25}H_{48}
Molar mass	348.659 g·mol^{−1}
- Except where otherwise noted, data are given for materials in their standard state (at 25 °C [77 °F], 100 kPa). Infobox references

Highly branched isoprenoid II (HBI II), a C_{25} diene, is also known as IPSO_{25} (ice proxy for the Southern Ocean with 25 carbon atoms). IPSO_{25} is a biomarker proxy for paleo ice in the Southern Ocean. IPSO_{25} has also been found to co-occur with IP_{25} in the Arctic. HBI II contains two double bonds and was first identified in marine diatoms by Simon Belt in 2016. The primary source of IPSO_{25} the sympagic diatom Berkeleya adeliensis, which lives within platelet ice. The IPSO_{25} proxy is a less-developed biomarker than IP_{25}, and its Arctic sources are unclear. IPSO_{25} has also been identified in the diatom Haslea ostrearia and in sediments in non-polar locations, indicating that more work is needed to fully understand and develop IPSO_{25} as a paleo ice proxy.

=== Highly branched isoprenoid III ===
HBI III
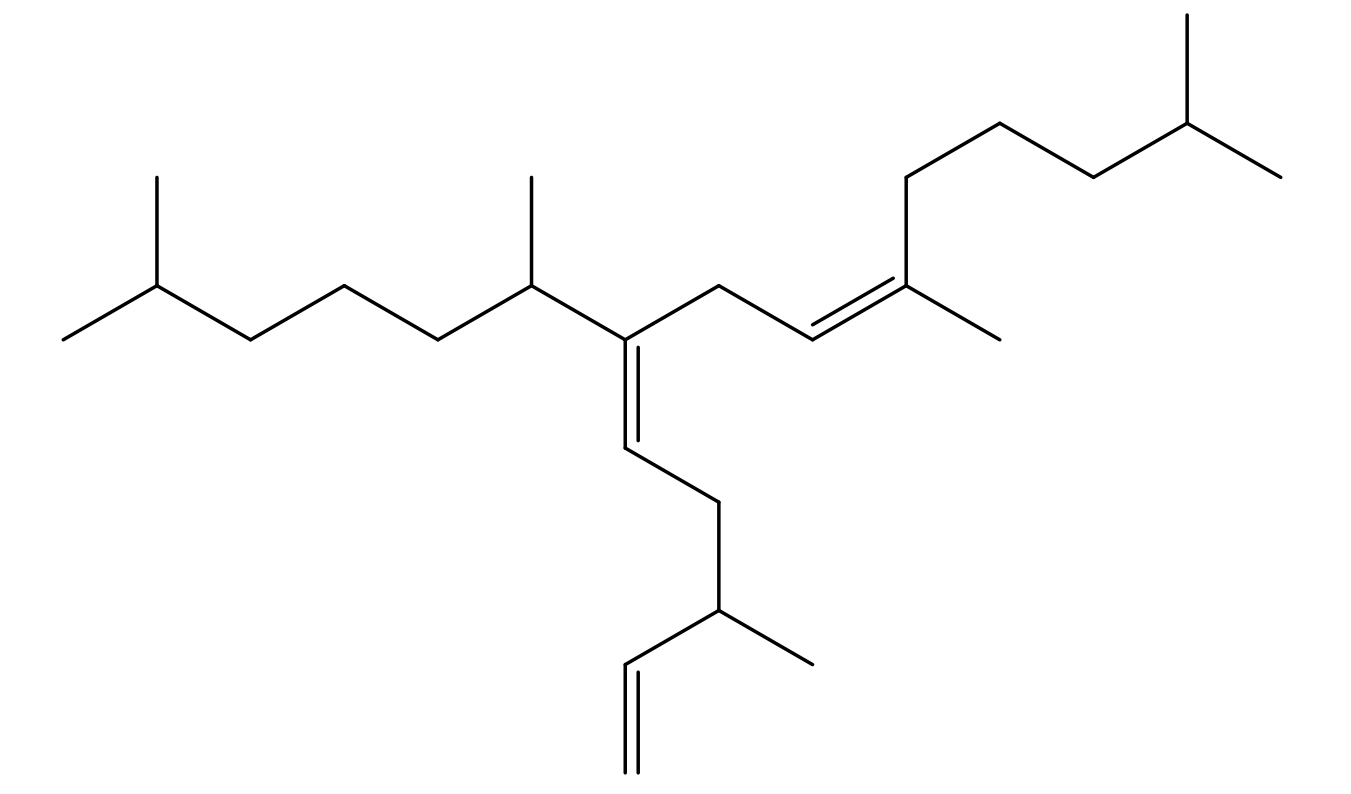

Names
- IUPAC name (Z,9E)-2,6,10,14-tetramethyl-9-(3-methylpent-4-enylidene)pentadec-6-ene

Identifiers
3D model (JSmol)	Interactive image
ChemSpider	4935862
PubChem CID	6430522
- InChI: InChI=1S/C25H46/c1-9-22(6)16-18-25(24(8)15-11-13-21(4)5)19-17-23(7)14-10-12-20(2)3/h9,17-18,20-22,24H,1,10-16,19H2,2-8H3/b23-17-,25-18+ Key: MRPCXANBZDEYCG-BRYXKCCLSA-N
- SMILES: CC(C)CCCC(C)/C(=C/CC(C)C=C)/C/C=C(/C)\CCCC(C)C

Properties
Chemical formula	C_{25}H_{46}
Molar mass	346.643 g·mol^{−1}
- Except where otherwise noted, data are given for materials in their standard state (at 25 °C [77 °F], 100 kPa). Infobox references

Highly branched isoprenoid III (HBI III), a C_{25} triene, is a biomarker useful for the analysis of the marginal ice zone (MIZ), a zone between the open ocean and sea ice. Highly branched isoprenoid III is primarily produced by pelagic algae of the genus Rhizosolenia, particularly Rhizsolenia setigera, Rhizosolenia herbetata f. semispina, and Rhizosolenia polydactyla. Its source was determined by Simon Belt in 2017, who isolated highly branched isoprenoid III from phytoplankton samples from western Svalbard and the South Atlantic. The production of highly branched isoprenoid III appears to be enhanced in the MIZ, however why this occurs is currently not well-understood. The absence of highly branched isoprenoid III in sediments is typically attributed to sea ice cover in the region, given that ice cover would not allow for pelagic algae production.

== Preservation ==
Many biomarkers possess functional groups or are unsaturated, causing them to undergo diagenesis when emplaced in sediments. Highly branched isoprenoids are observed to be well-preserved in the sedimentary record. Highly branched isoprenoids primarily form in the seasonal sea ice during the spring sympagic diatom blooms. When these ice sheets subsequently melt, the highly branched isoprenoids formed in the sea ice are released into the sea water. They then fall through the water column and are emplaced into the sediments, where they can be preserved. The sediment conditions impacts how well the highly branched isoprenoids are preserved. Generally, the stability of highly branched isoprenoids is dependent on their degree of unsaturation. C_{25} trienes are more likely to undergo degradation compared to C_{25} monenes and dienes, and degradation is enhanced by increasing temperature and exposure to light, which results in oxidation. The mono-unsaturated C_{25} IP_{25} is the least reactive highly branched isoprenoid, and thus is the most resistant to degradation and is best preserved in sediments.

Highly branched isoprenoids, particularly highly branched isoprenoid I, are hypothesized to have long-term stability. While most studies to date have focused on studying highly branched isoprenoids in sediments from the Holocene, highly branched isoprenoids have been detected, measured, and analyzed in 12 million year old sediments from the late Miocene. More work is necessary to determine whether highly branched isoprenoids can be preserved beyond 12 million years, but it is likely that their time to degradation is dependent on the local sediment conditions.

== Measurement techniques ==
=== GC/MS ===
Highly branched isoprenoids and other organic materials can be extracted from sediments for analysis. Coupled gas chromatography and mass spectrometry can be utilized to analyze the organic materials present in the sediments. Peaks can be identified using a gas chromatograph and a mass spectrum, which provide information about the retention time and mass-to-charge ratio of the organic compounds present in the molecule. This allows for the identification of highly branched isoprenoids within a material. To identify highly branched isoprenoids in sediments, typically selective ion monitoring (SIM) is utilized. SIM gathers data at masses of interest within an expected retention time window, enabling the identification and quantification of compounds with high sensitivity. Highly branched isoprenoid I, highly branched isoprenoid II, and highly branched isoprenoid III are identified and quantified via SIM using the characteristic mass spectrum peaks at m/z = 350, 348, and 346, respectively.

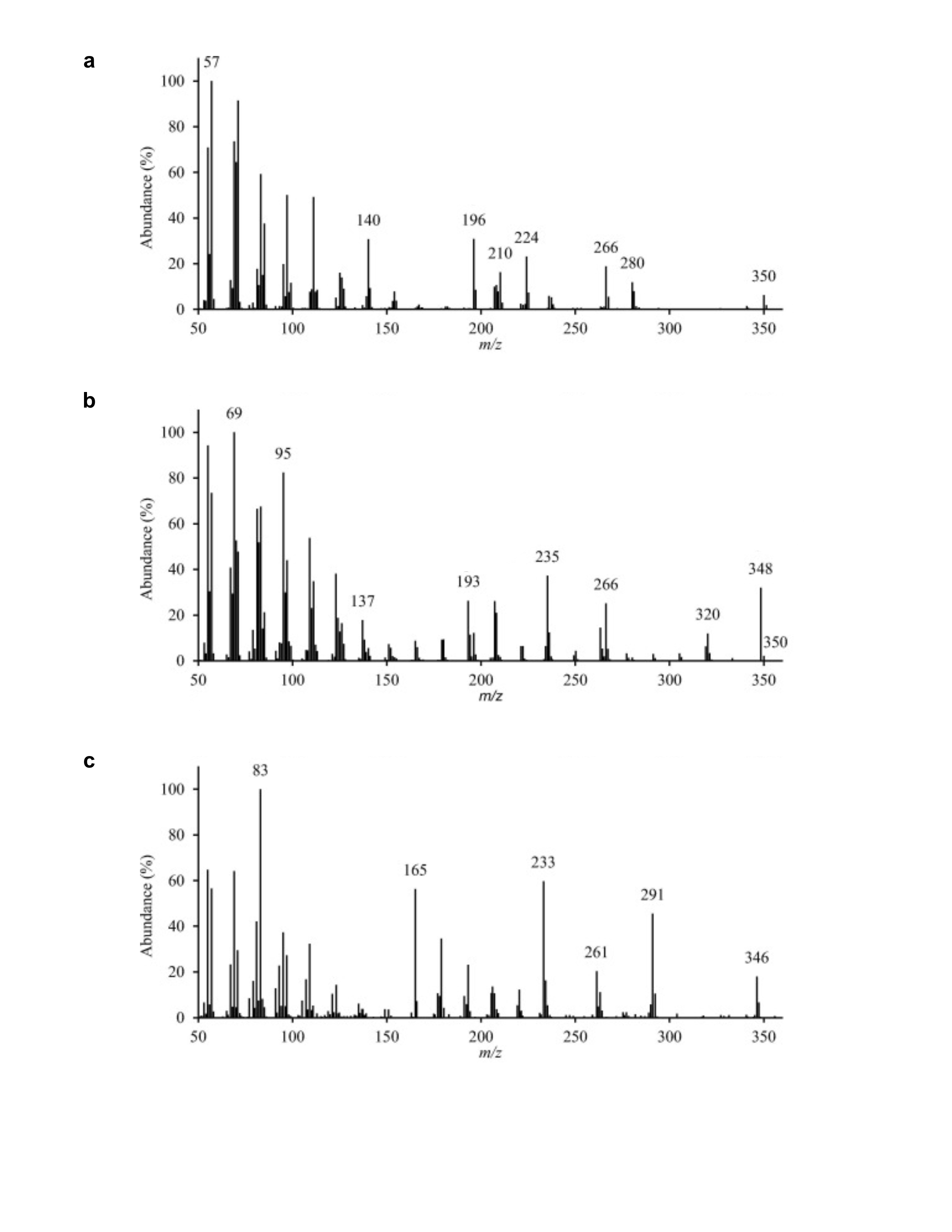
Example mass spectra for (a) Highly branched isoprenoid I (IP_{25}), (b) Highly branched isoprenoid II (IPSO_{25}), and (c) Highly branched isoprenoid III. Adapted from Belt, 2018.

=== Isotope ratios ===
Carbon isotopic measurements can be utilized to confirm the sea ice origin of highly branched isoprenoids. These carbon isotope measurements are obtained using an Isotope Ratio Mass Spectrometer. Highly branched isoprenoids with a sea ice origin are enriched in [[δ^{13}C]] in both sea ice and in sediments. The measurement of δ^{13}C values enables a diagnostic determination of whether the highly branched isoprenoid came from sea ice.

==== Highly branched isoprenoid I ====
Highly branched isoprenoid I has been observed to be enriched in ^{13}C. δ^{13}C values range from −16.9 to −22.7‰ in sea ice and −16.3 to −23.2‰ in sediments. This enrichment has been hypothesized to be in part a result of the fact that the marine diatoms that produce highly branched isoprenoid I live under CO_{2}-limited conditions. Temperature and diatom growth rate may also play a role in observed isotopic composition of highly branched isoprenoid I, but more work is needed to fully understand the drivers of the observed δ^{13}C values.

==== Highly branched isoprenoid II ====
Highly branched isoprenoid II has a characteristic carbon isotope composition, with measured δ^{13}C values ranging from −5.7 to −8.5‰. This value is indicative of an enrichment in ^{13}C. This enrichment has also been observed for highly branched isoprenoid II in sediments and in waters near melting sea ice. This enrichment likely results from the CO_{2}-limited conditions under which the diatom producers of highly branched isoprenoid II grow. This distinctive isotopic composition provides strong evidence for the sea ice origin of highly branched isoprenoid II, making it a good proxy for sea ice around Antarctica.

==== Highly branched isoprenoid III ====
Highly branched isoprenoid III is depleted in δ^{13}C, with values ranging from −35 to −40‰. Highly branched isoprenoid III is depleted in δ^{13}C because it is not produced under CO_{2}-limited conditions, so the depletion is a result of biological fractionation.

== Case study: Use of IP_{25} to reconstruct ice records ==
Currently, more than 60 paleo sea ice records that have been constructed based on IP_{25} over the Holocene, the Mid-Pleistocene Transition, the Pliocene/Pleistocene boundary, and the late Miocene. The presence of IP_{25} in sediments is a direct proxy for the presence of seasonal sea ice cover. One study utilized the concentration of IP_{25} in sediments to reconstruct sea-ice records in the western North Pacific and Bering Sea over the past 18,000 years. Researchers from Germany obtained sediment samples from the North Pacific Ocean and Bering Sea during a Sonne cruise in 2009. IP_{25} was identified in the samples using GC/MS, and the sediments were dated using a chronostratigraphic approach, X-ray fluorescence, and radiocarbon dating of planktonic foraminifera. The researchers found that variations in the concentration of the sea-ice proxy IP_{25} were consistent with known temperature variations based on other evidence, such as δ^{18}O values and biogenic opal data. Generally, during cold intervals, the concentration of IP_{25} in sediments was elevated, indicating more extensive sea ice cover. More specifically, between 18,000 and 15,000 years ago, IP_{25} concentrations were relatively high, but decreased between 14,700 and 12,900 years ago during the Bølling/Allerød warming period. At 12,500 years ago, a significant increase in IP_{25} concentration was detected in the sediments, consistent with the start of the Younger Dryas period, which marked a return to glacial conditions. IP_{25} concentrations decreased to approximately 0 11,500 years ago, marking the end of the Younger Dryas. For the entire Holocene, IP_{25} concentrations have remained low, which is accordant with the lack of extensive ice cover throughout this period. This reconstruction is consistent with other paleoclimate proxies and known climate variations, demonstrating the ability of the IP_{25} proxy to reconstruct paleo ice records.
