= Ice floe =

Large pack of floating ice

An ice floe (/floʊ/) is a segment of floating ice defined as a flat piece at least 20 metres (66 ft) across at its widest point, and up to more than 10 kilometres (6.2 miles) across. Drift ice is a floating field of sea ice composed of several ice floes. They may cause ice jams on freshwater rivers, and in the open ocean may damage the hulls of ships.

Ice floes pose significant dangers due to their instability, unpredictability, and susceptibility to environmental forces. Unlike thick, grounded ice, floes are buoyant and mobile, drifting with ocean currents and winds at variable speeds. This movement can rapidly separate a floe from the shoreline or from other floes, trapping individuals or wildlife with no means of return. Structurally, ice floes are often riddled with hidden fractures and varying thickness, making them prone to sudden breakage or collapse under weight. Additionally, temperature fluctuations can weaken their integrity, while tidal shifts and wave action can cause tilting or rolling, creating crushing forces or ejecting occupants into frigid, hypothermia-inducing waters. For vessels, ice floes present navigational hazards as collisions with even modest floes can damage hulls or jam propellers, especially in poorly reinforced ships.

One of the most dramatic historical examples of these dangers is the fate of the Endurance, the ship of Sir Ernest Shackleton's 1914–1917 Imperial Trans-Antarctic Expedition. Trapped by shifting pack ice in the Weddell Sea, Endurance was slowly crushed and ultimately sank in early 1915. Shackleton and his crew endured months stranded on sea ice before escaping via lifeboat to Elephant Island, and eventually, a near-miraculous voyage to South Georgia to organize rescue—without a single loss of life.

== Modelling ==
The modelling of sea-ice floes has received increasing attention in recent years, as floe size distribution influences heat and momentum fluxes in the marginal ice zone (MIZ). Most observations of sea-ice floe properties are obtained from satellite imagery, which allows the extraction of floe size distributions over large spatial scales. In addition to optical and radar satellite observations, floe characteristics can also be inferred from altimeter measurements.

== Gallery ==
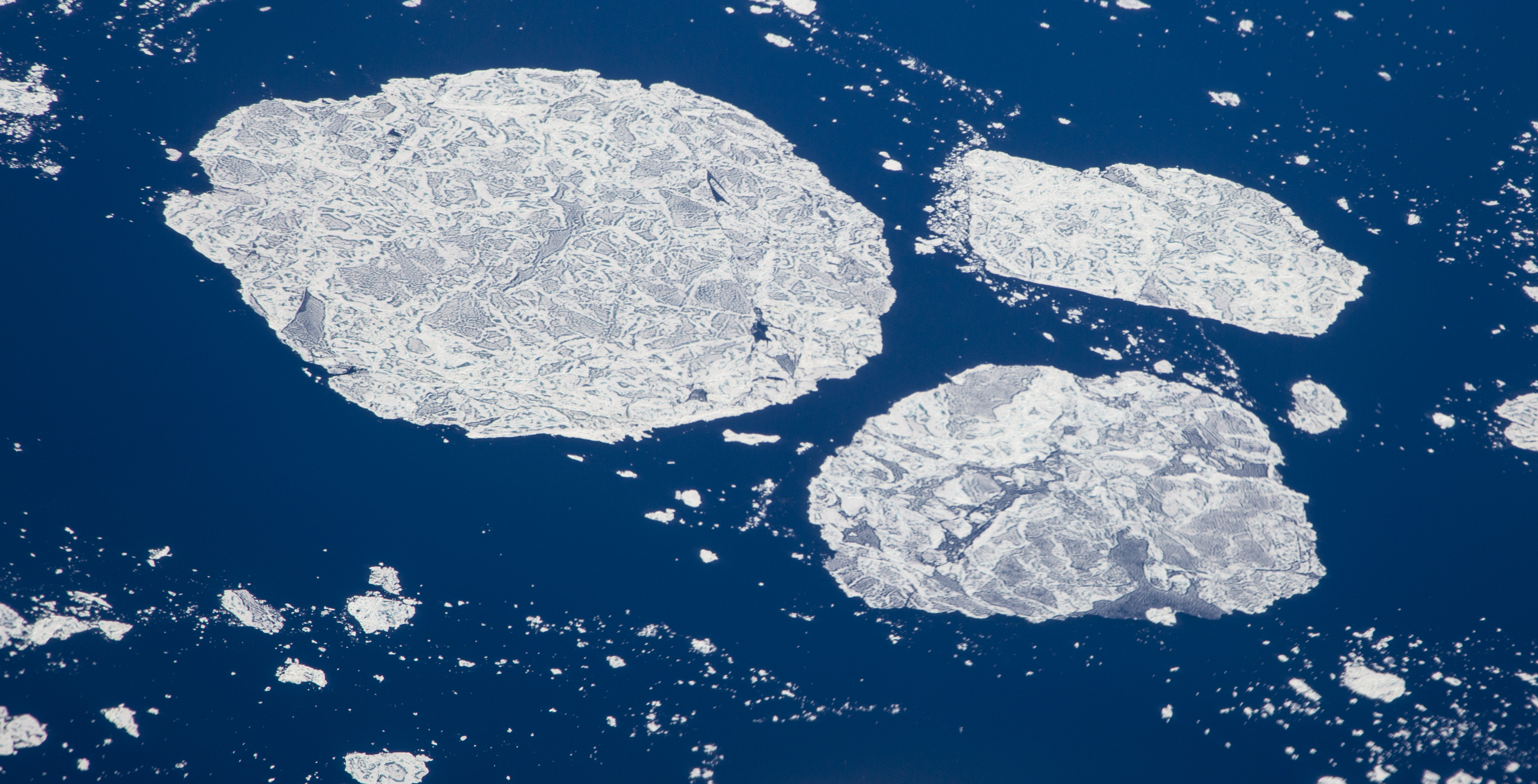
Several ice floes in the Hudson Strait

Ice floes in the Weddell Sea

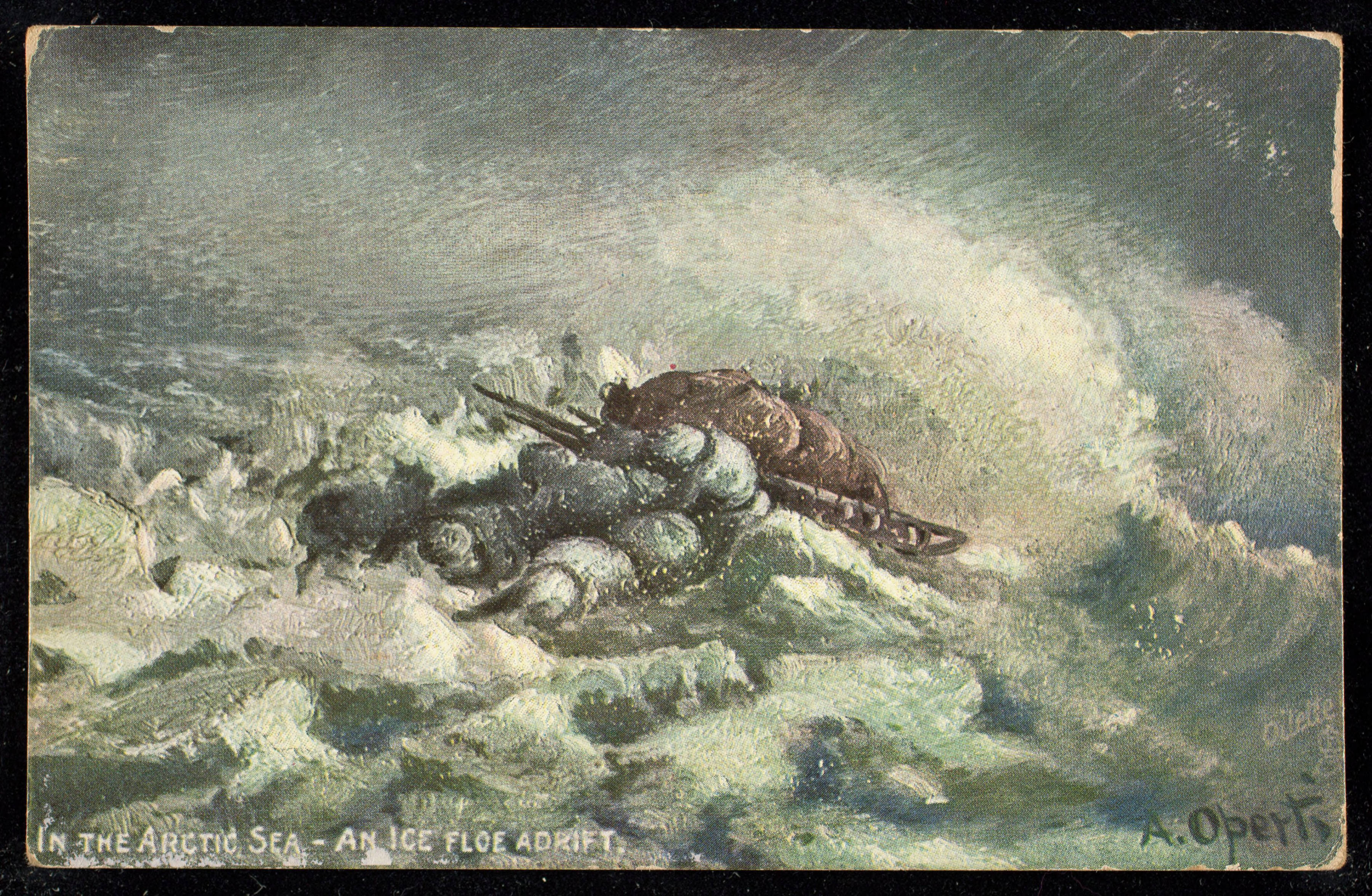
"In the Arctic Sea – An Ice Floe Adrift". Postcard, Albert Operti, early 20th century
