= Pacific white line =

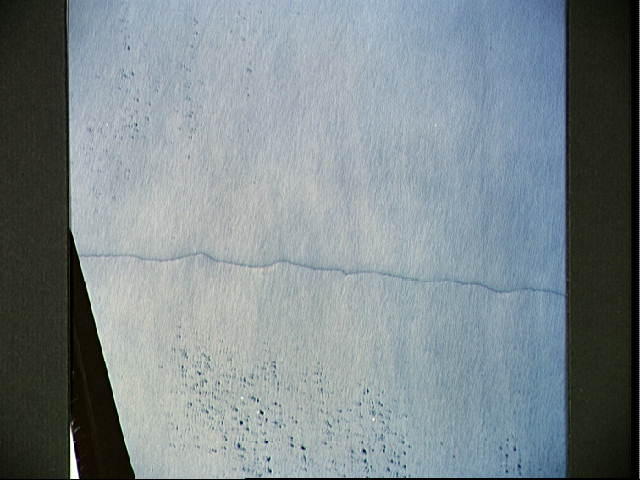
Photo taken by Astronaut from Space Shuttle Atlantis during STS-46 showing Pacific White Line

The Pacific White Line is a periodic but random natural feature in the Pacific Ocean. It is a huge collection of fish, foam and algae that usually occurs between January and August. When conditions are right it can be seen from space.

== Size ==
The line can clearly be seen from space when at its greatest, being around 2 kilometres (1.2 mi) wide and up to several hundred kilometres long. Although only covering 0.1% of the surface, it provides 50% of all the fish caught in the Pacific Ocean.

== Formation ==
The white line is formed because the currents bring fresh, cool and nutritious water loaded with minerals from the depths of the ocean to the surface. When this occurs, it moves west along the surface, with a 70-metre zone of cool water and a 40-metre zone of warm water, that has been subducted under the cold water leading to a lot of turbulence quite often. When these conditions are present tiny algae called Rhizosolenia, part of the diatom family, begin to flourish. No thicker than two or three times the width of a human hair, they pile up ahead of the line as it moves west. They breed once a day to form baby diatomettes and this creates a very localized food source, that all the fish are attracted to. The white color of the line is caused by the huge collection of diatoms, the cooler water and the whitecaps, formed by the turbulence in the water.

== Monitoring ==
Even since 1926, records of the white line and associated features have been taking place. In that year an unnamed ocean explorer described the white line and its collection of diatoms as having the consistency of soup due to the abundance of ocean fauna. In these early days scientists were able to discover the time at which the line formed (between January and August, as mentioned earlier).

During a 10-year international study called the Joint Global Ocean Flux Study the white line was photographed for the first time, as the scientists were studying how currents, chemicals, ocean color, and temperature affected the overall ocean and it was during this study that the line was photographed and the scale of the event was discovered, by the Space Shuttle.

Also, scientists have measured the concentrations of these diatoms by lasers in low flying aircraft, during normal conditions and during the time in which the white line is present, and it has been found that the concentrations of these algae is up to 100 times greater in the white line period.

== Collapse ==
These conditions are only rarely present and once one of the needed conditions fails, the Pacific returns to its normal state. Often, the line collapses because of the currents returning to normal and the cool waters return to the depths, causing the diatoms to die out (they need the difference in ocean temperature to flourish), the turbulence to cease and the fish to move elsewhere.
