= Marginal ice zone =

Transition zone between sea ice and the open ocean

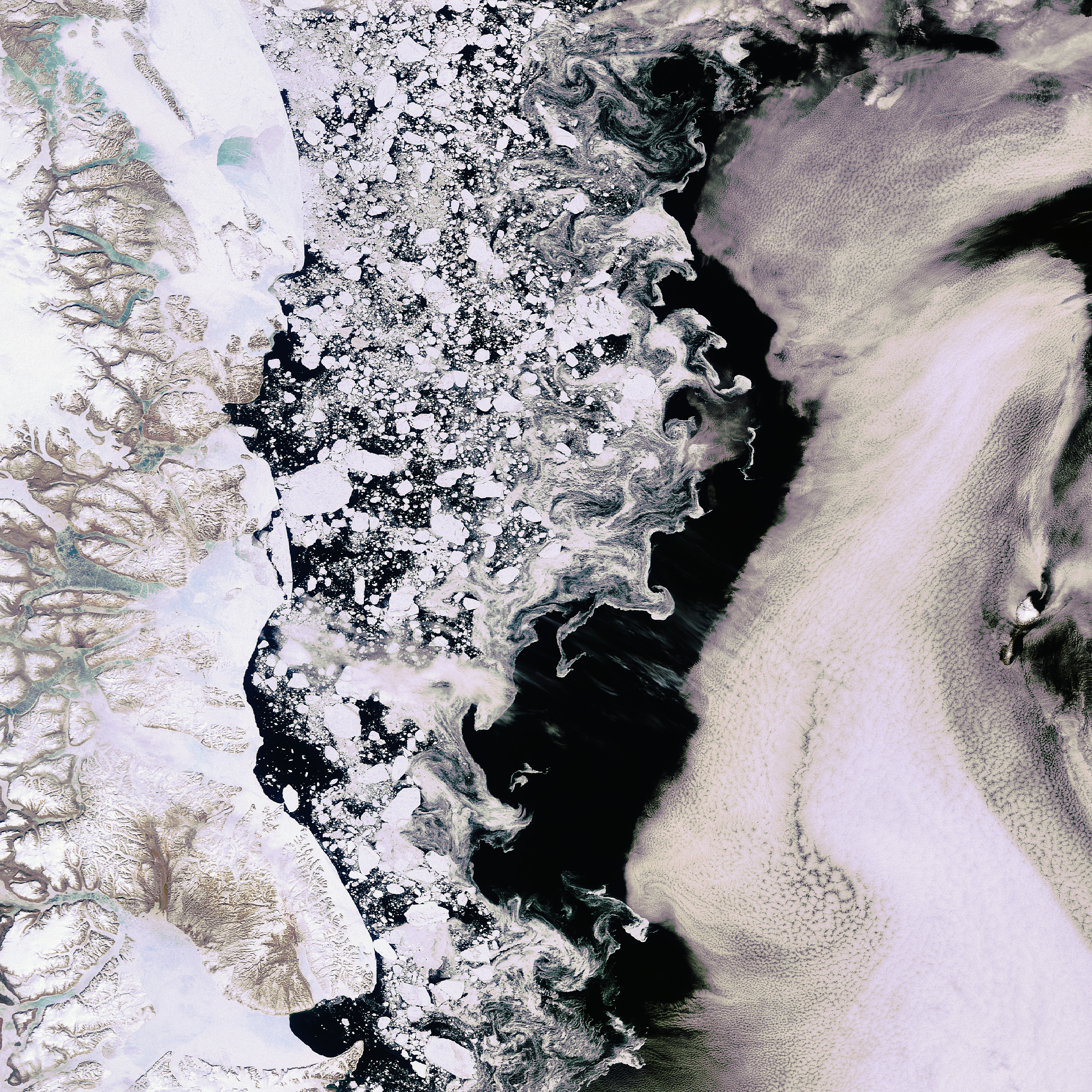
Satellite image of the marginal ice zone in the Greenland Sea, showing fragmented sea ice and ocean-driven surface patterns.

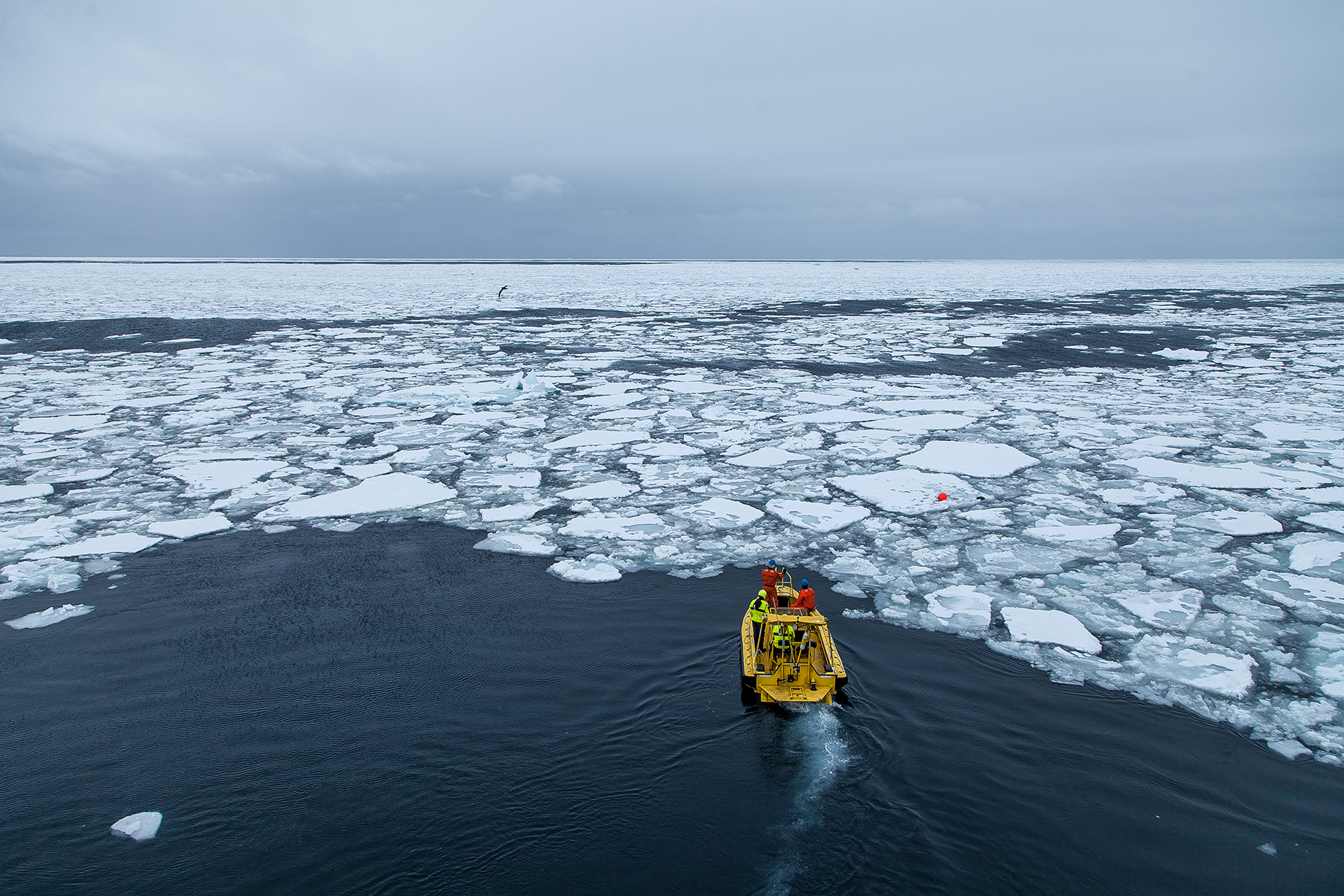
Fragmented first-year sea ice in the marginal ice zone southeast of Svalbard, with dispersed floes and open water indicative of wave–ice interaction, 5 May 2016.

The marginal ice zone (MIZ) is the transition region between the open ocean and the consolidated sea ice cover, located near the ice edge. It is commonly defined as the area between open water and dense pack ice, corresponding to sea ice concentrations of approximately 15% to 80%. Within this zone, the ice cover is fragmented and mobile, allowing waves and ocean swell to penetrate and interact with the ice. The marginal ice zone may be defined using different criteria, including sea ice concentration thresholds or the extent of wave–ice interactions. Marginal ice zones occur in both the Arctic and Antarctic regions.

== Physical characteristics ==
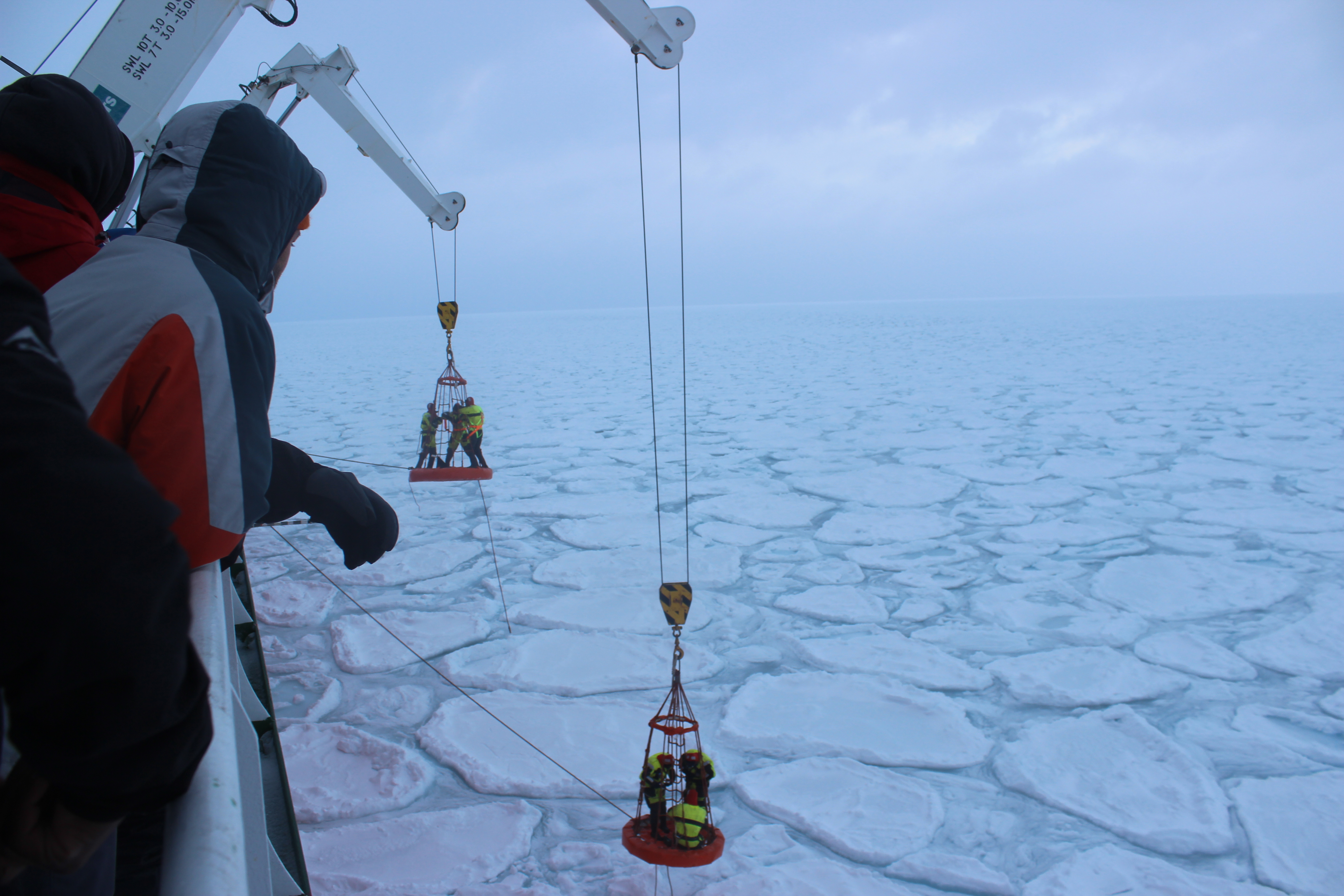
Scientists work putting trackers on the ice in the Marginal Ice Zone of Antarctica

The region is part of the seasonal ice zone and extends from the ice edge into the interior pack ice, where the ice is strongly affected by wave and swell processes. Its width can vary considerably, ranging from relatively narrow bands of about 15–80 km to broader regions of around 100–200 km, depending on environmental conditions such as wave activity and ice properties.

A defining characteristic of the MIZ is the interaction between ocean waves and sea ice. Waves and ocean swell penetrate the ice cover, breaking it into smaller ice floes and influencing its structure, motion, and melt. These processes distinguish the marginal ice zone from the more stable interior pack ice and play an important role in the polar climate system, influencing exchanges of heat, momentum, and mass between the ocean and atmosphere. Wave-driven fragmentation produces small ice pieces and surface patterns that reflect ocean currents and eddies.

== History of research ==
Scientific investigation of the marginal ice zone began to expand in the 1970s and 1980s, with a series of coordinated field experiments aimed at understanding wave–ice interactions and ice dynamics. Notable campaigns included the Marginal Ice Zone Experiment (MIZEX), the Norwegian Remote Sensing Experiment (NORSEX), and the Laboratory for Ice Mechanics Experiment (LIMEX). These studies established the importance of wave-induced ice breakup and helped define the marginal ice zone as a distinct physical regime within the sea ice cover.

Since the advent of satellite observations, research has increasingly focused on large-scale variability and long-term changes in the marginal ice zone, revealing significant seasonal and interannual variability as well as long-term trends linked to climate change.

== Ecology ==
The marginal ice zone is an ecologically important transition region between the open ocean and sea ice. Its significance lies not only in the ice itself, but in the highly productive ecosystems associated with it. Biological processes in the ice, water column, and seafloor are closely interconnected in this region. The MIZ is particularly important for marine life because it supports strong phytoplankton blooms, which can extend well beyond the ice edge. These blooms form the base of the food web, making the region an important feeding area for a wide range of species. Rapid changes in the marginal ice zone influence sea ice structure, primary productivity, and biogeochemical cycling, reflecting strong coupling between physical processes and marine ecosystem dynamics.

== Research and observations ==
The marginal ice zone remains challenging to represent in numerical models, and uncertainties in its dynamics contribute to errors in sea ice forecasts and climate projections. The extent and characteristics of the marginal ice zone have changed significantly during the satellite era, reflecting broader transformations in Arctic sea ice conditions. Observations also indicate pronounced seasonal trends, with the marginal ice zone widening in summer and narrowing in winter.

== See also ==
- Sea ice
- Ice floe
- Arctic Ocean
