= Outline of oceanography =

Hierarchical outline list of articles related to oceanography

The following outline is provided as an overview of and introduction to Oceanography.

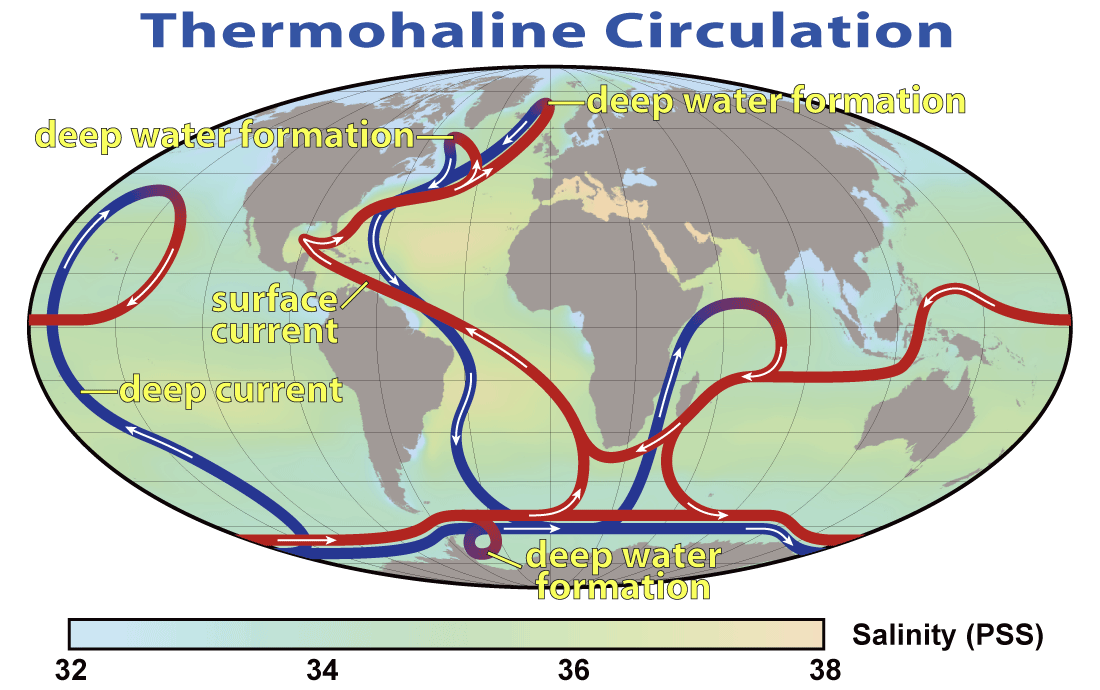
Thermohaline circulation.

Oceanography (from Ancient Greek ὠκεανός (ōkeanós) 'ocean' and γραφή (graphḗ) 'writing'), also known as oceanology, sea science, ocean science, and marine science, is the scientific study of the ocean, including its physics, chemistry, biology, and geology.

It is an Earth science, which covers a wide range of topics, including ocean currents, waves, and geophysical fluid dynamics; fluxes of various chemical substances and physical properties within the ocean and across its boundaries; ecosystem dynamics; and plate tectonics and seabed geology.

Oceanographers draw upon a wide range of disciplines to deepen their understanding of the world’s oceans, incorporating insights from astronomy, biology, chemistry, geography, geology, hydrology, meteorology and physics. (See: main article.)

Below is a structured list of topics on oceanography.

== What type of thing is oceanography? ==
Oceanography can be described as all of the following:

- The study of the physical and biological aspects of the ocean
- An academic discipline – branch of knowledge that is taught and researched at the college or university level. Disciplines are defined (in part), and recognized by the academic journals in which research is published, and the learned societies and academic departments or faculties to which their practitioners belong.
- A scientific field (a branch of science) – widely recognized category of specialized expertise within science, and typically embodies its own terminology and nomenclature. Such a field will usually be represented by one or more scientific journals, where peer-reviewed research is published. There are several geophysics-related scientific journals.
  - A natural science – one that seeks to elucidate the rules that govern the natural world using empirical and scientific methods.
    - A physical science – one that studies non-living systems.
      - An earth science – one that studies the planet Earth and its surroundings.
  - A biological science – one that studies the effect of organisms on their physical environment.

== Basic oceanography concepts, processes, theories and terminology ==
- Accretion (coastal management) – The process of coastal sediment returning to the visible portion of a beach
- Acoustic seabed classification – The partitioning of a seabed acoustic image into discrete physical entities or classes
- Acoustical oceanography – The use of underwater sound to study the sea, its boundaries and its contents
- Advection – The transport of a substance by bulk motion
- Ageostrophy – The real condition that works against geostrophic wind or geostrophic currents in the ocean, and works against an exact balance between the Coriolis force and the pressure gradient force
- Arakawa grids – Grid layouts in atmosphere and ocean models
- Astrooceanography – The study of oceans outside planet Earth
- Atlantic Equatorial mode – A quasiperiodic interannual climate pattern of the equatorial Atlantic Ocean
- Baroclinity – A measure of misalignment between the gradient of pressure and the gradient of density in a fluid
- Barotropic fluid – A fluid whose density is a function of pressure only
- Barrier layer (oceanography) – A layer of water separating the well-mixed surface layer from the thermocline
- Bathometer – An instrument for measuring water depth
- Bathymetry – The study of underwater depth of lake or ocean floors
- Benthic boundary layer – The layer of water directly above the sediment at the bottom of a river, lake or sea
- Beta plane – An approximation whereby the Coriolis parameter, ƒ, is set to vary linearly in space
- Biosphere – The global sum of all ecosystems on Earth
- Bioturbation – The reworking of soils and sediments by animals or plants
- Borders of the oceans – The limits of the Earth's oceanic waters
- Bottom water – The lowermost water mass in a water body
- Brunt–Väisälä frequency – The angular frequency at which a vertically displaced parcel will oscillate within a statically stable environment
- Cabbeling – When two separate water parcels mix to form a third which is denser and sinks below both constituents
- Carbonate compensation depth – Depth in the oceans below which no calcium carbonate sediment particles are preserved
- Chemocline – A cline caused by a strong, vertical chemistry gradient within a body of water
- Climate inertia – The widespread inherent characteristic of the climate to take a considerable time to respond to a changed input
- Cold core ring – A type of oceanic eddy, characterized as unstable, time-dependent swirling 'cells' that separate from their respective ocean current and move into water bodies with different characteristics
- Color of water – The variability of water colour with ambient conditions
- Conservative temperature – A thermodynamic property of seawater that represents the heat content
- Coriolis frequency – Frequency of inertial oscillation at the Earth's surface resulting from the Coriolis effect
- Cum sole – A Latin phrase meaning with the sun, sometimes used in meteorology and physical oceanography to refer to anticyclonic motion
- Currentology – A science that studies the internal movements of water masses
- Deep chlorophyll maximum – A subsurface maximum in the concentration of chlorophyll in the ocean or a lake.
- Deep sea community – Groups of organisms living deep below the sea surface sharing a habitat
- Deep-sea exploration – The investigation of conditions on the sea bed, for scientific or commercial purposes
- Density ratio – A measure of the relative contributions of temperature and salinity in determining the density gradient in a seawater column
- Dynamic topography – Elevation changes caused by the flow within the Earth's mantle
- Gas hydrate stability zone – A zone and depth of the marine environment at which methane clathrates naturally exist in the Earth's crust
- Ecosystem-based management – An environmental management approach that recognizes the full array of interactions within an ecosystem
- Ekman velocity – Wind induced part of the total horizontal velocity in the upper layer of water of the open ocean such that Coriolis force is balanced by wind force
- f-plane – An approximation whereby the Coriolis parameter ƒ is taken to be constant in space
- Ferromanganese nodules – The result of ion exchange reactions that precipitate ore components from the water (sedimentary) or out of the interstitial water of the sediments layers (diagenetic).
- Geostrophic balance – A balance between the pressure gradient force and the Coriolis force, which gives rise to geostrophic currents in the ocean and geostrophic winds in the atmosphere
- Hadley cell – A global scale tropical atmospheric circulation feature
- Halocline – Stratification of a body of water due to salinity differences
- Harmful algal bloom – Population explosion of organisms that can severely lower oxygen levels in natural waters, killing marine life
- High-nutrient, low-chlorophyll regions – Regions of the ocean where the abundance of phytoplankton is low and fairly constant despite the availability of macronutrients
- Hough function – The eigenfunctions of Laplace's tidal equations which govern fluid motion on a rotating sphere
- Hydrometeorology – A branch of meteorology and hydrology that studies the transfer of water and energy between the land surface and the lower atmosphere
- Isopycnal – A line connecting points of a specific density or potential density
- Kolk (vortex) – An underwater vortex created when rapidly rushing water passes an underwater obstacle in boundary areas of high shear.(landform)
- Langmuir circulation – A series of shallow, slow, counter-rotating vortices at the ocean's surface aligned with the wind
- Lithogenic silica – Silica that originates from terrestrial sources of rock and soil
- Longshore drift – Sediment moved by the longshore current
- Lower shoreface – The portion of the seafloor, and the sedimentary depositional environment, that lies below the everyday wave base
- Lunitidal interval – The time lag from the Moon passing overhead, to the next high or low tide.
- Lysocline – Depth in the ocean below which the rate of dissolution of calcite increases dramatically
- Marine clay – A type of clay found in coastal regions around the world
- Marine debris – Human-created solid waste in the sea or ocean
- Marine energy – Energy stored in the waters of oceans
- Marine outfall – A pipeline or tunnel that discharges municipal or industrial wastewater, stormwater, combined sewer overflows, cooling water, or brine effluents from water desalination plants to the sea
- Marine pollution –
- Marine protected area – Protected areas of seas, oceans, estuaries or large lakes
- Marine sediment – Deposits of insoluble particles that have accumulated on the seafloor.
- Marine spatial planning – A process that brings together multiple users of the ocean – including energy, industry, government, conservation and recreation – to make informed and coordinated decisions about how to use marine resources sustainably.
- Marine technology – Technologies used in marine environments
- Maritime Continent – The region of Southeast Asia which comprises, amongst other countries, Indonesia, Philippines and Papua New Guinea
- Maritime geography –
- Mean High Water – The average of all the high water heights observed over a period of several years
- Mean high water spring – Average level of the spring high tides over a fairly long period of time
- Mean low water spring – Average level of the spring low tides over a fairly long period of time
- Metasilicic acid – The hypothetical chemical compound with formula H_{2}SiO_{3}
- Metocean – The syllabic abbreviation of meteorology and (physical) oceanography.
- Microturbulence – Turbulence that varies over small distance scales
- Military meteorology – Meteorology applied to military purposes
- Mixed layer – A layer in which active turbulence has homogenized some range of depths.
- Mixing length model – A method to describe momentum transfer by turbulence Reynolds stresses within a Newtonian fluid boundary layer by means of an eddy viscosity
- Mode water – A type of water mass which is nearly vertically homogeneous
- Nepheloid layer – A layer of water in the deep ocean basin, above the ocean floor, that contains significant amounts of suspended sediment
- Neritic zone – The relatively shallow part of the ocean above the drop-off of the continental shelf
- Neutral density – A density variable used in oceanography
- New production – Marine biological processes using nutrients from outside the euphotic zone
- Ocean – A body of saline water that composes much of a planet's hydrosphere
- Ocean bank – A part of the sea which is shallow compared to its surrounding area
- Ocean color – Explanation of the colour of oceans and ocean colour radiometry
- Ocean Data Standards –
- Ocean dredging – A technique for ocean bottom sampling
- Ocean exploration – A part of oceanography describing the exploration of ocean surfaces
- Ocean heat content – Thermal energy stored in ocean water
- Ocean observations – List of currently feasible essential observations for climate research
- Ocean surface topography – The shape of the ocean surface relative to the geoid
- Ocean turbidity – A measure of the amount of cloudiness or haziness in sea water caused by individual particles that are too small to be seen without magnification
- Ocean zoning – A policy approach for environmental resource management in oceanic environments (political)
- Oceanic physical-biological process – Hydrodynamic and hydrostatic effects on marine organisms
- Ophiolite – Uplifted and exposed oceanic crust
- Orthosilicic acid – Chemical compound assumed present in dilute solutions of silicon dioxide in water
- Phycosphere – A microscale mucus region that is rich in organic matter surrounding a phytoplankton cell
- Pierson–Moskowitz spectrum – An empirical relationship that defines the distribution of energy with frequency within the ocean
- Pockmark (geology) – Craters in the seabed caused by gas and liquids erupting and streaming through the sediments
- Potential temperature – The temperature that a fluid would attain if adiabatically brought to a standard reference pressure
- Potential vorticity – A simplified approach for understanding fluid motions in a rotating system
- Pycnocline – Layer where the density gradient is greatest within a body of water
- Region of freshwater influence – Regions where rivers debouch into estuaries and coastal shelf seas where the currents patterns are governed by density differences between salt sea water and fresh river water
- Rossby radius of deformation – The length scale at which rotational effects become as important as buoyancy or gravity wave effects in the evolution of the flow about some disturbance
- Salt fingering – A mixing process that occurs when relatively warm, salty water overlies relatively colder, fresher water
- Satellite surface salinity – Measurements of surface salinity made by remote sensing satellites
- Sea – A large body of salt water surrounded in whole or in part by land
- Sea air – Air at or by the sea
- Sea spray – Aerosol particles that are formed directly from the ocean
- Sea surface microlayer – The boundary layer where all exchange occurs between the atmosphere and the ocean
- Sea surface temperature – Water temperature close to the ocean's surface
- Seafloor massive sulfide deposits – Mineralised deposits from subsea hydrothermal vents
- Secondary circulation – A circulation induced in a rotating system
- Sediment Profile Imagery – A technique for photographing the interface between the seabed and the overlying water
- Sediment–water interface – The boundary between bed sediment and the overlying water column
- Shoal – A natural landform that rises from the bed of a body of water to near the surface and is covered by unconsolidated material
- Shore lead – A waterway opening between pack ice and shore
- Shutdown of thermohaline circulation – An effect of global warming on a major ocean circulation.
- Sigma coordinate system – A coordinate system used in computational models for oceanography, meteorology and other fields where fluid dynamics are relevant
- Significant wave height – The mean wave height of the highest third of the waves
- Siliceous ooze – A siliceous pelagic sediment that covers large areas of the deep ocean floor
- Sound (nautical) – The process of determining depth of water beneath a ship or in a tank
- Southwest Approaches – The offshore waters to the southwest of Great Britain (geographical)
- Spice (oceanography) – Spatial variations in the temperature and salinity of seawater whose effects on density cancel each other
- Spindrift – The spray foam blown from cresting waves
- Spring bloom – A strong increase in phytoplankton abundance that typically occurs in the early spring
- Submarine earthquake – An earthquake that occurs under a body of water, especially an ocean
- Submarine groundwater discharge – Flow of groundwater into the sea below sea level
- Submarine landslide – Landslides that transport sediment across the continental shelf and into the deep ocean
- Submersion (coastal management) – Sustainable cyclic portion of coastal erosion where coastal sediments move from the visible portion of a beach to the submerged nearshore region, and later return to the original visible portion of the beach
- Surface layer – The layer of a turbulent fluid most affected by interaction with a solid surface or the surface separating a gas and a liquid where the characteristics of the turbulence depend on distance from the interface
- Target strength – A measure of the reflection coefficient of a sonar target
- Taylor column – A fluid dynamics phenomenon that occurs as a result of the Coriolis effect
- Taylor–Goldstein equation – An ordinary differential equation used in the field of fluid dynamics
- Telepresence technology – The combination of satellite technology with the Internet to broadcast information, including video in real-time
- Thermocline – A distinct layer in a large body of fluid in which temperature changes more rapidly with depth than it does in the layers above or below
- Thermostad – A homogeneous layer of oceanic waters in terms of temperature, it is defined as a relative minimum of the vertical temperature gradient
- Turbidite – The geologic deposit of a turbidity current
- Underwater – The aquatic or submarine environment
- Upper shoreface – The portion of the seafloor that is shallow enough to be agitated by everyday wave action
- Volcanic impacts on the oceans – Effects of volcanic eruptions on the marine ecosystems and climate
- Water column – A conceptual column of water from the surface to the bottom of a body of water
- Water mass – Identifiable body of water with a common formation history which has physical properties distinct from surrounding water
- Wind stress – The shear stress exerted by the wind on the surface of large bodies of water

== Branches of oceanography ==
- Biological oceanography – The study of how organisms affect and are affected by the physics, chemistry, and geology of the oceanographic system
  - Outline of biological oceanography
  - Biogeography – The study of the distribution of species and ecosystems in geographic space and through geological time
- Chemical oceanography – The study of ocean chemistry
- Geological oceanography represented by Marine geology – The study of the history and structure of the ocean floor
  - Outline of marine geology – Hierarchical outline list of articles related to marine geology
  - Geophysical fluid dynamics – The fluid dynamics of naturally occurring flows, such as lava flows, oceans, and planetary atmospheres, on Earth and other planets
- Paleoceanography – The study of the history of the oceans in the geologic past
- Physical oceanography – The study of physical conditions and physical processes within the ocean
  - Outline of physical oceanography – Hierarchical outline list of articles related to physical oceanography
  - Coastal morphodynamics – The study of the interaction of seafloor topography and fluid hydrodynamic processes involving the motion of sediment

=== Related sciences ===
- Earth science – The fields of natural science relating to the planet Earth
  - Outline of Earth sciences – Hierarchical outline list of articles related to the Earth sciences
  - Portal:Earth sciences – Wikipedia's portal for exploring content related to the Earth sciences
- Ecology – Scientific study of the relationships between living organisms and their environment
  - Outline of ecology – Hierarchical outline list of articles related to ecology
  - Portal:Ecology – Wikipedia's portal for exploring content related to ecology
- Geography – The science that studies the terrestrial surface, the societies that inhabit it and the territories, landscapes, places or regions that form it
  - Outline of geography – Hierarchical outline list of articles related to geography
  - Portal:Geography – Wikipedia's portal for exploring content related to geography
- Geology – The study of the composition, structure, physical properties, and history of Earth's components, and the processes by which they are shaped.
  - Outline of geology – Hierarchical outline list of articles related to geology
- Hydrography – Applied science of measurement and description of physical features of bodies of water
  - Outline of hydrography – Hierarchical outline list of articles related to hydrography
- Marine biology – The scientific study of organisms that live in the ocean
  - Outline of marine biology – Hierarchical outline list of articles related to marine biology
  - Portal:Marine life – Wikipedia's portal for exploring content related to marine life
- Palaeontology – Scientific study of prehistoric life
  - Outline of palaeontology – Hierarchical outline list of articles related to palaeontology
  - Portal:Palaeontology – Wikipedia's portal for exploring content related to palaeontology

=== Related technology ===
- Fishing industry – The economic sector concerned with taking, culturing, processing, preserving, storing, transporting, marketing or selling fish or fish products
- Navigation – The process of monitoring and controlling the movement of a craft or vehicle from one place to another
- Offshore drilling – Mechanical process where a wellbore is drilled below the seabed
- Remotely operated underwater vehicle – Tethered underwater mobile device operated by a remote crew
- Underwater diving – Descending below the surface of the water to interact with the environment
  - Outline of underwater diving – Hierarchical outline list of articles related to underwater diving
  - Portal:Underwater diving – Wikipedia's portal for exploring content related to underwater diving

== Biological oceanography ==
Biological oceanography – The study of how organisms affect and are affected by the physics, chemistry, and geology of the oceanographic system

- Algae scrubber – A biological water filter which uses light to grow algae which removes undesirable chemicals from the water
- Algal bloom – Rapid increase or accumulation in the population of planktonic algae
- Apparent oxygen utilisation – The difference between oxygen gas solubility and the measured oxygen concentration in water with the same physical and chemical properties
- Artificial seawater – A mixture of dissolved mineral salts (and sometimes vitamins) that simulates seawater
- Bacterioplankton – The bacterial component of the plankton that drifts in the water column
- Bacterioplankton counting methods – Methods for the estimation of the abundance of bacterioplankton in a specific body of water
- Biological pump – The ocean's biologically driven sequestration of carbon from the atmosphere to deep sea water and sediment
- Biomineralization – The process by which living organisms produce minerals
- Bioturbation – The reworking of soils and sediments by animals or plants
- Blue carbon – The carbon captured by the world's oceans and coastal ecosystems
- Brown algae – A large group of multicellular algae, comprising the class Phaeophyceae
- Continental shelf pump – Hypothetical mechanism transporting carbon from shallow continental shelf waters to the adjacent deep ocean
- Critical depth – A hypothesized surface mixing depth at which phytoplankton growth is precisely matched by losses of phytoplankton biomass within this depth interval
- Deep chlorophyll maximum – A subsurface maximum in the concentration of chlorophyll in the ocean or a lake.
- Diatom – A class of microalgae, found in the oceans, waterways and soils of the world
- Diel vertical migration – A pattern of daily vertical movement characteristic of many aquatic species
- Eustigmatophyte – A small group of algae with marine, freshwater and soil-living species
- F-ratio – In oceanic biogeochemistry, the fraction of total primary production fuelled by nitrate
- Fish reproduction – The reproductive physiology of fishes
- Gelatinous zooplankton – Fragile and often translucent animals that live in the water column
- Heterotrophic picoplankton – The fraction of plankton composed by cells between 0.2 and 2 μm that do not perform photosynthesis
- Ichthyoplankton – The eggs and larvae of fish that drift in the water column
- Joint Global Ocean Flux Study – An international research programme on the fluxes of carbon between the atmosphere and ocean, and within the ocean interior
- List of eukaryotic picoplankton species – List of eukaryotic species which have one of their cell dimensions smaller than 3 μm
- List of marine ecoregions – As defined by the WWF and The Nature Conservancy
- Marine biogeochemical cycles – Biogeochemical cycles that occur within marine environments
- Marine biology – The scientific study of organisms that live in the ocean
- Marine botany – The study of aquatic plants and algae that live in seawater of the open ocean and the littoral zone, along shorelines of the intertidal zone, and in brackish water of estuaries.
- Marine ecosystem – Any ecosystems in the marine environment
- Marine habitats – A habitat that supports marine life
- Marine life – The plants, animals and other organisms that live in the salt water of the sea or ocean, or the brackish water of coastal estuaries
- Marine microorganisms – Any life form too small for the naked human eye to see that lives in a marine environment
- Microalgae – Microscopic algae, typically found in freshwater and marine systems, living in both the water column and sediment
- Milky seas effect – A luminous phenomenon in the ocean in which large areas of seawater appear to glow brightly enough at night to be seen by satellites orbiting Earth
- Minimum depth of occurrence – The shallowest depth in the ocean at which a species is observed
- Mycoplankton – Fungal members of the plankton communities of aquatic ecosystems
- Ocean acidification in the Great Barrier Reef – The eggs and larvae of fish that drift in the water column
- Photosynthetic picoplankton –
- Phytoplankton – Autotrophic members of the plankton ecosystem
- Picobiliphyte – A group of eukaryotic algae which are among the smallest members of photosynthetic picoplankton.
- Picoeukaryote – Picoplanktonic eukaryotic organisms 3.0 μm or less in size
- Picoplankton – The fraction of plankton composed by cells between 0.2 and 2 μm that can be prokaryotic or eukaryotic and phototrophs or heterotrophs
- Plankton – Organisms that live in the water column and are incapable of swimming against a current
- Polar seas – A collective term for the Arctic Ocean and the southern part of the Southern Ocean
- Productivity (ecology) – The rate of generation of biomass in an ecosystem
- Project Kaisei – Project to study and clean up the Great Pacific Garbage Patch
- Pseudoplankton – Organisms that cannot float, but attach themselves to planktonic organisms or other floating objects
- Raphidophyte – A class of aquatic algae
- Red tide – A common name for a worldwide phenomenon known as an algal bloom
- Sea snot – A collection of mucus-like organic matter found in the sea
- Seston – The organisms and non-living matter swimming or floating in a water body
- Thin layers (oceanography) – Congregations of phytoplankton and zooplankton in the water column only a few tens of centimeters in vertical thickness
- Whale feces – The excrement of whales and its role in the ecology of the oceans

=== Marine realms ===
Marine realm – Top-level grouping of marine ecoregions

- Arctic realm – Group of marine ecoregions in the Arctic zone
- Central Indo-Pacific – A biogeographic region of the Earth's seas, comprising the tropical waters of the western Pacific Ocean, the eastern Indian Ocean, and the connecting seas.
- Indo-Pacific – A biogeographic region of the Earth's seas, comprising the tropical waters of the western Pacific Ocean, the eastern Indian Ocean, and the connecting seas.
- Southern Ocean – The ocean around Antarctica
- Temperate Northern Pacific – A biogeographic region of the Earth's seas, comprising the temperate waters of the northern Pacific Ocean.
- Tropical Atlantic – Marine realm covering both sides of the Atlantic between the temperate realms
- Tropical Eastern Pacific – Marine realm covering both sides of the Atlantic between the temperate realms
- Western Indo-Pacific – A biogeographic region of the Earth's seas, comprising the tropical waters of the eastern and central Indian Ocean.

=== Marine ecoregions ===
Marine ecoregions – Ecological regions of the oceans and seas identified and defined based on biogeographic characteristics

- List of marine ecoregions – As defined by the WWF and The Nature Conservancy
- Agulhas Current – The western boundary current of the southwest Indian Ocean that flows down the east coast of Africa
- Andaman Sea – Marginal sea of the eastern Indian Ocean
- Arabian Sea – A marginal sea of the northern Indian Ocean between the Arabian Peninsula and India
- Benguela Current – The broad, northward flowing ocean current that forms the eastern portion of the South Atlantic Ocean gyre
- Bering Sea – Marginal sea of the Pacific Ocean off the coast of Alaska, Eastern Russia and the Aleutian Islands
- Canary Current – A wind-driven surface current that is part of the North Atlantic Gyre
- Chesapeake Bay – An estuary in the U.S. states of Maryland and Virginia
- Cocos Island – An island designated as a National Park off the shore of Costa Rica
- Coral Triangle – A roughly triangular area of the tropical marine waters of Indonesia, Malaysia, Papua New Guinea, Philippines, Solomon Islands and Timor-Leste
- Grand Banks of Newfoundland – A group of underwater plateaus south-east of Newfoundland on the North American continental shelf.
- Great Barrier Reef – Coral reef system off the east coast of Australia, World Heritage Site
- Hawkins Bank – A large, submerged bank off the Mascarene Plateau in the Indian Ocean
- Hudson Complex – A marine ecoregion in Canada, part of the Arctic marine realm
- Humboldt Current – A cold, low-salinity eastern boundary current that flows north along the western coast of South America from southern Chile to northern Peru
- Integrated Marine and Coastal Regionalisation of Australia – A biogeographic regionalisation of the oceanic waters of Australia's Exclusive Economic Zone
- Marine ecoregions of the South African exclusive economic zone – Geographical regions of similar ecological characteristics
- Mediterranean Sea – Sea connected to the Atlantic Ocean between Europe, Africa and Asia
- Mesoamerican Barrier Reef System – A marine region from Isla Contoy at the tip of the Yucatán Peninsula down to Belize, Guatemala and the Bay Islands of Honduras
- Moliço – Submerged aquatic vegetation collected for use in agriculture
- New Caledonian barrier reef – Barrier reef in the South Pacific
- Panama Bight – A marine ecoregion on the Pacific coast of the Americas
- Red Sea – Arm of the Indian Ocean between Arabia and Africa
- Ryukyu Islands – A chain of Japanese islands that stretch southwest from Kyushu to Taiwan
- Saya de Malha Bank – Submerged bank in Mauritius
- Sea ice microbial communities – Groups of microorganisms living within and at the interfaces of sea ice
- Sea of Okhotsk – A marginal sea of the western Pacific Ocean, between the Kamchatka Peninsula, the Kuril Islands, the island of Hokkaido, the island of Sakhalin, and eastern Siberian coast
- Solomon Archipelago – A marine ecoregion of the Pacific Ocean
- Somali Current – An ocean boundary current that flows along the coast of Somalia and Oman in the Western Indian Ocean
- Southeast Asian coral reefs – Marine ecosystem
- Southern California Bight – The curved coastline of Southern California from Point Conception to San Diego
- St. Crispin's Reef – An elongate outer-shelf coral reef in the Great Barrier Reef, Queensland, Australia
- Yellow Sea – Sea in Northeast Asia between China and Korea

==== Mangrove ecoregions ====
List of mangrove ecoregions – List ordered according to region

- Mangrove – A shrub or small tree that grows in coastal saline or brackish water
- Mangrove swamp – Saline woodland or shrubland habitat formed by mangrove trees
- Ecological values of mangroves –
- Mangrove tree distribution – Global distribution of mangroves
- Australian mangroves – Distribution of Australian mangroves
- Bahia mangroves – A tropical ecoregion of the Mangrove forests Biome, and the South American Atlantic Forest biome, located in Northeastern Brazil
- Bakhawan Eco-Park – A mangrove forest located in Kalibo, Aklan, Philippines
- Belizean Coast mangroves – Ecoregion in the mangrove biome along the coast of Belize and Amatique Bay in Guatemala
- Bhitarkanika Mangroves – A mangrove wetland in India's Odisha state, in the river delta of the Brahmani and Baitarani rivers
- Bongsanglay Natural Park – A protected area of mangrove forests and swamps on Ticao Island in the Bicol Region of the Philippines
- Myanmar Coast mangroves – An ecoregion in Burma, Malaysia, and Thailand where there were once thick forests of mangroves
- Caroni Swamp – The second largest mangrove wetland in Trinidad and Tobago
- Central African mangroves – The largest area of mangrove swamp in Africa, located on the coasts of West Africa, mainly in Nigeria
- East African mangroves – An ecoregion of mangrove swamps along the Indian Ocean coast of East Africa in Mozambique, Tanzania, Kenya and southern Somalia
- Esmeraldas–Pacific Colombia mangroves – An ecoregion of mangrove forests along the Pacific coast of Colombia and Ecuador.
- Florida mangroves – An ecoregion along the coasts of the Florida peninsula, and the Florida Keys
- Godavari–Krishna mangroves – A mangrove ecoregion of India's eastern coast
- Greater Antilles mangroves – Mangrove forests on the coast of Cuba
- Guianan mangroves – A coastal ecoregion of southeastern Venezuela, Guyana, Suriname and French Guiana
- Guinean mangroves – A coastal ecoregion of mangrove swamps in rivers and estuaries near the ocean of West Africa from Senegal to Sierra Leone
- Gulf of Guayaquil–Tumbes mangroves – An ecoregion in the Gulf of Guayaquil in South America, in northern Peru and southern Ecuador
- Gulf of Panama mangroves – An ecoregion along the Pacific coast of Panama and Colombia
- Indochina mangroves – A large mangrove ecoregion on the coasts of Thailand, Cambodia, Vietnam and Malaysia in Southeast Asia
- Indus River Delta–Arabian Sea mangroves – A large mangrove ecoregion on the Arabian Sea coast of Sindh Province, Pakistan
- Jiwani Coastal Wetland – A wetland located in Balochistan, Pakistan, near the town of Jiwani
- Laguna de Términos – The largest and one of biologically the richest tidal lagoons located entirely on the Gulf Coast of Mexico
- Madagascar mangroves – A coastal ecoregion in the mangrove forest biome found on the west coast of Madagascar
- Manabí mangroves – An ecoregion along the Pacific coast of Ecuador
- Maranhão mangroves – A mangrove ecoregion of northern Brazil
- Marismas Nacionales–San Blas mangroves – A mangrove ecoregion of the Pacific coast of Mexico
- Mosquitia–Nicaraguan Caribbean Coast mangroves – An ecoregion, in the Mangrove biome, along the Caribbean coasts of Nicaragua, Honduras, Costa Rica and off shore islands
- Nariva Swamp – A freshwater wetland in Trinidad and Tobago
- New Guinea mangroves – A freshwater wetland in Trinidad and Tobago
- Niger Delta mangroves – A mangrove forest within a deltaic depositional environment
- Northern Honduras mangroves – An ecoregion in the mangroves biome, along most of the Caribbean coast of Honduras, up to the east of Amatique Bay in Guatemala
- Sarovaram Bio Park – Project with an eco-friendly theme and in an ecosystem of wetlands and mangrove forests containing bird habitats
- South American Pacific mangroves – An ecoregion along the Pacific coast of Panama, Colombia, Ecuador and Peru
- Southern Africa mangroves – An ecoregion of mangrove swamps in rivers and estuaries on the eastern coast of South Africa
- Sunda Shelf mangroves – An ecoregion of mangrove swamps in rivers and estuaries on the eastern coast of South Africa
- Sundarbans – The world's largest coastal mangrove forest in the delta region of Padma, Meghna and Brahmaputra river basins in the Bay of Bengal
- Tropical salt pond ecosystem – A buffer zone between terrestrial and marine ecosystems
- United States Virgin Islands mangroves – Wetlands on the coast of the US Virgin Islands

== Chemical oceanography ==
Chemical oceanography – The study of ocean chemistry

- Alkalinity – The capacity of water to resist changes in pH that would make the water more acidic
- Anoxic event – Intervals in the Earth's past where parts of oceans were depleted of oxygen at depth over a large geographic area
- Anoxic waters – Areas of sea water, fresh water, or groundwater that are depleted of dissolved oxygen
- Artificial seawater – A mixture of dissolved mineral salts (and sometimes vitamins) that simulates seawater
- Biogeochemistry – The study of chemical cycles of the earth that are either driven by or influence biological activity
- Biological pump – The ocean's biologically driven sequestration of carbon from the atmosphere to deep sea water and sediment
- Bjerrum plot – A graph of the concentrations of the different species of a polyprotic acid in a solution, as functions of the solution's pH, when the solution is at equilibrium
- Blue carbon – The carbon captured by the world's oceans and coastal ecosystems
- Brine rejection – Process by which salts are expelled from freezing water
- Carbon cycle – Biogeochemical cycle by which carbon is exchanged among the biosphere, pedosphere, geosphere, hydrosphere, and atmosphere,
- Carbon cycle re-balancing – A name for a group of environmental policies
- Carbonaceous biochemical oxygen demand – A test measured by the depletion of dissolved oxygen by biological organisms in a body of water
- Chemical oxygen demand – Measure of the amount of oxygen that can be consumed by reactions in a solution
- Climate change – Change in the statistical distribution of weather patterns for an extended period
- Cold blob (North Atlantic) – A cold temperature anomaly of ocean surface waters, affecting the Atlantic Meridional Overturning Circulation
- Colored dissolved organic matter – The optically measurable component of the dissolved organic matter in water
- Continental shelf pump – Hypothetical mechanism transporting carbon from surface waters to the adjacent deep ocean.
- Cyclic salt – Salt carried by the wind from breaking waves and deposited on land
- Dead zone (ecology) – Hypoxic areas in oceans and large lakes caused by excessive nutrient pollution
- Euxinia – Condition when water is both anoxic and sulfidic
- F-ratio – In oceanic biogeochemistry, the fraction of total primary production fuelled by nitrate
- Gaia hypothesis –
- Global Ocean Data Analysis Project – A synthesis project bringing together oceanographic data
- Hydrogen isotope biogeochemistry –
- Hypoxia (environmental) – Low environmental oxygen levels
- Hypoxia in fish – Response of fish to environmental hypoxia
- Ocean acidification in the Great Barrier Reef –
- Jelly-falls – Marine carbon cycling events whereby gelatinous zooplankton sink to the seafloor
- Marine snow – Shower of mostly organic detritus falling from the upper layers of the water column
- New production – Marine biological processes using nutrients from outside the euphotic zone
- Nutrient – Substance that an organism uses to live
- Ocean acidification – The ongoing decrease in the pH of the Earth's oceans, caused by the uptake of carbon dioxide
- Ocean chemistry – The chemistry of marine environments
- Oceanic carbon cycle – Processes that exchange carbon between various pools within the ocean and the atmosphere, Earth interior, and the seafloor
- Oligosaprobe – Organisms that inhabit clean water or water that is only slightly polluted by organic matter.
- Silicon isotope biogeochemistry –
- Oxygen cycle – The biogeochemical cycle of oxygen within its four main reservoirs: the atmosphere, the biosphere, the hydrosphere, and the lithosphere
- Oxygen minimum zone – The zone in which oxygen saturation in seawater in the ocean is at its lowest
- Paleosalinity – The salinity of the global ocean or of an ocean basin at a point in geological history.
- Productivity (ecology) – The rate of generation of biomass in an ecosystem
- Redox gradient –
- Remineralisation –
- Salinity – The proportion of salt dissolved in a body of water
- Sea foam – Foam created by the agitation of seawater
- Sea salt – Salt produced from the evaporation of seawater
- Sea salt aerosol – Natural aerosol deriving from sea spray
- Seawater – Water from a sea or ocean
- Sel gris – A coarse granular sea salt evaporite
- Solubility pump – A physico-chemical process that transports dissolved inorganic carbon from the ocean's surface to its interior
- Submarine groundwater discharge –
- Thermohaline circulation – A part of the large-scale ocean circulation that is driven by global density gradients created by surface heat and freshwater fluxes
- Total boron – The sum of boron species in a solution
- Total carbon – The sum of carbon species in a solution
  - Total organic carbon – The sum of organic carbon species in a solution
    - Dissolved organic carbon – The fraction of dissolved organic carbon in a solution
    - Particulate organic carbon – The fraction of particulate organic carbon in a solution
  - Total inorganic carbon – The sum of inorganic carbon species in a solution
    - Dissolved inorganic carbon – The fraction of dissolved inorganic carbon in a solution
    - Particulate inorganic carbon – The fraction of particulate inorganic carbon in a solution
- Water mass – Identifiable body of water with a common formation history which has physical properties distinct from surrounding water
  - Antarctic bottom water – A cold, dense, water mass originating in the Southern Ocean surrounding Antarctica
  - Antarctic Intermediate Water – A cold, relatively low salinity water mass found mostly at intermediate depths in the Southern Ocean
  - Circumpolar deep water – The water mass in the Pacific and Indian oceans formed by mixing of other water masses in the region
  - North Atlantic Deep Water – A deep water mass formed in the North Atlantic Ocean
  - North Pacific Intermediate Water – A cold, moderately low salinity water mass that originates between the Kuroshio and Oyashio waters just east of Japan
  - Overturning in the Subpolar North Atlantic Program – An international project to study the link between water mass transformation at high latitudes and the meridional overturning circulation in the North Atlantic
  - Subantarctic Mode Water – A water mass formed near the Subantarctic Front on the northern flank of the Antarctic Circumpolar Current
  - Temperature–salinity diagram – Diagrams used to identify water masses
  - Weddell Sea Bottom Water – A subset of Antarctic Bottom Water mass that is at -0.7 °C or colder

== Equipment, instrumentation and technologies ==
- ABISMO – A Japanese remotely operated underwater vehicle for deep sea exploration
- Acoustic Doppler current profiler – A hydroacoustic current meter used to measure water current velocities over a depth range using the Doppler effect
- Acoustic release – An oceanographic device for the deployment and subsequent recovery of instrumentation from the sea floor, in which the recovery is triggered remotely by an acoustic command signal
- Acoustically Navigated Geological Underwater Survey – A deep-towed still-camera sled operated by the Woods Hole Oceanographic Institute in the early 1970s
- Aquarius (SAC-D instrument) – NASA instrument aboard the Argentine SAC-D spacecraft
- Aquarius Reef Base – An underwater habitat off Key Largo in the Florida Keys National Marine Sanctuary
- Argo (ROV) – Unmanned deep-towed undersea video camera sled
- DSV Alvin – A manned deep-ocean research submersible owned by the United States Navy and operated by the Woods Hole Oceanographic Institution
- Bathythermograph – Device that holds a temperature sensor and a transducer to detect changes in water temperature versus depth
- Benthic lander – Autonomous observational platforms that sit on the seabed to record physical, chemical or biological activity
- Bottom crawler – An underwater exploration and recovery vehicle that moves about on the bottom with wheels or tracks
- Box corer – A marine geological sampling tool for soft sediments
- Cabled observatory – Seabed oceanographic research platforms connected to the surface by undersea cables
- Coastal zone color scanner – A multi-channel scanning radiometer aboard the Nimbus 7 satellite, predominately designed for water remote sensing
- CTD (instrument) – An oceanography instrument used to measure the conductivity, temperature, and pressure of seawater
- Current meter – A device for measuring the flow in a water current
- Deep-ocean Assessment and Reporting of Tsunamis – A component of an enhanced tsunami warning system
- Deepsea Challenger – Deep-diving submersible designed to reach the bottom of Challenger Deep
- Drifter (floating device) – An oceanographic instrument package floating freely on the surface to investigate ocean currents and other parameters like temperature or salinity
- Echo sounding – Measuring the depth of water by transmitting sound waves into water and timing the return
- Ekman current meter – A mechanical flowmeter invented by Vagn Walfrid Ekman, a Swedish oceanographer, in 1903
- Ekman water bottle – A sea water temperature sample device
- Epibenthic sled – An instrument designed to collect benthic and benthopelagic faunas from the deep sea
- Fixed-point ocean observatory – An autonomous system of automatic sensors and samplers that continuously gathers data from deep sea, water column and lower atmosphere, and transmits the data to shore in real or near real-time
- Float (oceanographic instrument platform) – An oceanographic instrument platform used for making subsurface measurements in the ocean
- Flow tracer – Any fluid property used to track flow
- Forel-Ule scale – A method to approximately determine the color of bodies of water using a standard colour scale
- Friendly Floatees – Plastic bath toys made famous by the work of Curtis Ebbesmeyer, an oceanographer who models ocean currents on the basis of flotsam movements.
- GLORIA sidescan sonar – Geological Long Range Inclined Asdic for determining the topography of the ocean floor
- Hansa Carrier – Container ship which lost a cargo of identifiable shoes which were used to record ocean drift
- High capacity oceanographic lithium battery pack – A type of battery pack used by oceanographers
- Kaikō ROV – A Japanese remotely operated underwater vehicle for deep sea exploration
- LEBU – A device to reduce noise around a towed acoustic array
- Long baseline acoustic positioning system – Class of underwater acoustic positioning systems used to track underwater vehicles and divers
- Manta trawl – A net system for sampling the surface of the ocean
- Marine optical buoy – Instrumentation that measures light at and very near the sea surface in a specific location over a long period of time
- Message in a bottle – A form of communication in which a written message sealed in a container is released into the conveyance medium
- Mooring – A collection of devices, connected to a wire and anchored on the sea floor
- Multibeam echosounder – A type of sonar that is used to map the seabed
- Nansen bottle – Device for obtaining samples of seawater at a specific depth
- Ocean data acquisition system – A set of instruments deployed at sea to collect as much meteorological and oceanographic data as possible.
- PERISCOP – A pressurized recovery device designed for retrieving deep-sea marine life
- Prediction and Research Moored Array in the Atlantic – A system of moored observation buoys in the tropical Atlantic Ocean which collect meteorological and oceanographic data
- RAFOS float – Submersible device used to map ocean currents well below the surface
- Regional Scale Nodes – An electro-optically cabled underwater observatory that directly connects to the global Internet
- Research Moored Array for African-Asian-Australian Monsoon Analysis and Prediction – A system of moored observation buoys in the Indian Ocean that collects meteorological and oceanographic data
- Rotor current meter – A mechanical current meter used in oceanography to measure flow
- Science On a Sphere – A spherical projection system created by NOAA which presents high-resolution video on a suspended globe
- SeaWiFS – A satellite-borne sensor designed to collect global ocean biological data
- Secchi disk – A circular disk used to measure water transparency or turbidity
- Sediment trap – Instrument used in oceanography to measure the quantity of sinking particulate material
- Short baseline acoustic positioning system – A class of underwater acoustic positioning systems used to track underwater vehicles and divers
- Sofar bomb – A long-range position-fixing system that uses explosive sounds in the deep sound channel of the ocean to enable pinpointing of the location of ships or crashed planes
- SOSUS – A chain of underwater listening posts
- Tide gauge – A device for measuring the change in sea level relative to a datum
- Underwater acoustic positioning system – A system for the tracking and navigation of underwater vehicles or divers by using acoustic distance and/or direction measurements, and subsequent position triangulation
- Underwater glider – A type of autonomous underwater vehicle that uses small changes in its buoyancy to move up and down and uses wings to convert the vertical motion to horizontal, propelling itself forward with very low power consumption
- Unmanned surface vehicle – Vehicle that operates on the surface of the water without a crew
- Van Veen grab sampler – An instrument to sample sediment in water environments
- Vector measuring current meter – An instrument used for measuring horizontal velocity in the upper ocean
- Water remote sensing – System to measure the color of water by observing the spectrum of radiation leaving the water.
- Weather buoy – Floating instrument package which collects weather and ocean data on the world's oceans
- Young grab – An instrument to sample sediment in the ocean

=== Research vessels ===
Research vessel – A ship or boat designed, modified, or equipped to carry out research at sea

- RRS Charles Darwin – A Royal Research Ship belonging to the British Natural Environment Research Council. Since 2006, she has been the geophysical survey vessel, RV Ocean Researcher
- RRS Sir David Attenborough
- RRS Discovery (2012) – A Royal Research Ship operated by the Natural Environment Research Council
- RRS Ernest Shackleton
- RRS James Cook – A British Royal Research Ship operated by the Natural Environment Research Council
- RRS John Biscoe (1956) – A supply and research vessel used by the British Antarctic Survey between 1956 and 1991
- NOAAS Murre II – An American research vessel in commission in the National Oceanic and Atmospheric Administration (NOAA) fleet from 1970 to 1989
- NOAAS Okeanos Explorer – An exploratory vessel for the National Oceanic and Atmospheric Administration
- MS Polarfront – A Norwegian weather ship located in the North Atlantic
- USS Rehoboth (AVP-50) – An oceanographic survey ship from 1948 to 1970
- USNS Robert D. Conrad (T-AGOR-3) – Oceanographic research ship that served the U.S. Navy from 1962 to 1989
- RV Song of the Whale – A research vessel owned by Marine Conservation Research International
- RV Noosfera – A supply and research ship operated by the National Antarctic Scientific Center of Ukraine

=== Satellites ===
- GEOS-3 – The third and final satellite of NASA's Geodetic Earth Orbiting Satellite/Geodynamics Experimental Ocean Satellite program
- Jason-1 – Satellite oceanography mission
- Jason-2 (Ocean Surface Topography Mission) – International Earth observation satellite mission
- Jason-3 – International Earth observation satellite mission
- Oceansat-1 – The first Indian satellite built specifically for Ocean applications
- Oceansat-2 – An Indian satellite to provide service continuity for users of the Ocean Colour Monitor instrument on Oceansat-1
- QuikSCAT – An Earth observation satellite carrying the SeaWinds scatterometer to measure the surface wind speed and direction over the ice-free global oceans

=== Technologies ===
- Free Ocean CO_{2} Enrichment –
- Integrated multi-trophic aquaculture – Aquaculture which provides the byproducts, including waste, from one aquatic species as inputs for another
- Ocean acoustic tomography – A technique used to measure temperatures and currents over large regions of the ocean
- Ocean thermal energy conversion – Use of temperature difference between surface and deep water to run a heat engine
- Ocean reanalysis – A method of combining historical ocean observations with a general ocean model to reconstruct a historical state of the ocean
- Offshore geotechnical engineering – A sub-field of engineering concerned with human-made structures in the sea
- Submarine pipeline – A pipeline that is laid on the seabed or below it inside a trench
- Subsea production system – Wells located on the seabed
- Underwater diving – Descending below the surface of the water to interact with the environment
- Vacuum-anchor – Ocean bottom fasteners used to anchor deepwater oil platforms
- Vienna Standard Mean Ocean Water – A standard defining the isotopic composition of fresh water originating from ocean water
- Water quality modelling – The prediction of water pollution using mathematical simulation techniques

== Geological oceanography ==
(Outline of Marine geology – Hierarchical outline list of articles on marine geology)

Marine geology – The study of the history and structure of the ocean floor

- Abyssal channel – Channels in the sea floor formed by fast-flowing turbidity currents
- Accretionary complex – A former accretionary wedge
- Accretionary wedge – The sediments accreted onto the non-subducting tectonic plate at a convergent plate boundary
- Aragonite sea – Chemical conditions of the sea favouring aragonite deposition
- Astoria Fan – A submarine fan radiating asymmetrically southward from the mouth of the Astoria Canyon
- Back-arc basin – Submarine features associated with island arcs and subduction zones
- Blake Plateau – A wide shelf, deeper than the continental shelf, in the western Atlantic Ocean off the southeastern United States
- Blue hole – Marine cavern or sinkhole, open to the surface, in carbonate bedrock
  - Dean's Blue Hole – A deep water-filled sinkhole in the Bahamas
  - Dragon Hole – Deep underwater sinkhole in the South China Sea
- Calcite sea – Sea chemistry favouring low-magnesium calcite as the inorganic calcium carbonate precipitate
- Carbonate platform – A sedimentary body with topographic relief composed of autochthonous calcareous deposits
- Cascadia Channel – An extensive deep-sea channel of the Pacific Ocean.
- Chukchi Sea Shelf – The westernmost part of the continental shelf of North America and the easternmost part of the continental shelf of Asia.
- Cold seep – Ocean floor area where hydrogen sulfide, methane and other hydrocarbon-rich fluid seepage occurs
- Forearc – The region between an oceanic trench and the associated volcanic arc
- Fundus (seabed) – The seabed in a tidal river below low water mark
- Hawaiian Trough – A moat-like depression of the seafloor surrounding the Hawaiian Islands
- Hope Basin – A geological feature of the Chukchi Sea Shelf off Alaska
- Intra-arc basin – A sedimentary basin within a volcanic arc
- Juan de Fuca Channel – A submarine channel off the shore of Washington state
- List of submarine topographical features – Oceanic landforms and topographic elements.
- Marine geology of the Cape Peninsula and False Bay – Subtidal geological formations in the vicinity of Cape Town
- Paleoceanography – The study of the history of the oceans in the geologic past
- Pelagic red clay – Slow accumulating oceanic sediment with low biogenic constituents
- Pelagic sediment – Fine-grained sediment that accumulates on the floor of the open ocean
- Porcupine Seabight – A deep-water oceanic basin on the continental margin of the northeastern Atlantic
- Rio Grande Rise – An aseismic ocean ridge in the southern Atlantic Ocean off the coast of Brazil
- Sapropel – Dark-coloured sediments that are rich in organic matter
- Terrigenous sediment – Sediments derived from the erosion of rocks on land

=== Fracture zones ===
fracture zone – A junction between oceanic crustal regions of different ages on the same plate left by a transform fault

- List of fracture zones – List of seabed zones where divergent plates have had transform faults
- Blanco fracture zone – A right lateral transform fault zone between the Gorda Ridge and the Juan de Fuca Ridge in the northwest Pacific
- Charlie–Gibbs fracture zone – a system of two parallel fracture zones interrupting the Mid-Atlantic Ridge between the Azores and Iceland
- Chile fracture zone – A major strike slip fault and fracture zone on the Antarctic—Nazca plate boundary
- Clipperton fracture zone – A fracture zone of the Pacific Ocean seabed
- Diamantina fracture zone – An escarpment, separating two oceanic plateaus in the southeast Indian Ocean
- Easter fracture zone – An oceanic fracture zone associated with the transform fault from the Tuamotu archipelago to the Peru–Chile Trench
- Fifteen-Twenty fracture zone – A fracture zone on the Mid-Atlantic Ridge at the migrating triple junction between the North American, South American, and Nubian plates
- Mendocino fracture zone – A fracture zone and transform boundary off the coast of Cape Mendocino in far northern California
- Mocha fracture zone – A fracture zone on the Nazca plate off the coast of Mocha Island,
- Owen fracture zone – A transform fault in the northwest Indian Ocean between the Arabian and African plates from the Indian plate
- Panama fracture zone – A right lateral-moving transform fault and fracture zone between the Cocos plate and the Nazca plate
- Romanche Trench – A trench in the Atlantic formed by the Romanche fracture zone on the Mid-Atlantic Ridge
- Shackleton fracture zone – An undersea fracture zone and fault in the Drake Passage between the Scotia and Antarctic plates
- Sovanco fracture zone – A right lateral-moving transform fault and fracture zone offshore of Vancouver Island in Canada
- Valdivia fracture zone – A transform fault zone off the coast of southern Chile
- Vema fracture zone – A fracture zone in the equatorial Atlantic Ocean. It offsets the Mid-Atlantic Ridge by 320 km to the left.

=== Geology of the North Sea ===
Geology of the North Sea – Description of the current geological features and the geological history that created them

- Doggerland – A land mass now beneath the southern North Sea that connected Great Britain to continental Europe
- Eridanos (geology) – A river that flowed where the Baltic Sea is now
- Geology of the southern North Sea –
- Haisborough Group – A Triassic lithostratigraphic group beneath the southern part of the North Sea
- Heron Group – A Triassic alluvial lithostratigraphic group beneath the central and northern North Sea
- Lower North Sea Group – A group of geologic formations in the subsurface of the Netherlands and adjacent parts of the North Sea.
- North German basin – A passive-active rift basin in central and west Europe
- Norwegian continental shelf – Norwegian administrative area, rich in petroleum and gas
- Strandflat – A landform typical of the Norwegian coast consisting of a flattish erosion surface on the coast and near-coast seabed
- Utsira High – A basement high and horst in the southwest of the Norwegian continental shelf

=== New Zealand seafloor ===
New Zealand seafloor – The topography and geography of the seafloor in New Zealand's territorial waters.

- 2012 Kermadec Islands eruption – A major undersea volcanic eruption in the Kermadec Islands of New Zealand
- Bollons Seamount – A continental fragment seamount southeast of New Zealand
- Bounty Trough – A depression in the submerged eastern part of Zealandia
- Brothers Volcano – A submarine volcano in the Kermadec Arc, north east of New Zealand
- Campbell Plateau – A large oceanic plateau south of New Zealand and the Chatham Rise
- Challenger Plateau – A large submarine plateau west of New Zealand and south of the Lord Howe Rise
- Chatham Rise – An area of ocean floor to the east of New Zealand, forming part of the Zealandia continent
- Great South Basin – An area of mainly sea to the south of the South Island of New Zealand
- Healy (volcano) – Submarine volcano in New Zealand's Kermadec Islands
- Hikurangi Margin – Subduction zone off the east coast of New Zealand's North Island
- Hikurangi Plateau – An oceanic plateau in the South Pacific east of the North Island of New Zealand
- Hikurangi Trough – An oceanic trench in the bed of the Pacific off the east coast of the North Island of New Zealand
- Kermadec plate – A long, narrow tectonic plate west of the Kermadec Trench
- Kermadec Trench – A linear ocean trench in the south Pacific north west of New Zealand
- Maari oil field – An oilfield off the coast of South Taranaki, New Zealand
- Mahuika crater – A submarine feature of the New Zealand continental shelf hypothesized to be an extraterrestrial impact crater
- Maui gas field – The largest gas, natural gas condensate and oil field in New Zealand
- Monowai Seamount – A volcanic seamount to the north of New Zealand in the Kermadec arc
- Norfolk Ridge – A submarine ridge between New Caledonia and New Zealand
- Pohokura field – An oil and gas field offshore of north Taranaki in New Zealand
- Puysegur Trench – A deep cleft in the floor of the south Tasman Sea south of New Zealand's South Island
- Tonga-Kermadec Ridge – An oceanic ridge in the south-west Pacific Ocean underlying the Tonga-Kermadec island arc
- Zealandia – Mostly submerged mass of continental crust containing New Zealand and New Caledonia
- Oceanic basin – Large geologic basins that are below sea level

=== Oceanic ridges ===
- Central Basin Spreading Center – A seafloor spreading center of the West Philippine Sea Basin (geology)
- Mid-ocean ridge – An underwater mountain system formed by plate tectonic spreading
- List of submarine topographical features – Oceanic landforms and topographic elements.
- Oceanic core complex – A seabed geologic feature that forms a long ridge perpendicular to a mid-ocean ridge
- Overlapping spreading centers – A feature of spreading centers at mid-ocean ridges
- Propagating rift – A seafloor feature associated with spreading centers at mid-ocean ridges and back-arc basins
- Oceanic ridges of the Arctic Ocean –
  - Alpha Ridge – A major volcanic ridge under the Arctic Ocean
  - Chukchi Cap represented by Chukchi Plateau – A large subsea formation extending north from the Alaskan margin into the Arctic Ocean
  - Gakkel Ridge – A mid-oceanic ridge under the Arctic Ocean between the North American plate and the Eurasian plate
  - Lomonosov Ridge – An underwater ridge of continental crust in the Arctic Ocean
  - Mendeleev Ridge – A broad ridge in the Arctic Ocean from the Siberian Shelf to the central areas of the ocean
- Oceanic ridges of the Atlantic Ocean –
  - Aegir Ridge – An extinct mid-ocean ridge in the far-northern Atlantic Ocean
  - South American–Antarctic Ridge – Mid-ocean ridge in the South Atlantic between the South American plate and the Antarctic plate
  - Aves Ridge – A ridge in the eastern Caribbean Sea west of the Lesser Antilles Volcanic Arc
  - Cayman Ridge – A ridge in the eastern Caribbean Sea west of the Lesser Antilles Volcanic Arc
  - J-Anomaly Ridge – A ridge in the North Atlantic Ocean southeast of the Grand Banks of Newfoundland
  - Kings Trough – An undersea trough in the Atlantic Ocean on the east side of the Mid-Atlantic Ridge, northwest of the Açores-Biscay rise
  - Kolbeinsey Ridge – A segment of the Mid-Atlantic Ridge north of Iceland in the Arctic Ocean
  - Mid-Atlantic Ridge – A divergent tectonic plate boundary that in the North Atlantic separates the Eurasian and North American plates, and in the South Atlantic separates the African and South American plates
  - Rio Grande Rise – An aseismic ocean ridge in the southern Atlantic Ocean off the coast of Brazil
  - Southwest Indian Ridge – A mid-ocean ridge on the bed of the south-west Indian Ocean and south-east Atlantic Ocean
  - Walvis Ridge – An aseismic ocean ridge in the southern Atlantic Ocean.
  - Wyville Thomson Ridge – A feature of the North Atlantic Ocean floor between the Faroe Islands and Scotland
- Oceanic ridges of the Indian Ocean –
  - Aden Ridge – Part of an active oblique rift system in the Gulf of Aden, between Somalia and the Arabian Peninsula
  - Carlsberg Ridge – The northern section of the Central Indian Ridge between the African plate and the Indo-Australian plate
  - Central Indian Ridge – A north-south-trending mid-ocean ridge in the western Indian Ocean
  - Chagos–Laccadive Ridge – A volcanic ridge and oceanic plateau between the Northern and the Central Indian Ocean.
  - Eighty Five East Ridge – A near-linear, aseismic, age-progressive ridge in the northeastern Indian Ocean.
  - Ninety East Ridge – a linear ridge on the Indian Ocean floor near the 90th meridian
  - Southeast Indian Ridge – A mid-ocean ridge in the southern Indian Ocean
  - Southwest Indian Ridge – A mid-ocean ridge on the bed of the south-west Indian Ocean and south-east Atlantic Ocean
- Oceanic ridges of the Pacific Ocean –
  - Bowers Ridge – A currently seismically inactive ridge in the southern part of the Aleutian Basin
  - Carnegie Ridge – An aseismic ridge on the Nazca plate that is being subducted beneath the South American plate
  - Chile Rise – An oceanic ridge at the tectonic divergent plate boundary between the Nazca and Antarctic plates
  - D'Entrecasteaux Ridge – A double oceanic ridge in the south-west Pacific Ocean, north of New Caledonia and west of Vanuatu Islands
  - Darwin Rise – A broad triangular region in the north central Pacific Ocean where there is a concentration of atolls
  - East Pacific Rise – A mid-oceanic ridge at a divergent tectonic plate boundary on the floor of the Pacific Ocean
  - East Tasman Plateau – A submerged microcontinent south east of Tasmania
  - Explorer Ridge – A mid-ocean ridge west of British Columbia, Canada
  - Cocos–Nazca spreading centre – A divergent boundary between the South American coast and the triple junction of the Nazca plate, the Cocos plate, and the Pacific plate
  - Gorda Ridge – A tectonic spreading center off the northern coast of California and southern Oregon
  - Juan de Fuca Ridge – A tectonic spreading center off the northern coast of California and southern Oregon
  - Juan Fernández Ridge – A volcanic island and seamount chain on the Nazca plate
  - Kula-Farallon Ridge – An ancient mid-ocean ridge that existed between the Kula and Farallon plates in the Pacific Ocean during the Jurassic period
  - Lord Howe Rise – A deep sea plateau from south west of New Caledonia to the Challenger Plateau, west of New Zealand
  - Macquarie Fault Zone – A transform fault on the seafloor of the south Pacific Ocean from New Zealand southwestward to the Macquarie triple junction
  - Magellan Rise (ocean plateau) – An oceanic plateau in the Pacific Ocean
  - Mid-Pacific Mountains – An underwater mountain range from the southern tier of the Japan Trench to the Hawaiian Islands
  - Nazca Ridge – A submarine ridge on the Nazca plate off the west coast of South America
  - Norfolk Ridge – A submarine ridge between New Caledonia and New Zealand
  - Pacific–Antarctic Ridge – A divergent tectonic plate boundary located on the seafloor of the South Pacific Ocean, separating the Pacific plate from the Antarctic plate
  - Pacific-Farallon Ridge – A spreading ridge during the late Cretaceous that separated the Pacific plate to the west and the Farallon plate to the east
  - Pacific-Kula Ridge – A mid-ocean ridge between the Pacific and Kula plates in the Pacific Ocean during the Paleogene period
  - Phoenix Ridge – An ancient mid-ocean ridge between the Phoenix and Pacific plates
  - Researcher Ridge – A series of seamounts in the Atlantic Ocean
  - Shirshov Ridge – Seabed ridge on the eastern border of the Commander Basin below the Kamchatka Peninsula
  - Tehuantepec Ridge – A linear undersea ridge off the west coast of Mexico in the Pacific Ocean. It is the remnant of an old fracture zone
  - Tonga-Kermadec Ridge – An oceanic ridge in the south-west Pacific Ocean underlying the Tonga-Kermadec island arc
- Oceanic ridges of the Southern Ocean –
  - South American–Antarctic Ridge – Mid-ocean ridge in the South Atlantic between the South American plate and the Antarctic plate
  - Ligeti Ridge – An undersea ridge in the Southern Ocean (Edit)
  - Maud Rise – An oceanic plateau in the Southern Ocean
  - Pacific–Antarctic Ridge – A divergent tectonic plate boundary located on the seafloor of the South Pacific Ocean, separating the Pacific plate from the Antarctic plate
  - Phoenix Ridge – An ancient mid-ocean ridge between the Phoenix and Pacific plates
  - South Tasman Rise – An area of seafloor about 1500 m deep south of Hobart, Tasmania in the Southern Ocean
  - Southwest Indian Ridge – A mid-ocean ridge on the bed of the south-west Indian Ocean and south-east Atlantic Ocean
- Ridge volcanoes –
  - Axial Seamount – A submarine volcano on the Juan de Fuca Ridge west of Oregon
  - Beerenberg – A volcano on Jan Mayen island
  - Bouvet Island – Uninhabited subantarctic volcanic island
  - Bowie Seamount – Submarine volcano in the northeastern Pacific Ocean
  - Jan Mayen – Norwegian volcanic island situated in the Arctic Ocean
  - President Jackson Seamounts – A series of seamounts on the Pacific plate off California
  - Prince Edward Islands – Two small sub-Antarctic islands belonging to South Africa
  - Tuzo Wilson Seamounts – Two active submarine volcanoes off the coast of British Columbia, Canada
  - Vance Seamounts – A group of seven submarine volcanoes located west of the Juan de Fuca Ridge

=== Oceanic trenches ===
Oceanic trench – the deepest parts of the ocean floor, typically formed when one tectonic plate slides under another.

- Oceanic trenches of the Arctic Ocean:
  - Litke Deep – An oceanic trench in the Arctic Ocean
  - Molloy Deep – The deepest trench in the Arctic Ocean
- Oceanic trenches of the Atlantic Ocean
  - Cayman Trough – A complex transform fault zone pull-apart basin on the floor of the western Caribbean Sea
  - Devil's Hole (North Sea) – A group of deep trenches in the North Sea east of Dundee, Scotland
  - The Gully (Atlantic) – An underwater canyon in the Atlantic Ocean east of Nova Scotia
  - Hellenic Trench – A long narrow depression in the Ionian Sea
  - Kings Trough – An undersea trough in the Atlantic Ocean on the east side of the Mid-Atlantic Ridge, northwest of the Açores-Biscay rise
  - Milwaukee Deep – The deepest part of the Atlantic Ocean – part of the Puerto Rico Trench
  - Norwegian trench – An elongated depression in the sea floor off the southern coast of Norway
  - Puerto Rico Trench – An oceanic trench on a transform boundary between the Caribbean and North American plates
  - Romanche Trench – A trench in the Atlantic formed by the Romanche fracture zone on the Mid-Atlantic Ridge
  - South Sandwich Trench – A deep arcuate trench in the South Atlantic Ocean east of the South Sandwich Islands
  - Tongue of the Ocean – A deep oceanic trench in the Bahamas between Andros and New Providence islands
- Oceanic trenches of the Indian Ocean
  - Diamantina Deep – Part of the Diamantina Trench southwest of Perth, Western Australia
  - Diamantina fracture zone – An escarpment, separating two oceanic plateaus in the southeast Indian Ocean
  - Sumatra Trench – Subduction trench in the Sumatra-Andaman subduction zone in the eastern Indian Ocean
  - Sunda Trench – An oceanic trench in the Indian Ocean near Sumatra where the Australian-Capricorn plates subduct under a part of the Eurasian plate.
- Oceanic trenches of the Pacific Ocean
  - Aleutian Trench – An oceanic trench along the convergent plate boundary between the southern coastline of Alaska and the Aleutian islands
  - Farallon Trench – A subduction related tectonic formation off the coast of western California during the late to mid Cenozoic era
  - Galathea Depth – the portion the Philippine Trench exceeding 6,000-metre (20,000 ft) depths in the south-western Pacific Ocean
  - Hikurangi Trough – An oceanic trench in the bed of the Pacific off the east coast of the North Island of New Zealand
  - Intermontane Trench – An ancient oceanic trench during the Triassic, parallel to the west coast of North America
  - Izu–Ogasawara Trench – Aan oceanic trench in the western Pacific, consisting of the Izu Trench and the Bonin Trench
  - Japan Trench – An oceanic trench – part of the Pacific Ring of Fire – off northeast Japan
  - Kermadec Trench – A linear ocean trench in the south Pacific north west of New Zealand
  - Kuril–Kamchatka Trench – An oceanic trench in the northwest Pacific off the southeast coast of Kamchatka and parallels the Kuril Island chain to meet the Japan Trench east of Hokkaido
  - Manila Trench – Oceanic trench in the Pacific Ocean, west of Luzon and Mindoro in the Philippines
  - Mariana Trench – The deepest part of Earth's oceans, where the Pacific plate is subducted under the Mariana plate
  - Middle America Trench – A subduction zone in the eastern Pacific off the southwestern coast of Middle America
  - Peru–Chile Trench – An oceanic trench in the eastern Pacific Ocean off the coast of South America
  - Philippine Trench – A submarine trench to the east of the Philippines in the Pacific Ocean
  - Puysegur Trench – A deep cleft in the floor of the south Tasman Sea south of New Zealand's South Island
  - Ryukyu Trench – Oceanic trench along the southeastern edge of Japan's Ryukyu Islands in the Pacific Ocean
  - Tonga Trench – An oceanic trench in the south-west Pacific Ocean
  - Yap Trench – Oceanic trench in the western Pacific Ocean
- Oceanic trenches of the Southern Ocean
  - Tasman Fracture – An ocean trench off the south west coast of Tasmania
- Oceanic trenches of ancient oceans
- Tethyan Trench – An oceanic trench that existed in the northern part of the Tethys Ocean during the middle Mesozoic to early Cenozoic eras

=== Plate tectonics ===
Plate tectonics – The scientific theory that describes the large-scale motions of Earth's lithosphere

- Asthenosphere – The highly viscous, mechanically weak and ductile region of the Earth's upper mantle
- Convergent boundary – Region of active deformation between colliding lithospheric plates
- Divergent boundary – Linear feature that exists between two tectonic plates that are moving away from each other
- Flux melting – A process by which the melting point is reduced by the admixture of a material known as a flux
- Fracture zone – A junction between oceanic crustal regions of different ages on the same plate left by a transform fault
- Hydrothermal vent – A fissure in a planet's surface from which geothermally heated water issues
- Lithosphere – The rigid, outermost shell of a terrestrial-type planet or natural satellite that is defined by its rigid mechanical properties
- Lithosphere–asthenosphere boundary – A level representing a mechanical difference between layers in Earth's inner structure
- Marine geology – The study of the history and structure of the ocean floor
- Mid-ocean ridge – An underwater mountain system formed by plate tectonic spreading
- Mohorovičić discontinuity – Boundary between the Earth's crust and the mantle
- Oceanic crust – The uppermost layer of the oceanic portion of a tectonic plate
- Outer trench swell – A subtle ridge on the seafloor near an oceanic trench, where a descending plate begins to flex and fault
- Ridge push – A proposed driving force for tectonic plate motion as the result of the lithosphere sliding down the raised asthenosphere below mid-ocean ridges
- Seafloor spreading – A process at mid-ocean ridges, where new oceanic crust is formed through volcanic activity and then gradually moves away from the ridge
- Slab pull – That part of the motion of a tectonic plate that is caused by its subduction
- Slab suction – A plate tectonic driving force of shear tractions between the subducting slab and nearby plates
- Slab window – A gap that forms in a subducted oceanic plate when a mid-ocean ridge meets with a subduction zone and the ridge is subducted
- Subduction – A geological process at convergent tectonic plate boundaries where one plate moves under the other
- Superswell – A large area of anomalously high topography and shallow ocean regions
  - African superswell – A region including the Southern and Eastern African plateaus and the Southeastern Atlantic basin where exceptional tectonic uplift has occurred
  - Darwin Rise – A broad triangular region in the north central Pacific Ocean where there is a concentration of atolls
- Transform fault – A plate boundary where the motion is predominantly horizontal
- Vine–Matthews–Morley hypothesis – The first key scientific test of the seafloor spreading theory of continental drift and plate tectonics.
- Volcanic arc – A chain of volcanoes formed above a subducting plate

=== Seamounts ===
Seamount – A mountain rising from the ocean seafloor that does not reach to the water's surface

- Asphalt volcano – Ocean floor vents that erupt asphalt instead of lava
- Guyot – An isolated underwater volcanic mountain with a flat top
- List of seamounts by summit depth –
- Outline of Seamounts/Index of Seamounts?

==== Seamounts of the Atlantic Ocean ====
- American Scout Seamount – A seamount that appeared on charts, but was later not found to exist at the position given
- Anton Dohrn Seamount – A guyot in the Rockall Trough in the northeast Atlantic
- Cadamosto Seamount – A seamount in the North Atlantic Ocean southwest of the island of Brava, Cape Verde
- Caryn Seamount – A seamount in the Atlantic Ocean southwest of the New England Seamounts
- Charles Darwin volcanic field – A volcanic field off Santo Antao
- Condor seamount – A submarine mountain west-southwest of Faial Island in the Azores
- Coral Patch Seamount – A submarine mountain southwest of Portugal
- Corner Rise Seamounts – A chain of extinct submarine volcanoes in the northern Atlantic Ocean
  - Bean Seamount – A seamount in the northern Atlantic Ocean in the Corner Rise Seamounts
  - Caloosahatchee Seamount – A seamount in the northern Atlantic Ocean in the Corner Rise Seamounts
- Discovery Seamounts – A chain of seamounts in the Southern Atlantic Ocean
- Dom João de Castro Bank – A large submarine volcano in the north Atlantic between São Miguel and Terceira in the Azores
- Echo Bank – A seamount southwest of the Canary Islands
- Fogo Seamounts – A group of seamounts offshore of Newfoundland and southwest of the Grand Banks
  - Algerine Seamount – One of the Fogo Seamounts in the North Atlantic
  - Birma Seamount – One of the Fogo Seamounts in the North Atlantic
  - Carpathia Seamount – One of the Fogo Seamounts in the North Atlantic
  - Frankfurt Seamount – One of the Fogo Seamounts in the North Atlantic
  - Mackay-Bennett Seamount – One of the Fogo Seamounts in the North Atlantic
  - Montmagny Seamount – One of the Fogo Seamounts in the North Atlantic
  - Mount Temple Seamount – One of the Fogo Seamounts in the North Atlantic
- George Bligh Bank – A seamount in the Rockall Trough in the northeast Atlantic, west of Scotland
- Gorringe Ridge – A seamount in the Atlantic Ocean on the Azores–Gibraltar fault zone
- Hebrides Terrace Seamount – A seamount west-southwest of the Hebrides
- Henry Seamount – A seamount southeast of El Hierro
- Krylov Seamount – A seamount west of Cape Verde
- Monaco Bank (volcano) – A submarine volcano in the Azores
- Muir Seamount – Underwater volcano on the Bermuda rise in the Atlantic
- New England Seamounts – A chain of more than 20 seamounts in the Atlantic Ocean
  - Allegheny Seamount – One of the New England Seamounts in the North Atlantic
  - Asterias Seamount – One of the New England Seamounts in the North Atlantic
  - Balanus Seamount – One of the New England Seamounts in the North Atlantic
  - Bear Seamount – A flat-topped underwater volcano in the Atlantic Ocean. It is the oldest of the New England Seamounts
  - Buell Seamount – One of the New England Seamounts in the North Atlantic
  - Gerda Seamount – One of the New England Seamounts in the North Atlantic
  - Gilliss Seamount – One of the New England Seamounts in the North Atlantic
  - Gosnold Seamount – One of the New England Seamounts in the North Atlantic
  - Gregg Seamount – One of the New England Seamounts in the North Atlantic
  - Hodgson Seamount – One of the New England Seamounts in the North Atlantic
  - Kelvin Seamount – A guyot of the New England Seamounts in the North Atlantic
  - Kiwi Seamount, Atlantic Ocean – One of the New England Seamounts in the North Atlantic
  - Manning Seamount – One of the New England Seamounts in the North Atlantic
  - Michael Seamount – One of the New England Seamounts in the North Atlantic
  - Mytilus Seamount – One of the New England Seamounts in the North Atlantic
  - Nashville Seamount – One of the New England Seamounts in the North Atlantic
  - Panulirus Seamount – One of the New England Seamounts in the North Atlantic
  - Physalia Seamount – One of the New England Seamounts in the North Atlantic
  - Picket Seamount – One of the New England Seamounts in the North Atlantic
  - Rehoboth Seamount – One of the New England Seamounts in the North Atlantic
  - Retriever Seamount – One of the New England Seamounts in the North Atlantic
  - San Pablo Seamount – One of the New England Seamounts in the North Atlantic
  - Sheldrake Seamount – One of the New England Seamounts in the North Atlantic
  - Vogel Seamount – One of the New England Seamounts in the North Atlantic
- Newfoundland Ridge – An ocean ridge in the northern Atlantic Ocean on the east coast of Canada
- Newfoundland Seamounts – A group of seamounts offshore of Eastern Canada in the northern Atlantic Ocean.
- Princess Alice Bank – A seamount to the southwest of Pico and Faial in the Azores
- Protector Shoal – A submarine volcano NW of Zavodovski Island in the South Sandwich Islands
- Rosemary Bank – A seamount west of Scotland in the Rockall Trough
- Sahara Seamounts – A group of seamounts in the Atlantic Ocean southwest of the Canary Islands
- Sedlo Seamount – An isolated underwater volcano in the Northeast Atlantic, northeast of Graciosa Island
- Seewarte Seamounts – A north-south trending group of extinct submarine volcanoes in the northern Atlantic Ocean
  - Great Meteor Seamount – A large guyot in the Southern Azores Seamount Chain
- Spartel – A submerged former island in the Strait of Gibraltar near Cape Spartel and the Spartel Sill
- St. Helena Seamount chain – An underwater chain of seamounts in the southern Atlantic Ocean
- Tropic Seamount – A seamount southwest of the Canary Islands
- Vema Seamount – A seamount in the South Atlantic east of Cape Town
- Walvis Ridge – An aseismic ocean ridge in the southern Atlantic Ocean.
  - Ewing Seamount – A seamount in the southern Atlantic in the Walvis Ridge

==== Seamounts of the Indian Ocean ====
- Boomerang Seamount – An active submarine volcano northeast of Amsterdam Island in the Indian Ocean
- Christmas Island Seamount Province – A group of more than 50 submarine volcanos named for Christmas Island
- Muirfield Seamount – A submarine mountain in the Indian Ocean southwest of the Cocos (Keeling) Islands
- Walters Shoals – A group of submerged mountains off the coast of Madagascar

==== Seamounts of the Mediterranean ====
- Empedocles (volcano) – A large underwater volcano off the southern coast of Sicily
- Eratosthenes Seamount – A seamount in the Eastern Mediterranean south of western Cyprus
- Graham Island (Mediterranean Sea) – A submerged volcanic island south of Sicily
- Marsili – A large undersea volcano in the Tyrrhenian Sea south of Naples

==== Seamounts of the Pacific Ocean ====
- 2012 Kermadec Islands eruption – A major undersea volcanic eruption in the Kermadec Islands of New Zealand
- Abbott Seamount – A seamount lying within the Hawaiian-Emperor seamount chain in the northern Pacific Ocean
- Adams Seamount – A submarine volcano above the Pitcairn hotspot in the central Pacific Ocean
- Alexa Bank – A seamount in Samoa, northwest of Rotuma
- Allison Guyot – A seamount in the Mid-Pacific Mountains
- Banc Capel – A guyot, or flat-topped underwater volcano, in the Coral Sea
- Bollons Seamount – A continental fragment seamount southeast of New Zealand
- Bounty Seamount – A seamount in the Pacific Ocean near Pitcairn Island
  - Browns Mountain – A small submarine mountain in the south-western Pacific Ocean off the coast of New South Wales, Australia, east of Sydney.
- Cape Johnson Guyot – A seamount in the Pacific Ocean
- Capricorn Seamount – A seamount east of Tonga
- Carondelet Reef – A horseshoe-shaped reef of the Phoenix Islands in the Republic of Kiribati
- Chelan Seamount – A submerged volcano in the Pacific Ocean off the coast of Vancouver Island,
- Cobb–Eickelberg Seamount chain – A range of undersea mountains formed by volcanic activity of the Cobb hotspot in the Pacific Ocean
  - Axial Seamount – A submarine volcano on the Juan de Fuca Ridge west of Oregon
  - Brown Bear Seamount – An underwater volcano west of the coast of Oregon. It is connected to the larger Axial Seamount by a small ridge
  - Cobb Seamount – Underwater volcano west of Grays Harbor, Washington, United States
  - Patton Seamount – Underwater volcano in the Cobb–Eickelberg Seamount chain in the Gulf of Alaska
- Cordell Bank National Marine Sanctuary –
- Cortes Bank – A shallow seamount in the North Pacific Ocean southwest of Los Angeles
- Cross Seamount – A seamount far southwest of the Hawaii archipelago
- Crough Seamount – A seamount in the Pacific Ocean, within the exclusive economic zone of Pitcairn
- Daiichi-Kashima Seamount – A guyot in the Western Pacific Ocean off Japan
- Daikakuji Guyot – A seamount in the Hawaiian Emperor chain bend area
- Darwin Guyot – A seamount in the Pacific Ocean
- Davidson Seamount – Underwater volcano off the coast of Central California, southwest of Monterey
- Dellwood Seamounts – A seamount range in the Pacific Ocean northwest of Vancouver Island, Canada
- Detroit Seamount – One of the oldest seamounts of the Hawaiian-Emperor seamount chain
- Eastern Gemini Seamount – A seamount in the southwestern Pacific Ocean, about halfway between Vanuatu's Tanna and Matthew Islands
- Emperor of China (volcano) – A submarine volcano in the western part of the Banda Sea, Indonesia
- Erimo Seamount – A seamount off Japan which is in the process of being subducted
- Explorer Seamount – A seamount on the Explorer Ridge in the Pacific Ocean off the coast of British Columbia, Canada
- Ferrel Seamount – A small underwater volcano west of Baja California
- Filippo Reef – A reef that is asserted to be in the Pacific Ocean east of Starbuck Island in the Line Islands
- Foundation Seamounts – A series of seamounts in the southern Pacific Ocean in a chain which starts at the Pacific–Antarctic Ridge
- Geologists Seamounts – A group of 9 seamounts in the Pacific Ocean south of Honolulu, Hawaii
- Graham Seamount – Underwater volcano in the Pacific Ocean off the coast of the Queen Charlotte Islands, British Columbia, Canada
- Graveyard Seamounts – A series of 28 small underwater volcanoes on the Chatham Rise, east of New Zealand
- Green Seamount – An underwater volcano off the western coast of Mexico
- Guide Seamount – An underwater volcano in the eastern Pacific Ocean near the Davidson, Pioneer, Rodriguez, and Gumdrop seamounts
- Gumdrop Seamount – A small underwater volcano on the flank of Pioneer Seamount, off the coast of Central California
- Hawaiian–Emperor seamount chain – A mostly undersea mountain range in the Pacific Ocean that reaches above sea level in Hawaii.
  - List of volcanoes in the Hawaiian–Emperor seamount chain
  - Abbott Seamount – A seamount lying within the Hawaiian-Emperor seamount chain in the northern Pacific Ocean
  - Colahan Seamount – A seamount in the Hawaiian-Emperor seamount chain in the northern Pacific
  - Daikakuji Guyot – A seamount in the Hawaiian Emperor chain bend area
  - Detroit Seamount – One of the oldest seamounts of the Hawaiian-Emperor seamount chain
  - East Molokai Volcano – An extinct shield volcano comprising the eastern two-thirds of the island of Molokaʻi in the U.S. state of Hawaii.
  - Evolution of Hawaiian volcanoes – Processes of growth and erosion of the volcanoes of the Hawaiian islands
  - French Frigate Shoals – The largest atoll in the Northwestern Hawaiian Islands
  - Gardner Pinnacles – Two barren rock outcrops surrounded by a reef in the Northwestern Hawaiian Islands
  - Hancock Seamount – A seamount of the Hawaiian-Emperor seamount chain in the Pacific Ocean.
  - Hawaii hotspot – A volcanic hotspot located near the Hawaiian Islands, in the northern Pacific Ocean
  - Jingū Seamount – A guyot of the Hawaiian-Emperor seamount chain in the Pacific Ocean
  - Kaena Ridge – A submerged remnant of an ancient shield volcano to the north of the Hawaiian Island of Oʻahu
  - Kamaʻehuakanaloa Seamount (formerly Lōʻihi) – An active submarine volcano off the southeast coast of the island of Hawaii
  - Kammu Seamount – A seamount in the Hawaiian-Emperor seamount chain in the Pacific Ocean
  - Kaʻula – A small, crescent-shaped offshore islet in the Hawaiian Islands
  - Kimmei Seamount – A seamount of the Hawaiian-Emperor seamount chain in the northern Pacific Ocean.
  - Koko Guyot – A guyot near the southern end of the Emperor seamounts north of the bend in the Hawaiian-Emperor seamount chain.
  - Kure Atoll – An atoll in the Pacific Ocean in the Northwestern Hawaiian Islands
  - Lanai – The sixth-largest of the Hawaiian Islands
  - Laysan – One of the Northwestern Hawaiian Islands
  - Lisianski Island – One of the Northwestern Hawaiian Islands
  - Māhukona – A submerged shield volcano on the northwestern flank of the Island of Hawaiʻi
  - Maro Reef – A largely submerged coral atoll in the Northwestern Hawaiian Islands
  - Meiji Seamount – The oldest seamount in the Hawaiian-Emperor seamount chain
  - Midway Atoll – One of the United States Minor Outlying Islands in the Hawaiian archipelago
  - Necker Island (Hawaii) – A small island in the Northwestern Hawaiian Islands
  - Nīhoa – The tallest of ten islands and atolls in the uninhabited Northwestern Hawaiian Islands
  - Niihau – The westernmost and seventh largest inhabited island in Hawaiʻi
  - Nintoku Seamount – A flat topped seamount in the Hawaiian-Emperor seamount chain
  - Ojin Seamount – A guyot of the Hawaiian-Emperor seamount chain in the Pacific Ocean
  - Pearl and Hermes Atoll – Part of the Northwestern Hawaiian Islands
  - Penguin Bank – A now-submerged shield volcano of the Hawaiian Islands
  - Suiko Seamount – A guyot of the Hawaiian-Emperor seamount chain in the Pacific Ocean.
  - Waiʻanae Range – The eroded remains of an ancient shield volcano that comprises the western half of the Hawaiian Island of Oʻahu
  - West Maui Mountains – A much eroded shield volcano that constitutes the western one-quarter of the Hawaiian Island of Maui
  - Yomei Seamount – A seamount of the Hawaiian-Emperor seamount chain in the northern Pacific Ocean
  - Yuryaku Seamount – A flat topped seamount of the Hawaiian-Emperor seamount chain in the northern Pacific Ocean
- Heck Seamount – An underwater volcano in the Pacific Ocean off the coast of central Vancouver Island, British Columbia
- Hollister Ridge – A group of seamounts in the Pacific Ocean west of the Pacific–Antarctic Ridge
- Horizon Guyot – A guyot in the Mid-Pacific Mountains
- Ioah Guyot – A guyot in the Western Pacific Ocean
- Ita Mai Tai – A guyot in the Western Pacific Ocean
- Jasper Seamount – Underwater volcano in the Fieberling-Guadalupe seamount track, west of Baja California, Mexico
- Kavachi – An active submarine volcano in the south-west Pacific Ocean south of Vangunu Island in the Solomon Islands
- Kodiak–Bowie Seamount chain – A seamount chain in southeastern Gulf of Alaska stretching from the Aleutian Trench in the north to Bowie Seamount
  - Bowie Seamount – Submarine volcano in the northeastern Pacific Ocean
  - Denson Seamount – A submarine volcano in the Kodiak-Bowie Seamount chain at the end of the chain near the Canada–United States border
  - Hodgkins Seamount – A seamount in the Kodiak-Bowie Seamount chain in the north Pacific
  - Kodiak Seamount – The oldest seamount in the Kodiak-Bowie Seamount chain
  - Peirce Seamount – A member of the Kodiak-Bowie Seamount chain in the north Pacific
  - Tuzo Wilson Seamounts – Two active submarine volcanoes off the coast of British Columbia, Canada
- Koko Guyot – A guyot near the southern end of the Emperor seamounts north of the bend in the Hawaiian-Emperor seamount chain.
- Lamont seamount chain – A chain of seamounts in the Pacific Ocean
- Lemkein – A seamount in the Marshall Islands
- Limalok – A Cretaceous-Paleocene guyot in the Marshall Islands
- List of seamounts in the Marshall Islands –
- Lo-En – An Albian-Campanian guyot in the Marshall Islands in the Pacific Ocean
- Lōʻihi Seamount – An active submarine volcano off the southeast coast of the island of Hawaii
- Lomilik – A seamount in the Marshall Islands
- Lord Howe Seamount Chain – The seamount chain east of Australia that includes Lord Howe Island
- Louisville Ridge – A chain of over 70 seamounts in the Southwest Pacific Ocean
  - Osbourn Seamount – The westernmost and oldest non-subducted seamount of the Louisville Ridge
  - Louisville hotspot – A volcanic hotspot that formed the Louisville Ridge in the southern Pacific Ocean
- Macdonald seamount – A seamount in Polynesia, southeast of the Austral Islands
- Malulu – A submarine volcano south of American Samoa
- Marisla Seamount – Undersea mountain north-northeast of La Paz, Mexico
- Marpi Reef – A narrow seamount north of Saipan in the Northern Marianas
- MIT Guyot – A guyot in the Western Pacific northwest of Marcus Island and about halfway between Japan and the Marshall Islands
- Moai (seamount) – The second most westerly submarine volcano in the Easter Seamount Chain
- Monowai Seamount – A volcanic seamount to the north of New Zealand in the Kermadec arc
- Musicians Seamounts – A chain of seamounts in the Pacific Ocean, north of the Hawaiian Ridge
- Myōjin-shō – A submarine volcano south of Tokyo on the Izu–Ogasawara Ridge
- Nieuwerkerk (volcano) – A submarine volcano in the Banda Sea, Indonesia
- Oshawa Seamount – A submarine volcano in the Pacific off the coast of the Queen Charlotte Islands, British Columbia
- Osprey Reef – A submerged atoll in the Coral Sea, northeast of Queensland, Australia. It is part of the Northwestern Group of the Coral Sea Islands
- Pactolus Bank – Unconfirmed undersea bank in the southern Pacific Ocean.
- Panov Seamount – Minor seamount in the southeast Pacific near the western part of the Valdivia Fracture Zone
- Pasco banks – A long ridge-like seamount in the south Pacific
- Pioneer Seamount – An undersea mountain in the Pacific Ocean off the coast of central California
- Pito Seamount – A seamount in the Pacific Ocean north-northwest of Easter Island
- President Jackson Seamounts – A series of seamounts on the Pacific plate off California
- President Thiers Bank – A broad guyot, northwest of Rapa, southeast of Raivavae, in the Austral Islands
- Pukao (seamount) – A submarine volcano, the most westerly in the Easter Seamount Chain
- Rano Rahi seamounts – A field of seamounts in the Pacific Ocean, part of a series of ridges on the Pacific plate
- Resolution Guyot – A submerged island in the Mid-Pacific Mountains
- Rivadeneyra Shoal – A shoal or seamount reported from the Eastern Pacific Ocean between Malpelo Island and Cocos Island
- Rodriguez Seamount – A flat topped seamount off the coast of Central California
- Rosa Seamount – An uplifted piece of the sea floor west of the Baja California
- Ruwitūn̄tūn̄ – A guyot in the Marshall Islands in the Pacific Ocean
- Schmieder Bank – A rocky bank west of Point Sur, California, south of Monterey
- Seminole Seamount – A seamount in the Pacific Ocean off the coast of northern Vancouver Island, British Columbia
- Siletz River Volcanics – A sequence of basaltic pillow lavas that make up part of Siletzia
- South Chamorro Seamount – A large serpentinite mud volcano and seamount in the Izu–Bonin–Mariana Arc
- Stirni Seamount – A seamount in the Pacific Ocean off the coast of northern Vancouver Island, British Columbia
- Submarine 1922 – A submarine volcano found in the Sangihe Islands of Indonesia in 1922
- Suiyo Seamount – A submarine volcano off the eastern coast of Japan, at the southern tip of the Izu Islands.
- Supply Reef – A submerged circular reef of volcanic origin in the Northern Mariana Islands
- Takuyo-Daini – A guyot in the Western Pacific Ocean off Japan
- Takuyo-Daisan – A guyot in the Western Pacific Ocean off Japan
- Tamu Massif – An extinct submarine shield volcano located in the northwestern Pacific Ocean
- Taney Seamounts – Five extinct underwater volcanoes west of San Francisco on the Pacific plate
- Tasmanian Seamounts – A group of underwater volcanoes off the southern tip of Tasmania
- Tasmantid Seamount Chain – A long chain of seamounts in the South Pacific Ocean
- Taukina seamounts – A series of seamounts on the Pacific plate near the Macdonald hotspot and the Ngatemato seamounts
- Teahitia – A submarine volcano northeast of the southeast tip of Tahiti in the Society Islands
- Three Wise Men (volcanoes) – A row of three underwater volcanoes on the East Pacific Rise
- Tucker Seamount – A seamount in the Pacific Ocean off the coast of northern Vancouver Island, British Columbia
- Union Seamount – A seamount in the Pacific Ocean off the coast of northern Vancouver Island, British Columbia
- Vailulu'u – A volcanic seamount in the Samoa Islands
- Vance Seamounts – A group of seven submarine volcanoes located west of the Juan de Fuca Ridge
- Vlinder Guyot – A guyot in the Western Pacific Ocean
- Winslow Reef, Phoenix Islands – an underwater feature of the Phoenix Islands, Republic of Kiribati
- Wōdejebato – A guyot in the Marshall Islands northwest of the smaller Pikinni Atoll
- Yersey – A submarine volcano in Indonesia

==== Seamounts of the Southern Ocean – ====
- List of seamounts in the Southern Ocean –
- Adare Seamounts – The seamounts in Balleny Basin
- Balleny Seamounts – Seamounts named in association with the Balleny Islands
- Barsukov Seamount – A seamount named in honor of the Russian scientist, Valeri Barsukov
- Belgica Guyot – An undersea tablemount named for the Belgian research ship Belgica
- Dallmann Seamount – A seamount named for polar explorer Eduard Dallmann
- De Gerlache Seamounts – Seamounts in Antarctica, named for Lieutenant Adrien Victor Joseph de Gerlache
- Hakurei Seamount – A seamount off Adélie Land, Antarctica
- Iselin Seamount – A seamount in the Southern Ocean off Antarctica
- Kemp Caldera – A seamount-caldera pair south of the South Sandwich Islands
- Lecointe Guyot – An undersea tablemount named for Georges Lecointe, navigator/astronomer aboard the Belgica
- Lichtner Seamount – A seamount in the Southern Ocean
- Maud Seamount – A seamount in the Southern Ocean
- Orca Seamount – Underwater volcano near King George Island in Antarctica, in the Bransfield Strait.
- Rosenthal Seamount – A seamount in the Weddell Sea named for Alfred Rosenthal
- Wordie Seamount – A seamount in Bransfield Strait, Antarctica

=== Subduction zones ===
Subduction zones – A geological process at convergent tectonic plate boundaries where one plate moves under the other

- Aleutian subduction zone – Convergence boundary between the North American plate and the Pacific plate, that extends from the Alaska Range to the Kamchatka Peninsula.
- Aleutian Trench – An oceanic trench along the convergent plate boundary between the southern coastline of Alaska and the Aleutian islands
- Cascadia subduction zone – Convergent plate boundary that stretches from northern Vancouver Island to Northern California
- Farallon Trench – A subduction related tectonic formation off the coast of western California during the late to mid Cenozoic era
- Galathea Depth – The portion the Philippine Trench exceeding 6,000-metre (20,000 ft) depths in the south-western Pacific Ocean
- Hikurangi Margin – Subduction zone off the east coast of New Zealand's North Island
- Hikurangi Trough – An oceanic trench in the bed of the Pacific off the east coast of the North Island of New Zealand
- Intermontane Trench – An ancient oceanic trench during the Triassic, parallel to the west coast of North America
- Izu–Ogasawara Trench – Aan oceanic trench in the western Pacific, consisting of the Izu Trench and the Bonin Trench
- Japan Trench – An oceanic trench – part of the Pacific Ring of Fire – off northeast Japan
- Kermadec Trench – A linear ocean trench in the south Pacific north west of New Zealand
- Kermadec-Tonga subduction zone – A convergent plate boundary that stretches from the North Island of New Zealand northward
- Kuril–Kamchatka Trench – An oceanic trench in the northwest Pacific off the southeast coast of Kamchatka and parallels the Kuril Island chain to meet the Japan Trench east of Hokkaido
- Lesser Antilles subduction zone – A convergent plate boundary along the eastern margin of the Lesser Antilles island arc
- Makran Trench – A subduction zone along the northeastern margin of the Gulf of Oman adjacent to the southwestern coast of Balochistan of Pakistan and the southeastern coast of Iran
- Manila Trench – Oceanic trench in the Pacific Ocean, west of Luzon and Mindoro in the Philippines
- Mariana Trench – The deepest part of Earth's oceans, where the Pacific plate is subducted under the Mariana plate
- Middle America Trench – A subduction zone in the eastern Pacific off the southwestern coast of Middle America
- Peru–Chile Trench – An oceanic trench in the eastern Pacific Ocean off the coast of South America
- Philippine Trench – A submarine trench to the east of the Philippines in the Pacific Ocean
- Puerto Rico Trench – An oceanic trench on a transform boundary between the Caribbean and North American plates
- Puysegur Trench – A deep cleft in the floor of the south Tasman Sea south of New Zealand's South Island
- Ryukyu Trench – Oceanic trench along the southeastern edge of Japan's Ryukyu Islands in the Pacific Ocean
- South Sandwich Trench – A deep arcuate trench in the South Atlantic Ocean east of the South Sandwich Islands
- Sumatra Trench – Subduction trench in the Sumatra-Andaman subduction zone in the eastern Indian Ocean
- Sunda Trench – An oceanic trench in the Indian Ocean near Sumatra where the Australian-Capricorn plates subduct under a part of the Eurasian plate.
- Tonga Trench – An oceanic trench in the south-west Pacific Ocean
- Tonga-Kermadec Ridge – An oceanic ridge in the south-west Pacific Ocean underlying the Tonga-Kermadec island arc
- Yap Trench – Oceanic trench in the western Pacific Ocean
- Zagros fold and thrust belt – zone of deformed crustal rocks, formed in the foreland of the collision between the Arabian plate and the Eurasian plate

=== Submarine calderas ===
Submarine calderas – Volcanic calderas that are partially or fully submerged under the water of a larger ocean or lake, sometimes forming a reef, bay or harbor.

- Aden – Port city and temporary capital of Yemen
- Aira Caldera – A large flooded coastal volcanic caldera in the south of the island of Kyūshū, Japan
- Auckland Islands – A volcanic archipelago of New Zealand's subantarctic islands
- Avacha Bay – A Pacific Ocean bay on the southeastern coast of the Kamchatka Peninsula
- Deception Island – An island in the South Shetland Islands archipelago, with one of the safest harbours in Antarctica
- Iwo Jima – Island of the Japanese Volcano Islands chain south of the Ogasawara Islands
- Kāneʻohe Bay – Large bay of volcanic origin in the Hawaiian island O'ahu
- Kikai Caldera – A mostly submerged caldera in the Ōsumi Islands of Kagoshima Prefecture, Japan.
- Kolumbo – Active submarine volcano in the Aegean Sea near Santorini
- Krakatoa – A volcanic island in the Sunda Strait between Java and Sumatra in Indonesia
- Kuwae – A submarine caldera between the Epi and Tongoa islands in Vanuatu
- Lvinaya Past – A volcano in the southern part of Iturup in the Kuril Islands, claimed by Japan and administered by Russia
- Lyttelton Harbour – Inlet in the Banks Peninsula, on the coast of Canterbury, New Zealand
- Macauley Island – A volcanic island in New Zealand's Kermadec Islands
- Milos – A volcanic Greek island in the Aegean Sea, just north of the Sea of Crete
- Otago Harbour – The natural harbour of Dunedin, New Zealand
- Phlegraean Fields – A large volcanic area west of Naples, Italy
- Rabaul caldera – A large volcano on the tip of the Gazelle Peninsula in East New Britain, Papua New Guinea
- Raoul Island – A volcano in the Kermadec Islands, New Zealand
- Santorini – A volcanic island in the southern Aegean Sea

== Paleoceanography ==
Paleoceanography – The study of the history of the oceans in the geologic past

- Anoxic event – Intervals in the Earth's past where parts of oceans were depleted of oxygen at depth over a large geographic area
- Geologic temperature record – Changes in Earth's environment as determined from geologic evidence on multi-million to billion year time scales
- Gulf Trough – An ancient geologic feature of Florida present during the Paleogene period
- List of ancient oceans – A list of former oceans that disappeared due to tectonic movements and other geographical and climatic changes
- Marine isotope stage – Alternating warm and cool periods in the Earth's paleoclimate, deduced from oxygen isotope data
- Marine Isotope Stage 5 – A stage in the geologic temperature record, between 130,000 and 80,000 years ago
- Marine Isotope Stage 11 – A stage in the geologic temperature record, covering the interglacial period between 424,000 and 374,000 years ago
- Marine Isotope Stage 13 – A stage in the geologic temperature record, covering the interglacial period between ~524,000 and 474,000 years ago
- Maui Nui – Name given to a prehistoric Hawaiian Island built from seven shield volcanoes (paleo?)
- Proxy (climate) – reserved physical characteristics allowing reconstruction of past climatic conditions
- Quaternary – Third and current period of the Cenozoic geological era
- Termination (geomorphology) – The period of time during a glacial cycle when there is a relatively rapid transition from full glacial climates to full interglacial climates

== Physical Oceanography ==
(Outline of physical oceanography – Hierarchical outline list of articles on physical oceanography)

Physical oceanography – The study of physical conditions and physical processes within the ocean

=== Acoustics ===
Acoustical oceanography – The use of underwater sound to study the sea, its boundaries and its contents

- Deep scattering layer – A layer in the ocean consisting of a variety of marine animals that migrate vertically every day
- Hydroacoustics – The study and technological application of sound in water
- Ocean acoustic tomography – A technique used to measure temperatures and currents over large regions of the ocean
- SOFAR channel – A horizontal layer of water in the ocean at which depth the speed of sound is at its minimum
- Underwater acoustics – The study of the propagation of sound in water and the interaction of sound waves with the water and its boundaries

=== Circulation ===
Circulation terminology and concepts:

- Atmospheric circulation – The large-scale movement of air, a process which distributes thermal energy about the Earth's surface
- Baroclinity – A measure of misalignment between the gradient of pressure and the gradient of density in a fluid
- Boundary current – Ocean current with dynamics determined by the presence of a coastline
- Coriolis force – Inertial force that acts on objects in motion relative to a rotating reference frame
- Coriolis–Stokes force – A forcing of the mean flow in a rotating fluid due to interaction of the Coriolis effect and wave-induced Stokes drift
- Craik–Leibovich vortex force – A forcing of the mean flow through wave–current interaction
- Downwelling – The process of accumulation and sinking of higher density material beneath lower density material
- Drift seed – Seeds and fruits adapted for long-distance dispersal by water
- Eddy – The swirling of a fluid and the reverse current created when the fluid is in a turbulent flow regime
- Ekman layer – The layer in a fluid where there is a force balance between pressure gradient force, Coriolis force and turbulent drag
- Ekman spiral – A structure of currents or winds near a horizontal boundary in which the flow direction rotates as one moves away from the boundary
- Ekman transport – Net transport of surface water perpendicular to wind direction
- Front (oceanography) – A boundary between two distinct water masses
- Geostrophic balance – The balance between the pressure gradient force and the Coriolis force that governs large-scale ocean currents
- Halothermal circulation – The part of the large-scale ocean circulation that is driven by global density gradients created by surface heat and evaporation
- Hydrothermal circulation – Circulation of water driven by heat exchange
- Langmuir circulation – A series of shallow, slow, counter-rotating vortices at the ocean's surface aligned with the wind
- Longshore drift – Sediment moved by the longshore current
- Retroflect – The movement of an ocean current that doubles back on itself
- Rip current – Narrow current of water which moves directly away from the shore, cutting through the lines of breaking waves
- Rogue wave – Relatively large and spontaneous ocean surface waves that occur at sea
- Shutdown of thermohaline circulation – An effect of global warming on a major ocean circulation.
- Subsurface currents – Oceanic currents that flow beneath surface currents
- Sverdrup – Unit of measurement of the volumetric rate of transport of ocean currents
- Sverdrup balance – A theoretical relationship between the wind stress exerted on the surface of the open ocean and the vertically integrated meridional (north-south) transport of ocean water.
- Thermohaline circulation – A part of the large-scale ocean circulation that is driven by global density gradients created by surface heat and freshwater fluxes
- Turbidity current – An underwater current of usually rapidly moving, sediment-laden water moving down a slope
- Upwelling – The replacement by deep water moving upwards of surface water driven offshore by wind
- Warm core ring – A type of mesoscale eddy which breaks off from a warm ocean current. The ring is an independent circulatory system of warm water which can persist for several months
- Whirlpool – Body of rotating water produced by the meeting of opposing currents

==== Circulation phenomena ====
- Antarctic Circumpolar Wave – A coupled ocean/atmosphere wave that circles the Southern Ocean eastward in approximately eight years
- Barents Sea Opening – The sea between Bear Island in the south of Svalbard and the north of Norway through which water flows from the Atlantic into the Arctic Ocean
- Black Sea undersea river – A current of particularly saline water flowing through the Bosphorus Strait and along the seabed of the Black Sea
- Coastal upwelling of the South Eastern Arabian Sea – A typical eastern boundary upwelling system
- El Niño – Warm phase of a cyclic climatic phenomenon in the Pacific Ocean
- El Niño–Southern Oscillation – Irregularly periodic variation in winds and sea surface temperatures over the tropical eastern Pacific Ocean
- Great South Australian Coastal Upwelling System – A seasonal upwelling system in the eastern Great Australian Bight
- Interdecadal Pacific oscillation – An oceanographic/meteorological phenomenon similar to the Pacific decadal oscillation (PDO), but occurring in a wider area of the Pacific
- La Niña – A coupled ocean-atmosphere phenomenon that is the counterpart of El Niño
- North Atlantic oscillation – A weather phenomenon in the North Atlantic Ocean of fluctuations in the difference of atmospheric pressure at sea level between the Icelandic low and the Azores high
- Ocean current – Directional mass flow of oceanic water generated by external or internal forces
- Ocean gyre – Any large system of recirculating ocean currents
- Pacific decadal oscillation – A robust, recurring pattern of ocean-atmosphere climate variability centered over the mid-latitude Pacific basin
- Pacific–North American teleconnection pattern – A large-scale weather pattern with two modes which relates the atmospheric circulation pattern over the North Pacific Ocean with the one over the North American continent
- South Pacific convergence zone – A band of low-level convergence, cloudiness and precipitation extending from the Western Pacific Warm Pool at the maritime continent south-eastwards towards French Polynesia and as far as the Cook Islands
- Tropical Atlantic SST Dipole – A cross-equatorial sea surface temperature pattern that appears dominant on decadal timescales

To be sorted:

- Fram Strait – The passage between Greenland and Svalbard
- Moby-Duck – Book by Donovan Hohn on the Friendly Floatees
- Subtropical front – (unclear, but generic)
- The Blob (Pacific Ocean) – A large mass of relatively warm water in the Pacific Ocean off the coast of North America (circulation)
- Great Salinity Anomaly – A significant disturbance caused by a major pulse of freshwater input to the Nordic Seas
- Labrador Sea Water – A water mass formed by convective processes in the Labrador Sea
- Subtropical Indian Ocean Dipole – The oscillation of sea surface temperatures in which the Indian Ocean southeast of Madagascar is warmer and then colder than the eastern part off Australia
- Tropical instability waves – A phenomenon in which the interface between areas of warm and cold sea surface temperatures near the equator form a regular pattern of westward-propagating waves

===== Currents of the Arctic Ocean =====
- Baffin Island Current – An ocean current running south down the western side of Baffin Bay in the Arctic Ocean, along Baffin Island
- Beaufort Gyre – A wind-driven ocean current in the Arctic Ocean polar region
- East Greenland Current – A cold, low salinity current that extends from Fram Strait to Cape Farewell off the eastern coat of Greenland
- East Iceland Current – A cold water ocean current that forms as a branch of the East Greenland Current
- Labrador Current – A cold current in the Atlantic Ocean along the coasts of Labrador, Newfoundland and Nova Scotia
- Lomonosov Current – A deep current in the Atlantic Ocean. from the coast of Brazil to the Gulf of Guinea
- North Icelandic Jet – A deep-reaching current that flows along the continental slope of Iceland
- Norwegian Current – A current that flows northeasterly along the Atlantic coast of Norway into the Barents Sea
- Transpolar Drift Stream – An ocean current of the Arctic Ocean
- West Greenland Current – A weak cold water current that flows to the north along the west coast of Greenland.
- West Spitsbergen Current – A warm, salty current that runs poleward just west of Spitsbergen

===== Currents of the Atlantic Ocean =====
- Angola Current – A temporary ocean surface current. It is an extension of the Guinea Current, flowing near western Africa's coast
- Antilles Current – A highly variable surface ocean current of warm water that flows northeasterly past the island chain that separates the Caribbean Sea and the Atlantic Ocean
- Atlantic meridional overturning circulation – A system of currents in the Atlantic Ocean, having a northward flow of warm, salty water in the upper layers and a southward flow of colder, deep waters that are part of the thermohaline circulation
- Azores Current – A generally eastward to southeastward-flowing current in the North Atlantic, originating near the Grand Banks of Newfoundland where it splits from the Gulf Stream
- Baffin Island Current – An ocean current running south down the western side of Baffin Bay in the Arctic Ocean, along Baffin Island
- Benguela Current – The broad, northward flowing ocean current that forms the eastern portion of the South Atlantic Ocean gyre
- Black Sea undersea river – A current of particularly saline water flowing through the Bosphorus Strait and along the seabed of the Black Sea
- Brazil Current – A warm current that flows south along the Brazilian south coast to the mouth of the Río de la Plata
- Canary Current – A wind-driven surface current that is part of the North Atlantic Gyre
- Cape Horn Current – A cold water current that flows west-to-east around Cape Horn
- Caribbean Current – A warm ocean current that flows northwestward through the Caribbean from the east along the coast of South America into the Gulf of Mexico
- East Greenland Current – A cold, low salinity current that extends from Fram Strait to Cape Farewell off the eastern coat of Greenland
- East Iceland Current – A cold water ocean current that forms as a branch of the East Greenland Current
- Falkland Current – A cold water current that flows northward along the Atlantic coast of Patagonia as far north as the mouth of the Río de la Plata
- Florida Current – A thermal ocean current that flows from the Straits of Florida around the Florida Peninsula and along the southeastern coast of the United States before joining the Gulf Stream near Cape Hatteras
- Good Hope Jet – The northward-running shelf edge frontal jet of the Southern Benguela Current off the Cape Peninsula of South Africa's west coast
- Guinea Current – A slow warm water current that flows to the east along the Guinea coast of West Africa
- Gulf Stream – A warm, swift Atlantic current that originates in the Gulf of Mexico flows round the tip of Florida, along the east coast of the United States before crossing the Atlantic Ocean
- Irminger Current – A north Atlantic current setting westward off the southwest coast of Iceland
- Labrador Current – A cold current in the Atlantic Ocean along the coasts of Labrador, Newfoundland and Nova Scotia
- Lomonosov Current – A deep current in the Atlantic Ocean. from the coast of Brazil to the Gulf of Guinea
- Loop Current – A warm ocean current that flows northward between Cuba and the Yucatán Peninsula into the Gulf of Mexico, loops east and south and exits to the east through the Florida Straits to join the Gulf Stream
- Mann Eddy – A persistent clockwise circulation in the middle of the North Atlantic Ocean
- North Atlantic Current – A powerful warm western boundary current in the north Atlantic Ocean that extends the Gulf Stream northeastward
- North Atlantic Gyre – A major circular system of ocean currents
- North Brazil Current – A warm current that is part of the southwestern North Atlantic Gyre which begins by splitting from the Atlantic South Equatorial Current and flows aling the northwest coast of Brazil until it becomes the Guiana Current
- North Equatorial Current – (dubious – unsourced)
- Norwegian Current – A current that flows northeasterly along the Atlantic coast of Norway into the Barents Sea
- Portugal Current – A weak warm water current that flows south-easterly towards the coast of Portugal
- Rossby whistle – The oscillation of sea-level and bottom pressure in the Caribbean Sea influenced by an oceanic Rossby wave.
- South Atlantic Current – An eastward ocean current, fed by the Brazil Current
- South Equatorial Current – (dubious – unsourced)
- West Greenland Current – A weak cold water current that flows to the north along the west coast of Greenland.
- West Spitsbergen Current – A warm, salty current that runs poleward just west of Spitsbergen

===== Currents of the Indian Ocean =====
- Agulhas Current – The western boundary current of the southwest Indian Ocean that flows down the east coast of Africa
- Agulhas Return Current – An ocean current in the South Indian Ocean flowing from the Agulhas retroflection along the subtropical front
- East Madagascar Current – Current that flows southward on the east side of Madagascar and subsequently feeds the Agulhas Current
- Equatorial Counter Current – An eastward moving, wind-driven current flowing 10-15m deep found in the Atlantic, Indian, and Pacific Oceans
- Indian Monsoon Current – The seasonally varying ocean current regime found in the tropical regions of the northern Indian Ocean
- Indonesian Throughflow – Ocean current that provides a low-latitude pathway for warm, relatively fresh water to move from the Pacific to the Indian Ocean
- Leeuwin Current – A warm ocean current which flows southwards near the western coast of Australia. It rounds Cape Leeuwin to enter the waters south of Australia where its influence extends as far as Tasmania
- Madagascar Current – The Madagascar current is split into two currents, the North Madagascar Current and the East Madagascar Current
- Mozambique Current – A warm ocean current in the Indian Ocean flowing south along the African east coast in the Mozambique Channel
- North Madagascar Current – an ocean current near Madagascar that flows into the South Equatorial Current just north of Madagascar and is directed into the Mozambique Channel
- Somali Current – An ocean boundary current that flows along the coast of Somalia and Oman in the Western Indian Ocean
- South Australian –
- South Equatorial Current – Ocean current in the Pacific, Atlantic, and Indian Ocean that flows east-to-west between the equator and about 20 degrees south
- South-West Madagascar Coastal Current – A warm poleward ocean current flowing in the south-west of Madagascar
- West Australian Current – A cool surface current that starts as the Southern Indian Ocean Current and turns north when it approaches Western Australia

===== Currents of the Pacific Ocean =====
- Alaska Current – A warm-water current flowing northwards along the coast of British Columbia and the Alaska Panhandle
- Aleutian Current – An eastward flowing ocean current which lies north of the North Pacific Current;
- California Current – A Pacific Ocean current that flows southward along the western coast of North America from southern British Columbia to the southern Baja California Peninsula
- Cromwell Current – An eastward-flowing subsurface current that extends along the equator in the Pacific Ocean
- Davidson Current – A coastal countercurrent of the Pacific Ocean flowing north along the western coast of the United States from Baja California, Mexico to northern Oregon
- East Australian Current – The southward flowing western boundary current that is formed from the South Equatorial Current reaching the eastern coast of Australia
- East Korea Warm Current – An ocean current in the Sea of Japan which branches off from the Tsushima Current at the eastern end of the Korea Strait, and flows north along the southeastern coast of the Korean peninsula
- Equatorial Counter Current – An eastward moving, wind-driven current flowing 10-15m deep found in the Atlantic, Indian, and Pacific Oceans
- Humboldt Current – A cold, low-salinity eastern boundary current that flows north along the western coast of South America from southern Chile to northern Peru
- Indonesian Throughflow – Ocean current that provides a low-latitude pathway for warm, relatively fresh water to move from the Pacific to the Indian Ocean
- Kamchatka Current – A cold-water current flowing south-westward from the Bering Strait, along the Siberian Pacific coast and the Kamchatka Peninsula
- Kuroshio Current – North flowing ocean current on the west side of the North Pacific Ocean
- Mindanao Current – A narrow, southward flowing ocean current along the eastward side of the southern Philippines
- Mindanao Eddy – A semi-permanent cold-ring eddy formed in the retroflection area of the Mindanao Current.
- North Equatorial Current – A Pacific and Atlantic Ocean current that flows east-to-west between about 10° north and 20° north on the southern side of a clockwise subtropical gyre
- North Korea Cold Current – A cold water current in the Sea of Japan that flows southward from near Vladivostok along the coast of the Korean Peninsula
- North Pacific Current – A slow warm water current that flows west-to-east between 30 and 50 degrees north in the Pacific Ocean
- Oyashio Current – A cold subarctic ocean current that flows south and circulates counterclockwise in the western North Pacific Ocean
- South Equatorial Current – Ocean current in the Pacific, Atlantic, and Indian Ocean that flows east-to-west between the equator and about 20 degrees south
- Subtropical Countercurrent – A narrow eastward ocean current in the central North Pacific Ocean
- Tasman Front – A relatively warm water east-flowing surface current and thermal boundary that separates the Coral Sea to the north and the Tasman Sea to the south
- Tasman Outflow – A deepwater current that flows from the Pacific Ocean past Tasmania into the Southern Ocean that encircles Antarctica

===== Currents of the Southern Ocean =====
- Antarctic Circumpolar Current – Ocean current that flows clockwise from west to east around Antarctica
- Tasman Outflow – A deepwater current that flows from the Pacific Ocean past Tasmania into the Southern Ocean that encircles Antarctica

==== Ocean gyres ====
Ocean gyre – Any large system of recirculating ocean currents

- Beaufort Gyre – A wind-driven ocean current in the Arctic Ocean polar region
- Indian Ocean Gyre – A large systems of rotating ocean currents. The Indian Ocean gyre is composed of two major currents: the South Equatorial Current, and the West Australian Current
- North Atlantic Gyre – A major circulating system of ocean currents
- North Pacific Gyre – A major circulating system of ocean currents
- North Pacific Subtropical Gyre represented by Ecosystem of the North Pacific Subtropical Gyre –The largest contiguous ecosystem on earth and a major circulating system of ocean currents
- Ross Gyre – A circulating system of ocean currents in the Ross Sea
- South Atlantic Gyre – The subtropical gyre in the south Atlantic Ocean
- South Pacific Gyre – A major circulating system of ocean currents
- Weddell Gyre – One of the two gyres that exist within the Southern Ocean

=== Coastal and oceanic landforms ===
Landforms – Natural features of the solid surface of the Earth or other planetary body

- Bathymetric chart – Map visually representing the submerged terrain
- Hydrography – Applied science of measurement and description of physical features of bodies of water
- Superswell – A large area of anomalously high topography and shallow ocean regions
- Volcanic arc – A chain of volcanoes formed above a subducting plate
- Wave-cut platform – The narrow flat area often found at the base of a sea cliff or along the shoreline of a lake, bay, or sea that was created by erosion
- Windwatt – A type of mudflat exposed as a result of wind action on water

==== Coastal landforms ====
- Anchialine pool – A landlocked body of water with a subterranean connection to the ocean.
- Archipelago – A group of islands
  - List of archipelagos – A list of archipelagoes, organized by oceans and seas and then arranged alphabetically
  - List of archipelagos by number of islands – List of archipelagos by number of islands, islets, reefs, coral reefs and cays
- Arm (geography) – A narrow extension of water extending out from a much larger body of water
- Atoll – Ring-shaped coral reef, generally formed over a subsiding oceanic volcano, with a central lagoon and perhaps islands around the rim
- Baïne – A pool of water between a beach and the mainland, parallel to the beach and connected to the sea at one or more points along its length
- Barrier island – A coastal dune landform that forms by wave and tidal action parallel to the mainland coast
- Bay – A recessed, coastal body of water connected to an ocean or lake
- Baymouth bar – A depositional feature as a result of longshore drift, a sandbank that partially or completely closes access to a bay.
- Beach – Area of loose particles at the edge of the sea or other body of water
- Beachrock – A friable to well-cemented sedimentary rock that consists of a variable mixture of gravel-, sand-, and silt-sized sediment that is cemented with carbonate minerals and has formed along a shoreline
- Beach cusps – Shoreline formations made up of various grades of sediment in an arc pattern
- Beach ridge – Wave-swept or wave-deposited ridge running parallel to a shoreline
- Bight (geography) – Wave-swept or wave-deposited ridge running parallel to a shoreline
- Blowhole (geology) – Hole at the top of a sea-cave which allows waves to force water or spray out of the hole
- Bodden – Brackish bodies of water often forming lagoons, along the southwestern shores of the Baltic Sea
- Brine pool – An area of high density brine collected in a depression on the ocean floor
- Cape (geography) – A large headland extending into a body of water, usually the sea
- Channel (geography) – A type of landform in which part of a body of water is confined to a relatively narrow but long region
- Chevron (land form) – A wedge-shaped sediment deposit observed on coastlines and continental interiors around the world
- Cliff – A vertical, or near vertical, rock face of substantial height
- Cliff-top dune – Dune that occurs on the top of a cliff
- Cliffed coast – A form of coast where the action of marine waves has formed steep cliffs that may or may not be precipitous
- Coast – Area where land meets the sea or ocean
- Coastal erosion – The loss or displacement of land along the coastline due to the action of waves, currents, tides. wind-driven water, waterborne ice, or other impacts of storms
- Coastal geography – The study of the region between the ocean and the land
- Coastal plain – An area of flat, low-lying land adjacent to a seacoast
- Coastal waterfall – A waterfall that plunges directly into the sea
- Cuspate foreland – Geographical features found on coastlines and lakeshores that are created primarily by longshore drift
- Dune – A hill of loose sand built by aeolian processes or the flow of water
- Estuary – A partially enclosed coastal body of brackish water with one or more rivers or streams flowing into it, and with a free connection to the open sea
- Fajã – A supratidal talus-platform geology of landslides or lava flows at the bottom of cliffs
- Faraglioni – Italian term used to refer to rock stacks
- Firth – Scottish word used for various coastal inlets and straits
- Fjard – A glacially formed, broad, shallow inlet
- Fjord – A long, narrow inlet with steep sides or cliffs, created by glacial activity
- Flat coast – Shoreline where the land descends gradually into the sea
- Gat (landform) – A relatively narrow but deep strait that is constantly eroded by currents flowing back and forth, such as tidal currents
- Gut (coastal geography) – A narrow coastal body of water, a channel or strait, usually one that is subject to strong tidal currents, or a small creek
- Headland – A landform extending into a body of water, often with significant height and drop
- Ingression coast – A generally low coastline that is shaped by the penetration of the sea as a result of crustal movements or a rise in the sea level
- Inlet – An indentation of a shoreline that often leads to an enclosed body of salt water, such as a sound, bay, lagoon, or marsh
- Island – Any piece of sub-continental land that is surrounded by water
- Island arc – Arc-shaped archipelago usually along a subduction zone
- Islet – A very small island
- Lagoon – A shallow body of water separated from a larger body of water by barrier islands or reefs
- Moaning sandbar – Harbor shoals that are known for tidal noises
- Narrows – A restricted land or water passage
- Natural arch – A natural rock formation where a rock arch forms
- Peninsula – A piece of land that is bordered by water on three sides but connected to mainland
  - List of peninsulas –
- Perched coastline – A fossil coastline currently above the present coastline
- Presque-isle – A peninsula with narrow connection to mainland
- Pseudo-atoll – An island that encircles a lagoon, either partially or completely that is not formed by subsidence or coral reefs
- Raised beach – A beach or wave-cut platform raised above the shoreline by a relative fall in the sea level
- Raised coral atoll – An atoll that has been lifted high enough above sea level by tectonic forces to protect it from scouring by storms
- Raised shoreline – An ancient shoreline exposed above current water level.
- Ria – A coastal inlet formed by the partial submergence of an unglaciated river valley
- Roadstead – An open anchorage affording some shelter, but less protection than a harbor
- Rocky shore – An intertidal area of coast where solid rock predominates
- Salt marsh – A coastal ecosystem in the upper coastal intertidal zone between land and open saltwater or brackish water that is regularly flooded by the tides
- Salt pannes and pools – Water retaining depressions located within salt and brackish marshes
- Sandbank represented by Shoal –
- Sea cave – A cave formed by the wave action of the sea and located along present or former coastlines
- Shore – The fringe of land at the edge of a large body of water
- Skerry – A small rocky island
- Sound (geography) – A long, relatively wide body of water, connecting two larger bodies of water
- Spit (landform) – A coastal bar or beach landform deposited by longshore drift
- Stack (geology) – A geological landform consisting of a steep and often vertical column or columns of rock in the sea near a coast, formed by wave erosion
- Steep coast – A stretch of coastline where the mainland descends abruptly into the sea.
- Strait – A naturally formed, narrow, typically navigable waterway that connects two larger bodies of water
- Strand plain – A broad belt of sand along a shoreline with a surface exhibiting well-defined parallel or semi-parallel sand ridges separated by shallow swales
- Strandflat – Stretches of coast that have been inundated by the sea by a relative rise in sea levels from either isostacy or eustacy
- Submergent coastline – Stretches of coast that have been inundated by the sea by a relative rise in sea levels from either isostacy or eustacy
- Surge channel – A narrow inlet, usually on a rocky shoreline, and is formed by differential erosion of those rocks by coastal wave action
- Tide pool – A rocky pool on a seashore, separated from the seal at low tide, filled with seawater
- Tombolo – A deposition landform in which an island is connected to the mainland by a sandy isthmus

==== Oceanic (submarine) landforms ====
- List of submarine topographical features –
- Abyssal fan – Underwater geological structures associated with large-scale sediment deposition
- Abyssal hill – A small hill that rises from the floor of an abyssal plain
- Abyssal plain – Flat area on the deep ocean floor
- Aquatic sill – A sea floor barrier of relatively shallow depth restricting water movement between oceanic basins
- Archipelagic apron – A fan-shaped gently sloping region of sea floor found around oceanic islands
- Cold seep – Ocean floor area where hydrogen sulfide, methane and other hydrocarbon-rich fluid seepage occurs
- Continental margin – Zone of the ocean floor that separates the thin oceanic crust from thick continental crust
- Continental rise – An underwater feature connecting the continental slope and the abyssal plain
- Continental shelf – A portion of a continent that is submerged under an area of relatively shallow water known as a shelf sea
- Contourite – A sedimentary deposit commonly formed on continental rise to lower slope settings
- Coral reef – Outcrop of rock in the sea formed by the growth and deposit of stony coral skeletons
- Guyot – An isolated underwater volcanic mountain with a flat top
- Mid-ocean ridge – An underwater mountain system formed by plate tectonic spreading
- Ocean – A body of saline water that composes much of a planet's hydrosphere
- Oceanic basin – Large geologic basins that are below sea level
- Oceanic plateau – Relatively flat submarine region that rises well above the level of the ambient seabed
- Oceanic trench – Long and narrow depressions of the sea floor
- Passive margin – The transition between oceanic and continental lithosphere that is not an active plate margin
- Reef – A bar of rock, sand, coral or similar material, lying beneath the surface of water
- Sandbank represented by Shoal –
- Sea – A large body of salt water surrounded in whole or in part by land
- Seabed – The bottom of the ocean
- Seamount – A mountain rising from the ocean seafloor that does not reach to the water's surface
- Shoal – A natural landform that rises from the bed of a body of water to near the surface and is covered by unconsolidated material
- Submarine canyon – A steep-sided valley cut into the seabed of the continental slope
- Submarine volcano – Underwater vents or fissures in the Earth's surface from which magma can erupt
- Undersea bank represented by Ocean bank – A part of the sea which is shallow compared to its surrounding area
- Undersea mountain range – Mountain ranges that are mostly or entirely under the surface of an ocean.

==== Coastal and oceanic landforms – specific cases – move to another section ====
- Cascadia Channel – An extensive deep-sea channel of the Pacific Ocean.
- Darwin Mounds – A large field of undersea sand mounds off the north west coast of Scotland
- Darwin's Arch – A natural rock arch feature situated to the southeast of Darwin Island in the Pacific Ocean
- Florida Platform – A flat geological feature with the emergent portion forming the Florida peninsula
- Hawaiian Islands – An archipelago in the North Pacific Ocean, currently administered by the US state of Hawaii (archipelago)
- Milwaukee Deep – The deepest part of the Atlantic Ocean – part of the Puerto Rico Trench
- Monterey Canyon – A submarine canyon in Monterey Bay, California
- Northwest Atlantic Mid-Ocean Channel – The main body of a turbidity current system of channels and canyons running on the sea bottom from the Hudson Strait, through the Labrador Sea and ending at the Sohm Abyssal Plain
- Porcupine Seabight – A deep-water oceanic basin on the continental margin of the northeastern Atlantic

=== Oceans ===
Ocean – A body of saline water that composes much of a planet's hydrosphere

- Arctic Ocean – The smallest and shallowest of the world's five major oceans, located in the north polar regions
- Atlantic Ocean – Ocean between Europe, Africa and the Americas
- Indian Ocean – The ocean between Africa, Asia, Australia and Antarctica (or the Southern Ocean)
- Pacific Ocean – Ocean between Asia and Australia in the west, the Americas in the east and Antarctica or the Southern Ocean in the south.
- Southern Ocean – The ocean around Antarctica
- World Ocean – The interconnected system of Earth's oceanic waters

=== Ocean zones ===
Ocean zones – Not mutually exclusive

- Abyssal zone – Deep layer of the ocean between 4000 and 9000 metres
- Aphotic zone – The portion of a lake or ocean where less than 1% of sunlight penetrates (zones)
- Bathyal zone – Part of the pelagic zone that extends from a depth of 1,000 to 4,000 meters (3,300 to 13,100 ft) below the ocean surface.
- Benthic zone – Ecological region at the lowest level of a body of water including the sediment surface and some sub-surface layers
- Dead zone (ecology) – Hypoxic areas in oceans and large lakes caused by excessive nutrient pollution
- Deep ocean water – Cold, salty water deep below the surface of Earth's oceans
- Deep sea – The lowest layer in the ocean, below the thermocline and above the seabed, at a depth of 1,000 fathoms (1,800 m) or more
- Demersal zone – The part of the water column near to the seabed and the benthos
- Fracture zone – A junction between oceanic crustal regions of different ages on the same plate left by a transform fault
- Gas hydrate stability zone – A zone and depth of the marine environment at which methane clathrates naturally exist in the Earth's crust
- Hadal zone – The deepest region of the ocean lying within oceanic trenches
- Intertidal zone – A junction between oceanic crustal regions of different ages on the same plate left by a transform fault
- Littoral zone – Part of a sea, lake or river that is close to the shore
- Mesopelagic zone – The part of the pelagic zone between the photic epipelagic above and the aphotic bathypelagic below
- Neritic zone – The relatively shallow part of the ocean above the drop-off of the continental shelf
- Oceanic zone – The part of the ocean beyond the continental shelf
- Pelagic zone – Sea water that is neither close to the bottom nor near the shore
- Photic zone – The uppermost layer of water in a lake or ocean that is exposed to sunlight more than 1% of surface illumination
- Subduction zone – Convergent tectonic plate boundaries where one plate moves under the other
- Supralittoral zone – The area above the spring high tide line that is regularly splashed, but not submerged by ocean water
- Surf zone – The nearshore zone where wave water comes onto the shore
- Swash – A turbulent layer of water that washes up on the beach after an incoming wave has broken

=== Seas ===
Sea – A large body of salt water surrounded in whole or in part by land

- List of seas – Large divisions of the World Ocean, including areas of water variously named as gulfs, bights, bays, and straits.
- Marginal sea – Large divisions of the World Ocean, partly bordered by land.
- Sargasso Sea – A sea defined by currents in the gyre in the middle of the North Atlantic Ocean

==== Marginal seas of the Atlantic coasts of the Americas (coast wise north to south) ====
- Davis Strait – A northern arm of the Labrador Sea that lies between mid-western Greenland and Nunavut, Canada's Baffin Island
- Labrador Sea – An arm of the North Atlantic Ocean between the Labrador Peninsula and Greenland
- Gulf of St. Lawrence – The outlet of the North American Great Lakes via the Saint Lawrence River into the Atlantic Ocean
- Gulf of Maine – A large gulf of the Atlantic Ocean on the east coast of North America
  - Bay of Fundy – A bay on the east coast of North America between New Brunswick and Nova Scotia
  - Massachusetts Bay – A bay on the Atlantic Ocean that forms part of the central coastline of the Commonwealth of Massachusetts.
  - Cape Cod Bay – A large bay of the Atlantic Ocean adjacent to the U.S. state of Massachusetts
- Nantucket Sound – A roughly triangular area of the Atlantic Ocean offshore from the U.S. state of Massachusetts
- Vineyard Sound – The stretch of the Atlantic Ocean which separates the Elizabeth Islands and the southwestern part of Cape Cod from the island of Martha's Vineyard
- Buzzards Bay – A bay on the coast of Massachusetts, United States
- Narragansett Bay – A bay and estuary on the north side of Rhode Island Sound
- Rhode Island Sound – A strait off the coast of Rhode Island, United States
- Block Island Sound – A strait in the Atlantic Ocean separating Block Island from the coast of mainland Rhode Island in the United States
- Long Island Sound – A tidal estuary on the east coast of the United States
  - Shelter Island Sound – A body of water in Suffolk County, New York, at the eastern end of Long Island
  - Peconic Bay – The parent name for two bays between the North Fork and South Fork of Long Island in the U.S. state of New York
  - Gardiners Bay – A small arm of the Atlantic Ocean in the U.S. state of New York at the eastern end of Long Island
  - Fort Pond Bay – A bay off Long Island Sound at Montauk, New York
- New York Bay – The marine areas surrounding the river mouth of the Hudson River into the Atlantic Ocean
- Jamaica Bay – Bay on the southern side of Long Island, New York
- Raritan Bay – The southern portion of Lower New York Bay between the U.S. states of New York and New Jersey
  - Delaware Bay – The estuary outlet of the Delaware River on the Northeast seaboard of the United States
- Chesapeake Bay – An estuary in the U.S. states of Maryland, Delaware, District of Columbia, and Virginia
- Albemarle Sound – An estuary on the coast of North Carolina, United States
- Pamlico Sound – The largest lagoon along the North American East Coast
- Gulf of Mexico – An ocean basin and marginal sea of the Atlantic Ocean, largely surrounded by the North American continent
  - Florida Bay – The bay between the southern end of the Florida mainland and the Florida Keys in the United States
  - Tampa Bay – Estuary and natural harbor in Florida, off the Gulf of Mexico
  - Pensacola Bay – A bay in the northwestern part of Florida, United States, known as the Florida Panhandle
  - Mobile Bay – An inlet of the Gulf of Mexico, lying within the state of Alabama in the United States
  - Vermillion Bay – An inlet of the Gulf of Mexico, to which it is connected to the south by a narrow strait called Southwest Pass
  - Bay of Campeche – A bight in the southern area of the Gulf of Mexico
- Caribbean – A sea of the Atlantic Ocean bounded by North, Central, and South America
  - Gulf of Gonâve (Haiti) – A large gulf along the western coast of Haiti
  - Gulf of Honduras – A large inlet of the Caribbean Sea, indenting the coasts of Belize, Guatemala, and Honduras.
  - Golfo de los Mosquitos – A gulf on the north coast of Panama, extending from the Valiente Peninsula in Bocas del Toro, past the north coast of Veraguas to the province of Colón, Panama
  - Gulf of Venezuela – A gulf of the Caribbean Sea bounded by the Venezuelan states of Zulia and Falcón and by Guajira Department, Colombia
    - Gulf of Paria – A shallow semi-enclosed inland sea between the island of Trinidad and the east coast of Venezuela
    - Gulf of Darién – The southernmost region of the Caribbean Sea, located north and east of the border between Panama and Colombia
- Argentine Sea – The sea within the continental shelf off the Argentine mainland

==== Marginal seas of the Atlantic coasts of Europe, Africa, and Asia ====
- Norwegian Sea – A marginal sea in the North Atlantic Ocean, northwest of Norway
- North Sea – A marginal sea of the Atlantic Ocean located between the United Kingdom, Denmark, Norway, Germany, the Netherlands, Belgium and France
  - Wadden Sea – An intertidal zone in the southeastern part of the North Sea (Netherlands, Germany and Denmark)
- Baltic Sea – A sea in Northern Europe bounded by the Scandinavian Peninsula, the mainland of Europe, and the Danish islands
  - Archipelago Sea – A part of the Baltic Sea between the Gulf of Bothnia, the Gulf of Finland and the Sea of Åland, within Finnish territorial waters
  - Bothnian Sea – Southern part of the Gulf of Bothnia
  - Central Baltic Sea –
  - Gulf of Riga – A bay of the Baltic Sea between Latvia and Estonia
  - Øresund Strait – The strait between Denmark and Sweden
  - Sea of Åland – The sea between the Finnish Åland islands and the Swedish mainland, part of the Baltic Sea
- English Channel – Arm of the Atlantic Ocean that separates southern England from northern France
- Irish Sea – Sea which separates the islands of Ireland and Great Britain
- Celtic Sea – Part of the Atlantic Ocean south of Ireland, and west of the Bristol Channel, English Channel and Bay of Biscay over the continental shelf
- Bay of Biscay – Gulf of the northeast Atlantic Ocean located south of the Celtic Sea off the west coast of France and the south coast of Spain
  - Cantabrian Sea – Sea in the southern Bay of Biscay off the coast of Spain
- Mediterranean – Sea connected to the Atlantic Ocean between Europe, Africa and Asia
  - Adriatic Sea – Body of water between the Italian Peninsula and the Balkan Peninsula
  - Aegean Sea – Part of the Mediterranean Sea between the Greek and Anatolian peninsulas
    - Argolic Gulf – A gulf of the Aegean Sea off the east coast of the Peloponnese, Greece
    - Myrtoan Sea – Part of the Mediterranean Sea between the Cyclades and the Peleponnese
    - North Euboean Gulf – A gulf of the Aegean Sea that separates the northern part of the island Euboea from the mainland of Central Greece
    - Saronic Gulf – Gulf in the Aegean sea between the peninsulas of Attica and Argolis
    - Sea of Crete – Southern part of the Aegean Sea, north of Crete, east of Kythera, Antikythera, and the Ionian Sea, southeast of the Myrtoan Sea, south of the Cyclades, and west of the Dodecanese islands
    - South Euboean Gulf – A gulf in Central Greece, between the island of Euboea and the Greek mainland
    - Icarian Sea – The part of the Aegean Sea to the south of Chios, to the east of the Eastern Cyclades and west of Anatolia
    - Thermaic Gulf – A gulf in the northwest corner of the Aegean sea
    - Thracian Sea – Northernmost part of the Aegean sea
    - Alboran Sea – The westernmost portion of the Mediterranean Sea, lying between the Iberian Peninsula and the north of Africa
  - Balearic (Catalan) Sea – Part of the Mediterranean Sea near the Balearic Islands
  - Gulf of Lion – A wide embayment of the Mediterranean coastline of Languedoc-Roussillon and Provence in France
  - Gulf of Sirte – A body of water in the Mediterranean Sea on the northern coast of Libya
  - Ionian Sea – Part of the Mediterranean Sea south of the Adriatic Sea
    - Gulf of Corinth – A deep inlet of the Ionian Sea separating the Peloponnese from western mainland Greece
  - Levantine Sea – The easternmost part of the Mediterranean Sea
  - Libyan Sea – The portion of the Mediterranean Sea north of the African coast of ancient Libya
  - Ligurian Sea – Arm of the Mediterranean Sea between the Italian Riviera (Liguria) and the island of Corsica
    - Gulf of Genoa – The northernmost part of the Ligurian Sea
  - Sea of Sardinia – A body of water in the Mediterranean Sea between the Spanish archipelago of Balearic Islands and the Italian island of Sardinia
  - Sea of Sicily – The strait between Sicily and Tunisia
  - Inland Sea, Gozo – A lagoon of seawater on the island of Gozo linked to the Mediterranean Sea through an opening formed by a narrow natural arch
  - Tyrrhenian Sea – Part of the Mediterranean Sea off the western coast of Italy
- Sea of Marmara – Inland sea, entirely within the borders of Turkey, between the Mediterranean Sea and the Black Sea
- Black Sea – Marginal sea of the Atlantic Ocean between Europe and Asia
- Sea of Azov – Sea on the south of Eastern Europe linked to the Black Sea
- Gulf of Guinea – The northeasternmost part of the tropical Atlantic Ocean between Cape Lopez in Gabon, north and west to Cape Palmas in Liberia

==== Marginal seas of the Northern Atlantic islands (east to west) ====
- Irminger Sea – A marginal sea of the North Atlantic Ocean southeast of Greenland between the Denmark Strait and the Labrador Sea
- Denmark Strait – Strait between Greenland and Iceland
- Irish Sea – Sea which separates the islands of Ireland and Great Britain
- Inner Seas off the West Coast of Scotland – A marine area between the Scottish mainland, the Outer Hebrides and Ireland
  - Sea of the Hebrides – A portion of the North Atlantic Ocean, off the coast of western Scotland

==== Marginal seas of the Arctic Ocean (clockwise from 180°) ====
- Chukchi Sea – A marginal sea of the Arctic Ocean north of the Bering Strait
- East Siberian Sea – A marginal sea in the Arctic Ocean north of Siberia
- Laptev Sea – Marginal sea in the Arctic Ocean north of Siberia between the Kara Sea and the East Siberian Sea
- Kara Sea – A marginal sea of the Arctic Ocean north of Siberia between Novaya Zemlya and Severnaya Zemlya
- Barents Sea – A marginal sea of the Arctic Ocean north of Siberia between Novaya Zemlya and Severnaya Zemlya
  - Pechora Sea – A marginal sea at the northwest of Russia, the southeastern part of the Barents Sea
  - White Sea – A marginal sea at the northwest of Russia, the southeastern part of the Barents Sea
- Queen Victoria Sea – A body of water in the Arctic Ocean, stretching from northeast of Svalbard to northwest Franz Josef Land
- Wandel Sea – A body of water in the Arctic Ocean from northeast of Greenland to Svalbard
- Greenland Sea – A body of water in the Arctic Ocean from northeast of Greenland to Svalbard
- Lincoln Sea (recognized by IHO but not IMO) – A part of the Arctic Ocean from Cape Columbia, Canada, in the west to Cape Morris Jesup, Greenland, in the east
- Baffin Bay – A marginal sea between Greenland and Baffin Island, Canada
- Northwest Passage –
  - Prince Gustaf Adolf Sea – A marginal sea of the Arctic Ocean located in Qikiqtaaluk Region, Nunavut, Canada
  - Amundsen Gulf – A gulf in Northwest Territories, Canada
  - (more to be listed)
- Hudson Strait – Strait connecting the Atlantic Ocean to Hudson Bay in Canada
- Hudson Bay – A large body of saltwater in northeastern Canada that drains much of north-central North America
  - James Bay – A bay on the southern end of the Hudson Bay, Canada
- Beaufort Sea – A marginal sea of the Arctic Ocean north of the Northwest Territories, the Yukon, and Alaska

==== Marginal seas of the Indian Ocean ====
- Andaman Sea – A marginal sea of the eastern Indian Ocean between the Andaman and Nicobar Islands to the west and Myanmar, Thailand, and the Malay Peninsula to the east
  - Gulf of Martaban – An arm of the Andaman Sea in the southern part of Burma
- Arabian Sea – A marginal sea of the northern Indian Ocean between the Arabian Peninsula and India
- Bay of Bengal – Northeastern part of the Indian Ocean between India and the Andaman and Nicobar Islands
- Gulf of Aden – A gulf between Somalia and Djibouti in Africa and Yemen in the Arabian Peninsula
- Gulf of Oman – Strait that connects the Arabian Sea with the Strait of Hormuz
- Laccadive Sea – A body of water bordering India, the Maldives, and Sri Lanka.
- Mozambique Channel – Indian Ocean strait between Madagascar and Mozambique
- Persian Gulf – An arm of the Indian Ocean in western Asia
- Red Sea – Arm of the Indian Ocean between Arabia and Africa
- Timor Sea – A sea bounded to the north by the island of Timor, to the east by the Arafura Sea, to the south by Australia

==== Marginal seas of the Pacific coast of the Americas ====
- Bering Sea – Marginal sea of the Pacific Ocean off the coast of Alaska, Eastern Russia and the Aleutian Islands
- Chilean Sea – The portion of the Pacific Ocean lying west of the Chilean mainland
- Sea of Chiloé – A marginal sea of the coast of Chile that is separated from the Pacific Ocean by Chiloé Island
- Gulf of Alaska – An arm of the Pacific Ocean south of Alaska, from the Alaska Peninsula and Kodiak Island in the west to the Alexander Archipelago in the east
- Gulf of California (also known as the Sea of Cortés) – A gulf of the Pacific Ocean on the coast of Mexico between Baja California and the mainland
- Mar de Grau – The body of water in the Pacific Ocean under the control of the South American country of Peru.
- Salish Sea – A group of coastal waterways in southwest British Columbia and northwest Washington State

==== Marginal seas of the Pacific coasts of Asia and Oceania ====
- Arafura Sea – Marginal sea between Australia and Indonesian New Guinea
- Bali Sea – The body of water north of the island of Bali and south of Kangean Island in Indonesia
- Banda Sea – A sea between Sulawesi and Maluku
- Bismarck Sea – Marginal sea in the southwestern Pacific Ocean northeast of the island of New Guinea and south of the Bismarck Archipelago and the Admiralty Islands
- Bohai Sea – The innermost gulf of the Yellow Sea and Korea Bay on the coast of Northeastern and North China
- Bohol Sea (also known as the Mindanao Sea) – Marginal sea between the Visayas and Mindanao in the Philippines
- Camotes Sea – A small sea in the Philippine archipelago, bordered by the islands Leyte, Bohol and Cebu
- Celebes Sea – A marginal sea of the Pacific Ocean between the Sulu Archipelago, Mindanao Island, the Sangihe Islands, Sulawesi and Kalimantan
- Ceram Sea – One of several small seas between the scattered islands of Indonesia
- Coral Sea – A marginal sea of the South Pacific off the northeast coast of Australia
- East China Sea – A marginal sea of the Pacific Ocean between the south of Korea, the south of Kyushu, Japan, the Ryukyu islands and mainland China
- Flores Sea – A marginal sea in Indonesia between Sulawesi and the Sunda Islands of Flores and Sumbawa
- Gulf of Carpentaria – A large, shallow sea enclosed on three sides by northern Australia and bounded on the north by the Arafura Sea
- Gulf of Thailand – A shallow inlet in the western part of the South China and Eastern Archipelagic Seas
- Halmahera Sea – A marginal sea in the central eastern part of the Australasian Mediterranean Sea
- Java Sea – A marginal sea located between Java and Kalimantan, in Indonesia
- Koro Sea – A sea in the Pacific Ocean between Viti Levu island, Fiji to the west and the Lau Islands to the east
- Molucca Sea – A marginal sea bordered by the Indonesian Islands of Sulawesi to the west, Halmahera to the east, and the Sula Islands to the south
- Philippine Sea – A marginal sea bordered by the Indonesian Islands of Sulawesi to the west, Halmahera to the east, and the Sula Islands to the south
- Savu Sea – A small sea within Indonesia between the islands Savu, Rai Jua, Rote, Timor and Sumba
- Sea of Japan – Marginal sea between Japan, Russia and Korea
- Sea of Okhotsk – A marginal sea of the western Pacific Ocean, between the Kamchatka Peninsula, the Kuril Islands, the island of Hokkaido, the island of Sakhalin, and eastern Siberian coast
- Seto Inland Sea – A marginal sea between Honshū, Shikoku, and Kyūshū
- Sibuyan Sea – A small sea in the Philippines that separates the Visayas from the northern Philippine island of Luzon
- Solomon Sea – A sea in the Pacific Ocean between Papua New Guinea and the Solomon Islands
- South China Sea – A marginal sea of the Pacific Ocean from the Karimata and Malacca Straits to the Strait of Taiwan
- Sulu Sea – A sea in the Philippines between Palawan, the Sulu Archipelago, Borneo and Visayas
- Tasman Sea – A marginal sea of the South Pacific between Australia and New Zealand
- Visayan Sea – A sea in the Philippines between Masbate, Leyte, Cebu, Negros and Panay
- Yellow Sea – Sea in Northeast Asia between China and Korea

==== Marginal seas of the Southern Ocean ====
- Amundsen Sea – An arm of the Southern Ocean off Marie Byrd Land in western Antarctica between Cape Flying Fish to the east and Cape Dart on Siple Island to the west
- Bass Strait – Sea strait between the Australian mainland and Tasmania
- Bellingshausen Sea – A part of the Southern Ocean along the west side of the Antarctic Peninsula, west of Alexander Island, east of Cape Flying Fish on Thurston Island
- Cooperation Sea – A proposed sea name for part of the Southern Ocean, between Enderby Land and West Ice Shelf
- Cosmonauts Sea – A proposed name for part of the Southern Ocean, off the Prince Olav Coast and Enderby Land, Antarctica, between about 30°E and 50°E
- Davis Sea – A marginal sea along the coast of East Antarctica between West Ice Shelf and Shackleton Ice Shelf
- D'Urville Sea – A marginal sea of the Southern Ocean, north of the coast of Adélie Land, East Antarctica
- Drake Passage – body of water between South America and the South Shetland Islands of Antarctica
- Great Australian Bight – Oceanic bight off the central and western portions of the southern coastline of mainland Australia
- Gulf St Vincent – A large inlet of water on the southern coast of South Australia between the Yorke Peninsula and the Fleurieu Peninsula
- Investigator Strait – A body of water in South Australia lying between the Yorke Peninsula, on the Australian mainland, and Kangaroo Island
- King Haakon VII Sea – A proposed name for part of the Southern Ocean on the coast of East Antarctica
- Lazarev Sea – A proposed name for a marginal sea of the Southern Ocean
- Mawson Sea – A proposed sea name along the Queen Mary Land coast of East Antarctica east of the Shackleton Ice Shelf
- Riiser-Larsen Sea – One of the marginal seas in the Southern Ocean off East Antarctica and south of the Indian Ocean
- Ross Sea – A deep bay of the Southern Ocean in Antarctica
- Scotia Sea – A sea at the northern edge of the Southern Ocean at its boundary with the South Atlantic Ocean. It is bounded on the west by the Drake Passage and on the north, east, and south by the Scotia Arc
- Somov Sea – A proposed name for part of the Southern Ocean north of Oates Coast, Victoria Land, and of George V Coast of East Antarctica
- Spencer Gulf – A large inlet in South Australia between the Eyre Peninsula and the Yorke Peninsula
- Weddell Sea – Part of the Southern Ocean between Coats Land and the Antarctic Peninsula

=== Sea ice ===
Sea ice – Ice formed from frozen seawater

- Antarctic sea ice – Records made for navigational safety and environmental monitoring
- Arctic ice pack – The sea ice cover of the Arctic Ocean and its vicinity
- Arctic sea ice decline – The sea ice loss observed in recent decades in the Arctic Ocean
- Arctic sea ice ecology and history –
- Blue iceberg – An iceberg with a blue colour, often due to very low air content
- Brine rejection – Process by which salts are expelled from freezing water
- Brinicle – A downward growing hollow tube of ice enclosing a plume of descending brine that is formed beneath developing sea ice
- Climate change adaptation in Greenland –
- Climate change in the Arctic – The effects of global warming in the Arctic
- Congelation ice – Ice that forms on the bottom of an established ice cover
- Drift ice – Sea ice that is not attached to land and may move on the sea surface in response to wind and ocean currents
- Drift station – A temporary or semi-permanent facility built on an ice floe
- Drifting ice station – Research stations built on the ice of the high latitudes of the Arctic Ocean
- Fast ice – Sea ice that is connected to the coastline, to the sea floor along shoals or to grounded icebergs
- Finger rafting – Compression overlapping of floating ice cover in alternating overthrusts and underthrusts
- Finnish-Swedish ice class – An ice class assigned to a vessel operating in first-year ice in the Baltic Sea
- Flaw lead – A waterway opening between pack ice and fast ice
- Frazil ice – A collection of loose, randomly oriented, plate or discoid ice crystals formed in supercooled turbulent water
- Grease ice – A thin, soupy layer of frazil crystals clumped together, which makes the ocean surface resemble an oil slick
- Iceberg – A large piece of freshwater ice broken off a glacier or ice shelf and floating in open water
- Ice bridge – A frozen natural structure formed over seas, bays, rivers or lake surfaces
- Ice class – A notation assigned by a classification society or a national authority to denote the additional level of strengthening and other arrangements that enable a ship to navigate through sea ice
- Ice floe – A large pack of floating ice
- Ice mélange – A mixture of sea ice types, icebergs, and snow without a clearly defined floe
- Ice pier – A man-made structure used to assist the unloading of ships in Antarctica
- Ice rafting – The transport of various materials by drifting ice
- Ice volcano – A conical mound of ice formed over a terrestrial lake via the eruption of water and slush through an ice shelf
- Lead (sea ice) – A large fracture in sea ice creating a navigable waterway
- Measurement of sea ice – Records made for navigational safety and environmental monitoring
- Melt pond – Pools of open water that form on sea ice in the warmer months of spring and summer
- Nilas –
- Pancake ice – A form of ice that consists of round pieces of ice with diameters ranging from 30 centimetres (12 inches) to 3 metres
- Polar Class – The ice class assigned to a ship by a classification society based on the Unified Requirements for Polar Class Ships
- Polar seas – A collective term for the Arctic Ocean and the southern part of the Southern Ocean
- Polynya – An area of unfrozen sea within the ice pack
- Pressure ridge (ice) – A ridge formed in pack ice by accumulation of ice blocks in the convergence between floes
- Seabed gouging by ice – A process that occurs when floating ice features drift into shallower areas and their bottom comes into contact with and drags along a softer seabed
- Sea ice concentration – The area of sea ice relative to the total area at a given point in the ocean
- Sea ice emissivity modelling –
- Sea ice growth processes –
- Sea ice microbial communities – Groups of microorganisms living within and at the interfaces of sea ice
- Sea ice thickness –
- Stamukha – A grounded pressure ridge that typically develops along the boundary between fast ice and the drifting pack ice
- Strudel (ice) – A vertical hole in sea ice through which downward jet-like, buoyancy-driven drainage of flood water is thought to occur
- Zhubov scale – A scale for reporting polar sea ice coverage

==== Icebergs ====
Iceberg – A large piece of freshwater ice broken off a glacier or ice shelf and floating in open water

- List of recorded icebergs by area –
- Fletcher's Ice Island – A thick, tabular iceberg discovered by U.S. Air Force Colonel Joseph O. Fletcher, used as a manned scientific station in the Arctic for several years
- Iceberg A-38 – A large iceberg that split from the Filchner-Ronne Ice Shelf in Antarctica in 1998
- Iceberg A-68 – Antarctic iceberg from the Larsen C Ice Shelf in July 2017
- Iceberg B-9 – Antarctic iceberg that calved in 1987
- Iceberg B-15 – Largest recorded iceberg. Calved from the Ross Ice Shelf of Antarctica in March 2000
- Iceberg B-17B – Antarctic iceberg that calved off the Ross Ice Shelf in 1999.
- Iceberg B-31 – Antarctic iceberg calved from the Pine Island Glacier in 2013
- Iceberg C-19 – Iceberg that calved from the Ross Ice Shelf in May 2002
- Iceberg D-16 – Antarctic iceberg calved from the Fimbul Ice Shelf in 2006

=== Sea level ===
Sea level – Average level for the surface of the ocean at any given geographical position on the planetary surface

- Eustatic sea level – The distance from the center of the Earth to the sea surface
- Global Sea Level Observing System – An Intergovernmental Oceanographic Commission program to measure sea level globally for long-term climate change studies
- Meltwater pulse 1A – A period of rapid post-glacial sea level rise
- Meltwater pulse 1B – A period of either rapid or just accelerated post-glacial sea level rise
- National Tidal and Sea Level Facility – Organisation responsible for monitoring sea levels in the UK
- North West Shelf Operational Oceanographic System – Facility that monitors physical, sedimentological and ecological variables for the North Sea area
- Past sea level – Sea level variations over geological time scales
- Permanent Service for Mean Sea Level – A repository for tide gauge data used in the measurement of long-term sea level change
- Sea level rise – The current trend for sea levels to rise over the long term
- Sea-level curve – The graphic representation of changes of sea level through geological history
- UK National Tide Gauge Network – Part of the National Tidal and Sea Level Facility

=== Tides ===
Tide – The periodic change of sea levels caused by the gravitational and inertial effects of the Moon, the Sun and the rotation of the Earth

- Amphidromic point – A point of zero amplitude of one harmonic constituent of the tide
- Amsterdam Ordnance Datum – A vertical datum in use in large parts of Western Europe, originally created for use in the Netherlands
- Chart datum – The level of water from which depths displayed on a nautical chart are measured
- Discourse on the Tides – An essay by Galileo Galilei in 1616 that attempted to explain the motion of Earth's tides as a consequence of Earth's rotation and revolution around the sun
- Dory Rips – Extreme tidal agitation of waters in the Bay of Fundy off the headland of Cape d'Or in Nova Scotia, Canada.
- Earth tide – Displacement of the solid earth's surface caused by the gravity of the Moon and Sun
- Head of tide – The farthest point upstream where a river is affected by tidal fluctuations
- Horizontal Falls – A tidal phenomenon in Western Australia where the tide rises and falls faster on one side of a gap than the other, creating a waterfall up to 5m high on a spring tide
- Internal tide – Internal waves at a tidal frequency generated as surface tides move stratified water up and down a slope
- Intertidal zone – The area of coast between low and high tide marks
- Jack Sound – A body of water between the island of Skomer and the Pembrokeshire mainland with a strong tidal race
- King tide – A colloquial term for an especially high spring tide, such as a perigean spring tide.
- Long period tide – Gravitational tides, typically with amplitudes of a few centimetres or less and periods longer than one day, generated by changes in the Earth's orientation relative to the Sun, Moon, and Jupiter
- Lunitidal interval – The time lag from the Moon passing overhead, to the next high or low tide.
- Perigean spring tide – A tide that occurs three or four times per year when the Moon's perigee coincides with a spring tide
- Rip tide – A strong, offshore current that is caused by the tide pulling water through an inlet along a barrier beach, at a lagoon or inland marina where tide water flows steadily out to sea during ebb tide
- Rule of twelfths – An approximation to a sine curve used as a rule of thumb for estimating a changing quantity where both the quantity and the steps are easily divisible by 12
- Slack water – A short period in a body of tidal water when the water is completely unstressed, and there is no movement either way in the tidal stream, and which occurs before the direction of the tidal stream reverses
- Storm surge Rise of water surface associated with a low pressure weather system
- Theory of tides – The science of interpretation and prediction of deformations of astronomical bodies and their atmospheres and oceans under the gravitational loading of other astronomical bodies
- Tidal atlas – A graphical representation of the geographical distribution of the strength and direction of tidal currents at intervals during the tidal cycle
- Tidal bore – A hydrodynamic phenomenon in which the leading edge of the incoming tide forms a wave (or waves) of water that travels up a river or narrow bay against the direction of the river or bay's current.
- Tidal diamond – Symbols on British admiralty charts that indicate the direction and speed of tidal streams
- Tidal flooding – The temporary inundation of low-lying areas during exceptionally high tide events
- Tidal island – Land which is connected to the mainland by a causeway which is covered by high tide and exposed at low tide
- Tidal power – Technology to convert the energy from tides into useful forms of power
- Tidal prism – The volume of water in an estuary or inlet between mean high tide and mean low tide,
- Tidal race – A fast-moving tidal flow passing through a constriction, forming waves, eddies and strong currents
- Tidal range – The vertical difference between the high tide and the succeeding low tide
- Tidal resonance – Phenomenon that occurs when the tide excites a resonant mode of a part of an ocean, producing a higher tidal range
- Tidal river – River where flow and level are influenced by tides
- Tidal triggering of earthquakes – The idea that tidal forces may induce seismicity
- Tide gauge – A device for measuring the change in sea level relative to a datum
- Tideline – Surface border where two currents in the ocean converge. Driftwood, floating seaweed, foam, and other floating debris may accumulate
- Tide pool – A rocky pool on a seashore, separated from the sea at low tide, filled with seawater
- Tide-predicting machine – A mechanical analogue computer, constructed and set up to predict the ebb and flow of sea tides and the variations in their heights
- Tide-Predicting Machine No. 2 – A special-purpose mechanical analogue computer used by the U.S. Coast and Geodetic Survey to compute the height and time of high and low tides for specific locations
- Tide table – Tabulated data used for tidal prediction which show the daily times and heights of high water and low water, usually for a particular location
- Tombolo – A deposition landform in which an island is connected to the mainland by a sandy isthmus
- Vanishing island – Any permanent island which is exposed at low tide but is submersed at high tide
- Vertical Offshore Reference Frames (VORF) – is a set of high resolution surfaces which together define the vertical datum for hydrographic surveying and charting in the United Kingdom and Ireland
- Whirlpool – Body of rotating water produced by the meeting of opposing currents

==== Storm tides ====
Storm surge Rise of water surface associated with a low pressure weather system

- Storm tides of the North Sea – Tides in the North Sea with abnormally high flood period caused by storms
  - 1978 North Sea storm surge – A storm surge which occurred over 11–12 January causing extensive coastal flooding and considerable damage on the east coast of England between the Humber and Kent
  - Burchardi flood – A storm tide that struck the North Sea coast of North Frisia and Dithmarschen on the night between 11 and 12 October 1634
  - Christmas Flood of 1717 – December 1717 North Sea storm
  - Cyclone Berit – A very strong European windstorm in mid-November 2011
  - Cyclone Xaver – A winter storm that affected northern Europe in 2013
  - Cymbrian flood – A legendary large-scale incursion of the sea in the region of the Jutland peninsula in the period 120 to 114 BC, resulting in a permanent alteration of the coastline with much land lost
  - February flood of 1825 – Storm surge flood on the North Sea coast of Germany and the Netherlands
  - Gale of January 1976 – An extratropical cyclone and storm surge which occurred over January 1976
  - North Sea flood of 1953 – Late January-early February 1953 North sea flood storm
  - North Sea flood of 1962 – A natural disaster affecting mainly the coastal regions of Germany
  - North Sea flood of 2007 – A European windstorm which affected northern and western Europe in early November 2007
  - St. Elizabeth's flood (1404) – A flood on the coast of the North Sea
  - St. Elizabeth's flood (1421) – A flooding of the Grote Hollandse Waard, an area in what is now the Netherlands
  - Saint Marcellus's flood – A storm surge in the North Sea 1362
  - St. Peter's flood – Two separate storm tides that struck the coasts of Netherlands and Northern Germany in 1651
  - South England flood of February 1287 – A storm and storm surge that hit the southern coast of England with such ferocity that whole areas of coastline were redrawn
  - St. Lucia's flood – A storm tide that affected the Netherlands and Northern Germany on 14 December 1287
  - 1928 Thames flood – A storm tide that affected the Netherlands and Northern Germany on 14 December 1287

==== Tidal bores ====
Tidal bore – A hydrodynamic phenomenon in which the leading edge of the incoming tide forms a wave (or waves) of water that travels up a river or narrow bay against the direction of the river or bay's current.

- Arnside Bore – A tidal bore on the estuary of the River Kent in England
- Mearim River – A river in Maranhão state of northern Brazil with a tidal bore
- Petitcodiac River – A river in south-eastern New Brunswick, Canada
- Pororoca – A tidal bore, with waves up to 4 metres high that travel as much as 800 km inland upstream on the Amazon River and adjacent rivers
- Qiantang River – An East Chinese river that originates in the border region of Anhui and Jiangxi provinces and has the world's largest tidal bore
- Severn bore – A tidal bore seen on the tidal reaches of the River Severn in south western England
- Sri Aman – Town in east Malaysia on the Batang Lupar River, known for its daily tidal bore
- Trent Aegir – A tidal bore on the River Trent in England

==== Tidal islands ====
Tidal island – Land which is connected to the mainland by a causeway which is covered by high tide and exposed at low tide

- Ap Lei Pai – An uninhabited island in Hong Kong, linked to the south of Ap Lei Chau by a tombolo
- Elizabeth Castle – A castle on a tidal island in the parish of Saint Helier, Jersey
- La Motte, Jersey – A tidal island and listed archaeological site in Jersey
- Lihou – A small tidal island, on the west coast of Guernsey, Channel Islands
- Ma Shi Chau – A tidal island of Hong Kong
- Mandø – Danish Wadden Sea island
- Moturoa / Rabbit Island – A small island in the southernmost part of the Tasman Bay, in the northern coast of New Zealand's South Island
- Naaz islands – Two tidal islands in the Persian gulf, on the shore of Qeshm island
- Penguin Island (Western Australia) – A tidal island near Perth, Western Australia
- Îlot Saint-Michel – An uninhabited island in the English Channel off the coast of Brittany in Côtes-d'Armor, France

===== Tidal islands of Canada =====
- Micou's Island, Nova Scotia – A tidal island in the Glen Haven community near the eastern shore of St. Margarets Bay, Nova Scotia, Canada
- Ministers Island – Canadian tidal island in New Brunswick's Passamaquoddy Bay near the town of St. Andrews
- Sandy Point, Newfoundland and Labrador – Tidal island on the west coast of Newfoundland
- Wedge Island (Nova Scotia) – A tidal island near Liscomb, Nova Scotia.

===== Tidal islands of France =====
- Grand Bé – Tidal island near Saint-Malo in Ille-et-Vilaine, France
- Petit Bé – A tidal island near Saint-Malo in Ille-et-Vilaine, France
- Fort de Bertheaume – A fort in Plougonvelin, in the Department of Finistère, France. It is located on a tidal island
- Fort Louvois – Fortification built on a tidal island in Bourcefranc-le-Chapus in the department of Charente-Maritime, France
- Fort National – A fort on a tidal island a few hundred metres off the walled city of Saint-Malo
- Mont Saint-Michel – An island and mainland commune in Normandy, France
- Noirmoutier – An island off the coast of France in the Vendée department.
- Tatihou – Tidal island of Normandy in France
- Tombelaine – A small tidal island in Manche, France
- Tristan Island – Tidal island in Finistère, France

===== Tidal islands of Germany =====
- Langeneß –
- Nordstrandischmoor – A hallig in the Wadden Sea – a tidal island
- Öland (Frisian island) –

===== Tidal islands of Ireland =====
- Coney Island, County Sligo – Tidal island in County Sligo, Ireland
- Inishkeel –
- Omey Island – A tidal island situated near Claddaghduff on the western edge of Connemara in County Galway, Ireland

===== Tidal islands of England =====
- Asparagus Island – A small tidal island on the eastern side of Mount's Bay, within the parish of Mullion, Cornwall
- Burgh Island – A tidal island on the coast of South Devon in England
- Burrow Island – A tidal island in Gosport overlooking Portsmouth
- Chiswick Eyot – Tidal island in the River Thames
- Dova Haw – A small tidal island off the coast of Cumbria, England
- Gugh – Tidal island of the isles of Scilly
- Headin Haw – A small tidal island off the coast of Cumbria, England
- Hilbre Islands – Three tidal islands at the mouth of the estuary of the River Dee, England
- Horsey Island – Tidal island in Essex, England
- Lindisfarne – Tidal island in North East England
- Mersea Island – A tidal island in Essex, England
- Northey Island – Tidal island in the estuary of the River Blackwater, Essex
- Osea Island – Tidal island in the estuary of the River Blackwater, Essex, East England
- Piel Island – Tidal island in Cumbria, England
- St Michael's Mount – Tidal island, church, castle, and civil parish in Cornwall, England
- St Mary's Island (Tyne and Wear) – Tidal island in North Tynside, Tyne and Wear, England

===== Tidal islands of Scotland =====
- Baleshare – A flat tidal island in the Outer Hebrides of Scotland
- Bernera, Lismore – A tidal island off Lismore, in Argyll, Scotland
- Black Holm – A small tidal island in the Orkney Islands, near Copinsay to the west of Corn Hol
- Brei Holm – A tiny tidal islet in the western Shetland Islands
- Brough of Birsay – An uninhabited tidal island off the north-west coast of The Mainland of Orkney, Scotland
- Calbha Mor – A tidal islet in Eddrachillis Bay, Sutherland, Scotland.
- Calve Island – An uninhabited island on the east coast of the Isle of Mull in Argyll and Bute on the west coast of Scotland
- Ceann Ear – The largest island in the Monach or Heisgeir group off North Uist in north west Scotland
- Ceann Iar – A tidal island in the Monach Isles, to the west of North Uist in the Outer Hebrides
- Corn Holm – A small tidal island in Orkney, near Copinsay
- Cramond Island – A tidal island in the Firth of Forth in eastern Scotland
- Island of Danna – An inhabited tidal island in Argyll and Bute
- Island Davaar – A tidal island at the mouth of Campbeltown Loch off the east coast of Kintyre, in Argyll and Bute, Scotland.
- Eilean Mòr, Loch Sunart – An uninhabited, tidal island opposite Oronsay at the entrance to Loch Sunart on the west coast of Scotland
- Eilean na Cille – An island of the Outer Hebrides connected to Grimsay (South) by a causeway
- Eilean Shona – A tidal island in Loch Moidart, Scotland
- Eileanan Chearabhaigh – A group of small uninhabited tidal islands off the south east coast of Benbecula in the Outer Hebrides of Scotland
- Eriska – A flat tidal island at the entrance to Loch Creran on the west coast of Scotland
- Erraid – A tidal island to the west of Mull in the Inner Hebrides of Scotland.
- Grimsay – A tidal island in the Outer Hebrides of Scotland
- Grimsay (South East Benbecula) – A tidal island of the Outer Hebrides south east of Benbecula
- Helliar Holm – An uninhabited tidal island off the coast of Shapinsay in the Orkney Islands, Scotland
- Hestan Island – A small tidal island in the Solway Firth, Southwest Scotland
- Huney – An uninhabited tidal island due east of the island of Unst in the Shetland Islands, Scotland
- Inner Holm – A small inhabited tidal island in Stromness harbour and one of the Orkney islands of Scotland
- Islands of Fleet – A group of small islands in Galloway, Scotland. Ardwall and Barlocco are tidal islands
- Isle Ristol – The innermost of the Summer Isles in Scotland,
- Kili Holm – A tidal island in the Orkney Islands, linked to Egilsay
- Lampay – An uninhabited tidal island in Loch Dunvegan, off the northwest coast of the Isle of Skye in Scotland
- Oldany Island – Tidal island in Assynt, Sutherland, north-west Scotland
- Oronsay, Inner Hebrides – A small tidal island south of Colonsay in the Scottish Inner Hebrides
- Oronsay, Loch Bracadale – An uninhabited tidal island in Loch Bracadale on the west coast of Skye, Scotland
- Rough Island, Scotland – Tidal island in the Rough Firth off the Solway Firth in Scotland
- Sanday, Inner Hebrides – A tidal island of the Small Isles, in the Scottish Inner Hebrides
- Sibhinis – A tidal island of the Monach Islands, lying between Ceann Iar and Ceann Ear
- Soay Beag – A small, uninhabited tidal island in West Loch Tarbert, between the northern and southern parts of Harris
- Castle Stalker – Tower house on a tidal islet on Loch Laich, Argyll, Scotland
- Stromay – A tidal island off North Uist in the Sound of Harris, Scotland
- Torsa – A tidal island off North Uist in the Sound of Harris, Scotland
- Uyea, Northmavine – An uninhabited tidal island located to the northwest of Mainland, Shetland
- Vallay – An uninhabited tidal island in the Scottish Outer Hebrides
- West Head of Papa – A small tidal island off Papa in Shetland, one of the Scalloway Islands

===== Tidal islands of Northern Ireland =====
- Nendrum Monastery – Christian monastery on Mahee Island in Strangford Lough, County Down, Northern Ireland

===== Tidal islands of Wales =====
- Burry Holms – A small tidal island at the northern end of the Gower Peninsula, Wales
- Cribinau – A small tidal island off the south west coast of the isle of Anglesey in Wales between Porth China and Porth Cwyfan
- Gateholm – A small tidal island off the south west coast of Pembrokeshire in the south west side of Wales
- Mumbles Head – a headland sited on the western edge of Swansea Bay on the southern coast of Wales
- St Catherine's Island – A small tidal island linked to Tenby in Pembrokeshire, Wales
- Sully Island – A small tidal island off the northern coast of the Bristol Channel near Cardiff
- Ynys Cantwr – A small tidal island south of Ramsey Island, Pembrokeshire, Wales
- Ynys Feurig – A set of three small inter-connected low-lying inshore tidal rocky islets off the west coast of Anglesey, North Wales
- Ynys Gifftan – A tidal island near the south east shore of Traeth Bach, the Dwyryd estuary near Portmeirion in Gwynedd, north Wales
- Ynys Gwelltog – A small tidal island south of Ramsey Island, Pembrokeshire, Wales
- Ynys Llanddwyn – A small tidal island off the west coast of Anglesey, northwest Wales
- Ynys Lochtyn – A tiny tidal island on the coast of Cardigan Bay, Wales near the village of Llangrannog in the county Ceredigion

===== Tidal islands of the United States =====
- Bar Island – A tidal island across from Bar Harbor on Mount Desert Island, Maine, United States
- Bumpkin Island – Tidal island in Massachusetts, United States of America
- Charles Island – Tidal island off the coast of Milford, Connecticut, in Long Island Sound
- Douglas Island – A tidal island in Alaska, just west of downtown Juneau and east of Admiralty Island
- High Island (Bronx) – A small tidal island, part of The Pelham Islands group in the New York City borough of the Bronx
- Sears Island – A tidal island off the coast of Searsport in Waldo County, Maine at the top of Penobscot Bay

==== Whirlpools ====
Whirlpool – Body of rotating water produced by the meeting of opposing currents

- Charybdis – Whirlpool in the Strait of Messina named for a figure in Greek mythology
- Gulf of Corryvreckan – A narrow strait between the islands of Jura and Scarba off the west coast of Scotland with an intense tidal race
- Moskstraumen – A system of tidal eddies and whirlpools that forms at the Lofoten archipelago, Norway
- Naruto whirlpools – Tidal whirlpools in the Naruto Strait in Hyōgo, Japan
- Niagara Whirlpool – A natural whirlpool in the Niagara Gorge, downstream from Niagara Falls
- Old Sow whirlpool – The largest tidal whirlpool in the Western Hemisphere, located off the southwestern shore of Deer Island, New Brunswick, Canada
- Saltstraumen – A small sea strait in Norway with one of the strongest tidal currents in the world
- Skookumchuck Narrows – A strait forming the entrance of Sechelt Inlet on British Columbia's Sunshine Coast in Canada

=== Waves ===
Gravity wave – Wave generated in a fluid medium or at the interface between two media when the force of gravity or buoyancy tries to restore equilibrium

- ADCIRC – A high-performance, cross-platform numerical ocean circulation model
- Airy wave theory – A linearised description of the propagation of gravity waves on the surface of a homogeneous fluid layer
- Artificial wave – Man-made waves usually created on a specially designed surface or in a pool
- Ballantine scale – A biologically defined scale for measuring the degree of exposure level of wave action on a rocky shore
- Bow wave – The wave that forms at the bow of a ship when it moves through the water
- Boussinesq approximation (water waves) – An approximation valid for weakly non-linear and fairly long waves
- Breaking wave – A wave that becomes unstable as a consequence of excessive steepness
- Capillary wave – Wave traveling along the phase boundary of a fluid, whose dynamics and phase velocity are dominated by the effects of surface tension
- Clapotis – A non-breaking standing wave pattern
- Cnoidal wave – A nonlinear and exact periodic wave solution of the Korteweg–de Vries equation
- Coriolis–Stokes force – A forcing of the mean flow in a rotating fluid due to interaction of the Coriolis effect and wave-induced Stokes drift
- Craik–Leibovich vortex force – A forcing of the mean flow through wave–current interaction
- Cross sea – A sea state with two wave systems traveling at oblique angles
- Dispersion (water waves) – Generally refers to frequency dispersion, which means that waves of different wavelengths travel at different phase speeds
- Douglas sea scale – A scale to estimate the roughness of the sea for navigation
- Draupner wave – A rogue wave which hit the Draupner platform in the North Sea on 1 January 1995
- Edge wave – A surface gravity wave fixed by refraction against a rigid boundary, often a shoaling beach
- Energy cascade – The transfer of energy between large and small scales of motion
- Equatorial Rossby wave – Very long, low frequency waves found near the equator
- Equatorial waves – Ocean waves trapped close to the equator
- Fetch (geography) – The length of water over which a given wind has blown
- Following sea – A wave direction that matches the heading of a vessel
- Green's law – The evolution of non-breaking surface gravity waves propagating in shallow water of gradually varying depth and width
- Hull speed – The speed at which the wavelength of a vessel's bow wave is equal to the waterline length
- Hundred-year wave – A statistically projected water wave, the height of which, on average, is met or exceeded once in a hundred years for a given location
- Infragravity wave – Surface gravity waves with frequencies lower than the wind waves
- Internal wave – Gravity waves that oscillate within a fluid medium with density variation with depth, rather than on the surface
- Iribarren number – A dimensionless parameter used to model several effects of breaking surface gravity waves on beaches and coastal structures.
- Kelvin wave – A wave in the ocean or atmosphere that balances Coriolis force against a topographic boundary such as a coastline
- Keulegan–Carpenter number – A dimensionless quantity describing the relative importance of drag and inertia forces for bluff objects in an oscillatory fluid flow
- Langmuir turbulence – A turbulent flow with coherent Langmuir circulation structures that exist and evolve over a range of spatial and temporal scales
- List of rogue waves incidents – Incidents of known and likely rogue waves
- List of waves named after people –
- Kinematic wave –
- Longshore drift – Sediment moved by the longshore current
- Luke's variational principle – A mathematical description of the motion of surface waves on a fluid with a free surface, under the action of gravity.
- Megatsunami – A very large wave created by a large, sudden displacement of material into a body of water
- Meteotsunami – A tsunami-like wave of meteorological origin
- Mild-slope equation – The combined effects of diffraction and refraction for water waves propagating over variable depth and with lateral boundaries
- Modulational instability, also known as Benjamin–Feir instability – A phenomenon whereby deviations from a periodic waveform are reinforced by nonlinearity
- Morison equation – a semi-empirical equation for the inline force on a body in oscillatory flow
- Ocean dynamics – The description of the motion of water in the oceans
- Peregrine soliton – An analytic solution of the nonlinear Schrödinger equation
- Radiation stress – The depth-integrated excess momentum flux caused by the presence of the surface gravity waves, which is exerted on the mean flow
- Rogue wave – Relatively large and spontaneous ocean surface waves that occur at sea
- Rossby wave – A type of inertial wave in the atmospheres and oceans of planets that largely owe their properties to rotation of the planet
- Rossby-gravity waves – Equatorially trapped waves that carry energy eastwards
- Sea state – The general condition of the free surface on a large body of water
- Seiche – A standing wave in an enclosed or partially enclosed body of water
- Shallow water equations – A set of partial differential equations that describe the flow below a pressure surface in a fluid
- Significant wave height – The mean wave height of the highest third of the waves
- Sneaker wave – A disproportionately large coastal wave
- Soliton – a self-reinforcing solitary wave packet that maintains its shape while it propagates at a constant velocity
- Stokes boundary layer – The boundary layer close to a solid wall in oscillatory flow of a viscous fluid
- Stokes drift – Average velocity of a fluid parcel in a gravity wave
- Stokes wave – A non-linear and periodic surface wave on an inviscid fluid layer of constant mean depth
- Storm surge – Rise of water surface associated with a low pressure weather system
- Surf break – A permanent obstruction on the seabed which causes waves to break
- Swell (ocean) – A series of waves generated by distant weather systems
- Trochoidal wave – An exact solution of the Euler equations for periodic surface gravity waves
- Tsunami – Series of water waves caused by the displacement of a large volume of a body of water
- Tsunamis in lakes –
- Undertow (water waves) – Return flow below (nearshore) water waves.
- Ursell number – Dimensionless number indicating the nonlinearity of long surface gravity waves on a fluid layer.
- Wake – Region of recirculating flow immediately behind or downstream of a moving or stationary solid body
- Wave action (continuum mechanics) – A conservable measure of the wave part of a motion
- Wave base – The maximum depth at which a water wave's passage causes significant water motion
- Wave height – The difference between the elevations of a crest and a neighbouring trough
- Wave-making resistance – The energy required to push the water out of the way of the hull, which creates the associated waves
- Wave-piercing hull – Hull with a very fine bow with low reserve buoyancy which allows it to pass through the wave with minimum vertical movement
- Wave power – Transport of energy by wind waves, and the capture of that energy to do useful work (technology)
- Wave radar – Technology for measuring surface waves on water
- Wave setup – The increase in mean water level due to the presence of breaking waves
- Wave shoaling – The effect by which surface waves entering shallower water change in wave height
- Wave tank – A laboratory setup for observing the behavior of surface waves
- Wave turbulence – A set of nonlinear waves deviated far from thermal equilibrium.
- Wave–current interaction – The interaction between surface gravity waves and a mean flow
- Waves and shallow water – The effect of shallow water on a surface gravity wave
- Whitham equation – A non-local model for non-linear dispersive waves
- Wind wave – Surface waves generated by wind that occur on the free surface of bodies of water
- Wind-wave dissipation – The process by which waves generated by a weather system lose their mechanical energy
- Wind wave model – A way to depict the sea state and predict the evolution of the energy of wind waves using numerical techniques

== Oceanographical institutions and major projects ==
=== Expeditions ===
- Albatross expedition – A Swedish oceanographic expedition in 1947 and 1948
- Challenger expedition – Oceanographic research expedition (1872–1876)
- Deepsea Challenger – Deep-diving submersible designed to reach the bottom of Challenger Deep
- Galathea expeditions – A series of three Danish ship-based scientific research expeditions in the 19th, 20th and 21st centuries
- German Meteor expedition – An oceanographic expedition that explored the South Atlantic Ocean from the equatorial region to Antarctica in 1925–192
- Global Ocean Sampling Expedition – An ocean exploration genome project to assess genetic diversity in marine microbial communities
- International Indian Ocean Expedition – A large scale multinational hydrographic survey of the Indian Ocean which took place from 1959 to 1965.
- Malaspina Expedition – A five-year maritime scientific exploration commanded by Alessandro Malaspina and José de Bustamante y Guerra
- Malaspina Expedition 2010 – An interdisciplinary research project to assess the impact of global change on the oceans and explore their biodiversity
- Mission 31 – An undersea expedition organized by Fabien Cousteau in the undersea laboratory Aquarius in the Florida Keys, scuba diving to collect scientific data and IMAX footage
- NOAAS Okeanos Explorer Gulf of Mexico 2017 Expedition – The first of three expeditions on the NOAAS Okeanos Explorer intended to increase the understanding of the deep-sea environment in the Gulf of Mexico
- NOAAS Okeanos Explorer Gulf of Mexico 2018 Expedition – The final of three expeditions on the NOAAS Okeanos Explorer intended to increase the understanding of the deep-sea environment in the Gulf of Mexico
- North Pacific Exploring and Surveying Expedition – A United States scientific and exploring project from 1853 to 1856.
- Siboga expedition – A Dutch zoological and hydrographic expedition to Indonesia from March 1899 to February 1900.
- Snellius Expedition – A Dutch oceanographic expedition in the waters of eastern Indonesia.
- SUPER HI-CAT – Research cruise to study the microbial communities and the biogeochemistry associated with the Great Pacific Garbage Patch
- Valdivia Expedition – A scientific expedition organised and funded by the German Empire under Kaiser Wilhelm II and was named after the ship which was bought and outfitted for the expedition
- The Voyage of the Odyssey – A 5-year program conducted by oceanographic research and education non-profit Ocean Alliance, which collected the first baseline data set on contaminants in the world's oceans

=== Organisations ===
- Association for the Sciences of Limnology and Oceanography – A scientific society
- Bigelow Laboratory for Ocean Sciences – A private, non-profit center for global oceanography, ocean science education, and technology transfer.
- Bureau of Oceans and International Environmental and Scientific Affairs – A bureau within the United States Department of State
- Center for Microbial Oceanography: Research and Education – A research and education organization established in 2006 as a National Science Foundation funded Science and Technology Center
- Centers for Space Oceanography – An operating division of the Argos Foundation, Inc
- Challenger Society for Marine Science – An interdisciplinary learned society of the United Kingdom
- Club of Rome – An organisation of individuals who claim to share a common concern for the future of humanity and strive to make a difference.
- CSIRO Oceans and Atmosphere – A unit of the Commonwealth Scientific and Industrial Research Organisation of Australia
- Flanders Marine Institute – Organization in Flanders, northern Belgium that supports marine research
- Institut für Meereskunde Kiel – German institute for marine sciences
- InterRidge – A non-profit organisation that promotes interdisciplinary, international studies in the research of oceanic spreading centres
- Marine Environmental Data and Information Network – A United Kingdom organization created to curate marine environmental data
- Marine Science Co-ordination Committee – A UK government committee composed of representatives from public-funded bodies who have a remit to undertake marine scientific research
- Marine Technology Society – Professional society in the field of marine technology
- Max Planck Institute for Biogeochemistry – Institute in the Max Planck Society located in Jena, Germany
- National Centers for Environmental Information – Active US archive of environmental data
- National Climatic Data Center – Active US archive of weather data.
- National Oceanographic Partnership Program – American organization
- Observatoire océanologique de Banyuls-sur-Mer – A marine station located in Banyuls-sur-Mer on the Mediterranean coast of France
- Observatoire Oceanologique de Villefranche – A field campus of the Université Paris 6 in Villefranche-sur-Mer on the Côte d'Azur, France
- Ocean Elders – Activist group dedicated to protecting the ocean and its wildlife
- Oceanographic Museum – A museum of marine sciences in Monaco-Ville, Monaco
- Pacific Islands Ocean Observing System – Organisation in US Integrated Ocean Observing System
- Partnership for Observation of the Global Oceans – Organisation
- Station biologique de Roscoff – A French marine biology and oceanography research and teaching centre
- Tsunami Society – A professional society for the research of and dissemination of knowledge about tsunamis

=== Projects ===
- Antarctic Benthic Deep-Sea Biodiversity Project – An international project to investigate deep-water biology of the Scotia and Weddell seas
- Antarctic Technology Offshore Lagoon Laboratory – A floating oceanographic laboratory for in situ observation experiments
- Argo (oceanography) – International oceanographic observation program
- Atlantic Meridional Transect – A multi-decadal oceanographic programme that undertakes biological, chemical and physical research during annual voyages between the UK and destinations in the South Atlantic
- BENGAL (project) – A three-year multidisciplinary study of the abyssal benthic boundary layer in the northeast Atlantic
- Bermuda Atlantic Time-series Study – A long-term oceanographic study by the Bermuda Institute of Ocean Sciences
- Biogeography of Deep-Water Chemosynthetic Ecosystems – Project to determine the biogeography and understand the processes driving these systems
- British Mid-Ocean Ridge Initiative – A multidisciplinary scientific investigation of the creation of the Earth's crust in the deep oceans.
- British Oceanographic Data Centre – A national facility for conserving and distributing data about the marine environment
- CLIWOC – A research project to convert ships' logbook weather data into a computerised database
- Coastal-Marine Automated Network – A meteorological observation network along the coast of the United States
- Community Earth System Model – A fully coupled numerical simulation of Earth systems
- Coriolis (project) – A joint oceanographic project of seven French institutes
- Deep Sea Drilling Project – Ocean drilling research program between 1966 and 1983
- Defying Ocean's End – A global agenda for action in marine conservation
- Discovery Investigations – A series of scientific cruises and shore-based investigations into the biology of whales in the Southern Ocean
- European Consortium for Ocean Research Drilling – A consortium of 14 European countries and Canada that was formed in 2003 to join the Integrated Ocean Drilling Program
- European Multidisciplinary Seafloor and water column Observatory – A large-scale European distributed Research Infrastructure for ocean observation
- Expocode – A unique alphanumeric identifier for cruise labels of research vessels to avoid confusion in oceanographic data management.
- FESOM – A multi-resolution ocean general circulation model that solves the equations of motion describing the ocean and sea ice using finite-element and finite-volume methods on unstructured computational grids
- Finite Volume Community Ocean Model – A prognostic, unstructured-grid, free-surface, 3-D primitive equation coastal ocean circulation model
- General Bathymetric Chart of the Oceans – A publicly available bathymetric chart of the world's oceans
- General circulation model – A type of climate model that uses the Navier–Stokes equations on a rotating sphere with thermodynamic terms for various energy sources
- Geochemical Ocean Sections Study – A global survey of the three-dimensional distributions of chemical, isotopic, and radiochemical tracers in the ocean
- Geotraces – International research programme to improve understanding of biogeochemical cycles in the oceans
- Glacio-geological databases – Data on glacially associated sedimentary deposits and erosion activity from former and current ice-sheets
- Global Drifter Program – Collecting measurements of surface ocean currents, sea surface temperature and sea-level atmospheric pressure using drifters
- Global Historical Climatology Network – A database of temperature, precipitation and pressure records
- Global Ocean Data Analysis Project – A synthesis project bringing together oceanographic data
- Global Ocean Ecosystem Dynamics – A core project for understanding how global change will affect the abundance, diversity and productivity of marine populations
- Global Ocean Observing System – A global system for sustained observations of the ocean comprising the oceanographic component of the Global Earth Observing System of Systems
- Hawaii Ocean Time-series – A long-term oceanographic study based at the University of Hawaii at Manoa
- Hotspot Ecosystem Research and Man's Impact On European Seas – An international multidisciplinary project that studies deep-sea ecosystems
- Hotspot Ecosystems Research on the Margins of European Seas – An international multidisciplinary project that studied deep-sea ecosystems along Europe's deep-ocean margin
- IMBER – International project for marine research
- Ocean acidification in the Great Barrier Reef – Project?
- Index to Marine & Lacustrine Geological Samples – A collaboration between twenty institutions and agencies that operate geological sample repositories
- Integrated Ocean Drilling Program – Marine research program between 2003–2013 to monitor and sample sub-seafloor environments
- International Ocean Discovery Program – An international marine research collaboration for drilling, coring, and monitoring the subseafloor
- Joint Global Ocean Flux Study – An international research programme on the fluxes of carbon between the atmosphere and ocean, and within the ocean interior
- Integrated Ocean Observing System – An organization of systems that routinely and continuously provides quality controlled data and information on current and future states of the oceans and Great Lakes
- List of ocean circulation models – A list of ocean circulation models, as used in physical oceanography.
- MIT General Circulation Model – A numerical computer method that solves the equations of motion for the ocean or atmosphere using the finite volume method
- Model for Prediction Across Scales – A coupled Earth system modelling package that integrates atmospheric, oceanographic and cryospheric modelling on a variety of scales
- Modular Ocean Model – A three-dimensional ocean circulation model for studying the ocean climate system
- Monterey Accelerated Research System – A cabled-based observatory system below the surface of Monterey Bay
- MyOcean – A series of projects granted by the European Commission to set up a pan-European capacity for ocean monitoring and forecasting
- National Oceanographic Data Center – One of the national environmental data centers operated by the National Oceanic and Atmospheric Administration
- NOBM – NASA Ocean Biogeochemical Model is a three-dimensional representation of coupled circulation/biogeochemical/radiative processes in the global oceans
- Nucleus for European Modelling of the Ocean – A general model of ocean circulation developed by a European consortium
- Ocean Drilling Program – Marine research program between 1985 and 2003
- Ocean general circulation model – Model to describe physical and thermodynamic processes in oceans
- Ocean observations – List of currently feasible essential observations for climate research
- Ocean Observatories Initiative – A program that focuses the work of an emerging network of science driven ocean observing systems
- Ocean Surface Topography Mission – International Earth observation satellite mission
- Operation Highjump – United States Navy operation to establish an Antarctic research base
- Operation Windmill – US Navy Antarctica expedition
- OceanoScientific – A programme to study climate change at the ocean-atmosphere interface
- Parallel Ocean Program – A three-dimensional ocean circulation model designed primarily for studying the ocean climate system
- POLYGON experiment – An experiment in oceanography conducted in middle of the Atlantic Ocean during the 1970s
- Precontinent – Undersea research habitat in the Red Sea
- Prediction and Research Moored Array in the Atlantic – A system of moored observation buoys in the tropical Atlantic Ocean which collect meteorological and oceanographic data
- Princeton ocean model –
- Project Kaisei – Project to study and clean up the Great Pacific Garbage Patch
- Project Mohole – Attempt in the early 1960s to drill through the Earth's crust into the Mohorovičić discontinuity
- Project Vamp – US Navy project to survey Virginia and Massachusetts shores
- Rapid Climate Change-Meridional Overturning Circulation and Heatflux Array – A collaborative research project in the North Atlantic Ocean
- Regional Ocean Modeling System – A free-surface, terrain-following, primitive equations ocean model
- Research Moored Array for African-Asian-Australian Monsoon Analysis and Prediction – A system of moored observation buoys in the Indian Ocean that collects meteorological and oceanographic data
- SCICEX – Research program involving a collaboration between the U.S. Navy and academic researchers
- SeaDataNet – An international project of oceanography to enable the scientific community to access historical datasets owned by national data centers
- Simple Ocean Data Assimilation – An oceanic re-analysis data set consisting of gridded state variables for the global ocean
- SOCCOM project – Project to increase the understanding of the Southern Ocean
- Station P (ocean measurement site) – A geographically located ocean measurement site
- Tropical Atmosphere Ocean project – A major international effort that instrumented the tropical Pacific Ocean with deep ocean moorings
- World Ocean Atlas – A data product of the Ocean Climate Laboratory of the National Oceanographic Data Center (U.S.)
- World Ocean Circulation Experiment –
- United States Navy use of Hydrometer 1800s – Historical use of the measuring equipment
- United States Exploring Expedition – An exploring and surveying expedition, 1838 to 1842
- World Ocean Circulation Experiment – A component of the international World Climate Research Program
- World Ocean Database Project – An international collection of ocean profile-plankton data
- World Ocean Review – An extensive report, dealing with the state of the world ocean, the interactions between the ocean and ecological, economical and sociopolitical conditions

== History of oceanography ==
- Aethiopian Sea – The name given to the southern part of the Atlantic Ocean in classical geographical works

=== Oceanography awards ===
- A.G. Huntsman Award for Excellence in the Marine Sciences – Medal awarded by the Royal Society of Canada
- Alexander Agassiz Medal – Medal awarded by the U.S. National Academy of Sciences for an original contribution in the science of oceanography
- Hans Hass Award – Award in recognition of contribution made to the advancement of our knowledge of the ocean
- Henry Stommel Research Award – Medallion awarded by the American Meteorological Society to researchers in the dynamic and physics of the ocean
- International Meteorological Organization Prize – Annual award of the World Meteorological Organization in the fields of meteorology and operational hydrology
- Ramón Margalef Award for Excellence in Education – Educational award in the fields of limnology and oceanography
- Sverdrup Gold Medal Award – Award by the American Meteorological Society for contributions regarding interactions between the oceans and the atmosphere

=== Politics, laws and activism ===
- Oceans Act of 2000 – US law to establish policy on the oceans
- United States Commission on Ocean Policy – A US commission to establish findings and recommendations for a national ocean policy

== Persons influential in oceanography ==
- Chris Freeman (scientist) – British biochemist, Professor at Bangor University
- Philip Froelich – An American academic oceanographic scientist
- Thomas J. Goreau – A biogeochemist and marine biologist
- Edward Brinton – American academic oceanographer and biologist
- John Francon Williams – A Welsh writer, geographer, historian, journalist, cartographer and inventor
- E. Virginia Armbrust – A biological oceanographer
- James Johnstone (biologist) – Scottish biologist and oceanographer (1870–1932)

=== Marine geologists ===
Marine geology – The study of the history and structure of the ocean floor

- Tanya Atwater – American geophysicist and marine geologist
- John V. Byrne – American marine geologist and academic
- Peter Clift – British marine geologist and geophysicist
- Robert S. Dietz – American marine geologist, geophysicist and oceanographer
- Robert F. Dill – American marine geologist
- Robert Dolan (marine geologist) – American geologist (1929–2016)
- Liviu Giosan – Romanian and American marine geologist
- William W. Hay – American marine geologist, micropaleontologist, paleoceanographer, and paleoclimatologist
- Hartmut Heinrich – German marine geologist and climatologist
- Hans Holtedahl – Norwegian geologist
- Eystein Jansen – Norwegian marine geologist and paleoceanographer
- Maria Klenova – Russian and Soviet marine geologist
- Steven Kuehl – American marine geologist
- Drummond Matthews – British marine geologist and geophysicist
- Larry Mayer – American geophysicist and marine geologist
- Henry William Menard – American geologist
- John Milliman – American marine geologist
- Maureen Raymo – American paleoclimatologist and marine geologist
- Ivan Rosenqvist – Norwegian marine geologist
- Hassan Nasiem Siddiquie – Indian marine geologist
- Frederick Vine – English marine geologist and geophysicist
- Wang Pinxian – Chinese marine geologist

=== Journals ===
- African Journal of Marine Science – A peer-reviewed scientific journal covering all disciplines of marine science
- Annual Review of Marine Science – An annual peer-reviewed scientific review journal published by Annual Reviews
- Bulletin of Marine Science – A peer-reviewed scientific journal published by the Rosenstiel School of Marine and Atmospheric Science of the University of Miami
- Estuarine, Coastal and Shelf Science – A peer-reviewed academic journal on ocean sciences, with a focus on coastal regions ranging from estuaries up to the edge of the continental shelf.
- ICES Journal of Marine Science – A peer-reviewed scientific journal covering oceanography and marine biology. It is published by Oxford University Press on behalf of the International Council for the Exploration of the Sea
- Journal of Applied Ichthyology – A peer-reviewed scientific journal on ichthyology, marine biology, and oceanography published by Wiley-Blackwell
- Journal of Atmospheric and Oceanic Technology – A scientific publication by the American Meteorological Society
- Journal of Geophysical Research: Oceans – A peer-reviewed scientific journal managed by the American Geophysical Union.
- Journal of Physical Oceanography – A peer-reviewed scientific journal published by the American Meteorological Society.
- Marine and Petroleum Geology – A peer-reviewed scientific journal
- Marine Geology – A peer-reviewed scientific journal
- Ocean Science – An open-access peer-reviewed scientific journal published by Copernicus Publications on behalf of the European Geosciences Union
- Oceanography – A quarterly peer-reviewed scientific journal published by the Oceanography Society
- Paleoceanography – A peer-reviewed scientific journal published by the American Geophysical Union
- Polar Science – A quarterly peer-reviewed scientific journal covering research related to the polar regions of the Earth and other planets
- Scientia Marina – A peer-reviewed academic journal on marine research published by Institut de Ciències del Mar de Barcelona
