= World Ocean Database Project =

International collection of ocean profile-plankton data

The World Ocean Database Project, or WOD, was established by the Intergovernmental Oceanographic Commission (IOC). The project leader was Sydney Levitus, also director of the International Council for Science (ICSU) World Data Center (WDC) for Oceanography, Silver Spring. Sydney Levitus retired in 2013. In recognition of the success of the IOC Global Oceanographic Data Archaeological and Rescue Project (GODAR project), a proposal was presented at the 16th Session of the Committee on International Oceanographic Data and Information Exchange (IODE), which was held in Lisbon, Portugal, in October–November 2000, to establish the World Ocean Database Project. This project is intended to stimulate the international exchange of modern oceanographic data, encourage the development of regional oceanographic databases, and implement regional quality control procedures. After the Portugal meeting, the IODE endorsed this new project, and the IOC subsequently approved this project in June 2001.

The World Ocean Database represents the world's largest collection of ocean profile-plankton data available internationally without restriction. Data comes from the: (a) Sixty-five National Oceanographic Data Centers and nine Designated National Agencies (DNAs) (in Croatia, Finland, Georgia, Malaysia, Romania, Senegal, Sweden, Tanzania, and Ukraine), (b) International Ocean Observing Projects such as the completed World Ocean Circulation Experiment (WOCE) and Joint Global Ocean Flux Study (JGOFS), as well as currently active programs such as CLIVAR and Argo, (c) International Ocean Data Management Projects such as the IOC/IODE Global Oceanographic Data Archaeology and Rescue Project (GODAR), and (d) Real-time Ocean Observing Systems such as the IOC/IODE Global Temperature-Salinity Profile Project (GTSPP). All ocean data acquired by WDC Silver Spring – USA are considered part of the WDC archive and are freely available as public domain data.

== Comparison of World Ocean Databases ==
The World Ocean Database was first released in 1994 and updates have been released approximately every four years: 1998, 2001, and 2005. The most recent World Ocean Database series, WOD09, was released in September 2009. WOD09 has more than 9 million temperature and 3.6 million salinity profiles. The table compares the number of stations by instrument type in WOD09 with previous NODC/WDC global ocean databases.

Instrument Type	NODC (1974)	NODC (1991)	WOA94	WOD98	WOD01	WOD05	WOD09
OSD	425,000	783,912	1,194,407	1,373,440	2,121,042	2,258,437	2,541,298
CTD	na	66,450	89,000	189,555	311,943	443,953	641,845
MBT	775,000	980,377	1,922,170	2,077,200	2,376,206	2,421,940	2,426,749
XBT	290,000	704,424	1,281,942	1,537,203	1,743,590	1,930,413	2,104,490
MRB	na	na	na	107,715	297,936	445,371	566,544
DRB	na	na	na	na	50,549	108,564	121,828
PFL	na	na	na	na	22,637	168,988	547,985
UOR	na	na	na	na	37,645	46,699	88,190
APB	na	na	na	na	75,665	75,665	88,583
GLD	na	na	na	na	na	338	5,857
Total Stations	1,490,000	2,535,163	4,487,519	5,285,113	7,037,213	7,900,368	9,133,369
Plankton	na	na	na	83,650	142,900	150,250	218,695
SUR	na	na	na	na	4,743	9,178	9,178

== Instrument Types ==
Ocean profile, plankton data, and metadata are available in the World Ocean Database for 29 depth-dependent variables (physical and biochemical) and 11 instrument types: Ocean Station Data (OSD), Mechanical Bathythermograph (MBT), Expendable Bathythermograph (XBT), Conductivity, Temperature, Depth (CTD), Undulating Oceanographic Recorder (UOR), Profiling Float (PFL), Moored Buoy (MRB), Drifting Buoy (DRB), Gliders (GLD), Autonomous Pinniped Bathythermograph (APB).

== Word Ocean Database Products ==
The data in the World Ocean Database are made available through the online search and retrieval system known as WODselect. The World Ocean Atlas (WOAselect) series is a set of gridded (1° grid), climatological, objectively analyzed fields of the variables in the World Ocean Database. The WOAselect is a selection tool by which the user can designate a geographic area, depth, and oceanographic variable to view climatological means or related statistics for a given variable at the requested depth for the requested geographic area.

== See also ==
- Geochemical Ocean Sections Study (GEOSECS)
- Global Ocean Data Analysis Project (GLODAP)
- Ocean heat content
- World Ocean Atlas (WOA)
- World Ocean Circulation Experiment (WOCE)
