= Global Ocean Ecosystem Dynamics =

Global change effects on marine populations

Global Ocean Ecosystem Dynamics (GLOBEC) is a International Geosphere-Biosphere Programme (IGBP) core project responsible for understanding how global change will affect the abundance, diversity and productivity of marine populations. The programme was initiated by SCOR and the IOC of UNESCO in 1991, to understand how global change will affect the abundance, diversity and productivity of marine populations comprising a major component of oceanic ecosystems.

The aim of GLOBEC is to advance our understanding of the structure and functioning of the global ocean ecosystem, its major subsystems, and its response to physical forcing so that a capability can be developed to forecast the responses of the marine ecosystem to global change.

== Structure ==
GLOBEC encompasses an integrated suite of research activities consisting of Regional Programmes, National Activities and cross-cutting research focal activities. The GLOBEC programme has been developed by the Scientific Steering Committee (SSC) and is coordinated through the GLOBEC International Project Office (IPO).

Regional Programmes:

- Ecosystem Structure of Subarctic Seas (ESSAS)
- CLimate Impacts on Oceanic TOp Predators (CLIOTOP)
- ICES Cod and Climate Change (CCC)
- PICES Climate Change and Carrying Capacity (CCCC)
- Southern Ocean GLOBEC (SO GLOBEC)
- Small Pelagic Fish and Climate Change (SPACC)
- GLOBEC Northeastern Pacific (GLOBEC NEP)

National Programmes:

GLOBEC has several active national programmes and scientists from nearly 30 countries participate in GLOBEC activities on a national or regional level.

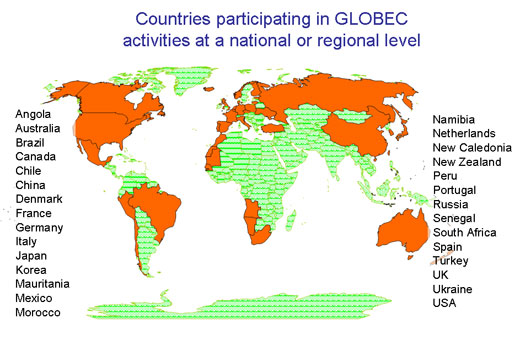

Focus Working Groups:

There are four GLOBEC cross-cutting research focal activities:

- Focus 1. Retrospective analysis
- Focus 2. Process studies
- Focus 3. Prediction and modelling
- Focus 4. Feedback from ecosystem changes

== Publications ==
GLOBEC produces a report series, special contributions series and a biennial newsletter, all of which can be downloaded from the GLOBEC website. GLOBEC science has contributed to over 2000 refereed scientific publications which can be searched from a database on the GLOBEC website.

Recent GLOBEC Reports:

- GLOBEC Report No.22: Report of a GLOBEC/SPACC meeting on small pelagic fish spawning habitat dynamics and the daily egg production method (DEPM), 14–16 January 2004, Concepcion, Chile.
- GLOBEC Report No.21: Report of a GLOBEC/SPACC workshop on small pelagic fish spawning habitat dynamics and the daily egg production method (DEPM), 12–13 January 2004, Concepcion, Chile.
- GLOBEC Report No.20: Background on the climatology, physical oceanography and ecosystems of the sub-Arctic seas. Appendix to the ESSAS Science Plan.
- GLOBEC Report No.19: Ecosystem Studies of Sub-Arctic Seas (ESSAS) Science Plan.
- GLOBEC Report No.18: Climate Impacts on Oceanic Top Predators (CLIOTOP) Science Plan and Implementation Strategy.

== See also ==
- Global Ocean Data Analysis Project (GLODAP)
- Joint Global Ocean Flux Study (JGOFS)
- World Ocean Atlas (WOA)
- World Ocean Circulation Experiment (WOCE)
