= Alkalinity =

Capacity of water to resist changes in pH that would make the water more acidic

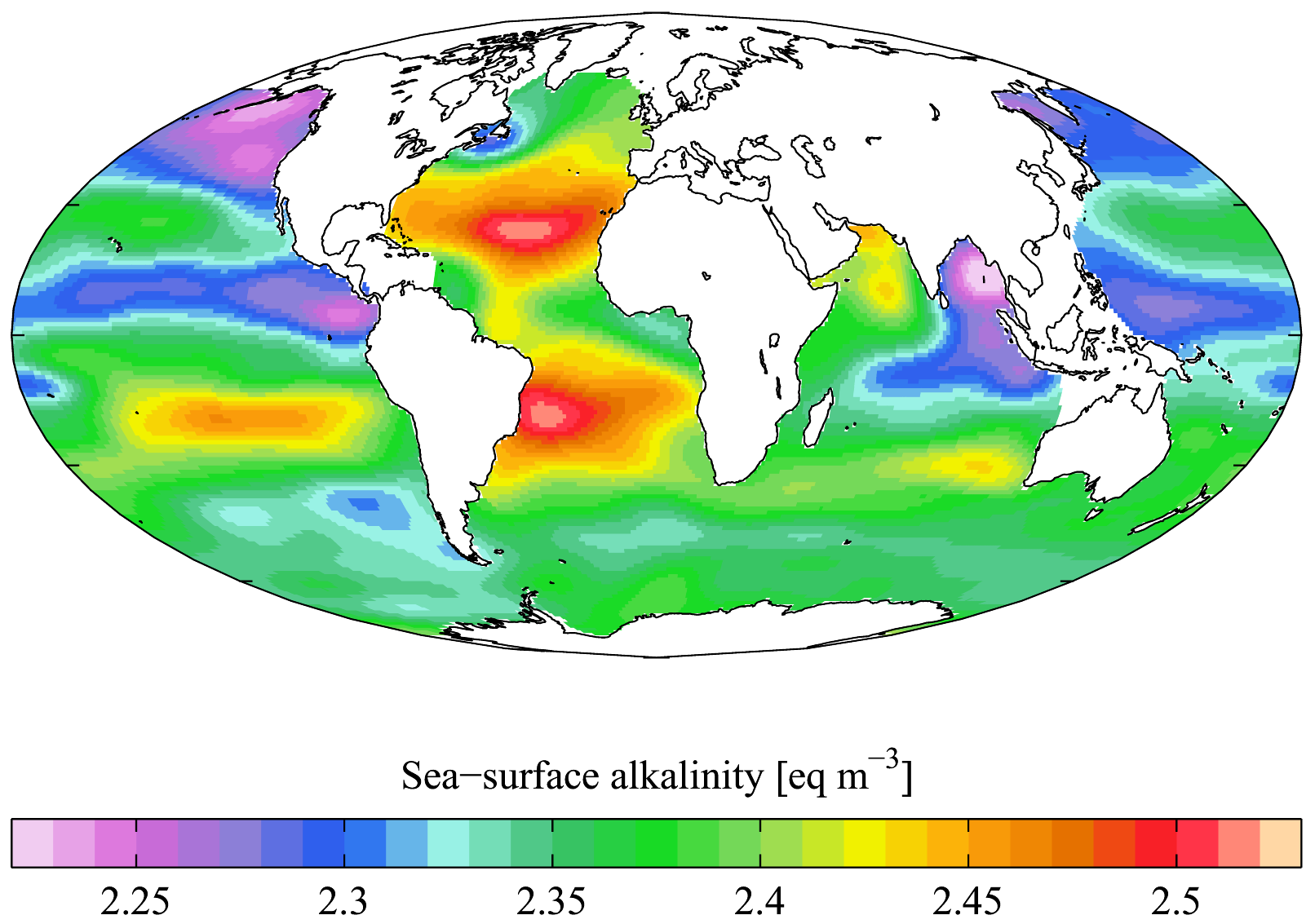
Sea surface alkalinity (from the GLODAP climatology).

Alkalinity (from Arabic: القلوية, romanized: al-qaly, lit. 'ashes of the saltwort') is the capacity of water to resist acidification. It should not be confused with basicity, which is an absolute measurement on the pH scale. Alkalinity is the strength of a buffer solution composed of weak acids and their conjugate bases. It is measured by titrating the solution with an acid such as HCl until its pH changes abruptly, or it reaches a known endpoint where that happens. Alkalinity is expressed in units of concentration, such as meq/L (milliequivalents per liter), μeq/kg (microequivalents per kilogram), or mg/L CaCO_{3} (milligrams per liter as calcium carbonate). Each of these measurements corresponds to an amount of acid added as a titrant.

In freshwater, particularly those on non-limestone terrains, alkalinities are low and involve a lot of ions. In the ocean, on the other hand, alkalinity is completely dominated by carbonate and bicarbonate plus a small contribution from borate.

Although alkalinity is primarily a term used by limnologists and oceanographers, it is also used by hydrologists to describe temporary hardness. Moreover, measuring alkalinity is important in determining a stream's ability to neutralize acidic pollution from rainfall or wastewater. It is one of the best measures of the sensitivity of the stream to acid inputs. There can be long-term changes in the alkalinity of streams and rivers in response to human disturbances such as acid rain generated by SO_{x} and NO_{x} emissions.

== History ==
In 1884, Professor Wilhelm (William) Dittmar of Anderson College, now the University of Strathclyde, analysed 77 pristine seawater samples from around the world brought back by the Challenger expedition. He found that in seawater the major ions were in a fixed ratio, confirming the hypothesis of Johan Georg Forchhammer, that is now known as the Principle of Constant Proportions. However, there was one exception. Dittmar found that the concentration of calcium was slightly greater in the deep ocean, and named this increase alkalinity.

Also in 1884, Svante Arrhenius submitted his PhD thesis in which he advocated the existence of ions in solution, and defined acids as hydronium ion donors and bases as hydroxide ion donors. For that work, he received the Nobel Prize in Chemistry in 1903. See also Svante Arrhenius#Ionic disassociation.

== Simplified summary ==
Alkalinity roughly refers to the molar equivalent concentration of bases in a solution that can be converted to uncharged species by a strong acid. By the isohydric principle, this is measured by summing the effects of the different bases. Molar equivalent concentration means the charge-equivalent concentration of single-charge ions. For example, 1 mole of HCO^{−}_{3} in solution represents 1 molar equivalent, while 1 mole of CO^{2−}_{3} is 2 molar equivalents because twice as many H^{+} ions would be necessary to balance the charge. The total charge of a solution always equals zero. This leads to a parallel definition of alkalinity that is based upon the charge balance of ions in a solution.

$$\sum(\text{cations})=\sum(\text{anions})$$

Certain ions, including Na^{+}, K^{+}, Ca^{2+}, Mg^{2+}, Cl^{−}, SO^{2−}_{4}, and NO^{−}_{3} are "conservative" such that they are not affected by changes in temperature, pressure or pH, in contrast to nonconservative ions such as HCO^{−}_{3} that are. Isolating the conservative ions on one side of this charge balance equation, makes the nonconservative ions which accept or donate protons and thus define alkalinity clustered on the other side of the equation.

$$\begin{align}
&\sum(\text{conservative cations})-\sum(\text{conservative anions}) = \\
&\quad [\mathrm{HCO_3^-}]+2[\mathrm{CO_3^{2-}}]+[\mathrm{B(OH)_4^-}]+
[\mathrm{OH^-}]+[\mathrm{HPO_4^{2-}}]+2[\mathrm{PO_4^{3-}}]+[\mathrm{H_3SiO_4^-}]+[\mathrm{NH_3}]+[\mathrm{HS^-}]-[\mathrm{H^+}]-[\mathrm{HSO_4^-}]-[\mathrm{HF}]-[\mathrm{H_3PO_4}]-[\mathrm{HNO_2}]
\end{align}$$

This combined charge balance and proton balance is called total alkalinity. Total alkalinity is not (much) affected by temperature, pressure, or pH, and is thus itself a conservative measurement, which increases its usefulness in aquatic systems. All anions except HCO^{−}_{3} and CO^{2−}_{3} have low concentrations in Earth's surface water (streams, rivers, and lakes). Thus carbonate alkalinity, which is equal to [HCO^{−}_{3}] + 2[CO^{2−}_{3}] is also approximately equal to the total alkalinity in surface water.

== Detailed description ==
Alkalinity measures the ability of a solution to neutralize acids to the equivalence point of carbonate or bicarbonate, defined as pH 4.5 for many oceanographic/limnological studies. The alkalinity is equal to the stoichiometric sum of the bases in solution. In most Earth surface waters carbonate alkalinity tends to make up most of the total alkalinity because of dissolution of commonly occurring carbonate rocks along with other geological weathering processes that produce carbonate anions. Other common natural components that can contribute to alkalinity include borate, hydroxide, phosphate, silicate, dissolved ammonia, and the conjugate bases of organic acids (e.g., acetate). Solutions produced in a laboratory may contain a virtually limitless number of species that contribute to alkalinity. Alkalinity is frequently given as molar equivalents per liter of solution or per kilogram of solvent. In commercial (e.g. the swimming pool industry) and regulatory contexts, alkalinity might also be given in parts per million of equivalent calcium carbonate (ppm CaCO_{3}). Alkalinity is sometimes incorrectly used interchangeably with basicity, but they are different measurements. For example, the addition of CO_{2} lowers the pH of a solution, thus reducing basicity while alkalinity remains unchanged (see example below).

A variety of titrants, endpoints, and indicators are specified for various alkalinity measurement methods. Hydrochloric and sulfuric acids are common acid titrants, while phenolphthalein, methyl red, and bromocresol green are common indicators.

== Theoretical treatment ==
In typical groundwater or seawater, the measured total alkalinity is set equal to:

A_{T} = [HCO^{−}_{3}]_{T} + 2[CO^{2−}_{3}]_{T} + [B(OH)^{−}_{4}]_{T} + [OH^{−}]_{T} + 2[PO^{3−}_{4}]_{T} + [HPO^{2−}_{4}]_{T} + [SiO(OH)^{−}_{3}]_{T} − [H^{+}]_{sws} − [HSO^{−}_{4}]

(Subscript T indicates the total concentration of the species in the solution as measured. This is opposed to the free concentration, which takes into account the significant amount of ion pair interactions that occur in seawater.)

Alkalinity can be measured by titrating a sample with a strong acid until all the buffering capacity of the aforementioned ions above the pH of bicarbonate or carbonate is consumed. This point is functionally set to pH 4.5. At this point, all the bases of interest have been protonated to the zero level species, hence they no longer cause alkalinity. In the carbonate system the bicarbonate ions [HCO^{−}_{3}] and the carbonate ions [CO^{2−}_{3}] have become converted to carbonic acid [H_{2}CO_{3}] at this pH. This pH is also called the CO_{2} equivalence point where the major component in water is dissolved CO_{2} which is converted to H_{2}CO_{3} in an aqueous solution. There are no strong acids or bases at this point. Therefore, the alkalinity is modeled and quantified with respect to the CO_{2} equivalence point. Because the alkalinity is measured with respect to the CO_{2} equivalence point, the dissolution of CO_{2}, although it adds acid and dissolved inorganic carbon, does not change the alkalinity. In natural conditions, the dissolution of basic rocks and addition of ammonia [NH_{3}] or organic amines leads to the addition of base to natural waters at the CO_{2} equivalence point. The dissolved base in water increases the pH and titrates an equivalent amount of CO_{2} to bicarbonate ion and carbonate ion. At equilibrium, the water contains a certain amount of alkalinity contributed by the concentration of weak acid anions. Conversely, the addition of acid converts weak acid anions to CO_{2} and continuous addition of strong acids can cause the alkalinity to become less than zero. For example, the following reactions take place during the addition of acid to a typical seawater solution:

B(OH)^{−}_{4} + H^{+} → B(OH)_{3} + H_{2}O

OH^{−} + H^{+} → H_{2}O

PO^{3−}_{4} + 2 H^{+} → H_{2}PO^{−}_{4}

HPO^{2−}_{4} + H^{+} → H_{2}PO^{−}_{4}

[SiO(OH)^{−}_{3}] + H^{+} → [Si(OH)_{4}]

It can be seen from the above protonation reactions that most bases consume one proton (H^{+}) to become a neutral species, thus increasing alkalinity by one per equivalent. CO^{2−}_{3} however, will consume two protons before becoming a zero-level species (CO_{2}), thus it increases alkalinity by two per mole of CO^{2−}_{3}. [H^{+}] and [HSO^{−}_{4}] decrease alkalinity, as they act as sources of protons. They are often represented collectively as [H^{+}]_{T}.

Alkalinity is typically reported as mg/L as CaCO_{3}. (The conjunction "as" is appropriate in this case because the alkalinity results from a mixture of ions but is reported "as if" all of this is due to CaCO_{3}.) This can be converted into milliequivalents per Liter (meq/L) by dividing by 50 (the approximate MW of CaCO_{3} divided by 2).

== Carbon dioxide interactions ==
=== Addition of CO_{2} ===
Addition (or removal) of CO_{2} to a solution does not change its alkalinity, since the net reaction produces the same number of equivalents of positively contributing species (H^{+}) as negative contributing species (HCO^{−}_{3} and/or CO^{2−}_{3}). Adding CO_{2} to the solution lowers its pH, but does not affect alkalinity.

At all pH values:

CO_{2} + H_{2}O ⇌ HCO^{−}_{3} + H^{+}

Only at high (basic) pH values:

HCO^{−}_{3} + H^{+} ⇌ CO^{2−}_{3} + 2 H^{+}

=== Dissolution of carbonate rock ===
Addition of CO_{2} to a solution in contact with a solid can (over time) affect the alkalinity, especially for carbonate minerals in contact with groundwater or seawater. The dissolution (or precipitation) of carbonate rock has a strong influence on the alkalinity. This is because carbonate rock is composed of CaCO_{3} and its dissociation will add Ca^{2+} and CO^{2−}_{3} into solution. Ca^{2+} will not influence alkalinity, but CO^{2−}_{3} will increase alkalinity by 2 units. Increased dissolution of carbonate rock by acidification from acid rain and mining has contributed to increased alkalinity concentrations in some major rivers throughout the eastern U.S. The following reaction shows how acid rain, containing sulfuric acid, can have the effect of increasing river alkalinity by increasing the amount of bicarbonate ion:

2 CaCO_{3} + H_{2}SO_{4} → 2 Ca^{2+} + 2 HCO^{−}_{3} + SO^{2−}_{4}

Another way of writing this is:

CaCO_{3} + H^{+} ⇌ Ca^{2+} + HCO^{−}_{3}

The lower the pH, the higher the concentration of bicarbonate will be. This shows how a lower pH can lead to higher alkalinity if the amount of bicarbonate produced is greater than the amount of H^{+} remaining after the reaction. This is the case since the amount of acid in the rainwater is low. If this alkaline groundwater later comes into contact with the atmosphere, it can lose CO_{2}, precipitate carbonate, and thereby become less alkaline again. When carbonate minerals, water, and the atmosphere are all in equilibrium, the reversible reaction

CaCO_{3} + 2 H^{+} ⇌ Ca^{2+} + CO_{2} + H_{2}O

shows that pH will be related to calcium ion concentration, with lower pH going with higher calcium ion concentration. In this case, the higher the pH, the more bicarbonate and carbonate ion there will be, in contrast to the paradoxical situation described above, where one does not have equilibrium with the atmosphere.

== Changes to oceanic alkalinity ==
In the ocean, alkalinity is completely dominated by carbonate and bicarbonate plus a small contribution from borate.

Thus the chemical equation for alkalinity in seawater is:

A_{T} = [HCO_{3}^{−}] + 2[CO_{3}^{2-}] + [B(OH)_{4}^{−}]

There are many methods of alkalinity generation in the ocean. Perhaps the most well known is the dissolution of calcium carbonate to form Ca^{2+} and CO^{2−}_{3} (carbonate). The carbonate ion has the potential to absorb two hydrogen ions. Therefore, it causes a net increase in ocean alkalinity. Calcium carbonate dissolution occurs in regions of the ocean which are undersaturated with respect to calcium carbonate.

The increasing carbon dioxide level in the atmosphere, due to carbon dioxide emissions, results in increasing absorption of CO_{2} from the atmosphere into the oceans. This does not affect the ocean's alkalinity but it does result in a reduction in pH value (called ocean acidification). Ocean alkalinity enhancement has been proposed as one option to add alkalinity to the ocean and therefore buffer against pH changes.

Biological processes have a much greater impact on oceanic alkalinity on short (minutes to centuries) timescales. Denitrification and sulfate reduction occur in oxygen-limited environments. Both of these processes consume hydrogen ions (thus increasing alkalinity) and release gases (N_{2} or H_{2}S), which eventually escape into the atmosphere. Nitrification and sulfide oxidation both decrease alkalinity by releasing protons as a byproduct of oxidation reactions.

=== Global temporal and spatial variability ===
The ocean's alkalinity varies over time, most significantly over geologic timescales (millennia). Changes in the balance between terrestrial weathering and sedimentation of carbonate minerals (for example, as a function of ocean acidification) are the primary long-term drivers of alkalinity in the ocean. Over human timescales, mean ocean alkalinity is relatively stable. Seasonal and annual variability of mean ocean alkalinity is very low.

Alkalinity varies by location depending on evaporation/precipitation, advection of water, biological processes, and geochemical processes.

River dominated mixing also occurs close to the shore; it is strongest close to the mouth of a large river. Here, the rivers can act as either a source or a sink of alkalinity. A_{T} follows the outflow of the river and has a linear relationship with salinity.

Oceanic alkalinity also follows general trends based on latitude and depth. It has been shown that A_{T} is often inversely proportional to sea surface temperature (SST). Therefore, it generally increases with high latitudes and depths. As a result, upwelling areas (where water from the deep ocean is pushed to the surface) also have higher alkalinity values.

There are many programs to measure, record, and study oceanic alkalinity, together with many of the other characteristics of seawater, like temperature and salinity. These include: GEOSECS (Geochemical Ocean Sections Study), TTO/NAS (Transient Tracers in the Ocean/North Atlantic Study), JGOFS (Joint Global Ocean Flux Study), WOCE (World Ocean Circulation Experiment), CARINA (Carbon dioxide in the Atlantic Ocean).

=== Interventions to add alkalinity ===
Some carbon removal techniques add alkalinity to the ocean and therefore immediately buffer pH changes which might help the organisms in the region that the extra alkalinity is added to. The two technologies that fall into this category are ocean alkalinity enhancement and electrochemical methods. Eventually, due to diffusion, that alkalinity addition will be quite small to distant waters. This is why the term local ocean acidification mitigation is used. Both of these technologies have the potential to operate on a large scale and to be efficient at removing carbon dioxide. However, they are expensive, have many risks and side effects, and currently have a low technology readiness level.

== See also ==
- Alkali soils
- Base (chemistry)
- Biological pump
- Dealkalization of water
- Global Ocean Data Analysis Project
