= Ocean Data View =

Ocean Data View (ODV) is a proprietary, freely available, software package for the analysis and visualization of oceanographic and meteorological data sets.

ODV is used by a large number of oceanographers. The UNESCO Ocean Teacher project employs ODV as one of its main analysis and display tools. ODV is used to display and analyze data from several oceanographic projects such as Argo, World Ocean Circulation Experiment, World Ocean Database Project, SeaDataNet, World Ocean Atlas, and Medar/Medatlas projects. Ocean Data View includes also options that permit to perform objective analysis thanks to the add-on DIVA software.
