= ODV =

ODV may refer to:

- Omni Directional Vehicle, a ground support utility vehicle
- Ocean Data View, a software package for the analysis and visualization of oceanographic and meteorological data sets
- Optimized deprival valuation, a form of deprival valuation applied to electricity sector regulation in New Zealand
