= Joint Global Ocean Flux Study =

International research programme

The Joint Global Ocean Flux Study (JGOFS) was an international research programme on the fluxes of carbon between the atmosphere and ocean, and within the ocean interior. Initiated by the Scientific Committee on Oceanic Research (SCOR), the programme ran from 1987 to 2003, and became one of the early core projects of the International Geosphere-Biosphere Programme (IGBP).

The overarching goal of JGOFS was to advance the understanding of, as well as improve the measurement of, the biogeochemical processes underlying the exchange of carbon across the air—sea interface and within the ocean. The programme aimed to study these processes from regional to global spatial scales, and from seasonal to interannual temporal scales, and to establish their sensitivity to external drivers such as climate change.

Early in the programme in 1988, two long-term time-series projects were established in the Atlantic and Pacific basins. These — Bermuda Atlantic Time-series Study (BATS) and Hawaii Ocean Time-series (HOT) — continue to make observations of ocean hydrography, chemistry and biology to the present-day. In 1989, JGOFS undertook the multinational North Atlantic Bloom Experiment (NABE) to investigate and characterise the annual spring bloom of phytoplankton, a key feature in the carbon cycle of the open ocean.

An important aspect of JGOFS lay in its objective to develop an increased network of observations, made using routine procedures, and curated such that they were easily available to researchers. JGOFS also oversaw the development of models of the marine system based on understanding gained from its observational programme.

== See also ==
- Biological pump
- Geochemical Ocean Sections Study (GEOSECS)
- Global Ocean Data Analysis Project (GLODAP)
- Global Ocean Ecosystem Dynamics (GLOBEC)
- Solubility pump
- World Ocean Atlas (WOA)
- World Ocean Circulation Experiment (WOCE)
