= SeaDataNet =

International oceanography project

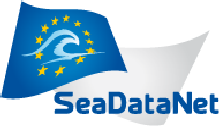
Logo of SeaDataNet project

SeaDataNet is an international project of oceanography. Its main goal is to enable the scientific community to access historical datasets owned by national data centers.

== Description ==
This project aims to provide a web service permitting to retrieve validated datasets (temperature, oxygen, salinity, nutrients, etc.) from 45 different National Data Centers of 35 countries having coasts along European seas. Therefore SeaDataNet is a standardized system for managing the large and diverse data sets collected by the oceanographic fleets and the automatic observation systems. Additional objectives consist in creating product with aggregated data such as climatological descriptions. This European funded project has started in 2004, the project is currently in its second phase with fundings for 2012 to 2016. Most of the datasets are free of access, but some are restricted to institutes. In term of harmonization SeaDataNet has chosen standards, vocabularies, tools that are used in the different NODC(National Oceanographic Data Center). For example they use Ocean Data View to validate or visualize datasets, they also use DIVA software to perform objective analysis. Datasets are covering the years 1800 up to 2012. In 2012 400 data originators are registered into Seadatanet project.

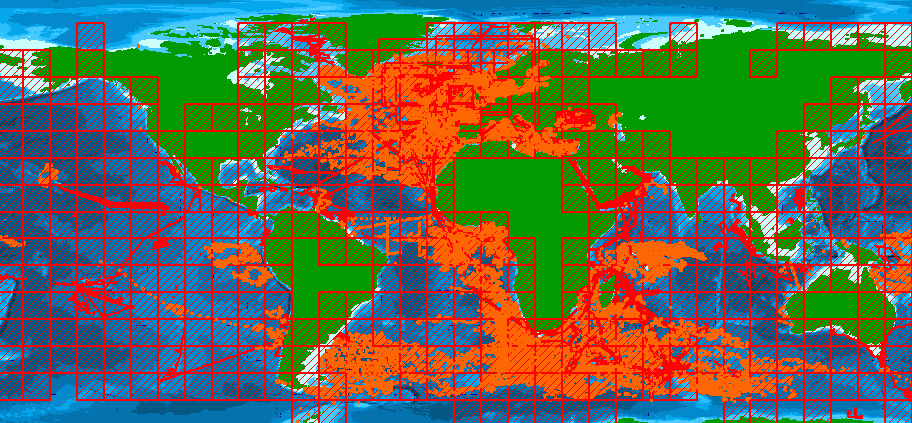
result of a request on datasets within SeaDataNet through Common Data Index web application

== Usage ==
Users of SeaDataNet who want to retrieve datasets coming from multiple Data Centers log to the Common Data Index web-service to define their request. They can provide many details such as the type of platform wanted, the parameter wanted, the rate of sampling, the position, the originator country, etc. Then users send their request, the request is analysed and split into as much request as there are data centers concerned. At the end the user receive an email giving a FTP address where to retrieve all the data ordered in the file format wanted (ASCII, NetCDF or Ocean Data View format).
