= North Pacific Marine Science Organization =

The North Pacific Marine Science Organization (referring to the organization's status as a Pacific version of the International Council for the Exploration of the Sea), is an intergovernmental organization that promotes and coordinates marine scientific research in the North Pacific Ocean and provides a mechanism for information and data exchange among scientists in its member countries.

== Legal framework ==
PICES is an international intergovernmental organization established under a Convention for a North Pacific Marine Science Organization. The Convention entered into force on 1992-03-24 with an initial membership that included the governments of Canada, Japan, and the United States of America. The Convention was ratified by the People's Republic of China on 1992-08-31 to increase membership to four countries. Although the Soviet Union had participated in the development of the Convention, it was not ratified there until 1994-12-16, by the Russian Federation. The Republic of Korea acceded to the Convention on 1995-7-30. The Republic of Mexico and the Democratic People's Republic of Korea are located within the Convention Area (generally north of 30°N) but are not members.

== Oversight ==
A Governing Council consisting of up to two delegates appointed by each member country is the primary decision-making body. Day-to-day operations of the organization are managed by the staff of the PICES Secretariat, located in Canada at the Institute of Ocean Sciences (located on Patricia Bay in British Columbia).

== History ==
The idea to create a Pacific version of ICES (International Council for the Exploration of the Sea) was first discussed by scientists from Canada, Japan, the Soviet Union, and the United States who were attending a conference, sponsored by the United Nations Food and Agriculture Organization, in Vancouver, British Columbia, Canada in February 1973. ICES had provided a forum since 1902 for scientists bordering the Atlantic Ocean and its marginal seas to exchange information, conduct joint research, publish their results, and provide scientific advice about fisheries, primarily in the North Atlantic.

In recognition of its Atlantic heritage, the nickname PICES (Pacific ICES) was adopted for the North Pacific Marine Science Organization. Informal meetings of proponents occurred sporadically through the 1980s, eventually entraining government officials into the discussion in the mid-1980s. The final text of a convention for a new marine science organization was endorsed in Ottawa, Canada on 1990-12-12. A scientific planning meeting was held in Seattle, USA in December 1991 to prepare for decisions made at the first annual meeting in October 1992 in Victoria, British Columbia, Canada.

== Mandate ==
The primary mandate of the organization is to promote and to coordinate marine scientific research in the North Pacific Ocean and to provide a mechanism for information and data exchange among scientists in its member countries. This has been achieved through various means, but primarily by establishing major integrative scientific programs such as the PICES/GLOBEC Scientific Program on Carrying Capacity and Climate Change. The alignment of PICES with a global research program (GLOBEC) in the mid-1990s was fundamental to building the reputation of the organization in the international scientific community. Research on climate and marine ecosystem variability, global warming, ocean acidification and related topics was about to explode in the 1990s, and PICES was strategically in a position to take a significant role in exploring how oceans, atmospheres, and their biota were affected by the changes.

A fundamental difference between PICES and ICES was a much lower priority on developing assessments of fisheries and fish stocks. International borders are much farther apart in the North Pacific compared to the northeastern Atlantic, so coastal fisheries that might compete are separated by large distances involving fewer countries. As a result, transboundary and straddling stock issues generally tend to be managed bilaterally, rather than multilaterally in the North Pacific. Research on fish stocks in PICES has generally been directed toward environmental influences on species. This has produced a natural synergy with ICES as the expertise on different topics of fisheries science has developed.

== Committees ==
Since its creation, the primary scientific directions of the organization have stemmed from its scientific committees (biological oceanography, fishery science, physical oceanography and climate, marine environmental quality, and human dimensions) supported by two technical committees (data exchange and monitoring).

Each committee has authority to create subsidiary expert groups, with the approval of the Governing Council, to undertake the scientific work of the committees. National membership of all committees and other expert groups is determined by the delegates of each member country. Committee chairmen serve on the PICES Science Board, which is responsible for authorizing and overseeing all scientific activities of the organization.

== Scientific programs ==
To facilitate cooperative research on important topics by marine scientists in member countries, PICES established two major integrative scientific programs during its first two decades. From 1995 to 2006, the PICES/GLOBEC regional programme on Climate Change and Carrying Capacity sought to improve understanding of climate variation in the North Pacific, its effect on marine ecosystems, and the productive capacity of the ocean. An important outcome of the work was learning that decadal-scale variation is dominant in the North Pacific, to the point where long-term changes are difficult to detect

The second program on Forecasting and Understanding Trends, Uncertainty and Responses of North Pacific Marine Ecosystems (FUTURE) began in October 2009. Its primary goals are to understand how marine ecosystems in the North Pacific respond to climate change and human activities, to provide forecasts of ecosystem status, and to communicate the results of the program broadly.

== Special Projects ==
From time to time, member countries have asked PICES to undertake scientific studies on a particular topic of special interest to them. These differ from the regular work of the expert groups because incremental funding is typically provided to the organization to conduct the work. Recent examples, funding sources, and links to their products are listed here:

- climate regime shifts (U.S.A.)
- harmful algal blooms (Japan)
- invasive marine species (Japan)
- survival of Fraser River sockeye salmon (Canada)
- Marine ecosystem health and human well-being (Japan)
- Assessing the debris-related impacts from the tsunami (Japan)
- Building local warning networks for the detection and human dimension of Ciguatera fish poisoning in Indonesian communities (Japan)
- Sea turtle ecology in relation to environmental stressors in the North Pacific region (Korea)

== Ecosystem status reporting ==
Recognizing the need to understand and to communicate information on variability in marine ecosystems among member countries, PICES initiated a pilot project in 2002 that would result in the publication of its first ecosystem status report. Thereafter, ocean climate and marine ecosystem reporting was seen as an important function of the organization so it continued with an extensive update. This version placed greater emphasis on basin-scale comparisons, the primary scale of interest of the organization, but the cost and effort that was required to create such a document led to simplifications. Future versions will feature greater use of automation and technology, with printed versions appearing less frequently.

== Global collaboration ==
During its first decade, PICES became a major international forum for exchanging results and discussing climatic-oceanic-biotic research in the North Pacific. Awareness of the benefits of working cooperatively on scientific problems led to increasing collaboration with like-minded organizations in the North Pacific. The first occasion where PICES had a leadership role was the Beyond El Niño Conference (La Jolla, USA – 2000). The results of the conference appeared in the largest special issue of Progress in Oceanography ever published In the years that followed, PICES partnered with ICES, IOC, SCOR, and others to build its scientific and organizational reputations.

== Capacity building ==
Capacity building is a high priority activity in PICES and in many other organizations. Initially, PICES focused on the need to develop capacity in those member countries with developing economies, or economies in transition. The primary goals are now focused on developing young scientific talents in all member countries. This is achieved through an intern program at the Secretariat, early career scientist conferences, summer schools, travel grants to allow participation in the PICES Annual Meeting, sponsoring speakers at international conferences, and awards and recognition of deserving early career scientists.

== Officers ==
=== Chairman ===
1. Warren Wooster (USA, 1992–1996)
2. William Doubleday (Canada, 1996–1998)
3. Hyung Tack Huh (Korea, 1998–2002)
4. Vera Alexander (USA, 2002–2006)
5. Tokio Wada (Japan, 2006–2010)
6. Lev Bocharov (Russia, 2010–2012)
7. Laura Richards (Canada, 2012–2016)
8. Chul Park (Korea, 2016–2020)
9. Enrique Curchitser (USA, 2020-)

=== Executive secretary ===
1. Douglas McKone (Canada, 1993–1998)
2. Alexander Bychkov (Russia, 1999–2014)
3. Robin Brown (Canada, 2015–2020)
4. Sonia Batten (Canada, 2020-)

=== Deputy executive secretary ===
1. Motoyasu Miyata (Japan, 1992–1996)
2. Alexander Bychkov (Russia, 1996–1999)
3. Stewart M. McKinnell (Canada, 1999–2014)
4. Harold P. Batchelder (USA, 2014–2021)
5. Sanae Chiba (Japan, 2021-)
