= Isohydric principle =

Multiple acid/base pairs in equilibrium

The isohydric principle is the phenomenon whereby multiple acid/base pairs in solution will be in equilibrium with one another, tied together by their common reagent: the hydrogen ion and hence, the pH of solution. That is, when several buffers are present together in the same solution, they are all exposed to the same hydrogen ion activity. Hence, the pK of each buffer will dictate the ratio of the concentrations of its base and weak acid forms at the given pH, in accordance with the Henderson-Hasselbalch equation.

Any condition that changes the balance of one of the buffer systems, also changes the balance of all the others because the buffer systems actually buffer one another by shifting hydrogen ions back and forth from one to the other.

The isohydric principle has special relevance to in vivo biochemistry where multiple acid/ base pairs are in solution. The simplifying isohydric principle gives two important concepts. First, all of the buffers in a multiple-buffered system contribute to pH of the system. Secondly, the pH (at equilibrium) can be calculated from an individual buffer system regardless of other buffers present. That is, in vivo, knowing the concentration of pCO_{2} (weak acid) and bicarbonate (conjugate base) and the pKa of that buffer system, the pH can be calculated regardless of the presence of other contributing buffers. The clinical relevance is that arterial blood gas often directly measures the CO_{2} levels and the pH, but the bicarbonate levels are then calculated from that information—without regard to other buffers present
