= Geochemical Ocean Sections Study =

Oceanic chemical survey

- Funding agency: National Science Foundation, US Department of Energy
- Objective: Ocean circulation, Radioisotopes, Biogeochemistry
- Project coordinator: Arnold E. Bainbridge
- Duration: 1970 – 1980

The Geochemical Ocean Sections Study (GEOSECS) was a global survey of the three-dimensional distributions of chemical, isotopic, and radiochemical tracers in the ocean. A key objective was to investigate the deep thermohaline circulation of the ocean, using chemical tracers, including radiotracers, to establish the pathways taken by them.

Measurements included those of physical oceanographic quantities such as temperature, salinity, pressure and density, chemical / biological quantities such as total inorganic carbon, alkalinity, nitrate, phosphate, silicic acid, oxygen and apparent oxygen utilisation (AOU), and radiochemical / isotopic quantities such as carbon-13, carbon-14 and tritium.

== Program history ==
The GEOSECS program began in 1967 when Henry Stommel recognized that geochemical tracers could be used to study marine mixing and circulation patterns. In 1968, Stommel met with Wallace Broecker, Harmon Craig, and Karl Karekin Turekian to discuss and plan the formation of a geochemical ocean program. The group grew over the following year, with an initial GEOSECS panel of:

- Wallace Broecker (Lamont-Doherty)
- Harmon Craig (Scripps)
- H. Gote Ostlund (University of Miami)
- P. Kilho Park (Oregon State University)
- Joseph Reid (Scripps)
- Derek Spencer (Woods Hole)
- Henry Stommel (MIT)
- Taro Takahashi (Lamont-Doherty)
- Karl Turekian (Yale)
- Herbert Volchock (Atomic Energy Commission)

Arnold E. Bainbridge of Scripps was selected as the GEOSECS Operations Group director and maintained responsibility for shipboard operations and data processing.

Instrumentation and methodology for science at sea were developed during a series of preliminary cruises from 1969-1972. It was on the practice run of Scripp's Antipode Expedition (Leg 15) in 1971 that the deep-water Neil Brown CTD was successfully deployed to 5,000 metres (16,000 ft). Continuous CTD data presented an immediate discovery of a density discontinuity between Pacific Deep Water and Antarctic bottom water.

Expeditions undertaken during GEOSECS took place in the Atlantic Ocean from July 1972 to May 1973, in the Pacific Ocean from August 1973 to June 1974, and in the Indian Ocean from December 1977 to March 1978.

== See also ==
- Global Ocean Data Analysis Project (GLODAP)
- Joint Global Ocean Flux Study (JGOFS)
- World Ocean Atlas (WOA)
- World Ocean Circulation Experiment (WOCE)
