= Global Ocean Data Analysis Project =

Synthesis project bringing together biogeochemical oceanographic data

The Global Ocean Data Analysis Project (GLODAP) is a synthesis project bringing together oceanographic data, featuring two major releases as of 2018. The central goal of GLODAP is to generate a global climatology of the World Ocean's carbon cycle for use in studies of both its natural and anthropogenically forced states. GLODAP is funded by the National Oceanic and Atmospheric Administration, the U.S. Department of Energy, and the National Science Foundation.

The first GLODAP release (v1.1) was produced from data collected during the 1990s by research cruises on the World Ocean Circulation Experiment, Joint Global Ocean Flux Study and Ocean-Atmosphere Exchange Study programmes. The second GLODAP release (v2) extended the first using data from cruises from 2000 to 2013. The data is available both as individual "bottle data" from sample sites, and as interpolated fields on a standard longitude, latitude, depth grid.

== Dataset ==
The GLODAPv1.1 climatology contains analysed fields of "present day" (1990s) dissolved inorganic carbon (DIC), alkalinity, carbon-14 (^{14}C), CFC-11 and CFC-12. The fields consist of three-dimensional, objectively-analysed global grids at 1° horizontal resolution, interpolated onto 33 standardised vertical intervals from the surface (0 m) to the abyssal seafloor (5500 m). In terms of temporal resolution, the relative scarcity of the source data mean that, unlike the World Ocean Atlas, averaged fields are only produced for the annual time-scale. The GLODAP climatology is missing data in certain oceanic provinces including the Arctic Ocean, the Caribbean Sea, the Mediterranean Sea and Maritime Southeast Asia.

Additionally, analysis has attempted to separate natural from anthropogenic DIC, to produce fields of pre-industrial (18th century) DIC and "present day" anthropogenic CO_{2}. This separation allows estimation of the magnitude of the ocean sink for anthropogenic CO_{2}, and is important for studies of phenomena such as ocean acidification. However, as anthropogenic DIC is chemically and physically identical to natural DIC, this separation is difficult. GLODAP used a mathematical technique known as C* (C-star) to deconvolute anthropogenic from natural DIC (there are a number of alternative methods). This uses information about ocean biogeochemistry and CO_{2} surface disequilibrium together with other ocean tracers including carbon-14, CFC-11 and CFC-12 (which indicate water mass age) to try to separate out natural CO_{2} from that added during the ongoing anthropogenic transient. The technique is not straightforward and has associated errors, although it is gradually being refined to improve it. Its findings are generally supported by independent predictions made by dynamic models.

The GLODAPv2 climatology largely repeats the earlier format, but makes use of the large number of observations of the ocean's carbon cycle made over the intervening period (2000–2013). The analysed "present-day" fields in the resulting dataset are normalised to year 2002. Anthropogenic carbon was estimated in GLODAPv2 using a "transit-time distribution" (TTD) method (an approach using a Green's function). In addition to updated fields of DIC (total and anthropogenic) and alkalinity, GLODAPv2 includes fields of seawater pH and calcium carbonate saturation state (Ω; omega). The latter is a non-dimensional number calculated by dividing the local carbonate ion concentration by the ambient saturation concentration for calcium carbonate (for the biomineral polymorphs calcite and aragonite), and relates to an oceanographic property, the carbonate compensation depth. Values of this below 1 indicate undersaturation, and potential dissolution, while values above 1 indicate supersaturation, and relative stability.

== Gallery ==
The following panels show sea surface concentrations of fields prepared by GLODAPv1.1. The "pre-industrial" is the 18th century, while "present-day" is approximately the 1990s.

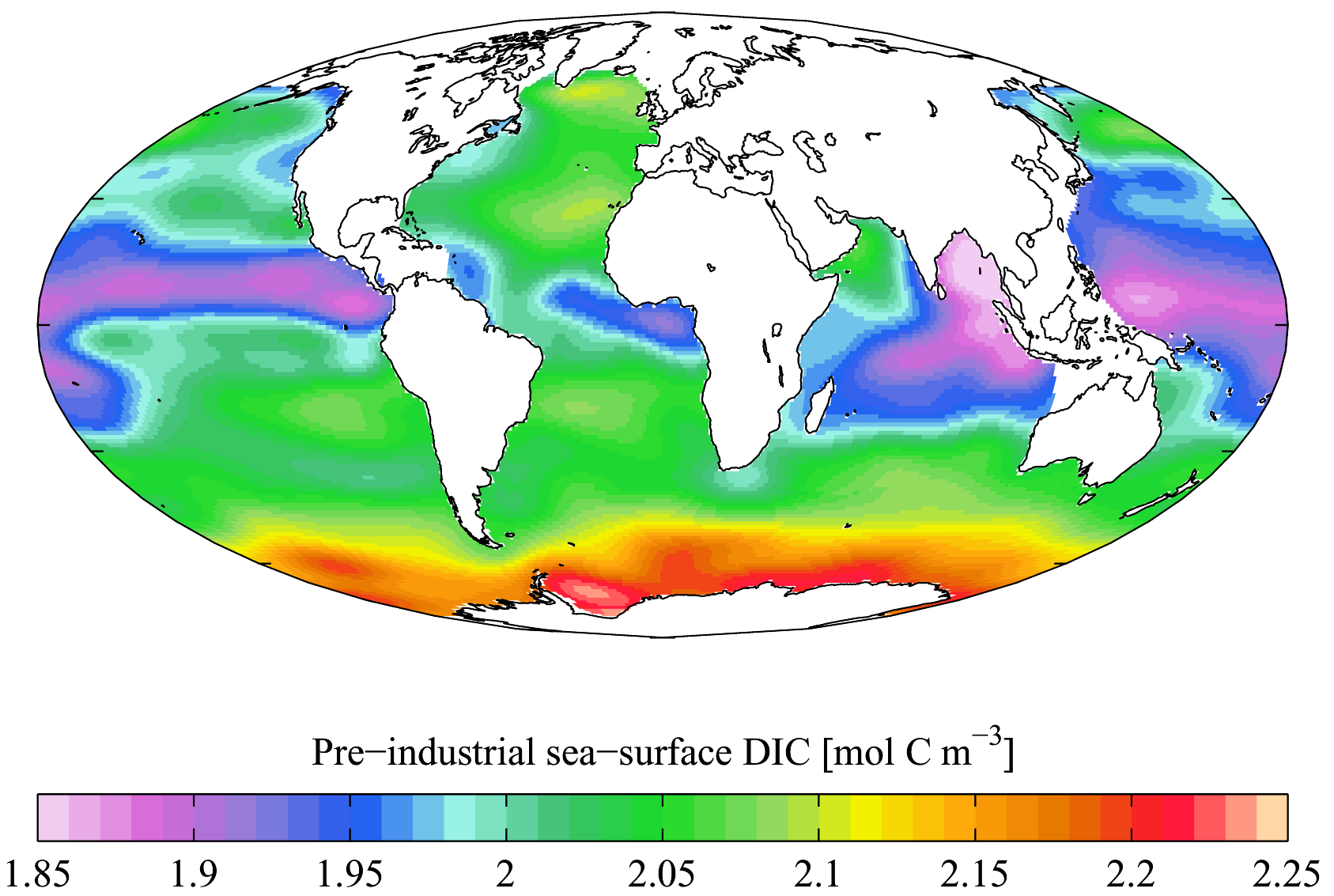
Pre-industrial DIC

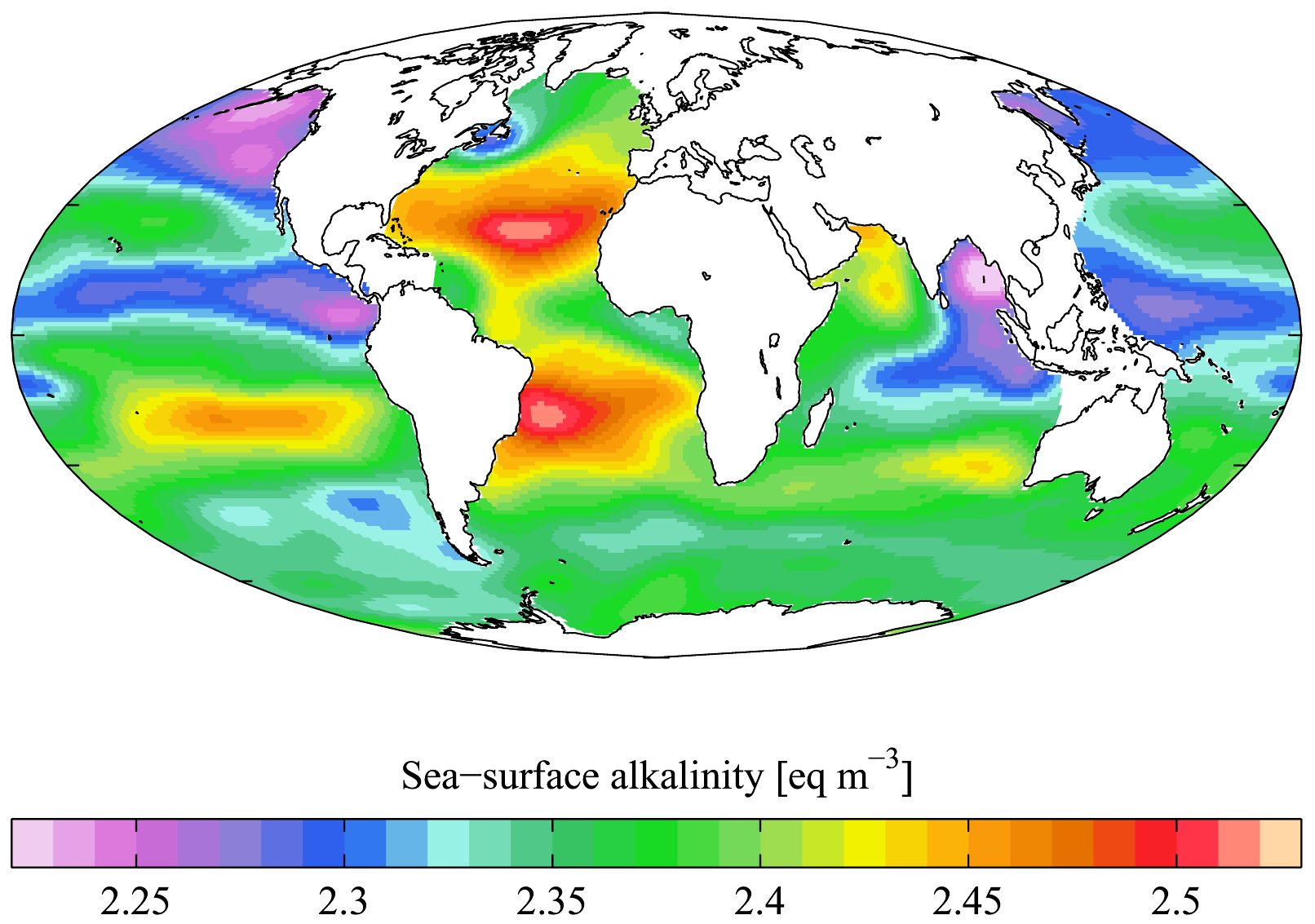
"Present day" alkalinity

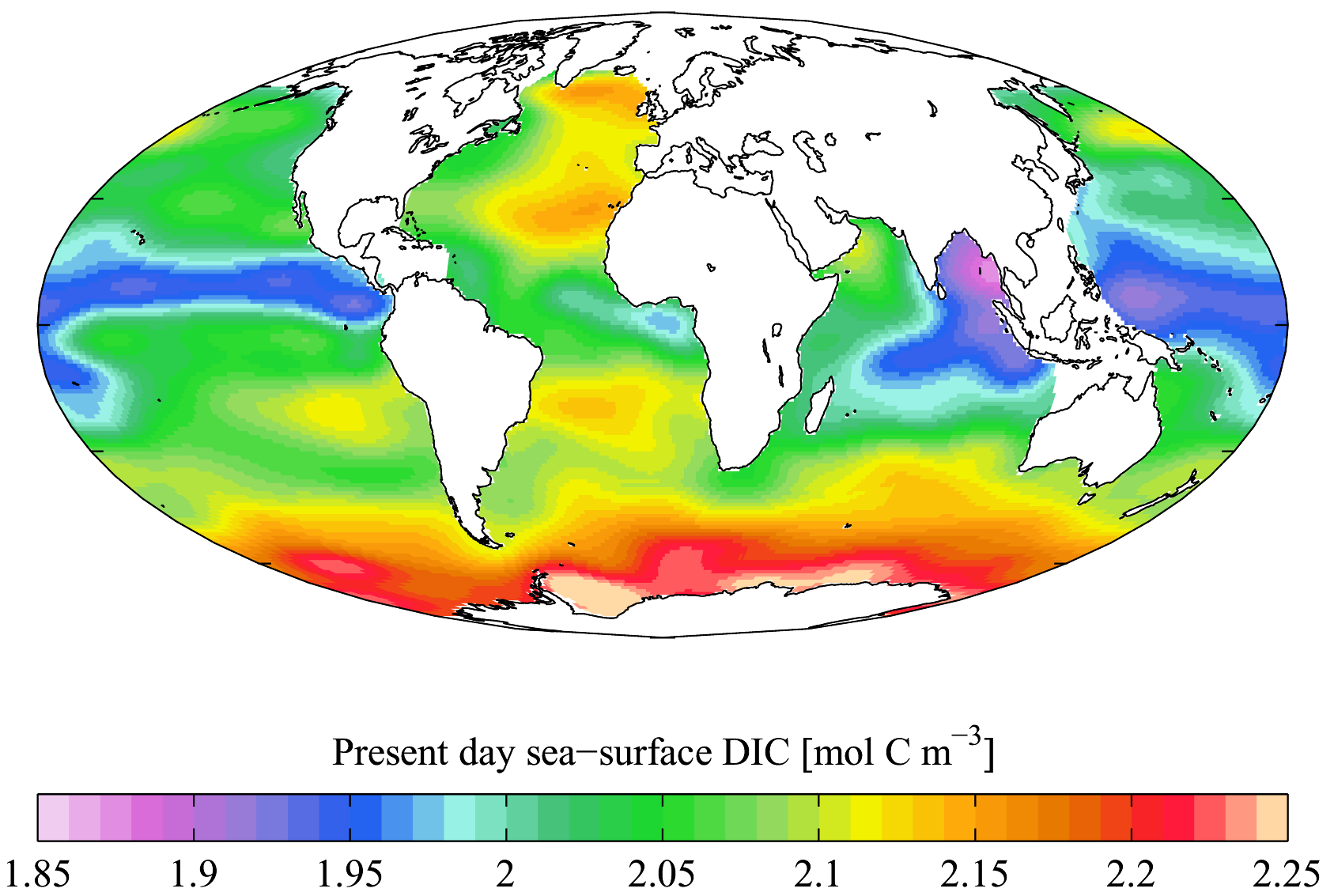
"Present day" DIC

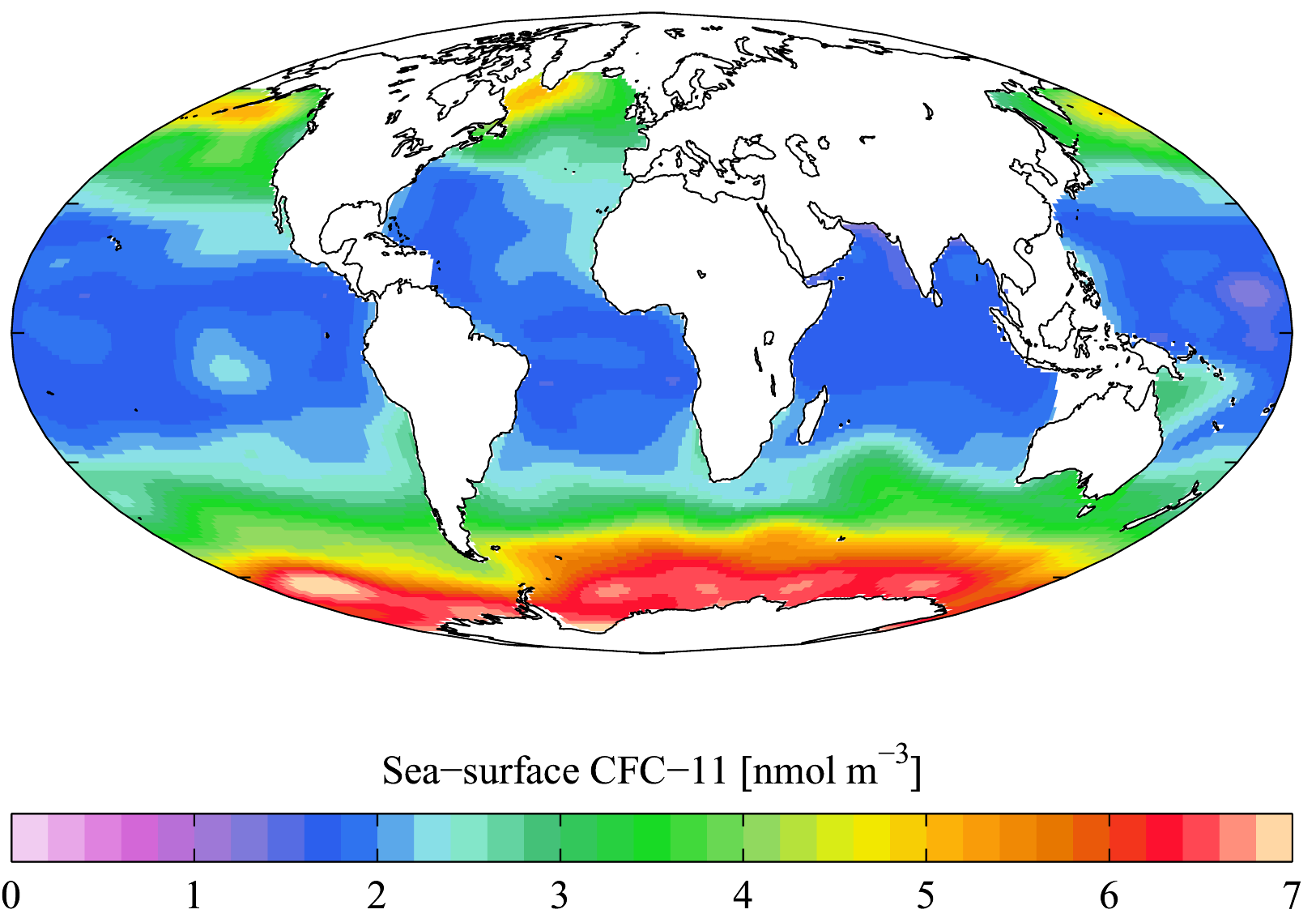
"Present day" CFC-11

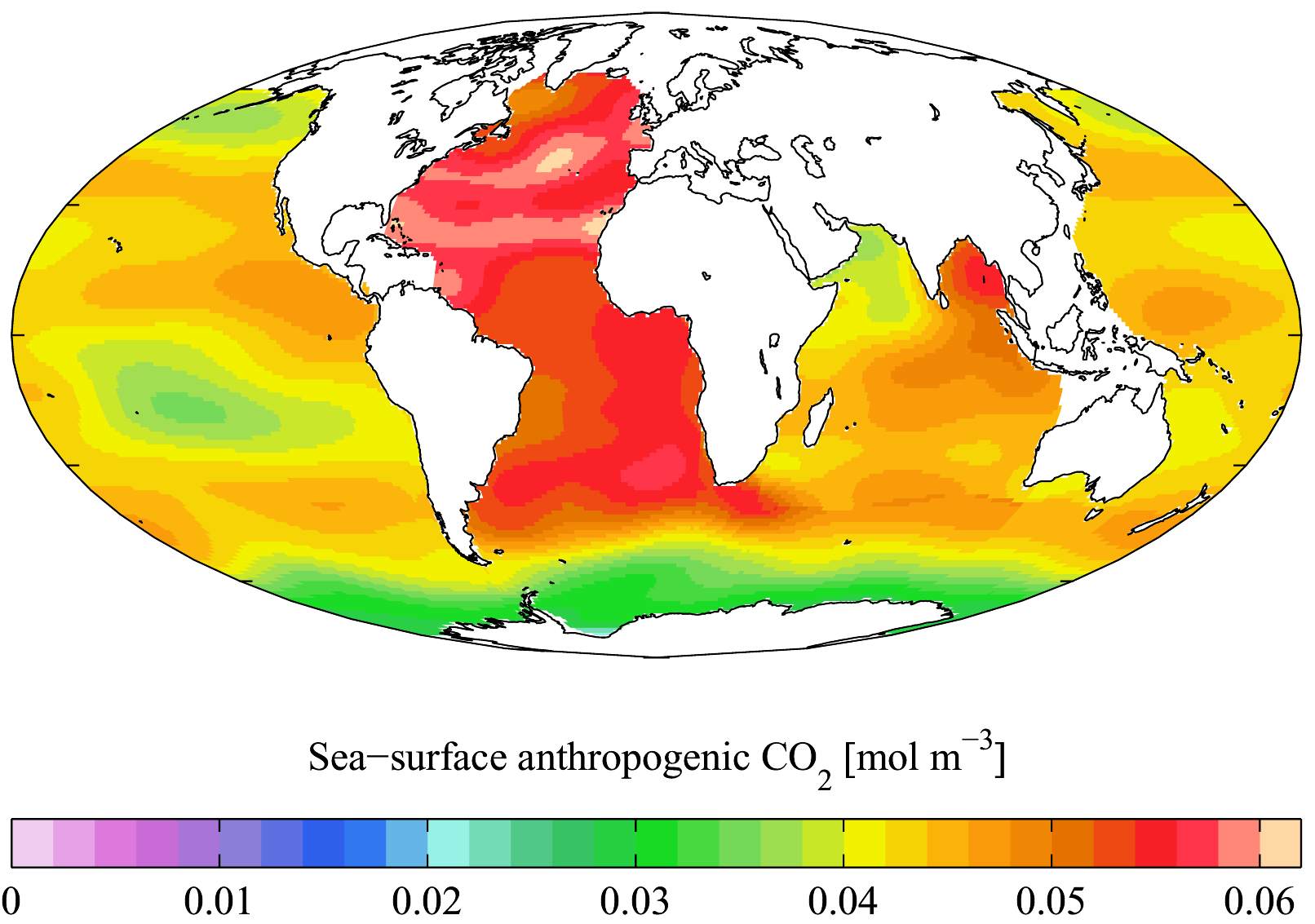
"Present day" anthropogenic CO_{2}

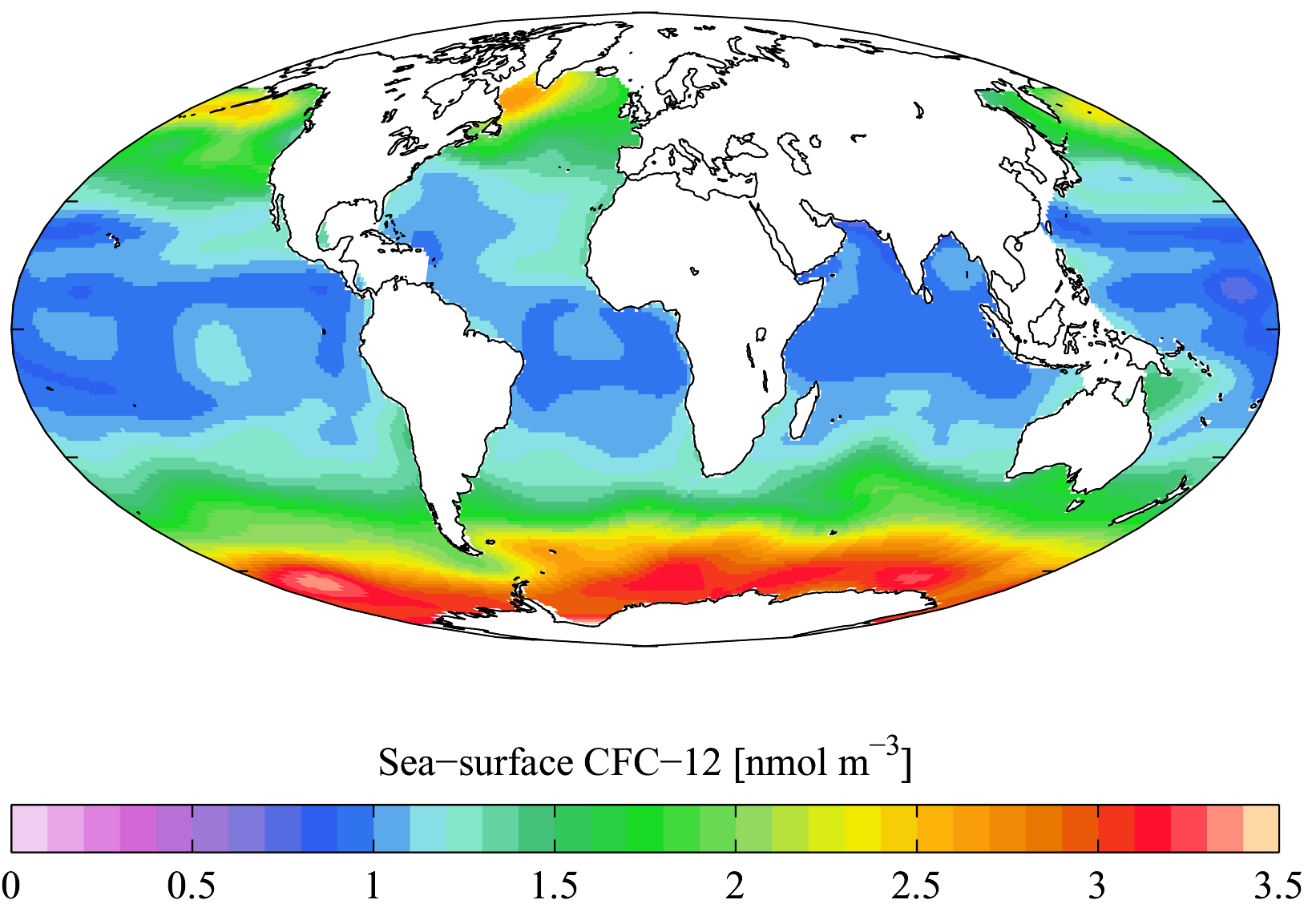
"Present day" CFC-12

The following panels show sea surface concentrations of fields prepared by GLODAPv2. The "pre-industrial" is the 18th century, while "present-day" is normalised to 2002. Note that these properties are shown in mass units (per kilogram of seawater) rather than the volume units (per cubic metre of seawater) used in the GLODAPv1.1 panels.

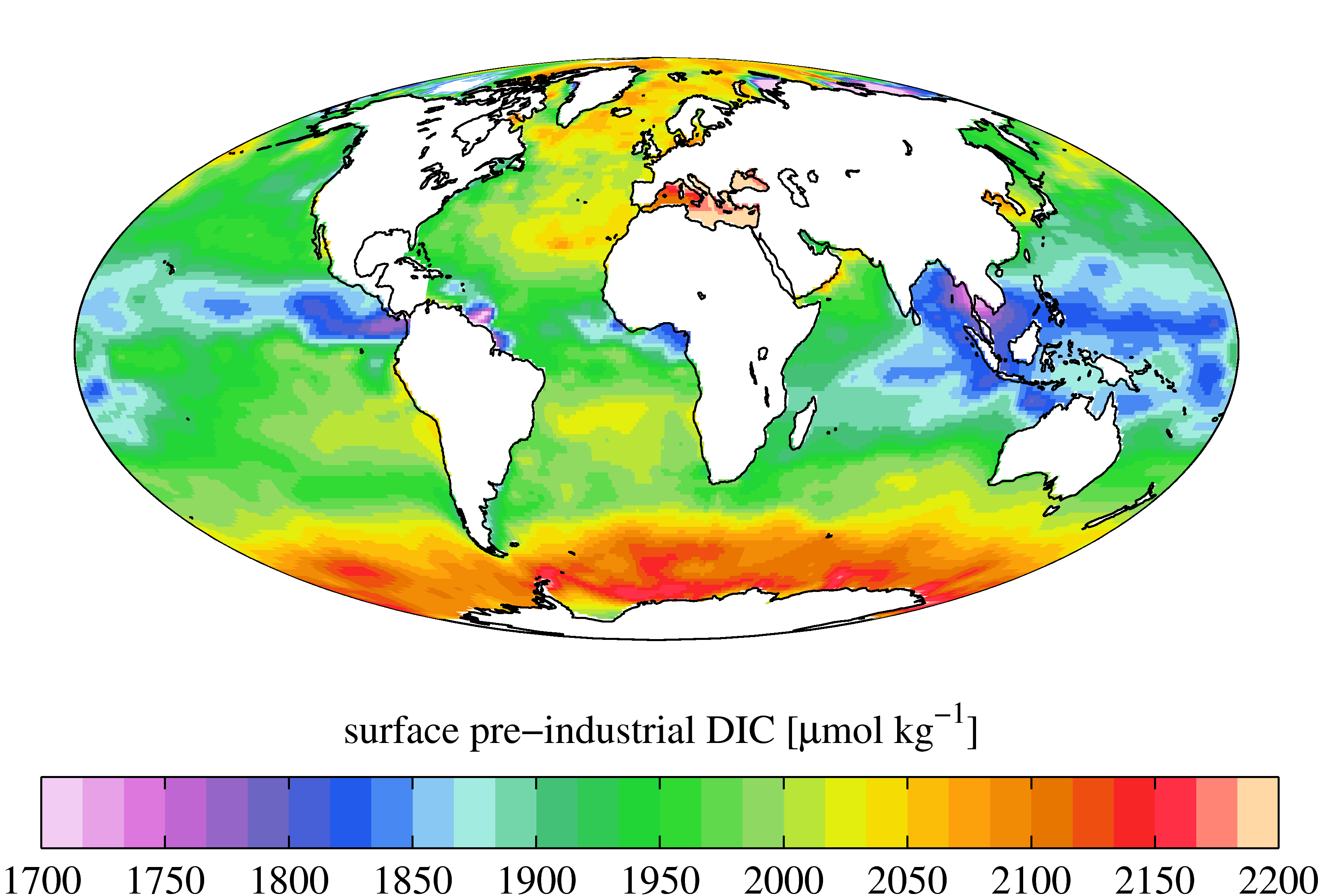
Surface ocean pre-industrial DIC concentration, GLODAPv2

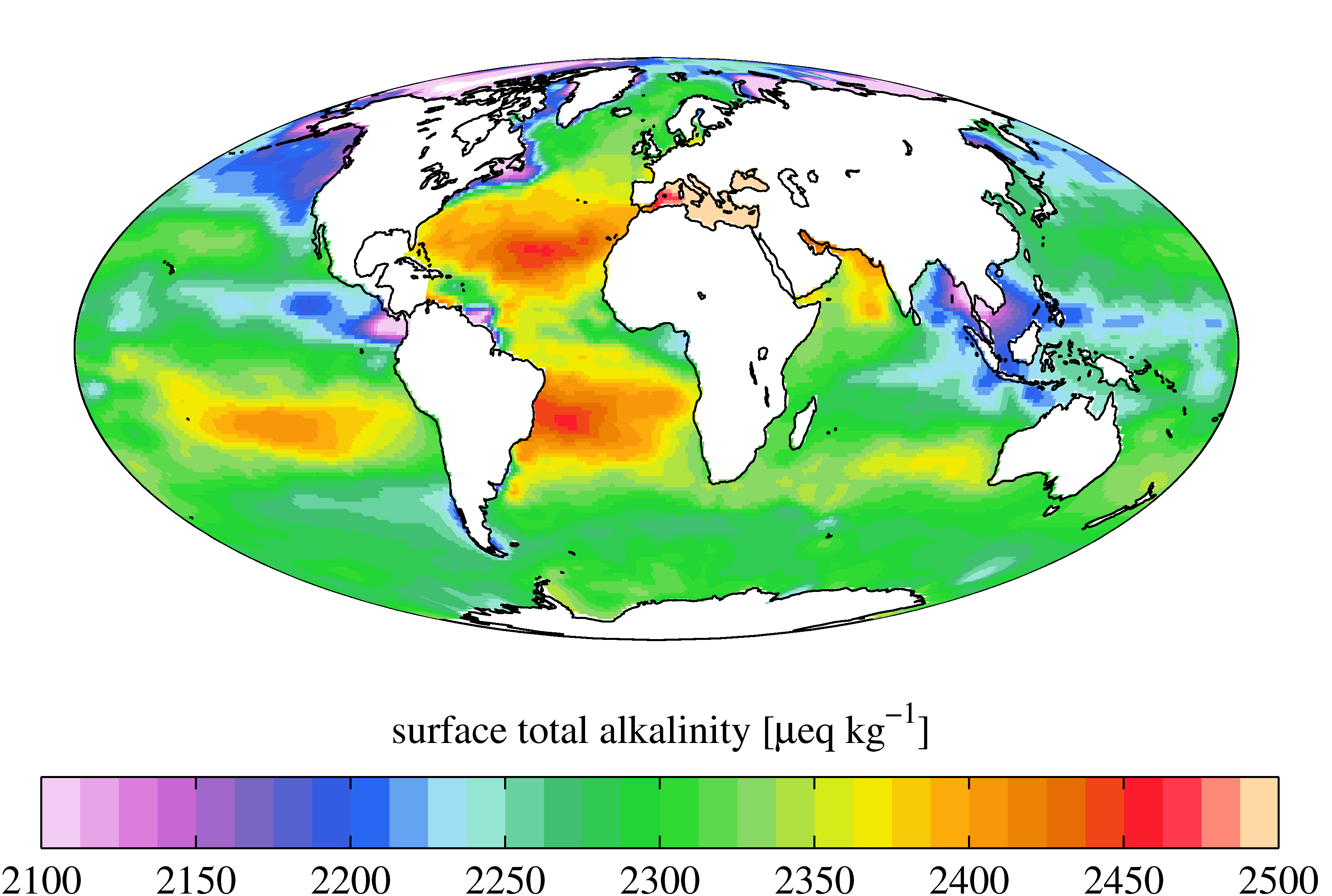
Surface ocean present-day total alkalinity, GLODAPv2

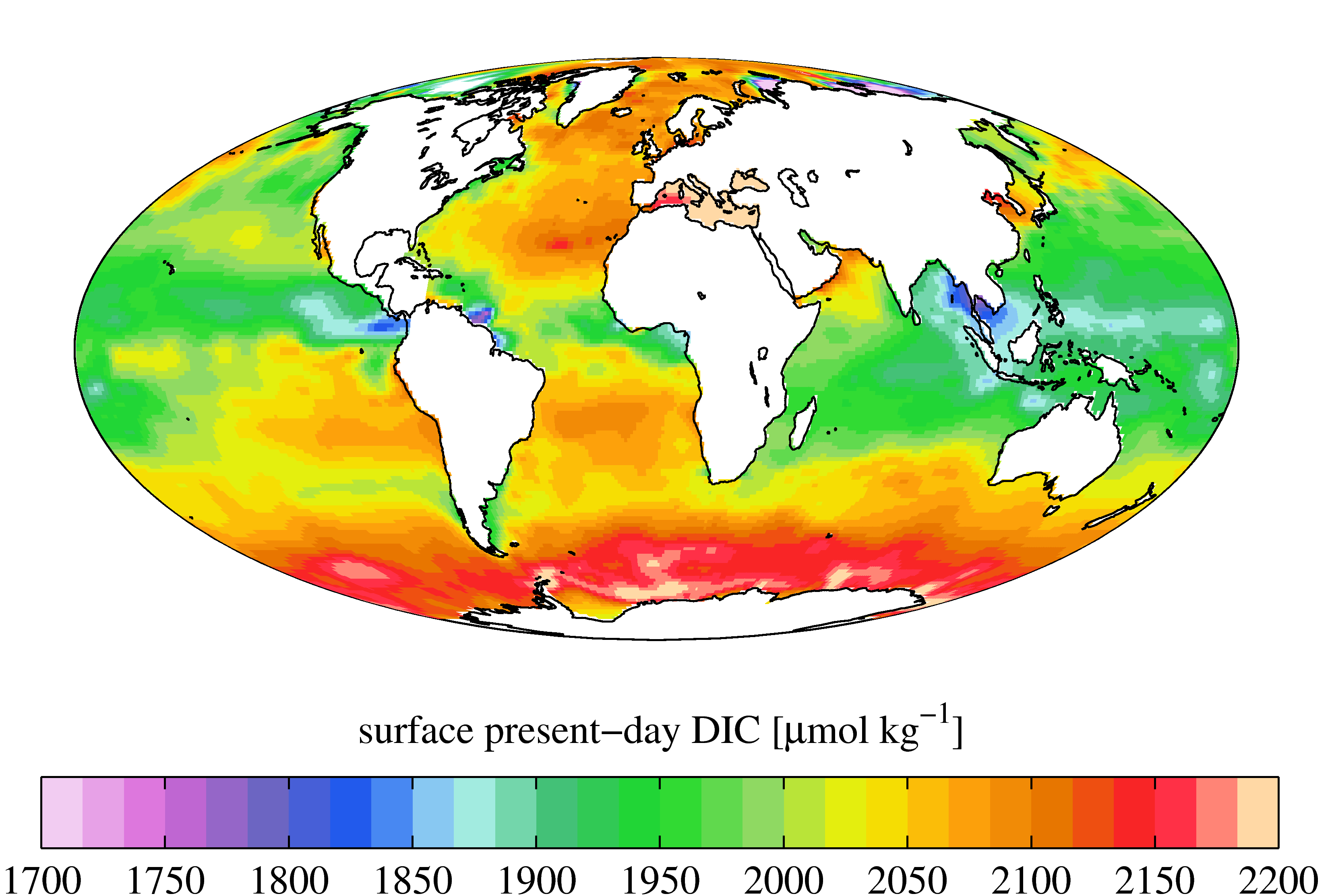
Surface ocean present-day DIC concentration, GLODAPv2

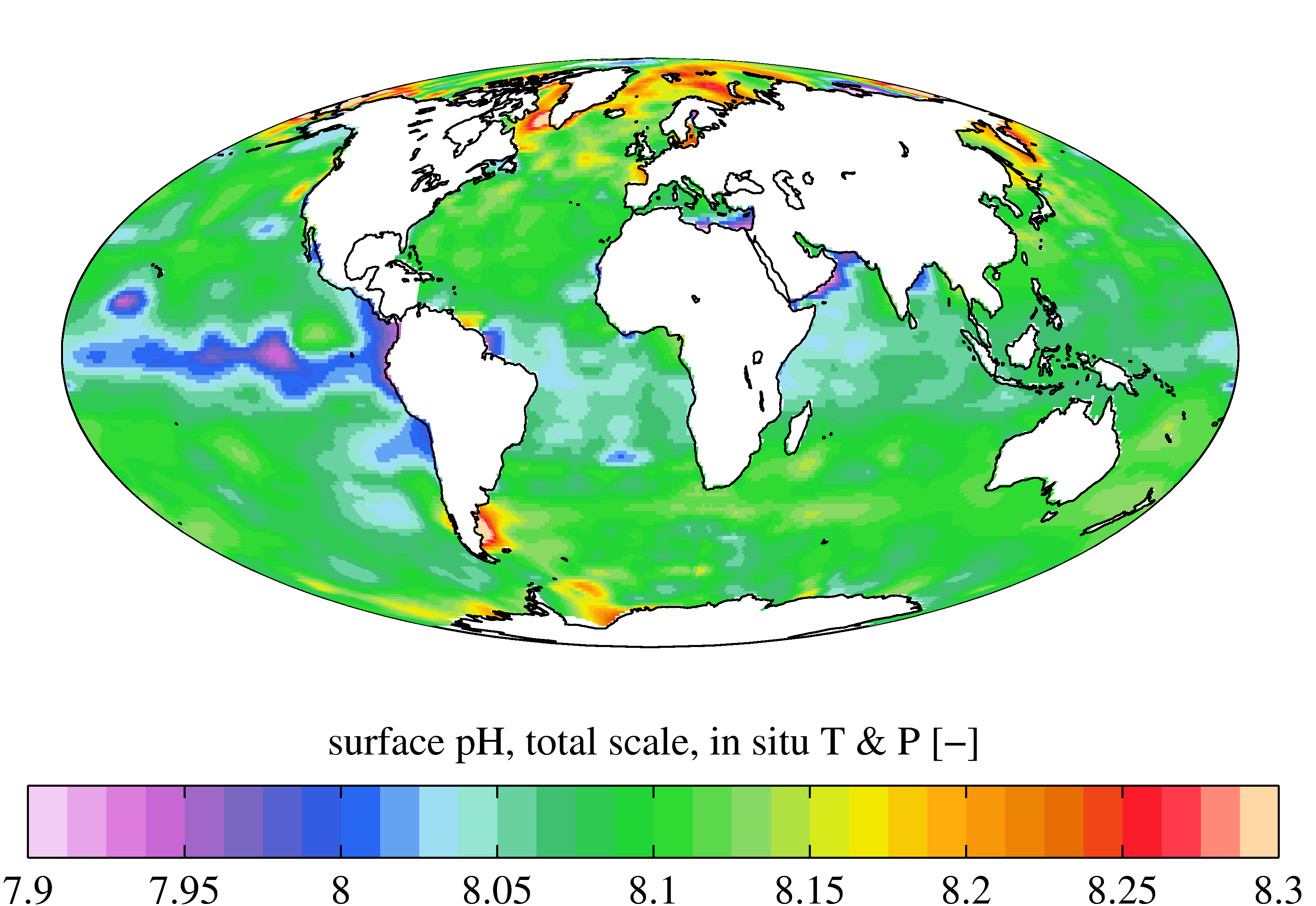
Surface ocean present-day pH, GLODAPv2

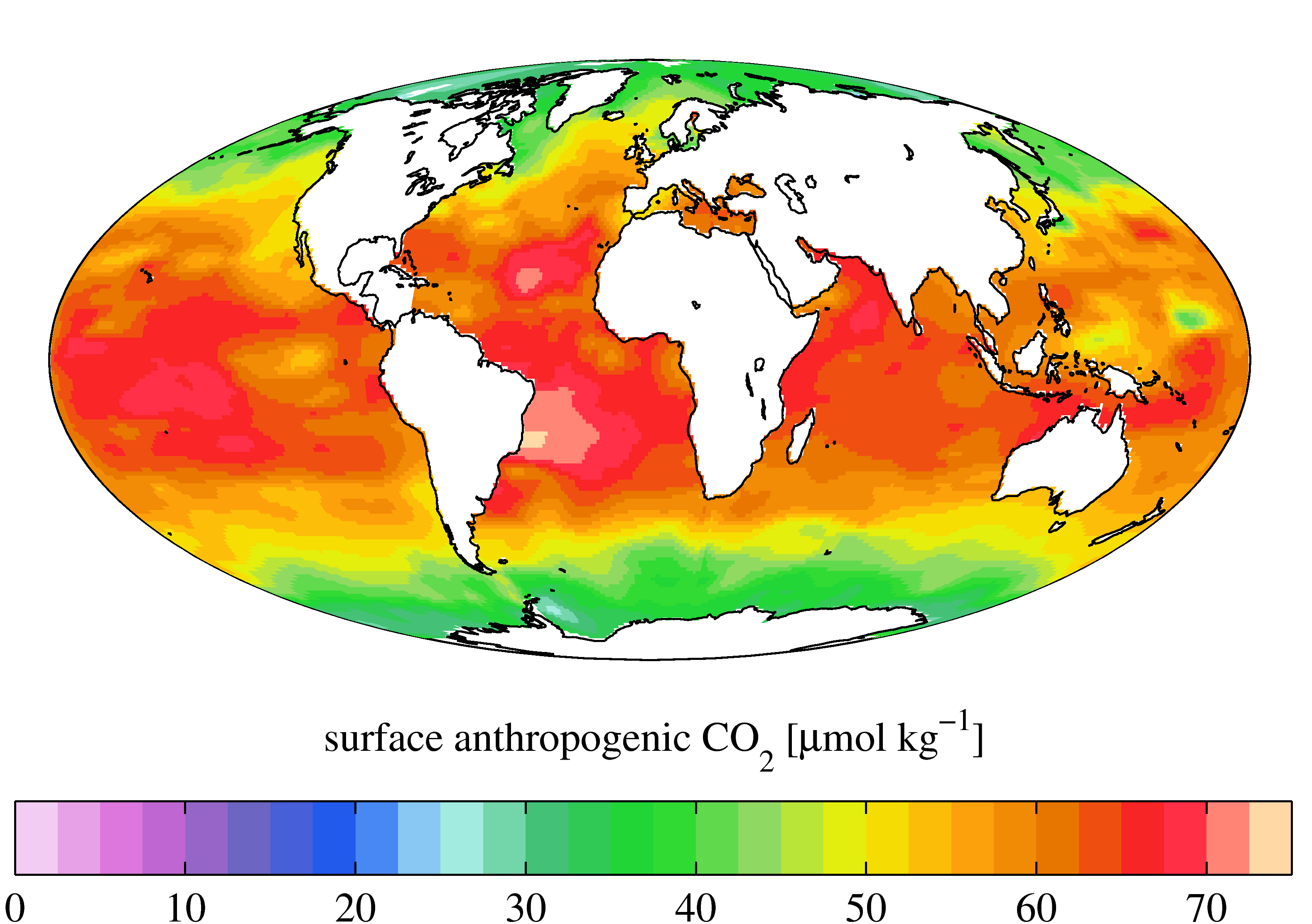
Surface ocean anthropogenic CO2 concentration, GLODAPv2

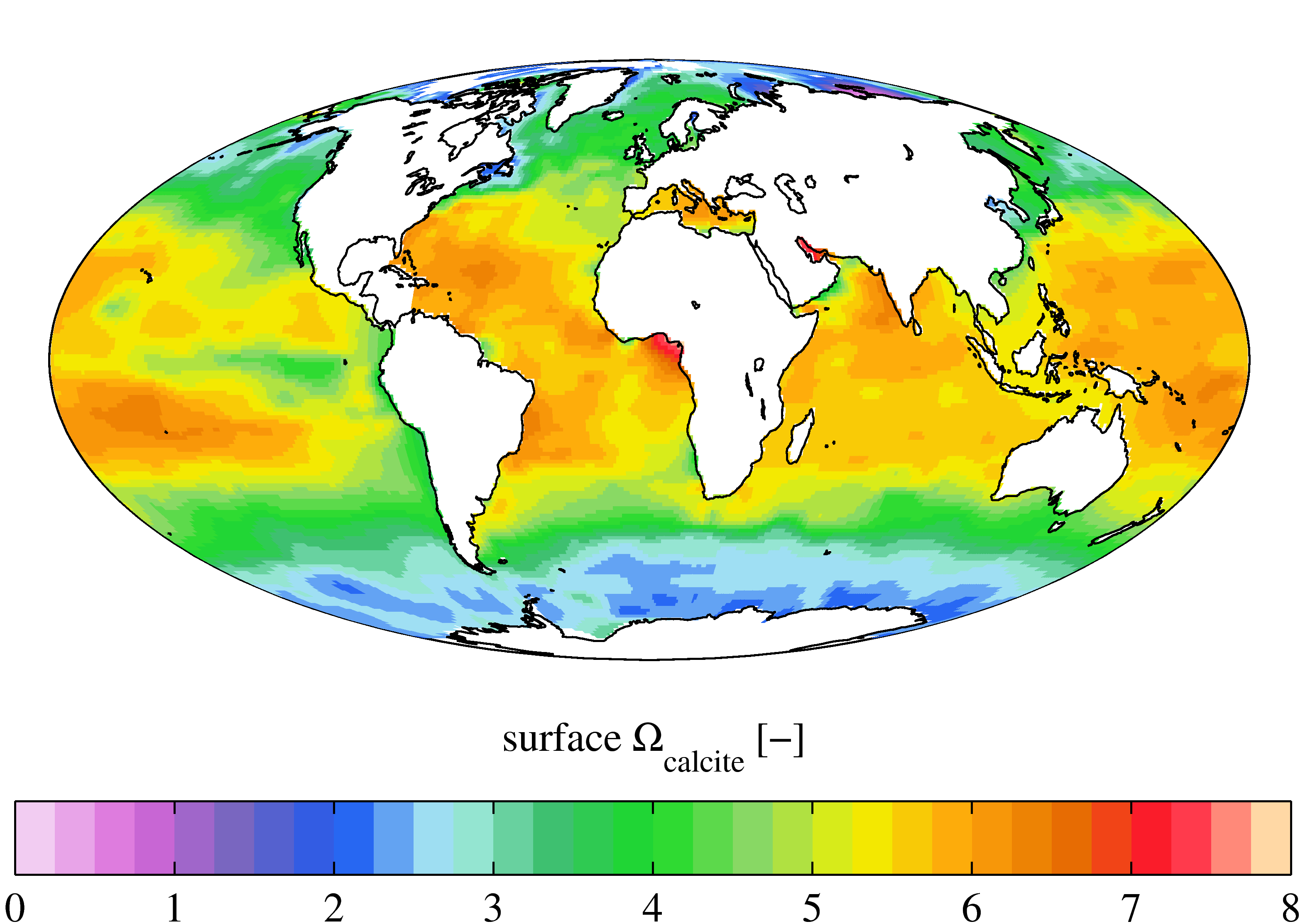
Surface ocean present-day omega calcite, GLODAPv2

== See also ==
- Biogeochemical cycle
- Biological pump
- Continental shelf pump
- Geochemical Ocean Sections Study
- Joint Global Ocean Flux Study
- Ocean acidification
- Solubility pump
- World Ocean Atlas
- World Ocean Circulation Experiment
