= World Ocean Atlas =

Dataset of ocean properties

The World Ocean Atlas (WOA) is a data product of the Ocean Climate Laboratory of the National Centers for Environmental Information (U.S.). The WOA consists of a climatology of fields of in situ ocean properties for the World Ocean. It was first produced in 1994 (based on the earlier Climatological Atlas of the World Ocean, 1982), with later editions at roughly four year intervals in 1998, 2001, 2005, 2009, 2013, 2018, and 2023.

== Dataset ==
The World Ocean Atlas (WOA) is based on profile data from the World Ocean Database (WOD) Project. The fields that make up the WOA dataset consist of objectively-analysed global grids at 1° spatial resolution. The fields are three-dimensional, and data are typically interpolated onto 33 standardised vertical intervals from the surface (0 m) to the abyssal seafloor (5500 m). In terms of temporal resolution, averaged fields are produced for annual, seasonal and monthly time-scales. The WOA fields include ocean temperature, salinity, dissolved oxygen, apparent oxygen utilisation (AOU), percent oxygen saturation, phosphate, silicic acid, and nitrate. Early editions of the WOA additionally included fields such as mixed layer depth and sea surface height.

In addition to the averaged fields of ocean properties, the WOA also contains fields of statistical information concerning the constituent data that the averages were produced from. These include fields such as the number of data points the average is derived from, their standard deviation and standard error. A lower horizontal resolution (5°) version of the WOA is also available. The WOA dataset is primarily available as compressed ASCII, but since WOA 2005 a netCDF version has also been produced.

== Gallery ==
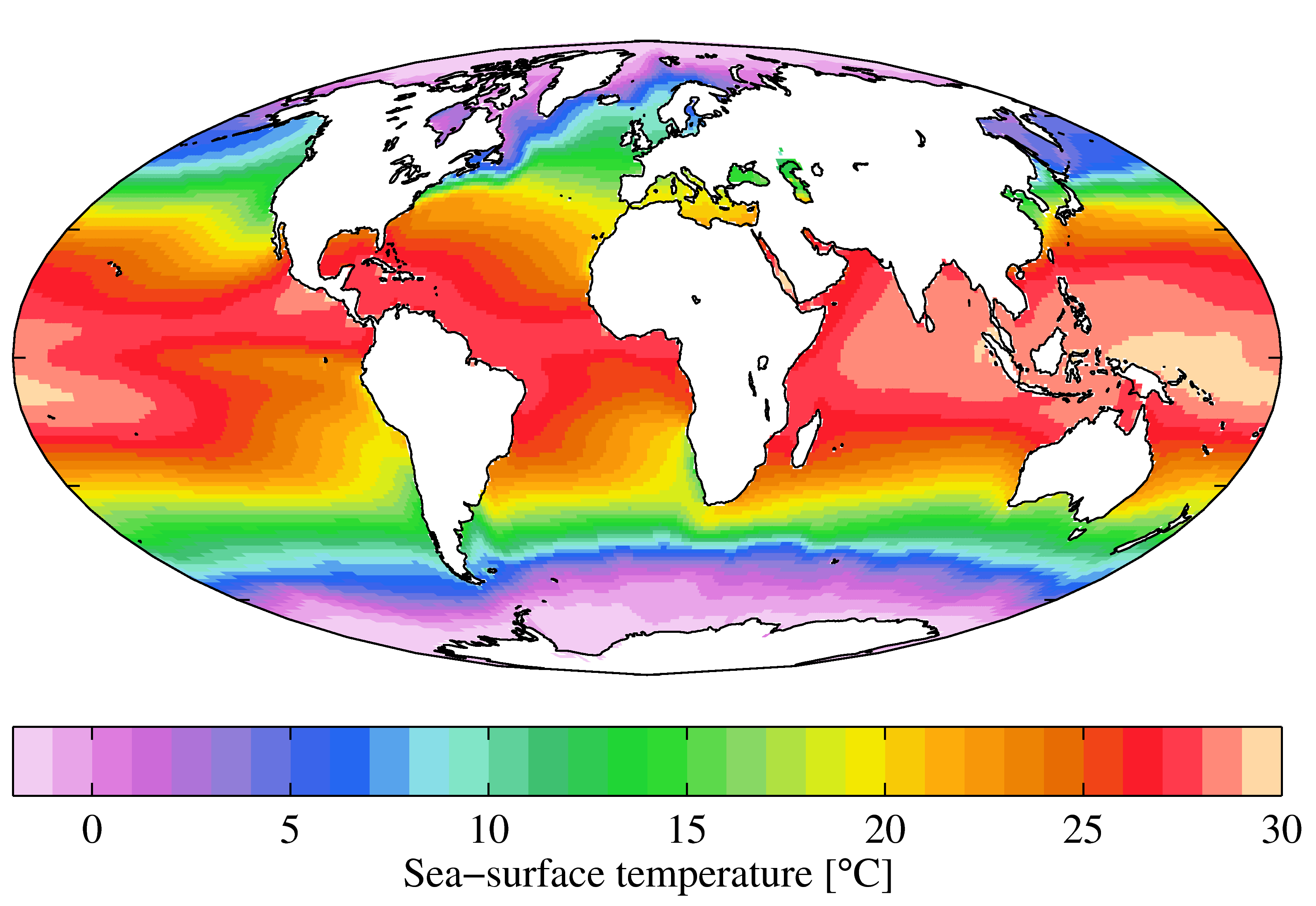
Annual mean sea surface temperature (WOA 2009)

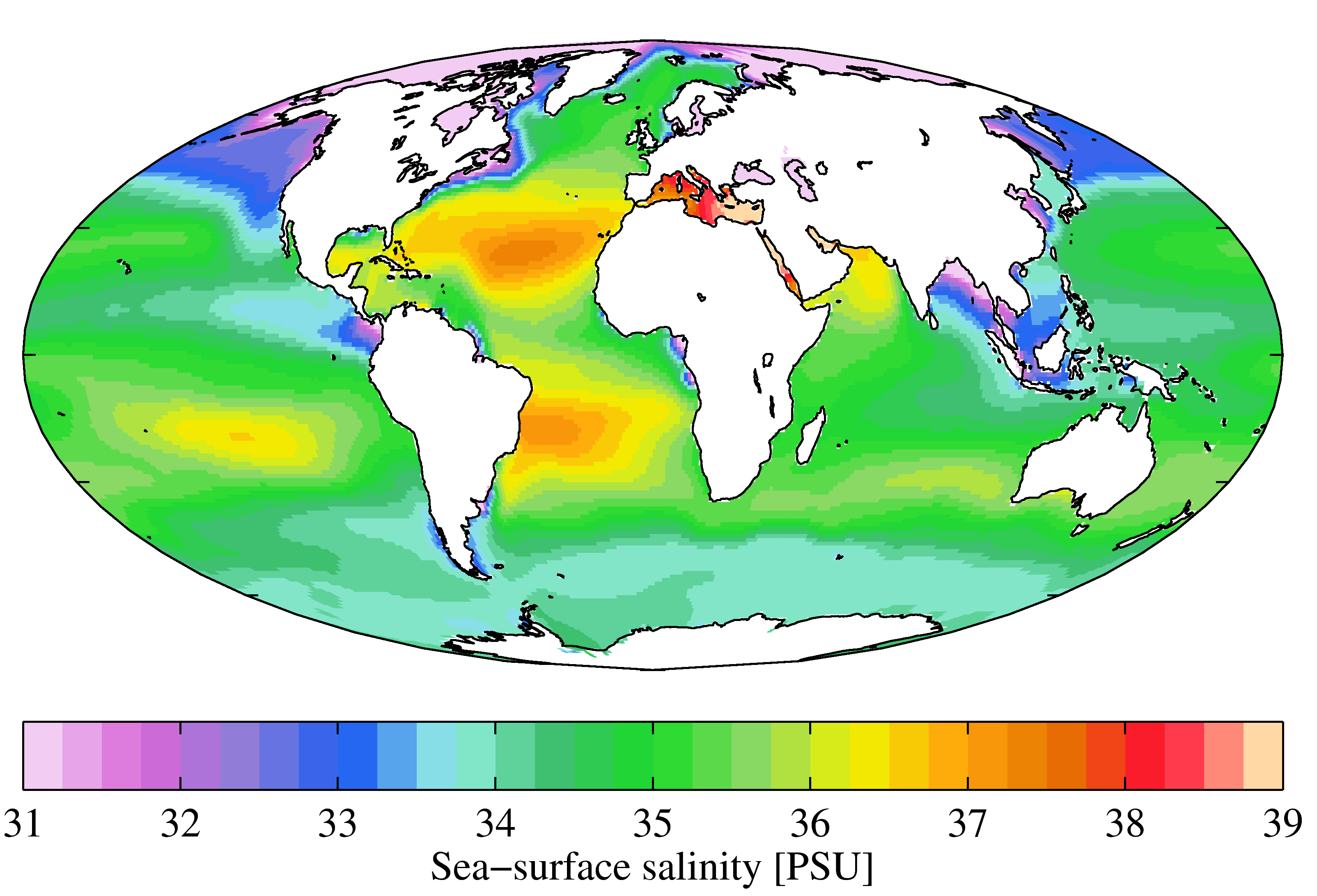
Annual mean sea surface salinity (WOA 2009)

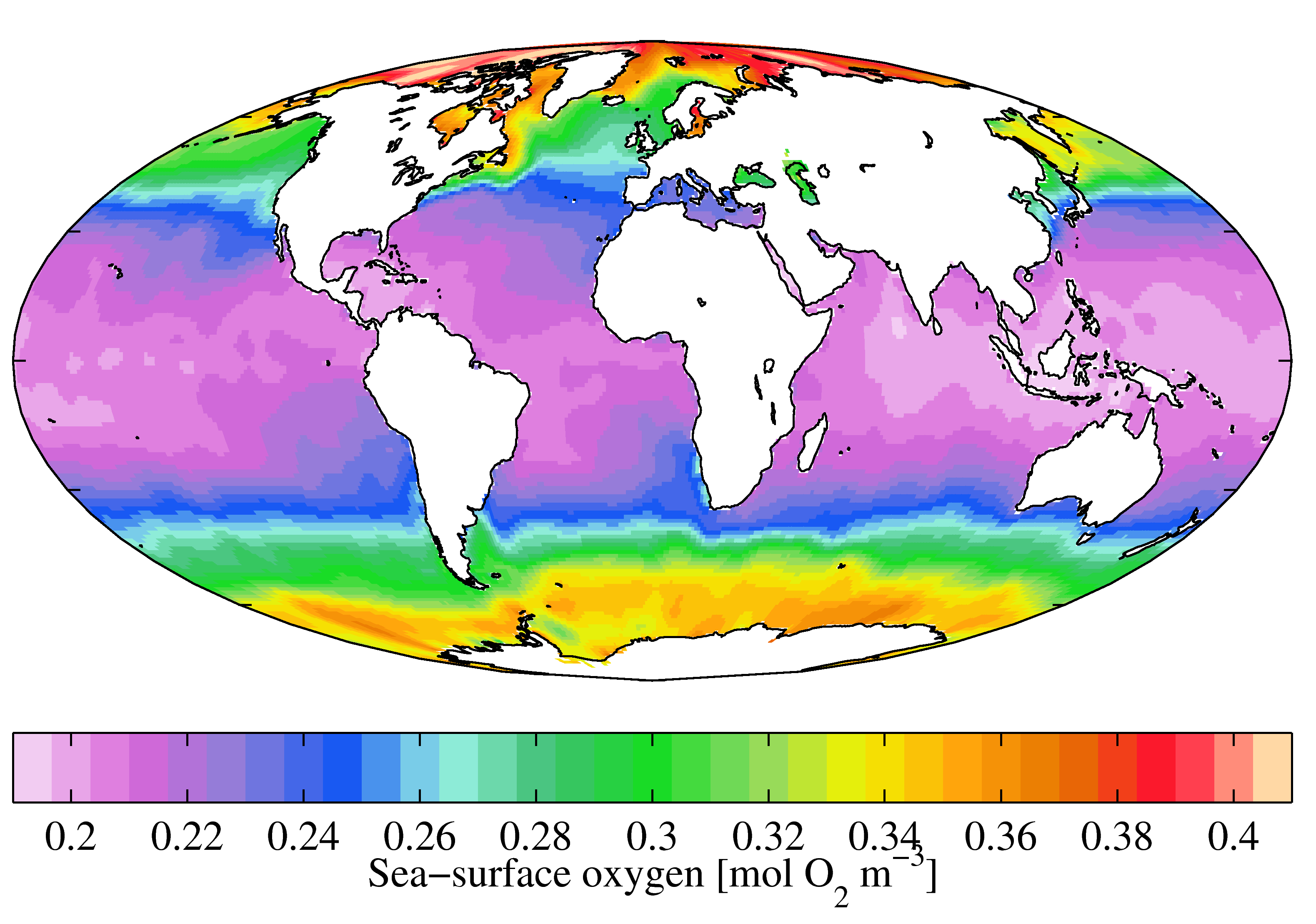
Annual mean sea surface dissolved oxygen (WOA 2009)

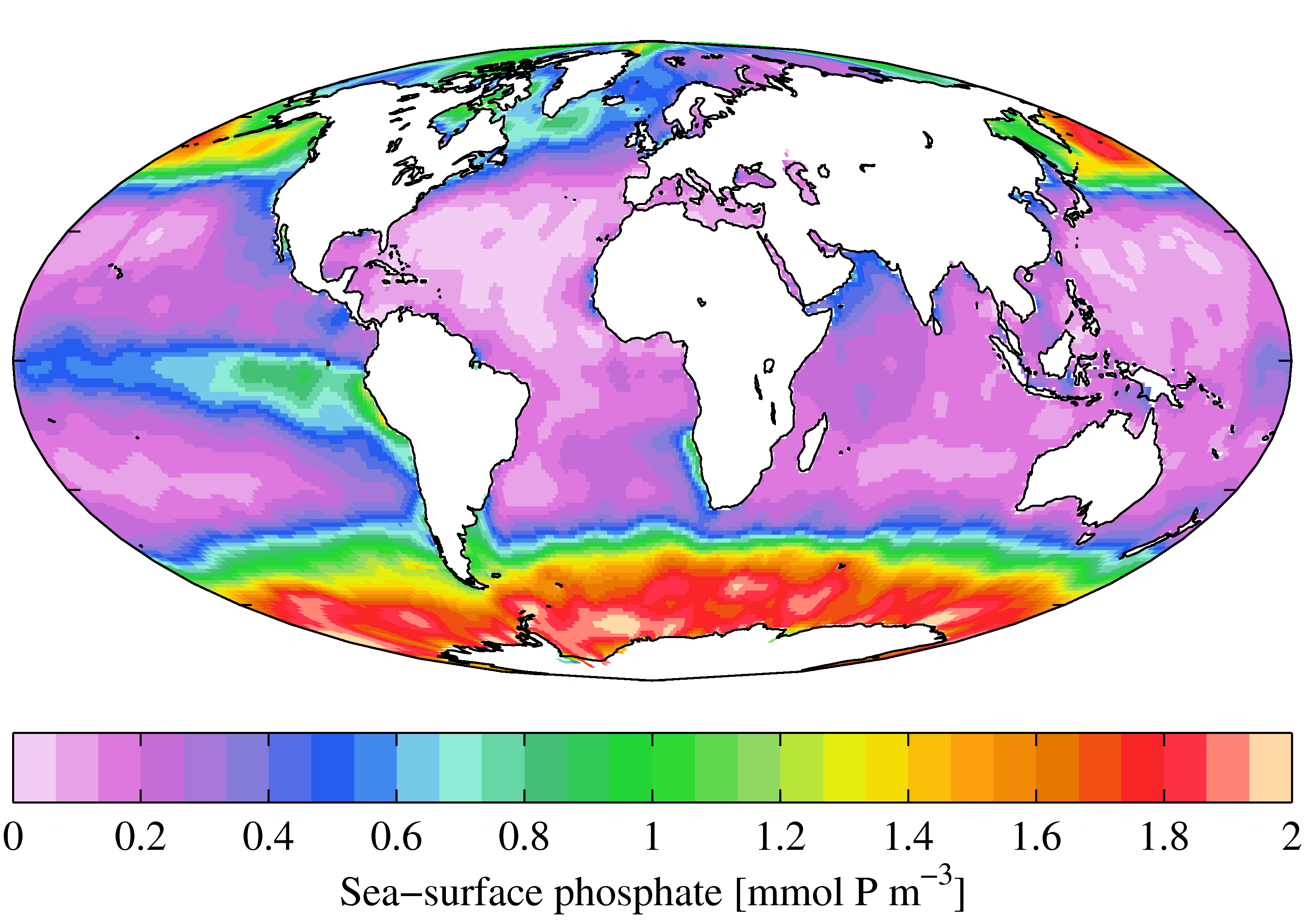
Annual mean sea surface phosphate (WOA 2009)

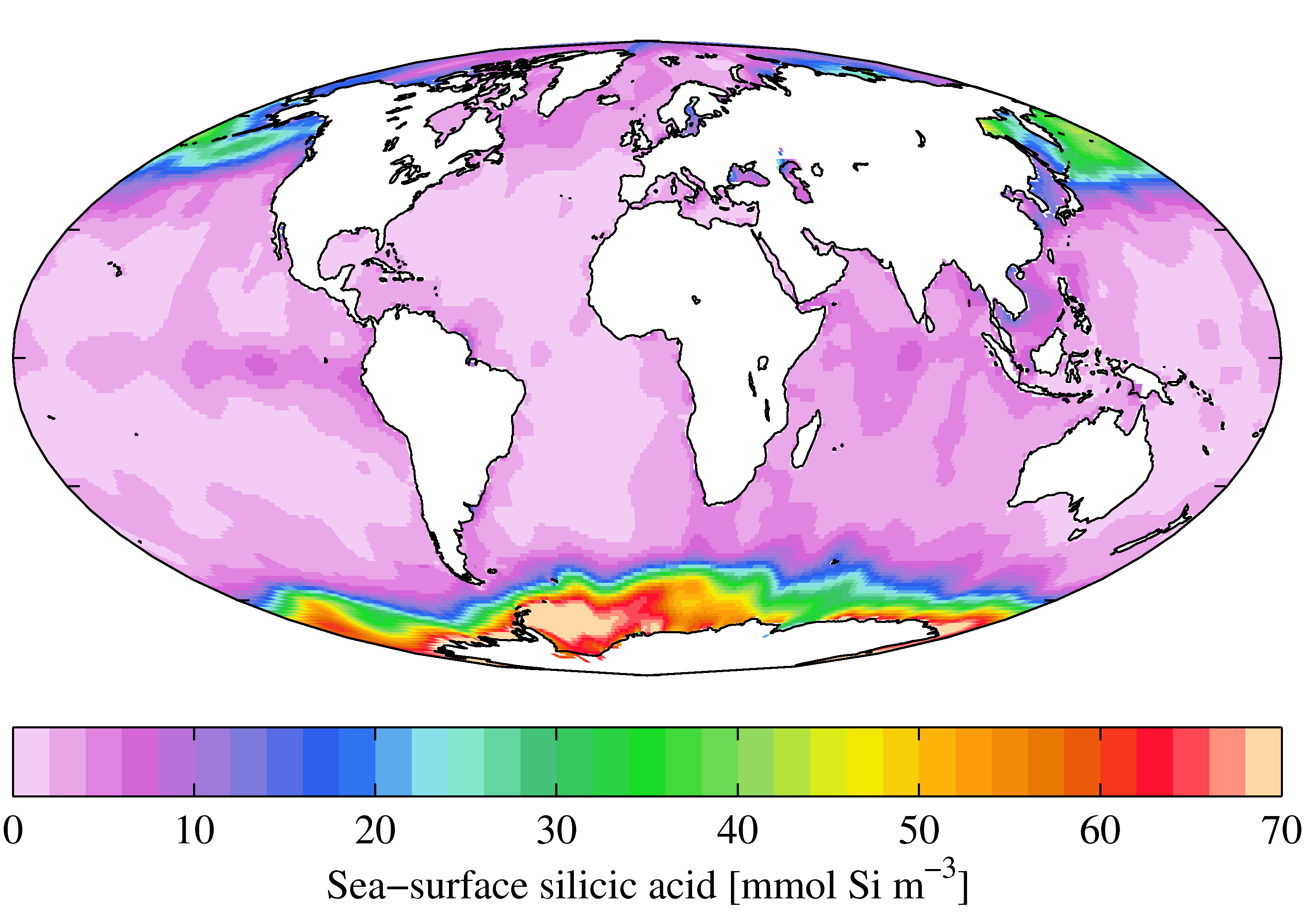
Annual mean sea surface silicic acid (WOA 2009)

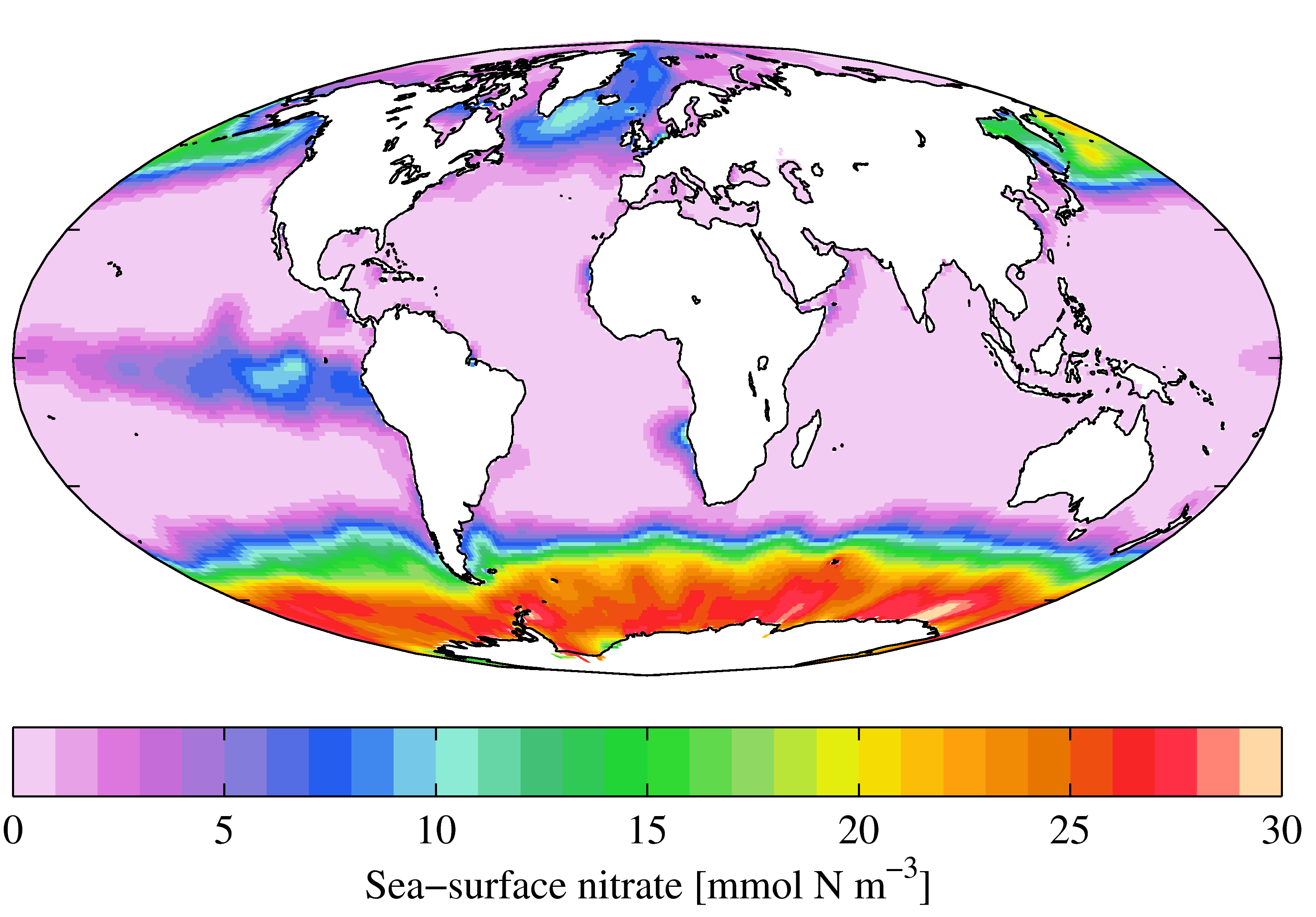
Annual mean sea surface nitrate (WOA 2009)

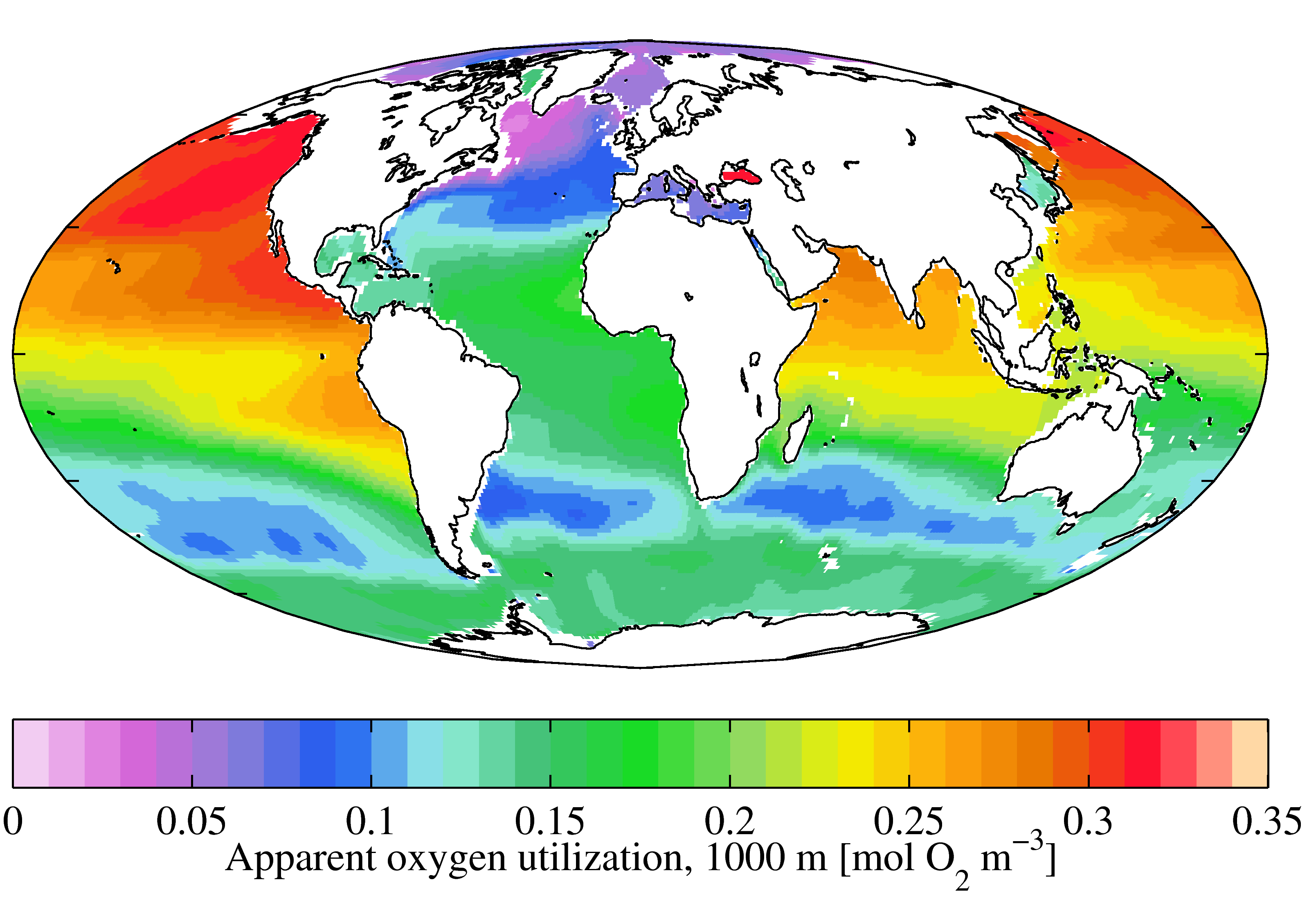
Annual mean apparent oxygen utilization at 1000 m depth (WOA 2009)

== See also ==
- CORA dataset
- European Atlas of the Seas
- Geochemical Ocean Sections Study (GEOSECS)
- Global Ocean Data Analysis Project (GLODAP)
- World Ocean Circulation Experiment (WOCE)
