= World Ocean Circulation Experiment =

Component of the international World Climate Research Program

The World Ocean Circulation Experiment (WOCE) was a component of the international World Climate Research Program, and aimed to establish the role of the World Ocean in the Earth's climate system. WOCE's field phase ran between 1990 and 1998, and was followed by an analysis and modeling phase that ran until 2002. When the WOCE was conceived, there were three main motivations for its creation. The first of these is the inadequate coverage of the World Ocean, specifically in the Southern Hemisphere. Data was also much more sparse during the winter months than the summer months, and there was—and still is to some extent—a critical need for data covering all seasons. Secondly, the data that did exist was not initially collected for studying ocean circulation and was not well suited for model comparison. Lastly, there were concerns involving the accuracy and reliability of some measurements. The WOCE was meant to address these problems by providing new data collected in ways designed to "meet the needs of global circulation models for climate prediction."

== Goals ==
Two major goals were set for the campaign.

1. Develop ocean models that can be used in climate models and collect the data necessary for testing them Specifically, understand:

- Large scale fluxes of heat and fresh water
- Dynamical balance of World Ocean circulation
- Components of ocean variability on months to years
- The rates and nature of formation, ventilation and circulation of water masses that influence the climate system on time scales from ten to one hundred years

In order to achieve Goal 1, the WCRP outlined and established Core Projects that would receive priority. The first of these was the "Global Description" project, which was meant to obtain data on the circulation of heat, fresh water and chemicals, as well as the statistics of eddies. The second project—"Southern Ocean"—placed particular emphasis on studying the Antarctic Circumpolar Current and the Southern Ocean’s interaction with the World Ocean. The third and final Core Project serving goal one was the "Gyre Dynamics Experiment." The second and third of these focuses are designed specifically to address the ocean’s role in decadal climate changes. Initial planning of the WOCE states that achievement of Goal 1 would involve "strong interaction between modeling and field activities," which are described further below.

2. Find the representativeness of the dataset for long-term behavior and find methods for determining long-term changes in ocean currents Specifically:

- Determine representative of specific WOCE data sets
- Identify those oceanographic parameters, indices and fields that are essential for continuing measurements in a climate observing system on decadal time scales
- Develop cost effective techniques suitable for deployment in an ongoing climate observing system

== Modeling ==
Models in WOCE were used for both experimental design and data analysis. Models with use of data can incorporate various properties, including thermal wind balance, maintenance of the barotropic vorticity budget, and conservation of heat, fresh water, or mass. Measurements useful for these parameters are heat, fresh water or tracer concentration; current, surface fluxes of heat and fresh water; sea surface elevation.

Both inverse modeling and data assimilation were employed during WOCE. Inverse modeling is the fitting of data using a numerical least squares or maximum likelihood fitting procedure. The data assimilation technique requires data to be compared with an initial integration of a model. The model is then progressed in time using new data and repeating the process.

The success of these methods requires sufficient data to fully constrain the model, hence the need for a comprehensive field program.

== Field Program ==
Goals for the WOCE Field Program were as follows.

- The experiment will be global in nature and the major observational components will be deployed in all oceans.
- The requirement of simultaneity of measurements will be imposed only where essential.
- The flexibility inherent in the existing arrangements for cooperative research in the worldwide oceanographic (and meteorological) community will be exploited as far as possible.

Major elements of the WOCE Field Program

Satellite Altimetry
plans built around the availability of ERS–1 and ERS–2 (European), TOPEX/POSEIDON (US/French) to study fields of surface forcing and oceanic surface topography
Hydrography
high quality conductivity-temperature-pressure profilers as well as free-fall instruments to provide a climatological temperature-salinity database
Geochemical Tracers
using chemical information (such as radioactive decay and atmospheric history) of passive compounds to study the formation rates and transport of water masses on climatological timescales
Ocean Surface Fluxes
using in-situ and satellite measurements to quantify fluxes of heat, water and momentum (necessary for modeling thermohaline and wind-driven circulation)
Satellite Winds
using surface buoys, Voluntary Observing Ships (VOS) and satellite microwave scatterometer systems to measure the surface wind field
Surface Meteorological Observations from VOS
improvement of sampling and accuracy in surface meteorological measurements, as well increasing area coverage
Upper Ocean Observations from Merchant Ships-of-Opportunity
expendable bathythermograph (XBT) sampling lines to study changes in heat content of the upper ocean
In-Situ Sea Level Measurements
upgrading and installing new sea-level gauges to calibrate altimetry measurements
Drifting Buoys and Floats
surface drifting buoys provide measurements such as sea level pressure, sea-surface temperature, humidity, precipitation, surface salinity, and near-surface and mid-depth currents
Moored instrumentation
provides detailed temporal information at a number of sites and depths

== Resulting Conclusions ==
This list, though not comprehensive, outlines a sampling of the most highly cited articles and books resulting from WOCE.

- Ganachaud, Alexandre; Wunsch, Carl (23 November 2000). "Improved estimates of global ocean circulation, heat transport and mixing from hydrographic data". Nature. 408 (6811): 453–457. Bibcode:2000Natur.408..453G. doi:10.1038/35044048. PMID 11100723. S2CID 4416105.
- Ocean Circulation and Climate, Observing and Modelling the Global Ocean, 1st Edition, Eds. Gerold Siedler, John Gould & John Church, Academic Press, 736pp. (International Geophysics Series 77) 2001
- Stammer, D. (2003). "Volume, heat, and freshwater transports of the global ocean circulation 1993–2000, estimated from a general circulation model constrained by World Ocean Circulation Experiment (WOCE) data" (PDF). Journal of Geophysical Research. 108 (C1): 3007. Bibcode:2003JGRC..108.3007S. doi:10.1029/2001JC001115. hdl:11858/00-001M-0000-0014-3AA4-A.
- Ganachaud, Alexandre (2003). "Large-scale mass transports, water mass formation, and diffusivities estimated from World Ocean Circulation Experiment (WOCE) hydrographic data". Journal of Geophysical Research: Oceans. 108 (C7): 3213. Bibcode:2003JGRC..108.3213G. doi:10.1029/2002JC001565.
- Ganachaud, Alexandre; Wunsch, Carl (December 2002). "Oceanic nutrient and oxygen transports and bounds on export production during the World Ocean Circulation Experiment: NUTRIENT AND OXYGEN TRANSPORTS FROM WOCE". Global Biogeochemical Cycles. 16 (4): 5–1–5–14. doi:10.1029/2000GB001333. S2CID 15462518.
- Revisiting the South Pacific subtropical circulation: A synthesis of World Ocean Circulation Experiment observations along 32°S, S. E. Wijffels, J. M. Toole, R. Davis, Journal of Geophysical Research, September 2012

== See also ==
- Geochemical Ocean Sections Study (GEOSECS)
- Global Ocean Data Analysis Project (GLODAP)
- World Ocean Atlas (WOA)
