= Axial Seamount =

Submarine volcano in the Pacific Ocean

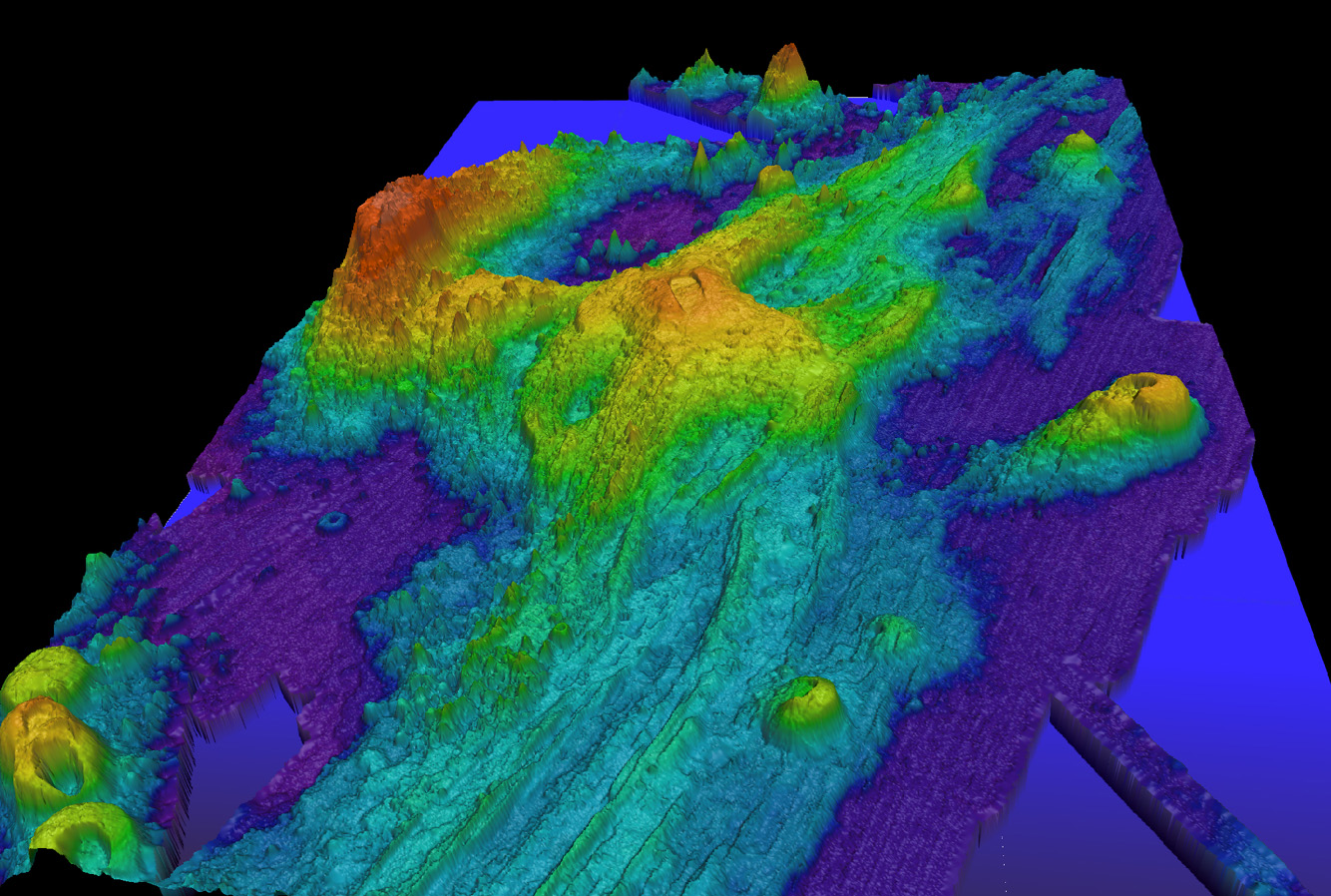
- Exaggerated swath bathymetry of Axial Seamount and the surrounding area. (Note: The height of extraneous features, especially Brown Bear Seamount to the left, is greatly exaggerated.)
- Summit depth: 1,410 m (4,626 ft)
- Height: 1,100 m (3,609 ft)

Location
- Location: Juan de Fuca Ridge
- Coordinates: 46°N 130°W

Geology
- Type: Seamount (Submarine volcano), Hotspot volcano, Shield volcano
- Volcanic arc/chain: Cobb–Eickelberg Seamount chain
- Last activity: April 2015
- Last eruption: April 2015

History
- Discovery date: 1981
- Discovered by: NOAAS Surveyor

Axial Seamount (also Coaxial Seamount or Axial Volcano) is a seamount, submarine volcano, and underwater shield volcano in the Pacific Ocean, located on the Juan de Fuca Ridge, approximately 480 km (298 mi) west of Cannon Beach, Oregon. Standing 1,100 m (3,609 ft) high, Axial Seamount is the youngest volcano and current eruptive center of the Cobb–Eickelberg Seamount chain. Located at the center of both a geological hotspot and a mid-ocean ridge, the seamount is geologically complex, and its origins are still poorly understood. Axial Seamount is set on a long, low-lying plateau, with two large rift zones trending 50 km (31 mi) to the northeast and southwest of its center. The volcano features an unusual rectangular caldera, and its flanks are pockmarked by fissures, vents, sheet flows, and pit craters up to 100 m (328 ft) deep; its geology is further complicated by its intersection with several smaller seamounts surrounding it.

Axial Seamount was first detected in the 1970s by satellite altimetry, and mapped and explored by Pisces IV, DSV Alvin, and others through the 1980s. A large package of sensors was dropped on the seamount through 1992, and the New Millennium Observatory was established on its flanks in 1996. Axial Seamount received significant scientific attention following the seismic detection of a submarine eruption at the volcano in January 1998, the first time a submarine eruption had been detected and followed in situ. Subsequent cruises and analysis showed that the volcano had generated lava flows up to 13 m (43 ft) thick, and the total eruptive volume was found to be 0.018–0.076 km^{3} (0.0043–0.0182 mi^{3}). Axial Seamount erupted again in April 2011, producing a 1.6 km (1 mi) wide lava flow. There was another eruption in 2015 and another is expected in 2026.

== Geology ==
=== Tectonic setting ===
Position of Axial Seamount relative to the Juan de Fuca Ridge.

Axial Seamount is the youngest volcano and current eruptive center of the Cobb–Eickelberg Seamount chain, a chain of seamounts that terminates south of Alaska. Axial lies where the chain intersects with the Juan de Fuca Ridge, approximately 480 km (298 mi) west of Oregon. It is a product of the Cobb hotspot, but now sits on an ocean spreading center between the Juan de Fuca plate and the Pacific Plate, offset by the Blanco fracture zone to the south and a ridge-built triple junction to the north.

This position is not yet entirely understood. It is believed that the chain, formed over millions of years by the now-inactive Cobb hotspot, is older than the mid-ocean ridge it bisects. Between 200,000 and 700,000 years ago, the hotspot was encroached by the tectonic spreading center, displacing it by as much as 20 km (12 mi) and building up the 500 km (311 mi) long Juan de Fuca Ridge. At least 7 spreading centers have been recognized, and plate measurements near Axial show that the ridge is separating at a rate of 6 cm (2 in) per year, (Note: In south to north order, they are the Cleft, Vance, Coaxial, Cobb, Endeavor, and West Valley segments.) producing a complex system of oceanic basins and ridges. However some scientists have questioned this theory, pointing out that the high density of the chain's overlapping seamounts is incompatible with such an origin, as a hotspot would form a well organized, widely spaced chain. Although the exact nature of Axial Seamount remains unknown, its complex origins makes it one of the most geologically interesting features in the North Pacific.

=== Structure ===
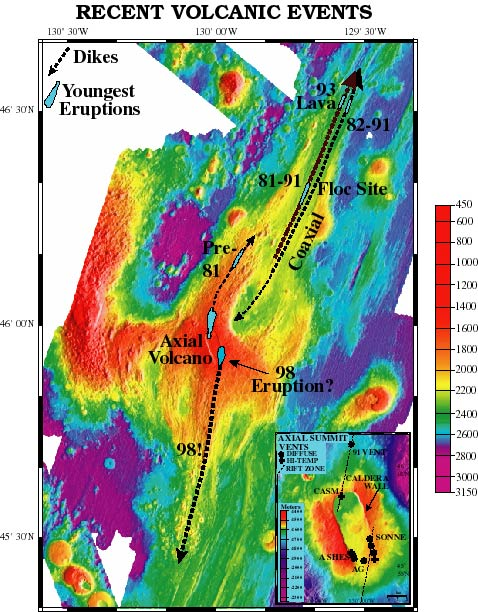
Full bathymetry of Axial Seamount, with a close-up of its unusual caldera. Part of Brown Bear Seamount can be seen on the left.

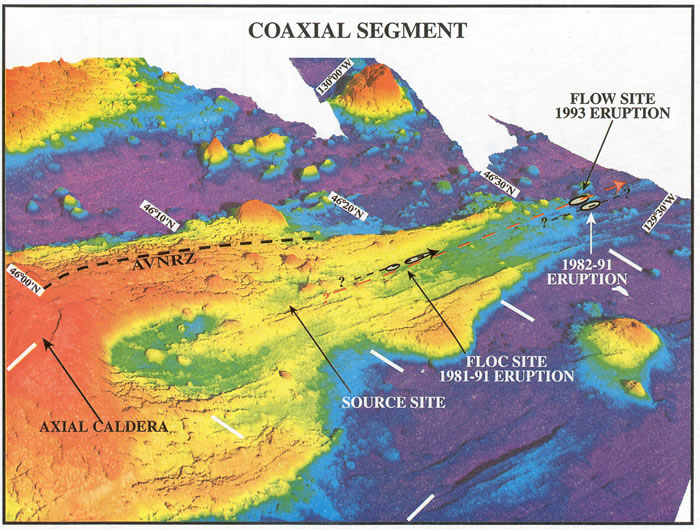
Close up of the northern rift zone.

Axial Seamount is the most active volcanic site in the North Pacific. Study of magnetic delineations along the seamount have modeled the ridge's history up to 30 million years ago, and shown that growth has progressed mostly in the north, with some southward progression dating back 3.5 million years. The base of Axial Seamount is a long, low-lying plateau, and the eastern part of the seamount is defined by a series of linear scarps. Axial Seamount has two major volcanic rifts extending approximately 50 km (31 mi) north and south of its main summit, as well as several much smaller, ill-defined ones aligned in a roughly similar pattern. Basins around the volcano increase its irregularity, making it unusually complex (most seamounts of roughly the same size are circular or flattened in shape.)

Axial Seamount's summit is marked by an unusual rectangular caldera, 3 km × 8 km (2 mi × 5 mi) in area, ~3° in slope, and breached on the southeast side. The area is offset by the two rift zones and defined on three sides by boundary faults up to 150 m (492 ft) deep. The caldera is roughly 50 m (164 ft) deeper at the north side than it is in the south. Flows within the caldera consist mostly of sheet flows pocketed by lava ponds and pit craters. Less common are pillow lavas; their arrangement along the caldera walls suggests that they were an important component in the volcano's early growth. There are several dome-like structures within the caldera with heights of 100–300 m (328–984 ft). There are several small craters within the region, the largest of which, nicknamed the D.D. Cone, is 2 km (1 mi) in diameter and 100 m (328 ft) in relief. However, most of the features do not range over 30 to 40 m (98 to 131 ft) deep and 1 km (1 mi) across.

The northern rift zone of Axial Seamount is a 5 km (3 mi) long ridge running 10 to 20 degrees northeast of the main caldera. The rift is pocketed by multiple fissures, 100–200 m (328–656 ft) in length, as far as 7 km (4 mi) from Axial Volcano's center, and reaching up to 400 m (1,312 ft) long and 20 m (66 ft) deep. The area contains high amounts of volcanic glass; a major eruption is still visible in the form of an elongated glassy lava flow extending off the caldera wall, east of the main rift line. Dives in 1983 found extensive low-temperature venting at the northern half of the fissure. The shorter, newer southern rift zone consists of a topographically plunging rift, surrounding by subtle, discontinuous faults. Camera tows along the southern flank reveal that the area is built of delineated sheet flows, small lava ponds, and lava channels.

The youngest of the flows on Axial Seamount are aligned along the two rift zones, followed by flows inside the summit caldera; the oldest appear to originate from directly around the caldera, where most of the basalt is completely covered in accumulated sediment. This suggests a bilateral growth pattern, a trend also found in Hawaiʻian volcanics and other well-known seamounts, for instance Jasper Seamount.

Axial Seamount's growth has intersected the growth of many of the smaller seamounts around it. The largest of these is Brown Bear Seamount, to which it is connected by a narrow ridge running roughly perpendicular to its western caldera wall. However, little evidence of interactions between the two seamounts has been found. On the other hand, Axial Seamount's southern rift zone bisects Vance Seamount by as much as 30 km (19 mi), creating a zone of intense fissuring at the northern edge of the smaller volcano. (Note: The Vance Seamounts is a group of individually nameless volcanoes, so its northernmost member is sometimes called Vance Seamount for convenience.) Interactions with Cobb Seamount to the north are more complex, forming an unusual "bent spreading center". In addition there are four smaller structures directly east, north, and south of Axial.

=== 2025 events ===
In May 2025, it was reported that the Axial Seamount is monitored closely by the Ocean Observatories Initiative's Regional Cabled Array. The volcano has shown increased seismic activity, including over 1,000 small earthquakes daily, and significant uplift of its caldera floor, indicating magma accumulation beneath the surface. Despite these developments, experts are confident that in case of an eruption, there is minimal risk to human populations, as the volcano is far out in the ocean and at a depth of about 1.4 kilometers beneath surface. Historically, eruptions at Axial Seamount have been non-explosive, with lava flows reshaping the seafloor without generating tsunamis or significant seismic events. Moreover, such eruptions can rejuvenate hydrothermal vent ecosystems, supporting diverse marine life adapted to these extreme environments.

== History ==
=== Early history ===
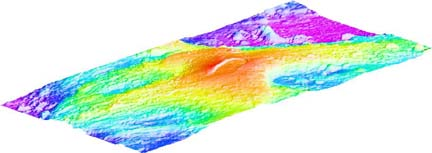
Early surface bathymetry of Axial Seamount

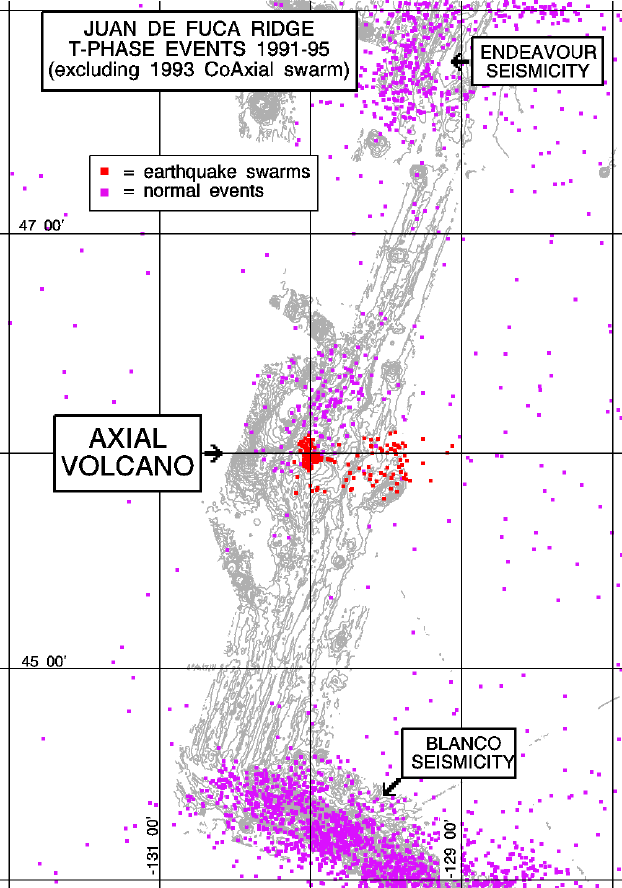
Distribution of earthquake activity in the years prior to the 1998 eruption. Red dots represent earthquake swarms.

The first volcanoes along the Juan de Fuca ridge, including Axial Seamount, were detected in the 1970s by satellite altimetry. Axial Seamount's proximity to the western coast and shallow depth make it one of the most easily accessible seamounts in the world, and its unique geological setting and active state also makes it one of the most interesting, rivaling Davidson Seamount to the south in scientific interest.

The first bathymetry of the seamount was compiled by the NOAAS Surveyor in 1981, as part of SeaBeam trials in the North Pacific. The survey was specifically meant to find and link seafloor hydrothermal activity to geomorphic features. Four areas of increased temperature concentration, indicative of hydrothermal activity were found, and the then-unnamed Axial Seamount was among them. Submersible dives with Pisces IV and DSV Alvin in 1983 and 1984 discovered the first active black smoker vents in the north Pacific. Soon after Axial Seamount was named for its central position on the intersection of the Cobb–Eickelberg Seamount chain and Juan de Fuca Ridge. That same year, the National Oceanic and Atmospheric Administration (NOAA) founded its VENTS program, providing impetus for studying the volcano more closely.

Between 1987 and 1992, a variety of pressure sensors, tilt sensors, temperature probes, and seismometers were dropped on the volcano in what came to be known as the Volcanic Systems Moninters (VSN). Further bathymetries by the NOAAS Discoverer in 1991 and RV Sonne in 1996 detailed the seamount further, making it one of the best known features in the North Pacific. Also in 1996, the New Millennium Observatory (NeMO) was established on Axial Seamount, to study volcanic perturbations and the effect they have on hydrothermal communities.

=== 1998 eruption ===
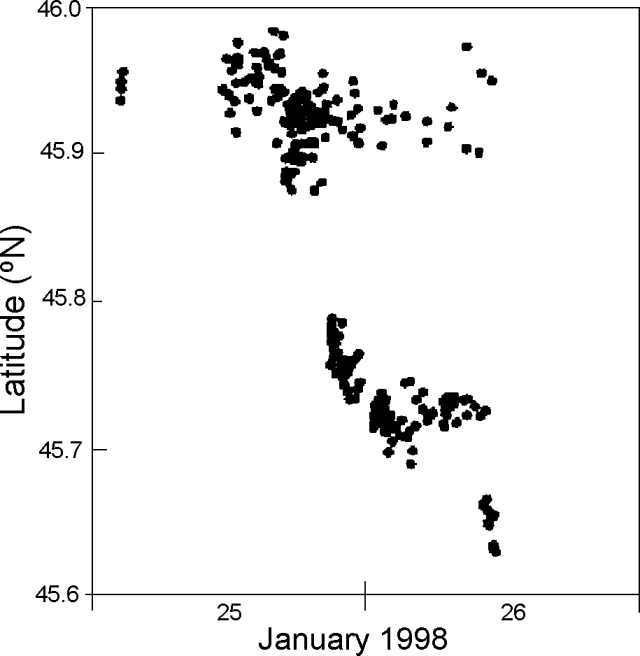
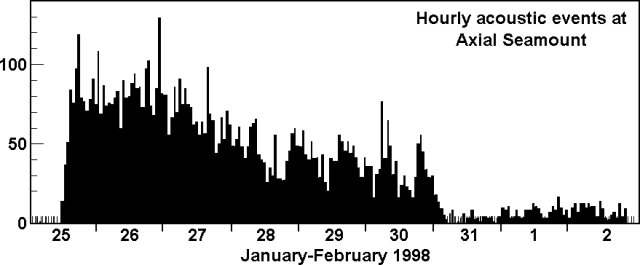
Distribution of earthquakes (Note: For the time interval between 25 January and 28 January.) and number of hourly events (Note: On January 31, the nearest SOSUS station failed, causing a loss on the data on the days following.) detected by SOSUS during the 1998 eruption.

The 1998 eruption of Axial Seamount was preceded by several large earthquake swarms, common indicators of volcanic activity. The swarms correlated to magma movements in the volcano; bottom pressure recorders deployed on the volcano between 1987 and 1992 recorded five instances of deflation in the summit surface (caused by lava movement), ranging from 3 to 10 cm (1 to 4 in). In 1991, the National Oceanic and Atmospheric Administration (NOAA) was granted access to the United States Navy's SOSUS system, a chain of submerged hydrophones in the North Pacific originally used by the Navy to detect Russian submarines during the Cold War. Since 1993, the NOAA has maintained a real-time monitoring system that alerts the organization whenever an event occurs. The hydrophones are able to detect even very small earthquakes (~ magnitude 1.8) by listening for the acoustic waves (called tertiary waves or T-waves) carried through the SOFAR channel layer in the ocean over large distances with minimal loss in power, making them an ideal way to record otherwise unnoticeable submarine earthquakes. Over the course of the eruption, only 3 earthquakes were strong enough to register on land-based systems. However, they cannot interpret earthquake depth or what caused them.

Between 1991 and 1996 Axial Seamount experienced a single earthquake swarm of over 50 events. Between May and November 1997 this activity increased markedly, with SOSUS recording 5 such swarms, culminating with a massive 11-day, 8247-quake event around the time of the eruption, in January 1998. The seismicity began at the summit, but within 6 hours had begun to migrate south as well; by 29 November 1997 the swarm had moved south by 50 km (31 mi). This coincided with lava release along the summit and southern flank. The seamount remained absolutely quiet thereafter, suggesting the completion of an eruptive cycle at the volcano. In all, 9055 earthquakes were detected, and 1669 were strong enough to be located. Earthquake activity was concentrated around the summit and southern rift zones, with the majority of events centered inside the summit caldera; temperature probes and pressure recorders in the caldera recorded an average 0.6 °C (1.08 °F) increase and 3.3 m (11 ft) height deflation, respectively, during the event. This close monitoring gives the 1998 eruption the distinction of being the only submarine eruption ever observed in situ.

The first post-eruption expedition was organized and conducted by RV Wecoma on 12 February 1998, which conducted conductivity, temperature, depth, and optical casts to unusual results. In May, a dedicated bathymetric survey of the seamount showed topographical changes along the volcano's southern flank, which estimated the thickest flows to 13 m (43 ft). In July DSV Alvin made several dives on the seamount's summit caldera, followed in August through September by an extensive observation and collection program using ROV ROPOS, confirming the bathymetric estimates. A sheet flow more than 3 km (2 mi) long and 500 to 800 m (1,640 to 2,625 ft) wide was produced from Axial Seamount's upper southern flank, on the site of what was formerly an active geothermal field. The southern flows were in an area marked by a difference between older sediments and newer, glassier rock, and the maximum ridge generated by the eruption, at the crest of the southern flow, was 13 m (40 ft) high. The total eruptive volume was roughly 0.018–0.076 km^{3} (0.004–0.018 mi^{3}).

The development, eruption, and close monitoring of Axial Seamount provided a fertile model on submarine volcanic eruptions to scientists; several scientific papers on the topic were published soon after.

=== 2011 eruption ===
Seismic activity at Axial Seamount virtually disappeared after the 1998 eruption, and monitoring of the volcano was done principally with bottom pressure recorders deployed on the volcano's flanks, supplemented since 2000 by annual measurements using pressure sensors mounted on Remotely operated underwater vehicles (ROVs) and applied to local benchmarks. The sensors have shown that Axial Seamount is slowly reflating; just after the eruption the seamount was swelling at 20 cm (8 in) per month, a number that decreased to 15 cm (6 in) by 2006. In eight years Axial Seamount recovered approximately 50% of its 3.2 m (10.5 ft) of pre-eruption swelling, and in 2006, William Chadwick of the Oregon State University and his associates calculated that the next eruption would occur in approximately 2014:

Axial Seamount behaves in a more predictable way than many other volcanoes; likely due to its robust magma supply coupled with its thin crust, and its location on a mid-ocean ridge spreading center. It is now the only volcano on the seafloor whose surface deformation has been continuously monitored throughout an entire eruption cycle.

— Scott L. Nooner, Columbia University

In July 2011, a dive using ROV Jason discovered new lava flows on the volcanoes that had not been present a year before. The expeditionary crew recovered two bottom-pressure recorders and two hydrophones (a third was found buried in lava) off the volcano, which together showed that the eruption had occurred during April, starting on 6 April 2011. Although the instruments recorded hundreds of seismic events, only a handful had been noticed by SOSUS and land-based seismometers, as many components of the system had been offline at the time. The volcano subsided by more than 2 m (7 ft) and produced a 2 km (1 mi) wide lava flow during the event, which was as much as three times larger than the 1998 eruption.

== Ecology ==
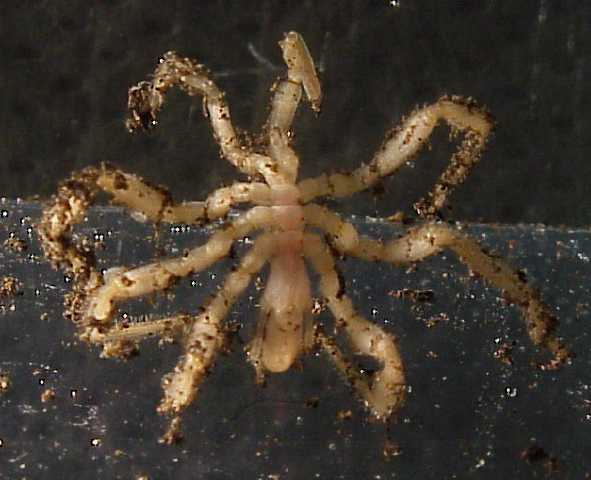
Sericosura verenae, a vent sea spider commonly found on Axial Seamount.

Sample collection of flocculent materials after an eruption for microbiological characterization.

In 1983, a Canadian–American collaborative expedition, named the Canadian American Seamount (CASM) expedition, visited the northwestern edge of Axial Seamount's summit caldera to investigate a persistent temperature anomaly in the region. In a series of eight dives conducted by Pisces IV, the scientists discovered a vibrant hydrothermal vent community on the leading edge of a 300 m (984 ft) fissure within the caldera. Vent temperatures were measured around 35 °C (95 °F), approximately 30 °C (54 °F) hotter than the surrounding environment. Camera tows and submersible dives through the 1980s and 1990s revealed Axial Seamount's active state, including the only known black smoker in the northwest Pacific. Three venting centers have been recognized: the original site, named CHASM; a southwestern caldera field discovered in the late 1980s, named ASHES; and a site located on its southeastern rift zone, named CASTLE. All primarily emit sulfur and sulfides.

The temperature and composition of Axial Seamount's hydrothermal vents changes over time, but always maintains a roughly common identity, as do the vents' individual microbial communities. Vents generally have a lower pH than the surrounding fluid, and are acidic and alkaline respectively. The temperature of the magma feeding the system is uncertain, and may vary between 300 and 550 °C (572 and 1,022 °F). Curiously, vent fluid are heavily enriched in helium, containing five times more than the amount of the element in similar vents in the Galápagos, and 580 times that of regular seawater.

Tube worms of the Pogonophora family thicket the largest vents on Axial Seamounts, forming colonies up to 6 m^{2} (65 ft^{2}) thick in places; smaller, less nutritious vents feed bacterial mats, smaller tube worms, and limpets. The three most common microbial groups are bacterial Campylobacterota, Methanococcaceae, and Euryarchaeota family. The most common fauna at Axial Seamount's hydrothermal vents is the worm Ridgeia piscesae, which is found at hydrothermal sites of all descriptions on the Juan de Fuca ridge, and is the base of Axial Seamount's hydrothermal ecosystem. (Note: The morphology of the worm changes with local morphology, so much so that it was originally considered two distinct species.) Other species on the seamount include the tube worm P. palmiformis, the sea snail Lepetodrilus fucensis, the bristle worm Amphisamytha galapagensis, and the sea spider Sericosura verenae.

== See also ==
- Davidson Seamount
- Geology of the Pacific Northwest
