= Cobb–Eickelberg Seamount chain =

Undersea mountains in the Pacific Ocean

The Cobb-Eickelberg seamount chain is a range of undersea mountains formed by volcanic activity of the Cobb hotspot located in the Pacific Ocean. The seamount chain extends to the southeast on the Pacific Plate, beginning at the Aleutian Trench and terminating at Axial Seamount, located on the Juan de Fuca Ridge. The seamount chain is spread over a vast length of approximately 1,800 km. The location of the Cobb hotspot that gives rise to these seamounts is 46° N—130° W. The Pacific plate is moving to the northwest over the hotspot, causing the seamounts in the chain to decrease in age to the southeast. Axial is the youngest seamount and is located approximately 480 km west of Cannon Beach, Oregon. The most studied seamounts that make up this chain are Axial, Brown Bear, Cobb, and Patton seamounts. There are many other seamounts in this chain which have not been explored.

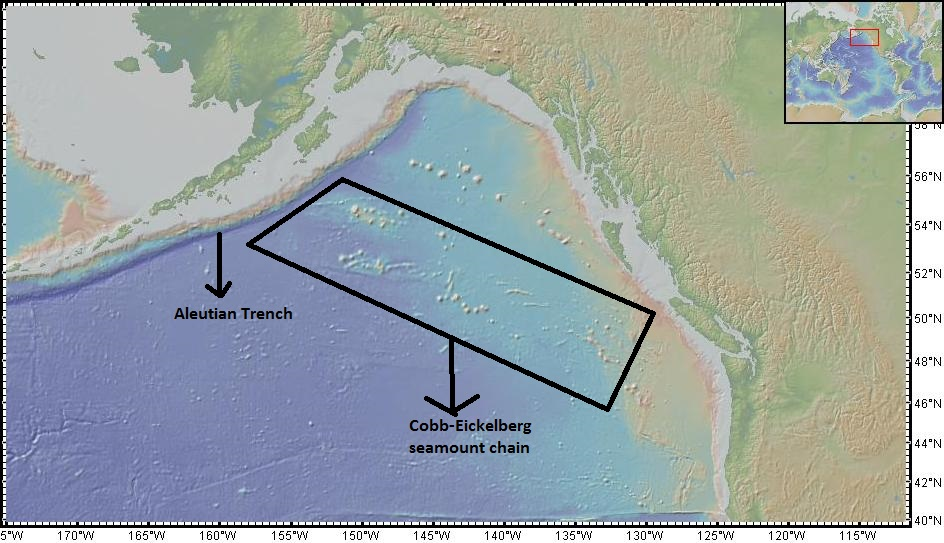
Cobb-Eickelberg seamount chain extending all the way to Aleutian Trench

== Formation ==
Seamounts are created at hotspots. These are isolated areas within tectonic plates where plumes of magma rise through the crust and erupt at the surface. This creates a chain of submarine volcanoes and seamounts.

The Cobb hotspot is located at the Juan de Fuca Ridge in the Pacific Ocean. The Pacific Plate is moving north-westward direction at a speed of ~5.5 cm per year. Periodic volcanic events have led to magma eruption onto the seafloor, forming seamounts. Given the length of the chain this hotspot must have been active over a period of at least 30 million years (probably longer since older seamounts would have been subsided). The last known volcanic activity was at Axial Seamount, which is currently directly overlying the hotspot. The total magmatic flux from the Cobb Hotspot is about 0.3 cubic m/yr.

Although the Cobb hotspot is currently located beneath the Juan de Fuca ridge, this has not always been the case. It went under the Juan de Fuca Ridge when the Pacific plate started moving northwest and eventually the boundary came right on top of the hotspot.

Currently the Axial seamount is the only active seamount. The most recent eruption took place in April–May 2015.

== Seamounts ==
=== 1. Axial Seamount ===
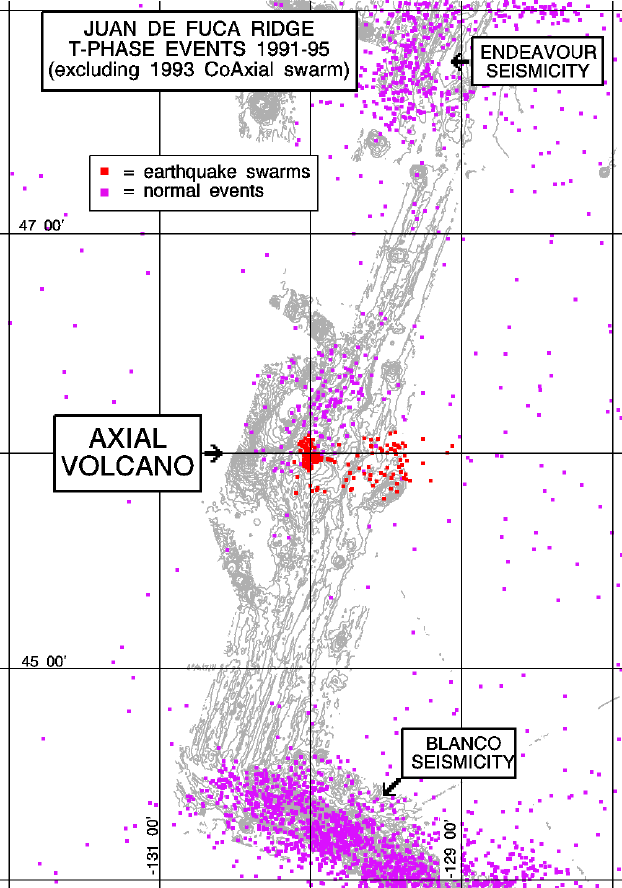
The most recent seamount

Axial Seamount is the youngest seamount in the Cobb Eickelberg Seamount chain. Since this is the most active of all the Cobb-Eickelberg Seamounts, it is studied the most: to help understand the dynamics of seamounts, volcanic activity, earthquakes, biodiversity, geology and chemistry. The Axial Volcano is about 700 meters higher than the Juan de Fuca Ridge and about 1,000 meters higher than the front of the flanking basins on either side. The Axial Volcano plateaus on top, and has a relatively smooth relief, with a rectangular shape of size 3 km x 8 km. 42% of the lava surrounding the volcano ranges from ropy, whorly, or lineated pāhoehoe to jumbled chaotic form. The remaining area is mostly pillow basalt. Colonial protozoans, bacterial mats, pogonophorans, metazoans, polychaetes, bivalves, tubeworms, copepods and many other organisms are found in the region where there are hydrothermal vents present in the caldera. This helps with the study of varying biodiversity at great depths.

Axial seamount is the only active seamount in the chain, because it is on top of the Cobb hotspot. All the other seamounts in this chain are inactive because their source of magma, the Cobb hotspot, has moved out from underneath them.

=== 2. Brown Bear Volcano ===
With an age of 0.5–1.5 million years, Brown Bear Seamount is the second youngest seamount in the Cobb-Eickelberg chain. It is northwest of Axial Seamount and connected by a small ridge. Due to its separation from the Juan de Fuca ridge, spreading has very little effect on Brown Bear, so it is not as geologically complex and is not studied in detail. It has a volcanic cone of width 5 km and rises approximately 1,000 meters from the ocean floor. The Brown Bear Seamount summit is at a depth of 1,400 meters. Geographically, the Brown Bear Seamount is separated into two areas, Northwestern and Southeastern, with distinct morphological features. This is thought to be caused by the influence of the mid ocean ridge extensional stress regime. The morphology of the western portion also suggests that it was formed before the hotspot interacted with the Juan de Fuca ridge. The northwestern section of Brown Bear is dominated by a large (5 km diameter) rounded volcanic cone structure. The southern portion extends south of 46.1 degrees North Latitude, and consists of relatively small (1–2 km diameter) volcanic cones.

=== 3. Cobb Seamount ===
The Cobb Seamount rises from a 2,750 m basin to within 37 meters of the ocean surface. It is located just 100 km to the northwest of the hotspot. This seamount is at least 3.3 million years old. The Cobb seamount has been extensively studied for its geological features. Cobb seamount was once an island that was 914 meters above sea level which due to erosion became a seamount. Samples collected from this location were used in studies that determined the age and geological composition of the rocks. The Cobb Seamount is all basalt and contains phenocrysts of plagioclase and clinopyroxene; the intergranular/interstitial matrix was found to have iron and titanium oxides. Video and photographs collected in 2012 from Cobb Seamount have shown a wide variety of biodiversity at the location. 17 benthic taxa were observed through pictures collected from the ROV dives. Most common species included sea cucumbers, squat lobsters, thornyheads, and corals.

=== 4. Patton Seamount ===
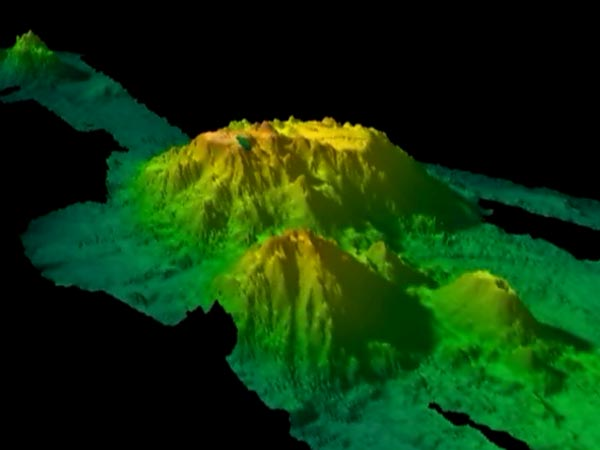
3-D bathymetric map of Patton Seamount, a Gulf of Alaska seamount, with two smaller seamounts in the foreground. Deep areas are blue, and shallow areas are red.

Patton Seamount is about 33 million years old. Although there is not much information about its geology, the biology at the Patton Seamount is very well studied. The seamount's summit is 183 meters below the ocean surface, and its height from the seafloor is 3,048 meters.

In July 1999, DSV Alvin was used to explore the biodiversity at the Patton Seamount. The shallow water community mostly consisted of rockfish, flatfish, sea stars and attached suspension feeders. The community at mid-depths consisted of attached suspension feeding organisms like corals, sponges, crinoids, sea anemones and sea cucumbers. The common fish species were the sablefish and the giant grenadier. The deep water community consisted of fewer attached suspension feeders and more highly mobile species like Pacific grenadier, popeye grenadier, Pacific flatnose and large mobile crabs.

== Volcanic activity in the past and eruptions ==
Currently, the only active seamount is Axial Seamount, located directly overtop the hotspot at Juan de Fuca Ridge. The most recent eruption was in April–May 2015, with a prior eruption in 2011. Another eruption was detected seismically in January 1998. Lava erupted from a 9 km long fissure, and the caldera subsided by 3 meters during the eruption. In 1983, hydrothermal venting was discovered.

Foraminiferan fossil studies have suggested that Cobb Seamount was a pre-late Eocene volcano. Thus, it was likely volcanically active approximately 40 million years ago, and remained volcanically active until about 3.3 million years ago when the Cobb seamount was formed.

Ar40-Ar39 dating of deep basalt from the Patton seamount shows it to be 33 million years old, which coincides with the time when the seamount was above the Cobb hotspot. However, there are samples collected from shallower depths of basalt which are younger, suggesting that even after the hotspot volcanism ceases, non-hotspot volcanism can sometimes take place.

== Other seamounts of the Cobb Eickelberg seamount chain ==
The following list is according to Desonie et al. 1990.

- Thompson
- Son of Brown Bear
- Corn
- Pipe
- Warwick
- Eickelberg
- Forster
- Miller
- Murray
