= Patton Seamount =

Underwater volcano in the Gulf of Alaska

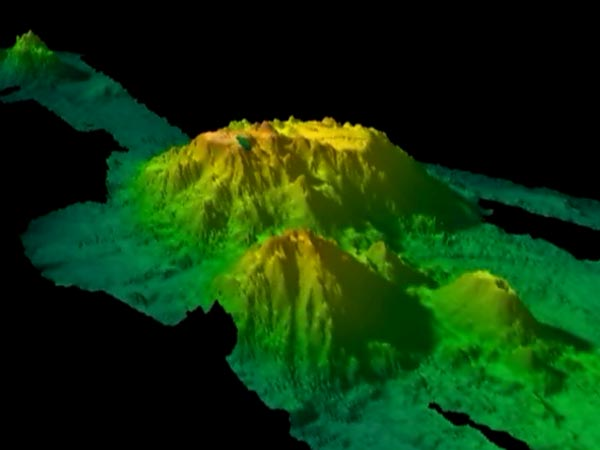
- 3-dimensional bathymetric mapping, made during the 1999 expedition.
- 3-dimensional bathymetric mapping, made during the 1999 expedition.
- Summit depth: 160 m (525 ft)
- Height: 3,900 m (12,795 ft)

Location
- Coordinates: 54°34.80′N 150°26.40′W

Geology
- Type: Seamount (underwater volcano)
- Volcanic arc/chain: Cobb–Eickelberg Seamount chain
- Age of rock: 33 million years

Patton Seamount is a prominent seamount (underwater volcano) in the Cobb–Eickelberg Seamount chain in the Gulf of Alaska. Located 166 nmi (307 km; 191 mi) east of Kodiak Island and reaching to within 160 m (520 ft) of the ocean surface, Patton is one of the largest seamounts in the Cobb–Eickelberg Seamount chain. It was originally created near the coast of Oregon by the Cobb hotspot 33 million years ago and was moved to its present location by tectonic plate movement. Patton is one of the most well-understood seamounts, as a major expedition using DSV Alvin in 1999 and another in 2002 helped define the scope of the seamount's biological community. Like other large seamounts, Patton acts as an ecological hub for sea life. Dives have revealed that the volcano is heavily encrusted in sea life of various forms, including sea stars, corals, king crabs, demersal rockfish, and other species.

== Geology ==
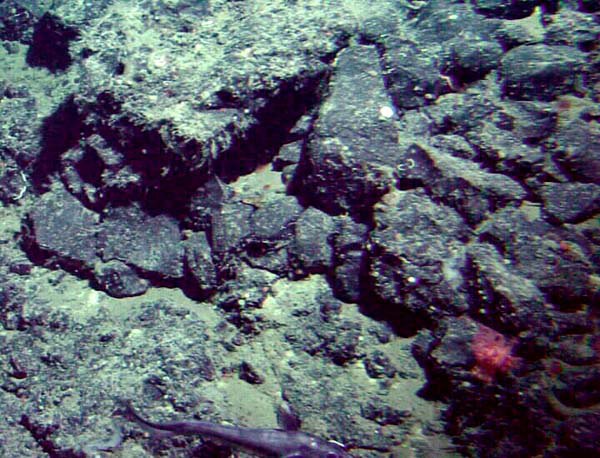
Segmented basalt on Patton Seamount. A small coral and squid can also be seen to the lower right.

Patton Seamount was created by the Cobb hotspot, and it lies in the Cobb–Eickelberg Seamount chain. The Cobb chain is unusual in that it is not one individual volcanic chain, but a mosaic of many, created by several hotspots that now lie along the western coast of North America. Patton Seamount lies near the northwestern edge of the chain, in the Gulf of Alaska, and is 33 million years of age, among the oldest in the group. The part of the chain that Patton Seamount lies in is known variably as either the "Gulf of Alaska Seamounts" or the "Patton Seamounts." The Gulf seamounts are the best-known and most heavily studied features in the chain.

Patton itself is over 10,000 ft (3,000 m) tall and 2 mi (3 km) wide at is base, and originally formed off the coast of Washington 33 million years ago. It has since been moved to its present Gulf location by the northwestern movement of the Pacific Plate. Dives indicate that the structure of Patton Seamount is rough near the top, with many boulders, and consists of much broader, finer particulates near the ocean bottom. Not much is known about Patton geologically, as expeditions have mostly focused on its biology.

== Ecology ==
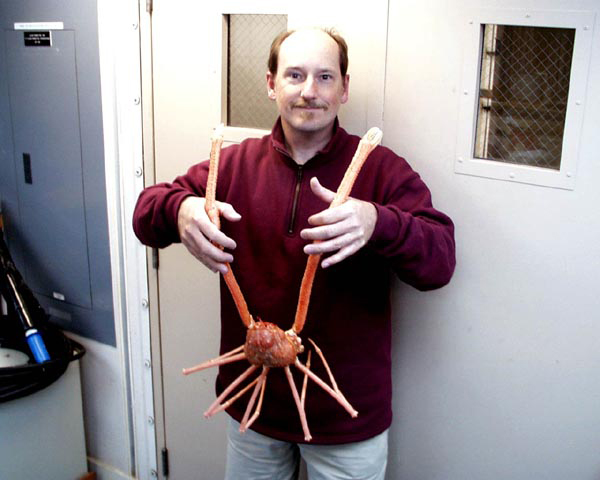
A male specimen of large-clawed spider crab (Macroregonia macrochiera) collected on Patton Seamount during the 2002 expeditions, at a depth of 3,300 m (10,827 ft). This is the deepest that they have yet been observed.

Patton Seamount is ecologically vibrant: geologist Randy Keller of the Oregon State University once said "...it's just astonishing how much there is around you. You see rocky outcroppings and there's life everywhere—sponges and sea stars." Patton Seamount, like many other seamounts, serves as an "oasis of life" for resident organisms. Isolated populations found on seamounts like Patton have been shown to have high levels of endemism and specialization, and Patton Seamount is almost completely encrusted in life.

Limited-scale fishing operations and scientific investigations were carried around in the 80s and 90s, mostly due to the rough nature of the seamounts, and the difficulty of sampling at such depths. July 1999 marked the first detailed observations on the seamount, in an expedition based on the RV Atlantis and utilizing the DSV Alvin. This cruise would be followed by a more extant expedition, covering all of the Patton seamounts, in 2002, for which the Patton cruise served as a model. 8 dives were conducted during the cruise, the deepest being 3,375 m (11,073 ft) deep, and 86,718 m^{2} (933,425 sq ft) of the seamount's surface was surveyed.

The researchers found that the volcano's ecosystem could be divided into three parts or faunal assemblies. First is a shallow ecosystem, predominated by demersal rockfish of the (Sebastes) and Sebastolobus genera. Other residents include Embassichthys bathybius, Lithodes aequispinus, Florometra spp., brittle stars, sea anemones, and sea stars. The mid-range community had a greater degree of suspension feeders, including Psolus spp., corals, and sponges. It also included Albatrossia pectoralis and Anoplopoma fimbria. The deepest community was distinct from the two above it, as it was populated less by sessile animals and more by more mobile ones. Especially notable are Coryphaenoides spp., Antimora microlepis, and Macroregonia macrochira.

A complete right whale skeleton was discovered on the seamount in 2005. The skeleton had been mostly stripped of flesh when it was found, indicating that it had probably spent many years on the ocean bottom. Although it was not obvious from surrounding fauna, whale falls like this may be boons for organisms living in ordinarily resource-poor regions.
