= Kodiak–Bowie Seamount chain =

Undersea landform in the Gulf of Alaska

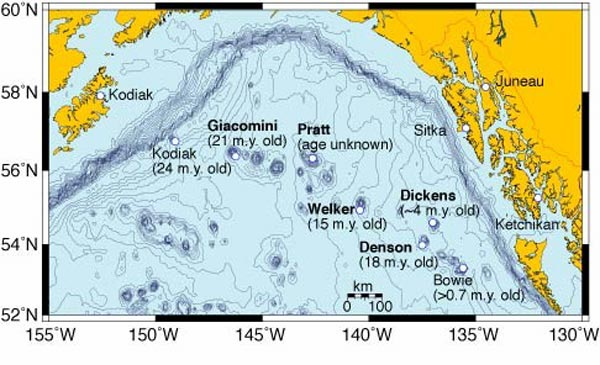
- Map of the Kodiak-Bowie Seamount chain

Location
- Location: North Pacific Ocean
- Country: Canada/United States

The Kodiak–Bowie Seamount chain, also called the Pratt–Welker Seamount chain and the Kodiak Seamounts, is a seamount chain in the southeastern Gulf of Alaska stretching from the Aleutian Trench in the north to Bowie Seamount, the youngest volcano in the chain, which lies 180 km (112 mi) west of Haida Gwaii, British Columbia, Canada. The oldest volcano in the chain is the Kodiak Seamount. Although the Kodiak Seamount is the oldest extant seamount in the Kodiak-Bowie chain, the adjacent lower slope contains transverse scars indicating earlier subduction of seamounts.

The Kodiak–Bowie Seamount chain is mostly extinct volcanoes that formed above the Bowie hotspot. This is a 100-to-150-km-wide morphological swell presumably of thickened hotspot generated crust, although there are no seismic refraction data across the swell to define crustal thickness. The crest of one such peak, Patton Seamount originally formed off Washington state as a submerged volcano 33 million years ago. Over time, as the Pacific Plate moved steadily northwest, Patton Seamount has carried off the Bowie hotspot and into the Gulf of Alaska. New volcanoes were formed one after another over the hotspot, creating the Kodiak–Bowie Seamount chain.

Explorations of the Kodiak–Bowie Seamount chain have shown that despite the fact that most of the seamounts were created by the Bowie hotspot, all are unique in their size, shape, and volcanic features. The seamounts teem with deep-sea corals, sponges, and fish. Recent expeditions to these seamounts using crewed submersibles and ROVs have discovered many marine species and have greatly expanded the knowledge of the range of deep sea corals in this region. For example, the Bowie Seamount is a biologically rich area with a dynamic and productive ecosystem. Because of this unique biological rich area, Bowie Seamount was declared a Pilot Marine Protected Area on December 8, 1998.

The Kodiak–Bowie seamount chain is at the northern triple junction between the Pacific, North American, and Juan de Fuca plates. Available age determinations on Kodiak and Giacomini Seamounts give an approximate average rate of movement along the chain of 6.5 cm (3 in) per year.

== Volcanoes ==
Volcanoes in the chain include:

- Kodiak Seamount (24 m.y. old)
- Giacomini Seamount (21 m.y. old)
- Pratt Seamount (age unknown)
- Welker Seamount (15 m.y. old)
- Dickens Seamount (~4 m.y. old)
- Denson Seamount (18 .m.y. old)
- Durgin Seamount
- Brown Seamount
- Quinn Seamount
- Surveyor Seamount
- Peirce Seamount
- Hodgkins Seamount
- Bowie Seamount (>0.7 m.y. old)
- Tuzo Wilson Seamounts
