= Peirce Seamount =

Member of the Kodiak-Bowie Seamount chain in the north Pacific

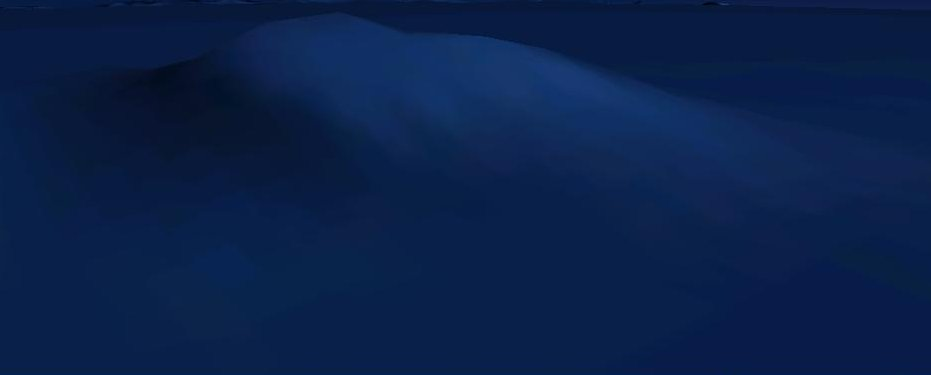

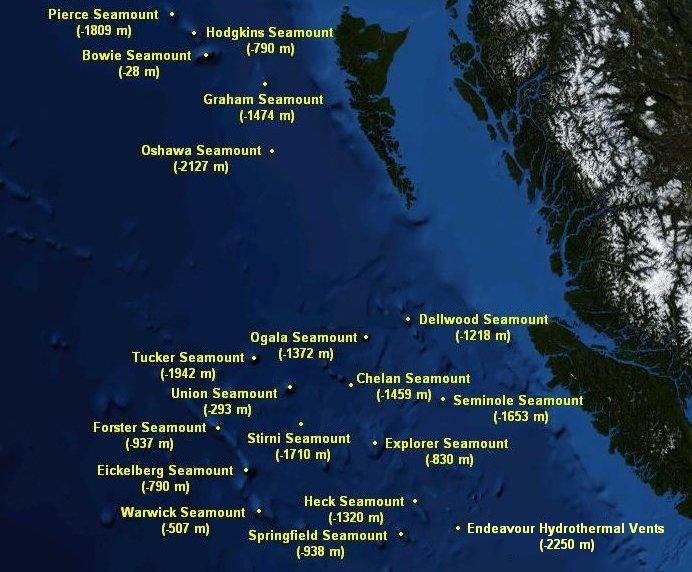
- Summit depth: 1,809 m (5,935 ft)

Location
- Location: North Pacific Ocean
- Coordinates: 53.44°N 136.32°W
- Country: Canada

Geology
- Type: Submarine volcano

Peirce Seamount, also called Pierce Seamount, is a seamount located in the Pacific Ocean west of the Queen Charlotte Islands, British Columbia, Canada. It lies between Denson Seamount and Hodgkins Seamount and is member of the Kodiak-Bowie Seamount chain, a chain of seamounts in southeastern Gulf of Alaska stretching from the Aleutian Trench in the north to Bowie Seamount in the south.

== See also ==
- List of volcanoes in Canada
- Volcanism of Canada
- Volcanism of Western Canada
