= Brown Bear Seamount =

Underwater volcano west of Oregon

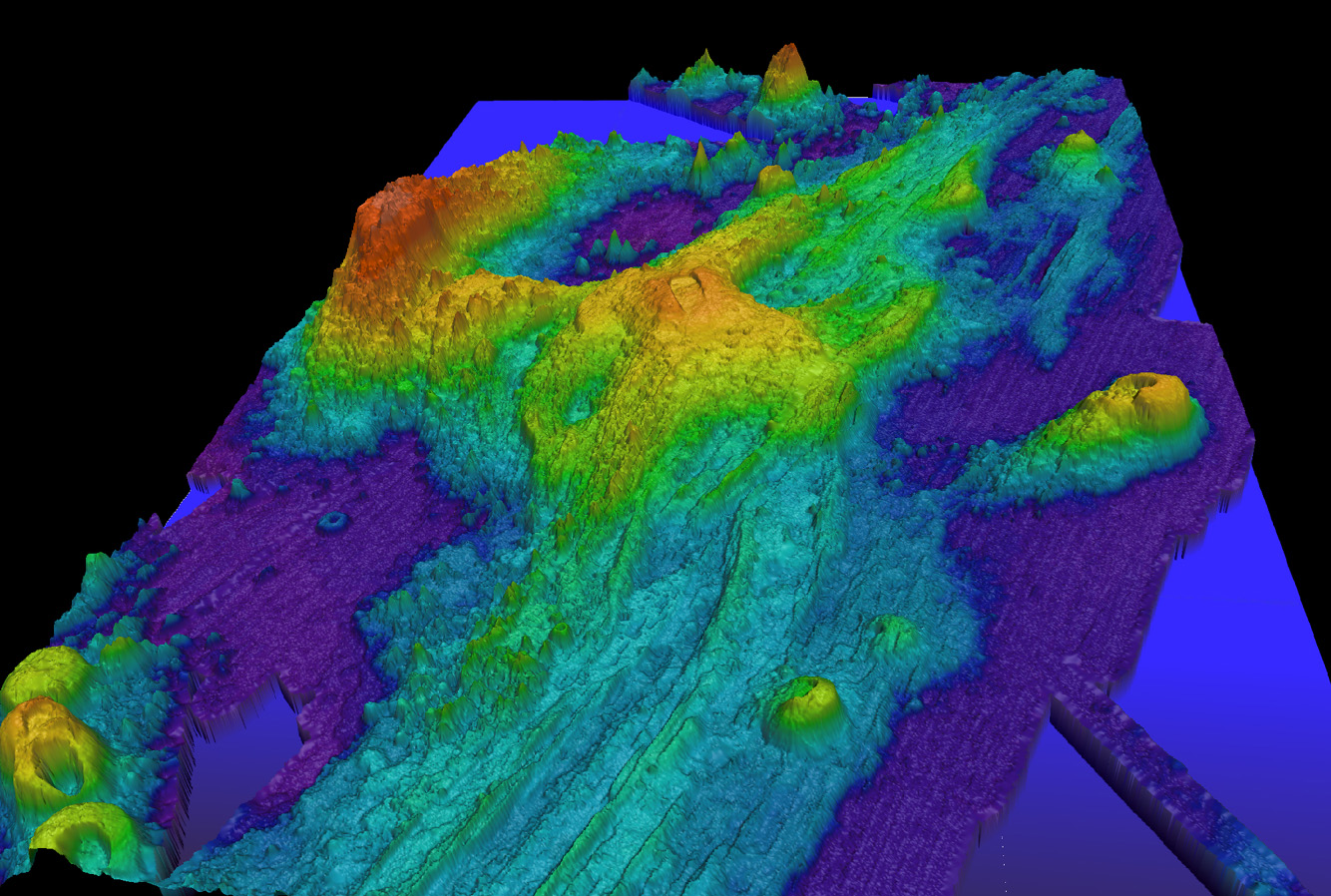
- Brown Bear Seamount on the left, Axial Seamount in the center.
- Brown Bear Seamount on the left, Axial Seamount in the center.
- Summit depth: 1,410 m (4,626 ft)
- Height: 1,100 m (3,609 ft)

Location
- Coordinates: 46°02.40′N 130°27.60′W

Geology
- Type: Seamount (underwater volcano), hotspot volcano
- Last eruption: 1998

Brown Bear Seamount is a seamount (underwater volcano) approximately 300 mi (483 km) west of the coast of Oregon. It is connected to the larger Axial Seamount by a small ridge. Brown Bear Seamount was created by the Cobb hotspot, and is located on the near west of the Juan de Fuca Ridge. It has not been affected by ocean spreading as much as its neighbor, and is therefore not quite as geologically complex. Brown Bear is the second youngest volcano in the chain, after Axial. No eruptions are known.
