= Bowie Seamount =

Submarine volcano in the northeastern Pacific Ocean

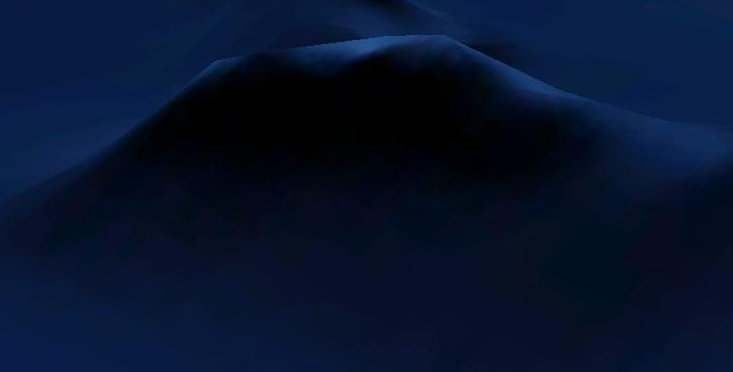
- 3D depiction of Bowie Seamount

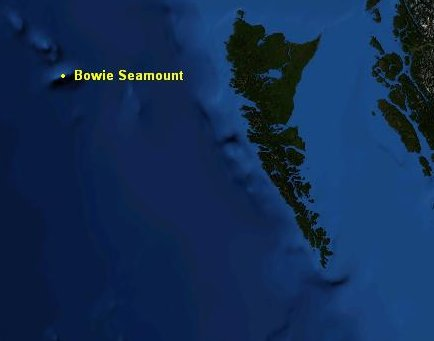
- Map of Bowie Seamount
- Summit depth: 24 m (79 ft)
- Height: ~3,000 m (9,843 ft)

Location
- Location: North Pacific Ocean, 180 km (112 mi) west of the Haida Gwaii
- Coordinates: 53°18′24.93″N 135°39′33.23″W
- Country: Canada

Geology
- Type: Submarine volcano
- Volcanic arc/chain: Kodiak-Bowie Seamount chain
- Age of rock: Pleistocene
- Last eruption: 18,000 years ago

Bowie Seamount, or SG̱áan Ḵínghlas ("Supernatural One Looking Outward") in the Haida language, is a large submarine volcano in the northeastern Pacific Ocean, located 180 km (110 mi) west of Haida Gwaii, British Columbia, Canada. The seamount is also known as Bowie Bank. The English name for the feature is after William Bowie of the United States Coast and Geodetic Survey.

The volcano has a flat-topped summit rising about 3,000 m (10,000 ft) above the seabed, to 24 m (79 ft) below sea level. The seamount lies at the southern end of a long underwater volcanic mountain range called the Pratt-Welker or Kodiak-Bowie Seamount chain, stretching from the Aleutian Trench in the north almost to Haida Gwaii in the south.

Bowie Seamount lies on the Pacific Plate, a large segment of the Earth's surface which moves in a northwestern direction under the Pacific Ocean. It is adjacent to two other submarine volcanoes; Hodgkins Seamount on its northern flank and Graham Seamount on its eastern flank.

== Geology ==
=== Structure ===
Seamounts are volcanic mountains which rise from the seafloor. The unlimited supply of water surrounding these volcanoes can cause them to behave differently from volcanoes on land. The lava emitted in eruptions at Bowie Seamount is made of basalt, a common gray to black or dark brown volcanic rock low in silica content (the lava is mafic). When basaltic lava makes contact with the cold sea water, it may cool very rapidly to form pillow lava, through which the hot lava breaks to form another pillow. Pillow lava is typically fine-grained, due to rapid cooling, with a glassy crust, and has radial jointing.

With a height of at least 3,000 m (10,000 ft) and rising to within only 24 m (79 ft) of the sea surface, Bowie Seamount is the shallowest submarine volcano on the British Columbia Coast, as well as in Canadian waters, and one of the shallowest submarine volcanoes in the northeast Pacific Ocean. Most seamounts are found hundreds to thousands of metres below sea level, and are therefore considered to be within the deep sea. If Bowie Seamount were on land it would be about 600 m (2,000 ft) higher than Whistler Mountain in southwestern British Columbia and 800 m (2,600 ft) lower than Mount Robson, the highest mountain in the Canadian portion of the Rocky Mountains.

Bowie Seamount is about 55 km (34 mi) long and 24 km (15 mi) wide. Its flat-topped summit is made of weakly consolidated tephra and consists of two terraces. The lowest terrace is about 230 m (750 ft) below sea level while the highest is about 80 m (260 ft) below sea level, but contains steep-sided secondary summits that rise to within 25 m (82 ft) below sea level. From a physical perspective, the effective size of the submarine volcano is considerably large. The effects of other submarine volcanoes along the Pacific Northwest, including Cobb Seamount off the coast of Washington, affect the composition and abundance of plankton up to 30 km (20 mi) away from the seamount summit due to the upwelling of nutrients from deeper waters. Because of its similar size, Bowie Seamount most likely has a similar effect on its adjacent waters.

=== Eruptive history ===
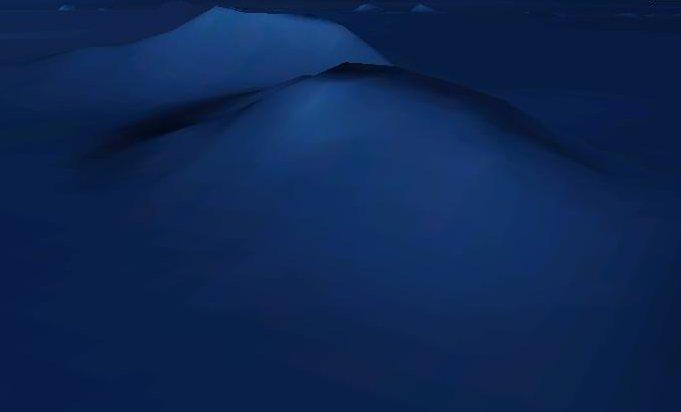
3D depiction of Hodgkins Seamount with Bowie Seamount in the background

Bowie Seamount was formed by submarine eruptions along fissures in the seabed throughout the last glacial, or "Wisconsinian", period, which began about 110,000 years ago and ended between 15,000 and 10,000 years ago. While most submarine volcanoes in the Pacific Ocean are more than one million years old, Bowie Seamount is relatively young. Its base was formed less than one million years ago, but its summit shows evidence of volcanic activity as recently as 18,000 years ago. This is recent in geological terms, suggesting the volcano may yet have some ongoing volcanic activity.

Close to Bowie's submerged summit, former coastlines cut by wave actions and beach deposits show that the submarine volcano would once have stood above sea level, as either a single volcanic island or as a small cluster of shoals that would have been volcanically active. Sea levels during the last glacial period, when Bowie Seamount was formed, were at least 100 m (300 ft) lower than they are today. It would have had a land area similar to, if not larger than, Midway Atoll in the central Pacific Ocean.

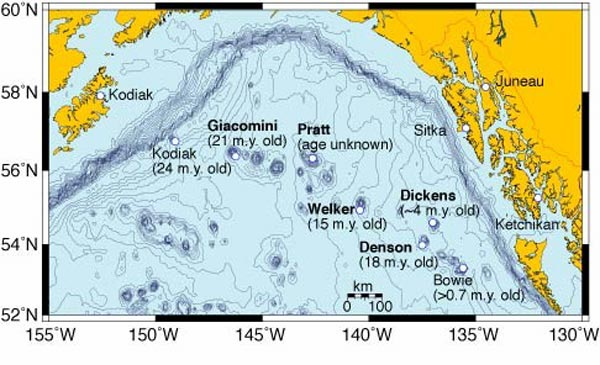
Map of the Kodiak-Bowie Seamount chain

=== Origins ===
There is some disagreement about the origin of Bowie seamount: Geological studies indicate that the Kodiak-Bowie Seamount chain may have formed above a center of upwelling magma called a mantle plume. The seamounts comprising the Kodiak-Bowie Seamount chain would be formed above the mantle plume and carried away from the mantle plume's magmatic source as the Pacific Plate moves in a northwesterly direction towards the Aleutian Trench, along the southern coastline of Alaska.

The volcanic rocks which make up some of the seamounts in the Kodiak-Bowie Seamount chain are unusual in that they have an acid-neutralizing chemical substance like typical ocean-island basalts but a low percentage of strontium as found at mid-ocean ridge basalts. However, the strontium-bearing volcanic rocks comprising Bowie Seamount also contain lead. Therefore, the magma mixtures that formed Bowie Seamount seem to have originated from varying degrees of partial melting of a depleted source in the Earth's mantle and basalts which had distinctly high lead isotopic ratios. Estimates during geological studies indicate that the abundance of the depleted-source component ranges from 60 to 80 percent of the erupted material.

Some aspects of the origin of the Kodiak-Bowie Seamount chain remain uncertain. The volcanic rocks found at the Tuzo Wilson Seamounts south of Bowie are fresh glassy pillow basalts of recent age, as would be expected if these seamounts are located above or close to a mantle plume south of Haida Gwaii. However, the origin of Bowie Seamount is less certain because even though the seafloor which Bowie lies on formed 16 million years ago during the late Miocene period, Bowie's summit shows evidence of recent volcanic activity. If Bowie Seamount formed above a mantle plume at the site presently occupied by the Tuzo Wilson Seamounts, it has been displaced from its magma source by about 625 km (390 mi) at a rate of about 4 cm (2 in) per year. The geologic history of Bowie Seamount is consistent with its flat-topped eroded summit, but the source for Bowie's recent volcanic activity remains uncertain. Still others, such as Dickens Seamount and Pratt Seamount further north of Bowie Seamount, fall a little to the side of the chain's expected trend. Another hypothesized origin of some or all seamounts in the Kodiak-Bowie Seamount chain is that they formed on top of the Explorer Ridge, a divergent tectonic plate boundary west of Vancouver Island, and have been displaced from it by seafloor spreading.

Although some of the seamounts in the Kodiak-Bowie Seamount chain appear to follow the expected age progression for a mantle plume trail, others, such as Denson Seamount, are older than that hypothesis would suggest. As a result, the Kodiak-Bowie Seamount chain has also been proposed by geoscientists to be a mix of ridge and mantle plume volcanism.

== Biology ==
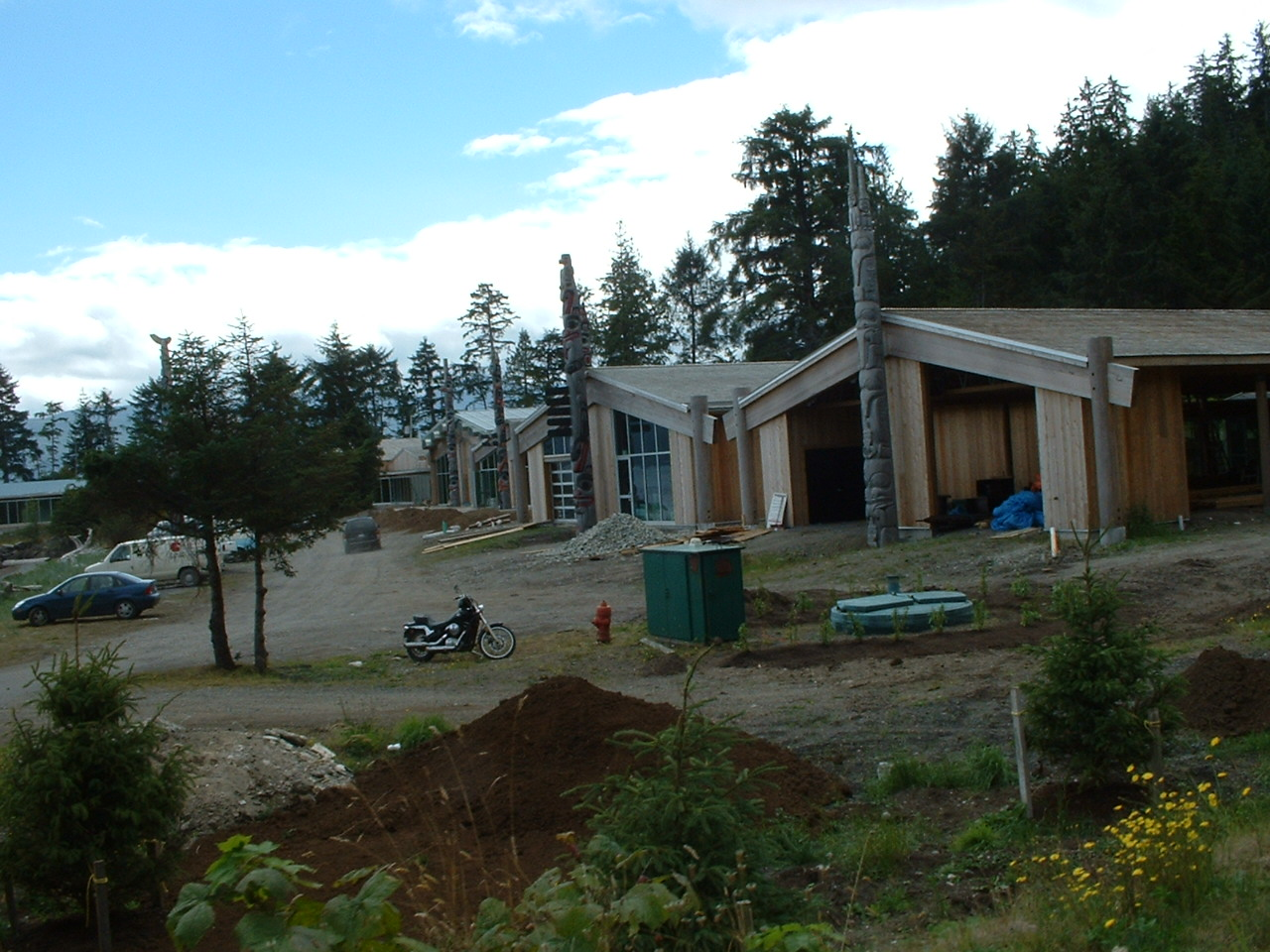
Haida Heritage Centre at Kaay Llnagaay where the Bowie Seamount Marine Protected Area was announced

Bowie Seamount supports a biologically rich area with a vigorous ecosystem. Studies have recorded high densities of crab, sea stars, sea anemones, sponges, squid, octopus, rockfish, halibut and sablefish. Eight species of marine mammal have been found in the Bowie Seamount area, including Steller sea lions, orca, humpback and sperm whales, along with 16 varieties of seabirds. This has made Bowie Seamount a rare habitat in the northeast Pacific Ocean and one of the most biologically rich submarine volcanoes on Earth. The rich marine life is due to the intense food supply of microscopic animals and plants, including phytoplankton and zooplankton.

=== SGaan Kinghlas-Bowie Seamount Marine Protected Area ===
Because of its biological richness, Bowie Seamount was designated as Canada's seventh Marine Protected Area on April 19, 2008 under the provisions of the Oceans Act. The announcement was made by federal Fisheries Minister Loyola Hearn and Gidansda Guujaaw, President of the Council of the Haida Nation, in Skidegate on Haida Gwaii (formerly called the Queen Charlotte Islands). During the announcement, Natural Resources Minister Gary Lunn said: "Bowie Seamount is an oceanic oasis in the deep sea, a rare and ecologically rich marine area, and our government is proud to take action to ensure it is protected. By working in partnership with the Council of the Haida Nation and groups like the World Wildlife Fund-Canada, we are ensuring this unique treasure is preserved for future generations."

The Marine Protected Area measures about 118 km (73 mi) long and 80 km (50 mi) wide, totaling an area of 6,131 km^{2} (2,367 sq mi). The Bowie Seamount Marine Protected Area also includes Peirce Seamount (also called Davidson Seamount) and Hodgkins Seamount. Previous to this designation, beginning in 1997, Bowie Seamount was a Haida marine protected area.

== Diving explorations and studies ==
The shallow depth of Bowie Seamount makes it the only underwater mountain off the British Columbia Coast easily reached using scuba diving equipment. In March 1969, dives were made at the submarine volcano by Canadian Forces Maritime Command divers from the CSS Parizeau. Two dives were made to the summit where monochrome photographs were taken to record the environment and some biological samples were gathered to detect possible harmful plants, animals, or bacteria. These specimens were identified at the Pacific Biological Station in Nanaimo, creating a list of eleven varieties of sea bottom invertebrates.

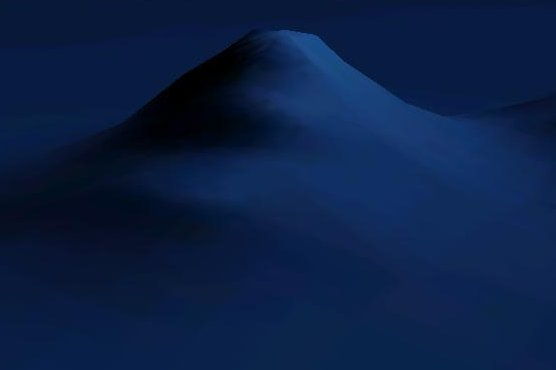
Eastern flank of Bowie Seamount

In August 1969, Canadian Forces Maritime Command divers made more dives during scientific studies by the Fisheries Research Board of Canada. They found very dense shoals of rockfish floating over Bowie's flat-topped summit and a variety of bottom life. A number of monochrome photographs were taken and a few seaweeds were collected, but no species record was created for other types of oceanic life around Bowie Seamount.

In November 1996, an issue of National Geographic magazine included an article titled "Realm of the Seamount", describing dives made at Bowie Seamount by two explorers named Bill Curtsinger and Eric Hiner. They explored the slopes of Bowie Seamount using scuba diving equipment down to 150 m (490 ft). Their photographs featured one of Bowie's rugged peaks thickly covered with seaweeds and colourful sea bottom invertebrates. Shoals of young rockfish were seen on Bowie's steep flanks.

Scientist Bill Austin of Khoyatan Marine Lab in the Northeast Pacific examined a video made during the National Geographic dives to identify the benthic flora and fauna of Bowie Seamount. From the video, Austin recognized some of the most noticeable invertebrates and noted that a few species generally occurring in the intertidal zone and in shallow subtidal environments were found deeper than might normally be expected, and were bigger than normal.

A team of five divers, led by photographer/videographer Neil McDaniel, visited the seamount August 3–5, 2003 and conducted a biological and photographic survey of the summit down to depths of about 40 m (130 ft). A total of 18 taxa of algae, 83 taxa of conspicuous invertebrates and 12 taxa of fishes were documented, approximately 180 underwater still photographs were taken and approximately 90 minutes of digital video were recorded. Of particular note were the dense schools of rockfish hovering over the summit and numerous curious prowfish.

== Indigenous people ==
To the Haida, the indigenous people who played a key role in establishing the Bowie Seamount Marine Protected Area, the submarine volcano is called SG̱aan Ḵinghlas. In Haida language it means "Supernatural Being Looking Outward".

Haida have long recognized seamount as a special place. Gidansda Guujaaw, former President of the Council of the Haida Nation, has said: "SG̱aan Ḵinghlas represents a shift in recognizing the need for respect and care for the Earth. This is a very significant turning point in reversing the trends that have been leading to the depletion of life in the sea."

== Marine hazard ==
Given its shallow depth, Bowie Bank is a potential marine hazard. Waves up to 27 m (89 ft) high have been recorded along the British Columbia Coast during heavy weather, enough to expose the bank by wave troughs and cause devastation to any vessel transiting the seamount. For this reason, Environment Canada has recognized Bowie Seamount as a hazard to navigation, and it is avoided by shipping vessels.

== See also ==
- Volcanism of Western Canada
- List of volcanoes in Canada
- List of Marine Protected Areas of Canada
- Bowie hotspot
