= Kodiak Seamount =

Oldest seamount in the Kodiak-Bowie Seamount chain

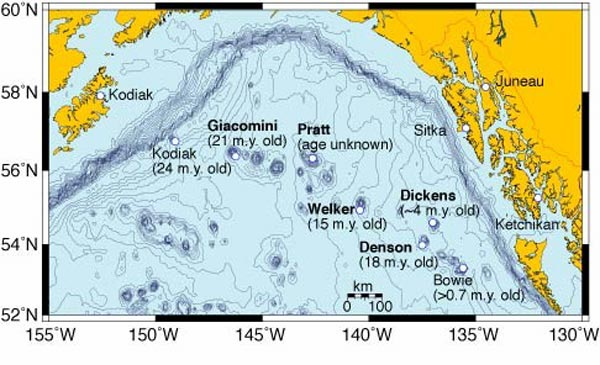
- Map of Kodiak-Bowie Seamount chain
- Map of Kodiak-Bowie Seamount chain
- Summit depth: 2,300 m (7,500 ft)

Location
- Location: North Pacific Ocean, 120 miles southeast of Kodiak Island
- Country: United States

Geology
- Type: Guyot
- Volcanic arc/chain: Kodiak-Bowie Seamount chain
- Age of rock: 24 million years

Kodiak Seamount is the oldest seamount in the Kodiak-Bowie Seamount chain, with an estimated age of 24 million years. It lies at the northernmost end of the chain and its flat-topped summit is strewn with fault lines. Like the rest of the Kodiak-Bowie seamounts, it was formed by the Bowie hotspot.

Kodiak Seamount will eventually be destroyed by subduction by the Aleutian Trench once it is carried into the trench by the ongoing plate motion, although this will not fully occur for several million more years if the current rate of motion is maintained. Because of Kodiak Seamount's approach into the Aleutian Trench, it is literally cracking up under the stress. Although Kodiak is the oldest extant seamount in the Kodiak-Bowie chain, the adjacent lower slope contains transverse scars indicating earlier subduction of seamounts.

== See also ==
- Bowie Seamount
