= Hodgkins Seamount =

Seamount in the Kodiak-Bowie Seamount chain in the north Pacific

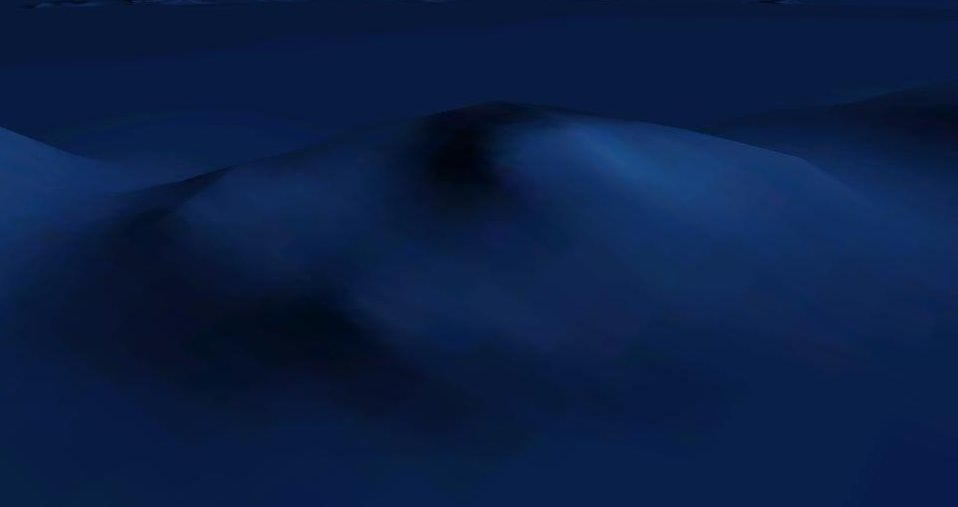

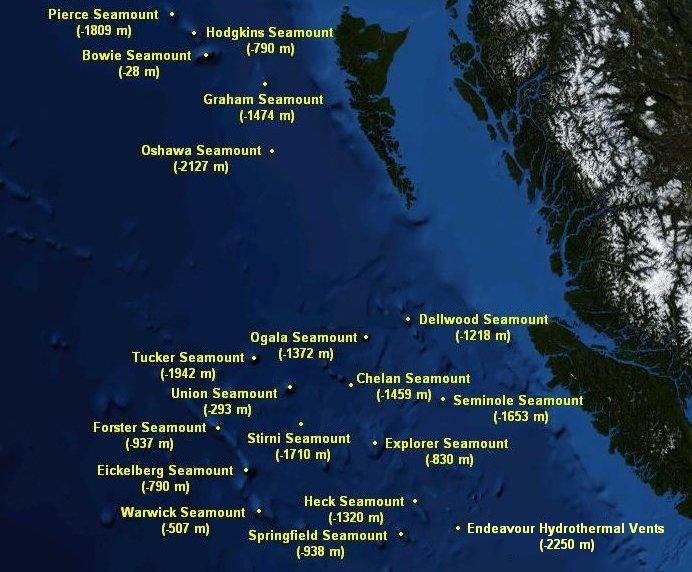
- Map of submarine volcanoes on the coast of British Columbia, including Hodgkins Seamount
- Summit depth: 790 m (2,592 ft)

Location
- Location: North Pacific Ocean, south of Pierce Seamount and north of Bowie Seamount
- Coordinates: 53.30°N 136.5°W
- Country: Canada

Geology
- Type: Submarine volcano
- Volcanic arc/chain: Kodiak-Bowie Seamount chain

Hodgkins Seamount is a seamount in the Kodiak-Bowie Seamount chain, located south of Pierce Seamount and north of Bowie Seamount. It has apparently experienced two generically different episodes of volcanism, separated by about 12 million years. Like the rest of the Kodiak-Bowie seamounts, it was formed by the Bowie hotspot.

== See also ==
- Volcanism of Canada
- Volcanism of Western Canada
- List of volcanoes in Canada
