= ASHES vent field =

Hydrothermal field in the eastern Pacific Ocean

Axial Seamount Hydrothermal Emissions Study (ASHES) Vent Field
- A series of hydrothermal vents atop Axial Seamount.
- Location within Earth
- Location: Juan de Fuca Ridge
- Coordinates: 45°55′35.76″N 129°58′46.2″W
- Area: 2,826 square metres (30,420 ft^{2})
- Min. elevation: 1,550 metres (5,090 ft)

The Axial Seamount Hydrothermal Emissions Study or ASHES vent field is a basalt-hosted hydrothermal vent field located on the side of Axial Seamount's caldera at approximately 1,550 metres (5,090 ft) deep. The site is distinct from other hydrothermal ecosystems as a long-term study site of the Ocean Observatories Initiative's Regional Cable Array, one of the few hydrothermal systems with real-time data.

== Protection ==
Human activity at ASHES is almost entirely scientific, with most impact coming from research expeditions, observatory maintenance, and ROV operations.

As with Axial Seamount, ASHES is located 300 miles (480 km) off the coast of Oregon and as such is classified as a location in the high seas and not a marine protected area.
