= President Jackson Seamounts =

Series of seamounts on the Pacific Plate off California

- Location within Pacific Ocean
- Summit area: 24 km^{3} (6 cu mi) to 68 km^{3} (16 cu mi)

Location
- Group: 8 linearly aligned seamounts
- Coordinates: 42°30.60′N 127°46.20′W
- Country: United States

Geology
- Type: Underwater volcanic chain

The President Jackson Seamounts are a series of seamounts (underwater volcanoes) located on the Pacific Plate, off of California. It consists of 8 seamounts, 4 independent and 4 morpohologically fused, just west of the northern Gorda Ridge. They are generally very small, and arranged linearly.

The assembly consists of 8 seamounts arranged in a chain. The easternmost of the seamounts is located about 53 km (33 mi) east of the axial ridge that spawned the volcanoes, Gorda Ridge. The chain was mapped initially with SeaBeam equipment in 1985, however its incomplete coverage limited its usefulness. A GLORIA sidescan survey conducted in 1986 further established the rough size and locations of the seamounts. A further sampling cruise by the United States Geological Survey (USGS) recovered pillow lava and hyaloclastite from 4 of the 8 volcanoes. The samples seemed to be of more primitive origin then those erupted elsewhere on the ridge. In 1998, the Monterey Bay Aquarium Research Institute conducted two dives on a cone cluster located southeast of the main structure.

The chain consists of eight volcanoes. Of these, four are self-dependent, whereas the other four form twin fused, morphologically complex, flat-topped structures. The volcanoes form a linear chain, and are relatively small, measuring less than 10 km (6 mi) in diameter, and are nearly circular in shape. They average 47 km^{3} (11 cu mi)±14 km^{3} (3 cu mi) in volume, but range from 24 km^{3} (6 cu mi) to 68 km^{3} (16 cu mi). In addition to the eight main seamounts, there is a scattered disk of minor volcanic cones and flows about 13 km (8 mi) southeast of the chain.

The summits of the seamounts, with the exception of the second one from the northwest, are all flat. Several have nested or cross-layered calderas and pit craters (29 in total), many of which push into the flank of the volcanoes. In several cases, newer volcanic structures have all but erased older ones. In addition to all this the seamounts are pocketed by multiple small cones, and are littered by debris ranging far and wide from the range. There is evidence of erosional activity throughout, with erosional valleys and landslide debris visible.

== See also ==
- Vance Seamounts
