= Bowie hotspot =

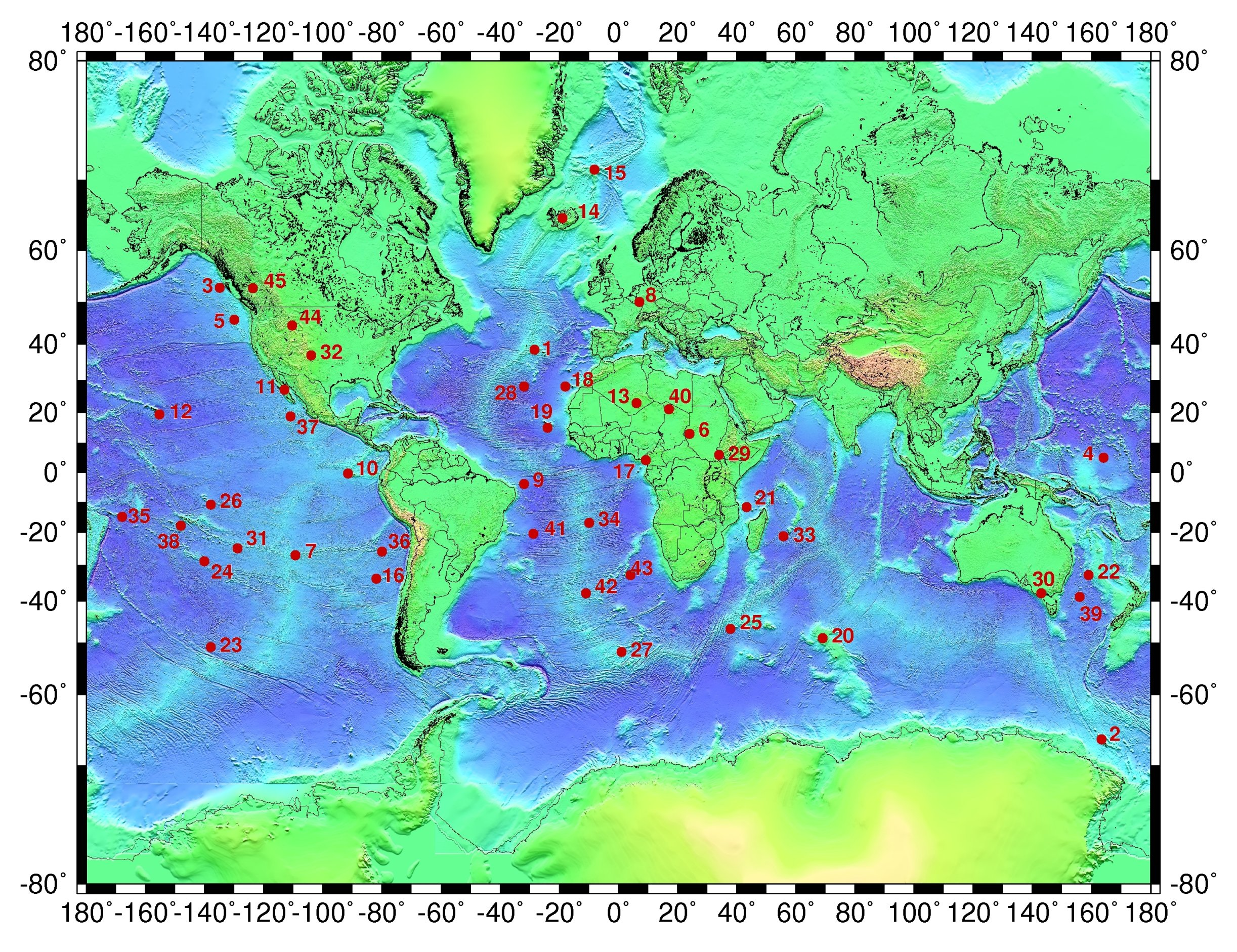
The Bowie hotspot is marked 3 on map.

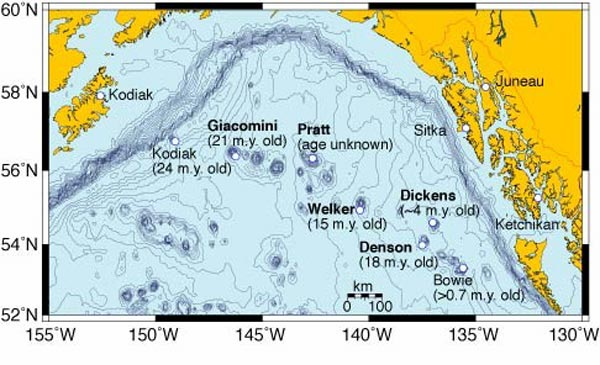
Over millions of years, the Pacific Plate has moved over the Bowie hotspot, creating the Kodiak-Bowie Seamount chain in the Gulf of Alaska

The Bowie hotspot is a volcanic hotspot, located 180 kilometres (110 mi) west of Haida Gwaii in the Pacific Ocean.

Almost all magma created by the hotspot has the composition of basalt, and so the volcanoes are constructed almost entirely of this igneous rock. The eruptions from the Bowie hotspot are effusive eruptions because basaltic magma is relatively fluid compared with magmas typically involved in more explosive eruptions, such as the andesitic magmas that produce some of the spectacular and dangerous eruptions around the margins of the Pacific Ocean.

Bowie hotspot is believed to be perhaps 100 to 150 km (60 to 90 mi) wide and underlain by a mantle plume that is relatively deep. It is also considerably weak.

Eruptions from the Bowie hotspot have left a trail of underwater mountains across the Pacific, called the Kodiak-Bowie Seamount chain, which is an underwater mountain region of seamounts along a line beneath the northern Pacific Ocean. The oldest volcano in the chain is Kodiak Seamount with an estimated age of 24 million years and the youngest called Bowie Seamount.

Geological studies show that the base of Bowie Seamount formed less than a million years ago. The summit of Bowie Seamount is even younger and shows signs of having been active as recently as 18,000 years ago. Because of its shallow depth, some geologists believe Bowie Seamount was an active volcanic island throughout last ice age.

== See also ==
- Volcanism in Canada
- Geology of the Pacific Northwest
- Cobb hotspot
