= Tuzo Wilson Seamounts =

Two active submarine volcanoes off the coast of British Columbia, Canada

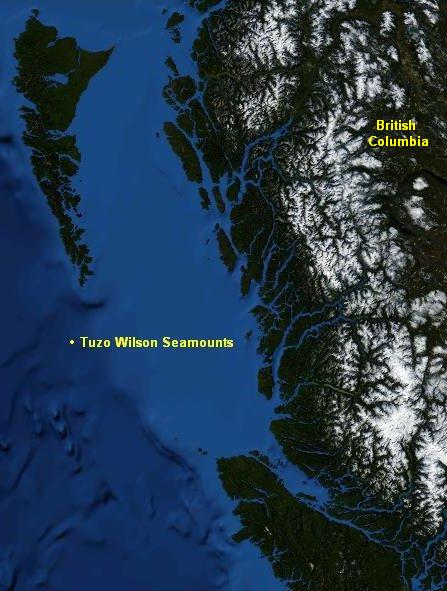
- Summit depth: ~1,410 m (4,626 ft)
- Height: 500 m (1,600 ft)

Location
- Location: 200 km (124 mi) northwest of Vancouver Island
- Coordinates: 51.4°N 130.9°W
- Country: Canada

Geology
- Type: Submarine volcanoes
- Volcanic arc/chain: Kodiak-Bowie Seamount chain
- Age of rock: Holocene
- Last eruption: Holocene (active)

The Tuzo Wilson Seamounts, also called J. Tuzo Wilson Knolls and Tuzo Wilson Knolls, are two young active submarine volcanoes off the coast of British Columbia, Canada, located 200 km (124 mi) northwest of Vancouver Island and south of the Haida Gwaii archipelago (briefly known as the Queen Charlotte Islands.) The two seamounts are members of the Kodiak-Bowie Seamount chain, rising 500 m (1,640 ft) to 700 m (2,297 ft) above the mean level of the northeastern Pacific Ocean and is a seismically active site southwest of the southern end of the Queen Charlotte Fault. They are named after Canadian geologist John Tuzo Wilson.

== Geology ==
The two submarine volcanoes are capped by hawaiite and are surrounded by numerous smaller vents, with a total edifice volume of about 12 km^{3}.

The lava emitted in eruptions at the Tuzo Wilson Seamounts is made of basalt, a common gray to black or dark brown extrusive volcanic rock low in silica content (the lava is mafic) that is usually fine-grained due to rapid cooling of lava. Glassy pillow lava is found at the seamounts, a type of rock typically formed when basaltic lava emerges from a submarine volcanic vent. The viscous lava gains a solid crust on contact with the water, and this crust cracks and oozes additional large blobs or "pillows" as more lava emerges from the advancing flow.

The origin of the Tuzo Wilson Seamounts is not without controversy. Some geologists theorize that the Tuzo Wilson Seamounts are linked with a hotspot because lava at the Tuzo Wilson Seamounts are fresh, glassy pillow basalts of recent age, as expected if these seamounts are located above or close to a hotspot south of the Haida Gwaii archipelago. Others prefer rifting as the cause of volcanism because the seamounts are close to the Explorer spreading center. No theory is close to airtight. Part of the controversy is due to the uncertain origin of the Kodiak-Bowie Seamount chain. There is a 360 km (224 mi) long gap between recently (Late Pleistocene to Holocene) active Bowie and Tuzo Wilson Seamounts, both of which have erupted alkaline basalts of similar composition. If a mantle plume was responsible for activity at both seamounts, then it is likely that there would be evidence for alkaline volcanic activity in the area between these two seamounts.

== See also ==
- Geology of the Pacific Northwest
- List of volcanoes in Canada
- Volcanology of Canada
- Volcanology of Western Canada
