= Vance Seamounts =

Group of seven submarine volcanoes located west of the Juan de Fuca Ridge

- Summit area: 15 to 67 km^{3} (4 to 16 cu mi)

Location
- Group: 7 linearly aligned seamounts

Geology
- Type: Underwater volcanic chain

The Vance Seamounts are a group of seven submarine volcanoes located west of the Juan de Fuca Ridge. Most of the seamounts contain a caldera. They are the southernmost of several near-ridge chains located on the Pacific Plate, stemming from the Juan de Fuca Ridge.

The easternmost five of the seven were surveyed using SeaBeam bathymetry. A chemical analysis of the lavas of the volcanoes indicated that the materials erupted from the volcanoes are relatively primitive. With the exception of one, the volcanoes form a nearly linear chain of circular volcanic cones. The second volcano from the northwest is not discretely shaped like the rest, rather it is a rough structure of lava cones and flows, which cover an area of at least 25 km × 10 km (16 mi × 6 mi). The six conical volcanoes (not including the odd one) range from 15 to 67 km^{3} (4 to 16 cu mi) in volume, averaging 34 ± 15 km^{3} (8 ± 4 cu mi).

Most of the volcanoes have gently sloping plateaus, in conformity with their low shield volcano–like profiles, which have been heavily modified by multiple calderas. These are generally very shallow, having been formed then filled almost completely by younger flows, leaving only parts of the rims untouched. Some also have landslide debris deposits near the base of the caldera rims, and several have since been breached (their sides have collapsed). Small cones lay along the seafloor surrounding the main formation. The southeastern volcanoes also have low-level parallel faults arranged linearly against the Juan de Fuca Ridge.

The construction of the cones left a lot of debris scattered across the ocean surface, much of which is aligned parallel to the ridge axis. The largest of these cones are nearly 2 km (1 mi) across, whereas the smallest appear to be only a few hundred meters in diameter.

In 2006, an expedition was conducted by the Monterey Bay Aquarium Research Institute on the seamount formations.

== See also ==
- List of submarine volcanoes
- President Jackson Seamounts
