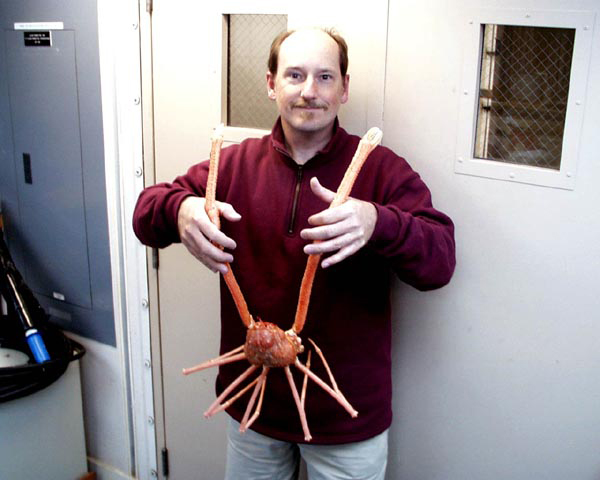
- Macroregonia macrochiera collected on Patton Seamount

Scientific classification
- Kingdom: Animalia
- Phylum: Arthropoda
- Clade: Pancrustacea
- Class: Malacostraca
- Order: Decapoda
- Suborder: Pleocyemata
- Infraorder: Brachyura
- Family: Oregoniidae
- Genus: Macroregonia; Sakai, 1978
- Species: M. macrochira

Binomial name
- Macroregonia macrochira Sakai, 1978

= Macroregonia =

Genus of crabs

Macroregonia is a genus of crabs containing only a single species, Macroregonia macrochiera. It is found from the coast around Pacific Ocean at depths of 900–3,000 m (3,000–9,800 ft).

== Description ==
Its carapace is ovate and anteriorly broadened, with two short rostral spines projecting forward. The surface of the carapace, chelipeds and walking legs are covered by numerous tubercles. The legs are elongated; its legspan reaches up to 80 cm (31 in). All pereiopods are cylindrical and sparsely setose; the merus of each walking leg bears a row of small spines along the extensor margin. It reaches up to 122 mm (4.8 in) in carapace length; it is the largest spider crab along Macrocheira kaempferi.
