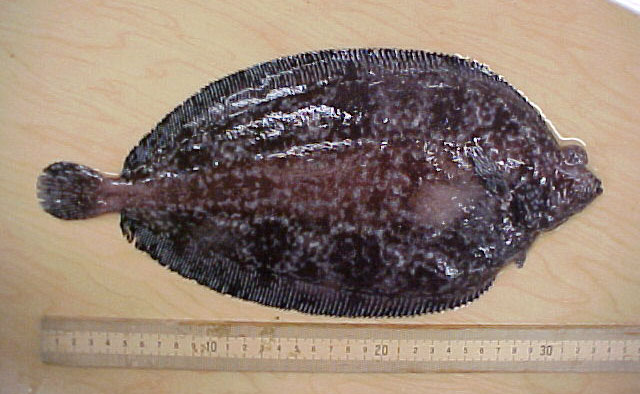

Scientific classification
- Domain: Eukaryota
- Kingdom: Animalia
- Phylum: Chordata
- Class: Actinopterygii
- Order: Carangiformes
- Suborder: Pleuronectoidei
- Family: Pleuronectidae
- Subfamily: Microstominae
- Genus: Microstomus
- Species: M. bathybius

Binomial name
- Microstomus bathybius (C. H. Gilbert, 1890)

Synonyms
- Cynicoglossus bathybius Gilbert, 1890; Embassichthys bathybius (Gilbert, 1890)

= Deepsea sole =

Species of fish

The deepsea sole (Microstomus bathybius) is a species of flatfish in the family Pleuronectidae. It is a bathydemersal species that lives on muddy bottoms at depths of between 41 and 1,800 metres (135 and 5,906 ft), though it is most often found at depths of 500 to 950 metres (1,640 to 3,120 ft). Its native habitat is the northern Pacific, from Japan to the Gulf of Alaska and down the Pacific coasts of Canada and the USA as far south as Mexico. It grows up to 47 centimetres (19 in) in length.
