= Tune Sakai =

Japanese carcinologist (1903–1986)

Tsune Sakai
- 酒井 恒
- Born: May 19, 1903; Kanade, Ōi, Ashigarakami District, Kanagawa Prefecture, Japan
- Died: February 22, 1986; Japan
- Education: Tokyo Bunrika University
- Known for: Studies on crabs
- Awards: Kanagawa Cultural Award (1952), Medal with Dark Blue Ribbon (1973), Order of the Rising Sun, Gold Rays with Rosette (1974)
- Scientific career
- Fields: Zoology, Carcinology
- Workplaces: Tokyo Bunrika University, Yokohama National University, Tokyo Kasei Gakuin University
- Thesis: Studies on Japanese Crabs (1939)

Tsune Sakai (Japanese: 酒井 恒, May 19, 1903 – February 22, 1986) was a Japanese zoologist known for his research on crabs. He was a professor at Yokohama National University and served as the first president of the Carcinological Society of Japan.

== Biography ==
Sakai was born in Kanade, Ōi, Ashigarakami District, Kanagawa Prefecture, Japan. He graduated from Kanagawa Normal School in 1924 and from the Department of Natural Sciences, Tokyo Higher Normal School in 1929. In 1932, he graduated from the Department of Zoology, Faculty of Science and Literature, Tokyo Bunrika University (now University of Tsukuba). In 1939, he received his Doctor of Science degree from Kyoto Imperial University for his dissertation Studies on Japanese Crabs.

He worked as an assistant at the Shimoda Marine Biological Station of Tokyo Bunrika University in 1932, later becoming a teacher at Gifu Women’s Normal School in 1938. In 1943, he became a professor at Kanagawa Normal School, and from 1949 served as a professor at the Faculty of Liberal Arts, Yokohama National University. He twice served as dean of the faculty (1954–55 and 1960–61), and was director of the Science Education Laboratory at Manazuru (the predecessor of the Manazuru Marine Education Laboratory). He retired in 1969 and taught at Tokyo Kasei Gakuin University from 1970 to 1979.

Sakai was awarded the Kanagawa Cultural Award in 1952, the Medal with Dark Blue Ribbon in 1973, and the Order of the Rising Sun, Gold Rays with Rosette in 1974. He served as the first president of the Carcinological Society of Japan (1961–1986) and as chairman of the Kanagawa Nature Conservation Association in 1978. After his death, he was posthumously granted the court rank of Jusanmi (Junior Third Rank). In 2007, he was named an honorary citizen of Ōi Town, Kanagawa.

He was well known for his research on crabs and served as an academic consultant to Emperor Shōwa in biological studies. In 1956, he explained the spawning habits of the red-clawed crab (Chiromantes haematocheir) at the Imperial Palace and presented the educational film Birth of a Crab to the Emperor.

== Species described ==
- Pugettia intermedia Sakai, 1938
- Neolithodes nipponensis Sakai, 1971
- Neopilumnoplax major Sakai, 1978 (now Beuroisia major)
- Goniopugettia tanakae Sakai, 1986

== Selected works ==
- Life of Crabs and Shrimps. Kaga Rikabunko, 1931.
- Illustrated Crabs of Japan. Sanseido, 1936.
- Research on Animals in the Tidal Flats. Sekai-sha, 1952; reissued by Kokudosha, 1980.
- Crabs. Shisei Shoin, 1956.
- Seashore Animals: Our Study of Nature. Chiyoda Shobo, 1968.
- Siebold and Fauna Japonica: The Dawn of Japanese Zoology (with Lipke Holthuis). Academic Press of Japan, 1970.
- Crabs of Japan. Kodansha, 1976.
- Crabs: Mysteries of Their Ecology. Kodansha, 1980.
