= Cobb Seamount =

Underwater volcano west of Grays Harbor, Washington, United States

- Summit depth: 34 m (112 ft)
- Height: 2,743 m (8,999 ft)
- Summit area: 824 km^{2} (318 sq mi)

Location
- Coordinates: 46°44′N 130°47′W

Geology
- Type: Seamount (underwater volcano), guyot
- Volcanic arc/chain: Cobb–Eickelberg Seamount chain
- Age of rock: about 3.3 million

History
- Discovered by: MV John N. Cobb, 1950

Cobb Seamount is a seamount (underwater volcano) and guyot located 500 km (310 mi) west of Grays Harbor, Washington, United States. Cobb Seamount is one of the seamounts in the Cobb–Eickelberg Seamount chain, a chain of underwater volcanoes created by the Cobb hotspot that terminates near the coast of Alaska. It lies just west of the Cascadia subduction zone, and was discovered in August 1950 by the U.S. Fish and Wildlife Service fisheries research vessel R/V John N. Cobb (FWS 1601). By 1967, over 927 km (576 mi) of soundings and dozens of samples from the seamount had been collected.

Cobb Seamount is geologically interesting for its terraced, pinnacle structure, and its biological community. Like many other seamounts, Cobb Seamount acts as a biological center of diversity, and supports a dense oceanic ecosystem. Relatively convenient access and an interesting biological setting have made the seamount an object of several scientific cruises and dives.

== Geology ==
Cobb Seamount lies 270 mi (430 km) off the coast of Washington, in the 8,500 ft (2,600 m)-deep Cascadia Basin. Argon–argon dating of basalts retrieved from the volcano show that it is about 3.3 million years in age. Cobb Seamount's slopes average 12° in grade, and are indented by four prominent terraces at various depths; this morphology is partly the result of sub-aerial exposure and wave erosion at sea level and partly due to volcanic processes far below wave base. The volcano's pinnacle is generally flat, and is defined by a pocketed area approximately 880 m (2,887 ft) by 577 m (1,893 ft) in size.

== Biology ==
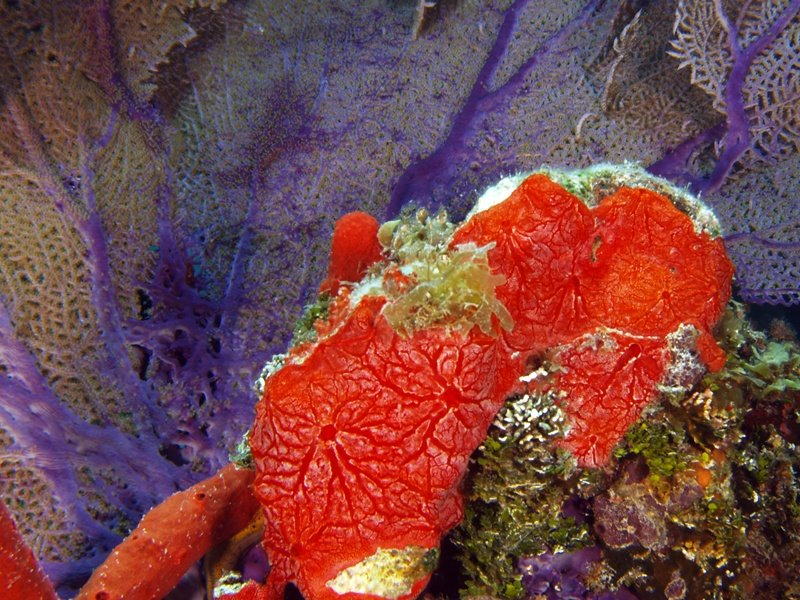
Red encrusting demosponge of the type found on Cobb Seamount.

Although it is one of over 100 underwater features in the region, Cobb Seamount is the only one known to extend well upwards into the region of the ocean penetrated by light. Like many other seamounts, Cobb Seamount is a local biological hotspot and functions as an "island of stability" for local organisms. It supports an extensive fish population, mostly Sebastes species and especially Sebastes miniatus. Bird life has been noted in the area of its summit, indicating that it is a prime fishing ground. For the complete known species inventory of Cobb Seamount, see Du Preez et al., 2015.

The summit of the volcano is dominated by a carpet of Hinnites multirugosus, which forms the base of a dense ecosystem of sponges and other small, sessile organisms. The species is otherwise scarce in its distribution in the Pacific; its abundance is accommodated by the scarcity of its chief predator, the sea star Orthasterias koehleri. The reason for the sea star's disparity is unknown, as it is extremely common on nearby seamounts.

The steeper flanks of the volcanoes are carpeted by coralline algae of the Lithothamnion and Lithophyllum genera. In some areas, Borgiola pustulosa is more common. Red-colored colonies of demosponge and related species predominant the ecosystem, which includes sea urchins, sponges, algae, anemones, and gastropods. While overall the species diversity on the seamount is lower than a comparable area on the surface, the species present have grown in greater numbers and have formed larger colonies, to the point that there was little to no bare rock surface on the seamount, and none has been found in expeditionary dives. Some endemism to the seamount has also been noted.

The seamount's abundant sea life has made it a target for heavy fishing since the 1960s. However, the fishing is very difficult to monitor, since Cobb lies outside of the U.S. Exclusive Economic Zone and therefore fishing vessels are not regulated. It is known that it has been the site of trawling, gill net, and long-line fishing for some time, mostly by the Japanese and Oregonian fleets. In 1993, the National Oceanic and Atmospheric Administration sponsored a study on the seamount, which concluded that concerns about overfishing at the seamount have some merit. The study also notes that fishermen there have different fishing patterns, because of different physical conditions at the seamount.

== Expeditions ==
Since its discovery in August 1950 by R/V John N. Cobb, Cobb Seamount has been the target of passing cruises and sampling missions, totaling to over 927 km (576 mi) of soundings and dozens of samples by 1967. In 1968, Project Sea Use, a multi-party expedition aboard the United States Coast and Geodetic Survey oceanographic research vessel USC&GS Oceanographer (R 101), visited the seamount, and much of what was initially known about it stems from the expedition. This was followed in 1970, two expeditions in the late 1970s, and 1992, however all have been fairly limited in scope. In 2012, an extensive scientific survey of Cobb Seamount was led jointly by Fisheries and Oceans Canada (DFO) and the United States National Oceanographic and Atmospheric Administration (NOAA). The survey used, among other methods, remotely operated vehicles (ROVs) and autonomous underwater vehicles (AUVs) to conduct high-resolution surveys of the benthic (seafloor) community above a depth of 1200 meters (3,937 feet).

There was tentative expert interest in installing an experimentation platform on Cobb Seamount. The seamount is an easily accessible distance from shore, and would give scientists the ability to work with Cobb Seamount's unique, isolated, and scientifically significant seamount biology. The idea was proposed by P. L. Peterson et al. in a presentation to the Offshore Technology Conference in 1969.
