= Denson Seamount =

Underwater volcano near the Canada–United States border

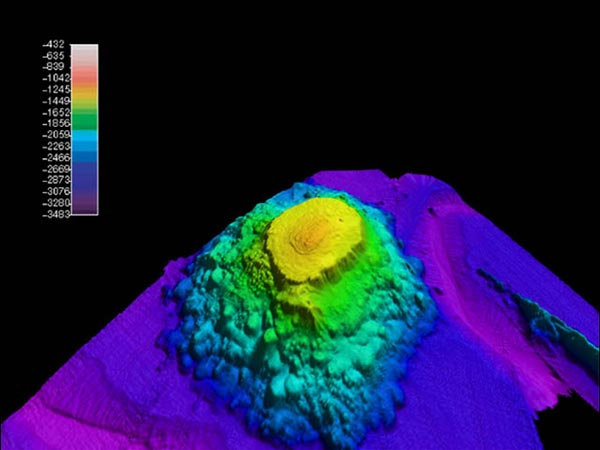
- Multibeam image of Denson Seamount, looking approximately northwest

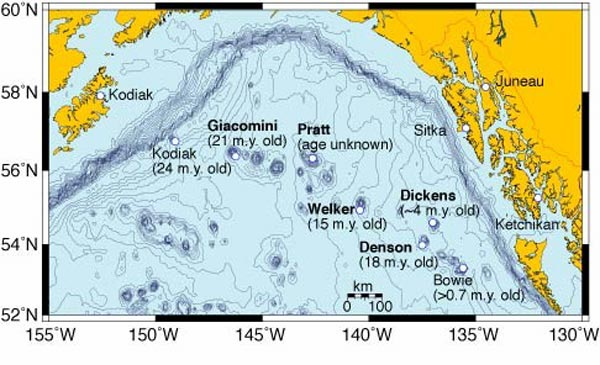
- Map of the Kodiak-Bowie Seamount chain
- Map of the Kodiak-Bowie Seamount chain

Location
- Location: North Pacific Ocean
- Coordinates: 54.0594°N 137.4170°W
- Country: United States

Geology
- Type: Submarine volcano
- Volcanic arc/chain: Kodiak-Bowie Seamount chain
- Age of rock: 18 million years old

Denson Seamount is a submarine volcano in the Kodiak-Bowie Seamount chain, with an estimated age of 18 million years. It lies at the southern end of the chain near the Canada–United States border. It was one of the underground volcanic extrusions investigated by the 2004 Gulf of Alaska Seamount Expedition. The expedition's goal was:

"Our goal was to gain an understanding of the geologic histories of the five previously unexplored seamounts in the Gulf of Alaska. To achieve this we created a full-coverage swath bathymetry map of each seamount and its surroundings, and we collected rock samples at all possible depths." -Randy Keller, Oregon State University

On August 6, 2004, the DSV Alvin dropped down near the Denson Seamount and collected basaltic rock to try to determine the age of the seamount. The search was difficult because the salty water had altered the volcanic rock over time, but they determined in lab tests that the Denson Seamount was about 18 million years old. The team used bathymetric mapping to render three-dimensional images of the Denson Seamount and its counterparts.
