= Undersea mountain range =

Mountain ranges that are mostly or entirely under the surface of an ocean

Undersea mountain ranges are mountain ranges that are mostly or entirely underwater, and specifically under the surface of an ocean. If they originated from current tectonic forces, they are often referred to as mid-ocean ridges. In contrast, if they were formed by past above-water volcanism, they are known as a seamount chain. The largest and best known undersea mountain range is a mid-ocean ridge, the Mid-Atlantic Ridge. It has been observed that, "similar to those on land, the undersea mountain ranges are the loci of frequent volcanic and earthquake activity".
