= Cobb hotspot =

Volcanic hotspot in the Pacific Ocean

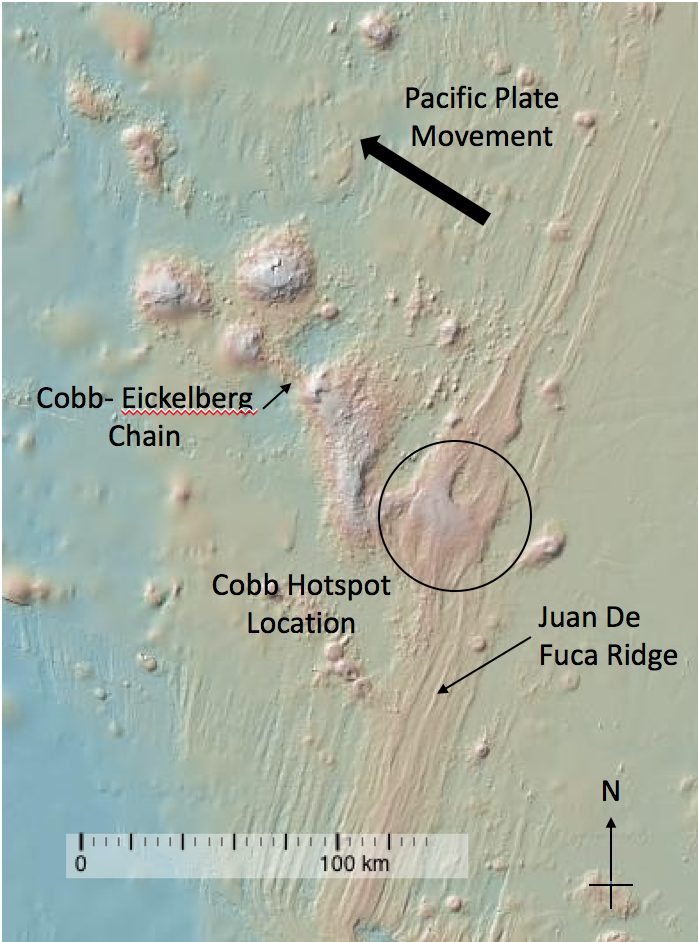
Map indicating the Cobb hotspot and surrounding features

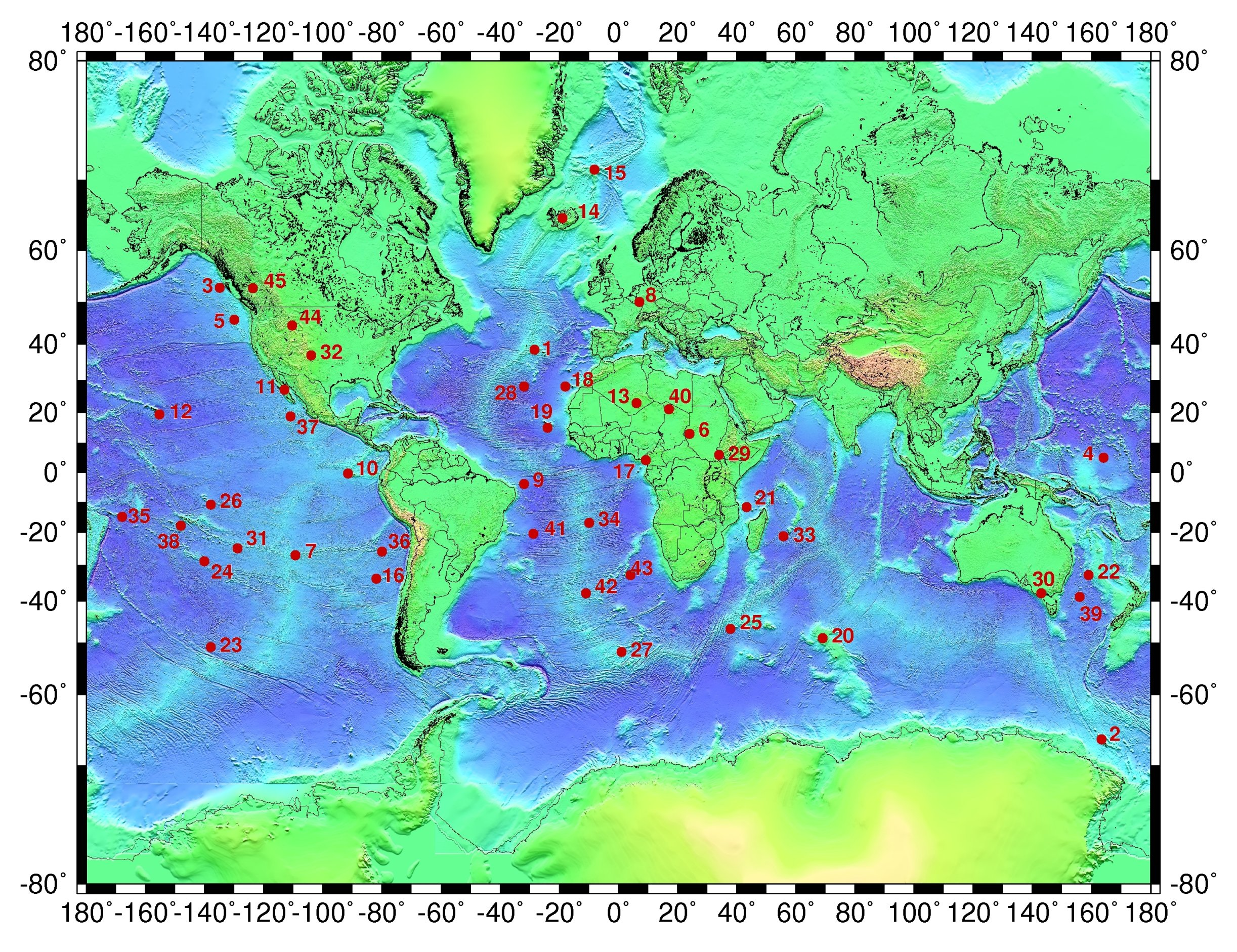
The Cobb hotspot is shown as 5 on map.

The Cobb hotspot is a marine volcanic hotspot at 46°N 130°W, which is 460 kilometers (290 mi) west of Oregon and Washington, United States, in the Pacific Ocean. Over geologic time, the Earth's surface has migrated with respect to the hotspot through plate tectonics, creating the Cobb–Eickelberg Seamount chain. The hotspot is currently collocated with the Juan de Fuca Ridge.

== Cobb Seamount chain ==
The Cobb hotspot has created an underwater mountain range that extends 1,800 km (1,100 mi) to the northwest and ends at the Aleutian Trench. The oldest mount in the chain is the Marchland Seamount, at 30 to 43 Ma (million years old). The old, northwestern end of the chain collides with a subduction zone; therefore, the true age of the hotspot is difficult to determine as the oceanic crust is being consumed. Axial Seamount is the hotspot's most recent eruptive center, which last erupted in 2015, 2011, and 1998. The central ridge of the hotspot is thicker than the surrounding crust by a few kilometers and may be accumulated buildup from the magma released at the hotspot, which is essentially a submarine volcano with a root twenty to forty kilometres (12 to 25 mi) in diameter, reaching a depth of 11 kilometres (6.8 mi) beneath the volcano. The magma flows at a rate of 0.3 to 0.8 m^{3}/s (11 to 28 cu ft/s). The caldera is 1,450 metres (4,760 ft) below sea level.

== Geochemistry ==
Hotspots are formed when magma from the lower mantle upwells to the crust and breaks through the surface, whether that be oceanic crust or continental. This movement of magma breaks through the upper mantle, or the lithosphere, and creates a volcanic spot. This does not mean that all volcanoes are hotspots; some are created through interactions at plate boundaries. Tectonic plates move over hotspots creating a chain of volcanically-formed mountains over time. This is supported by the theory of plate tectonics. The peaks and mountains left behind are no longer active volcanoes. Hotspots do not necessarily occur on a plate boundary, though the Cobb Hotspot does.

=== Comparisons with mid-ocean ridge basalts ===
The magmas from the spreading ridge and the hotspot have differences. For one, they contain dissimilar concentrations of compounds like Na_{2}O, CaO, and Sr at a given mafic level. This difference highlights that the magmas were formed at different depths in the mantle. It is theorized that the hotspot magma was melted deeper than that of the ridge. For these two masses of magma to exist, the magma at the Cobb Hotspot must be particularly hot. It is undetermined whether the hotspot was created from mantle-core boundary convection, as the end of the chain is subducting under another. The initial plume of magma would leave behind geologic evidence at the surface, but due to the consumption of the older end of the chain, this evidence is not visible.

=== Variations along the chain ===
Trace elements were used to discover that older mounts created by the Cobb Hotspot contained more minerals like olivine and augite, both mafic minerals. Younger mounts created by the hotspot contain more minerals like calcic plagioclase, augite, and pigeonite; they contain little to no olivine. These characteristics found at the younger mounts are like those found in basalts recovered from the Juan de Fuca Ridge. It is inferred that much of the difference in basalt composition along the chain is due to the time-dependent distance between hotspot and ridge. Oceanic crust thickens with distance from the mid-ocean ridge at which it originated. Therefore, as the Pacific plate migrated, the magma from the Cobb hotspot interacted with different thicknesses of crust. A thicker ocean crust would result in more differentiated basalt, while thinner crusts, like those at the current hotspot location, create less differentiated magma.

== Interaction of the Cobb hotspot and the Juan de Fuca Ridge ==
The magma supply to the Cobb hotspot is more primitive than that of the Juan de Fuca Ridge magma. As the archaic magma flows beneath the magma chamber of the ridge, it causes further melting and rapid cooling, which allows for fractional crystallization.

== See also ==
- Geology of the Pacific Northwest
