= Juan de Fuca Ridge =

Divergent plate boundary off the coast of the Pacific Northwest region of North America

Coordinates: 46°N 130°W

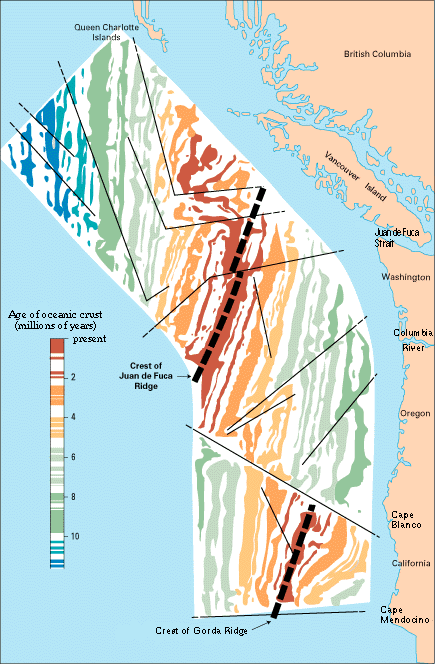
Location of the Juan de Fuca ridge off the coast of North America. Magnetic striping on either side of the ridge helps date the rock and determine spreading rate and age of the plate.

The Juan de Fuca Ridge is a mid-ocean spreading center and divergent plate boundary located off the coast of the Pacific Northwest region of North America, named after Juan de Fuca. The ridge separates the Pacific Plate to the west and the Juan de Fuca Plate to the east. It runs generally northward, with a length of approximately 500 kilometres (310 mi). The ridge is a section of what remains from the larger Pacific-Farallon Ridge which used to be the primary spreading center of this region, driving the Farallon Plate underneath the North American Plate through the process of plate tectonics. Today, the Juan de Fuca Ridge pushes the Juan de Fuca Plate underneath the North American plate, forming the Cascadia Subduction Zone.

== Discovery ==
The first indications of a submarine ridge off the coast of the Pacific Northwest was discovered by the USS Tuscarora, a United States Navy sloop under the command of George Belknap, in 1874. Surveying a route for an undersea cable between the United States and Japan, the USS Tuscarora discovered a submarine mountain range approximately 320 kilometres (200 mi) from Cape Flattery, which they did not consider a major discovery because throughout their voyage they found other locations with a larger profile, making the ridge seem insignificant in comparison.

== Geologic history ==
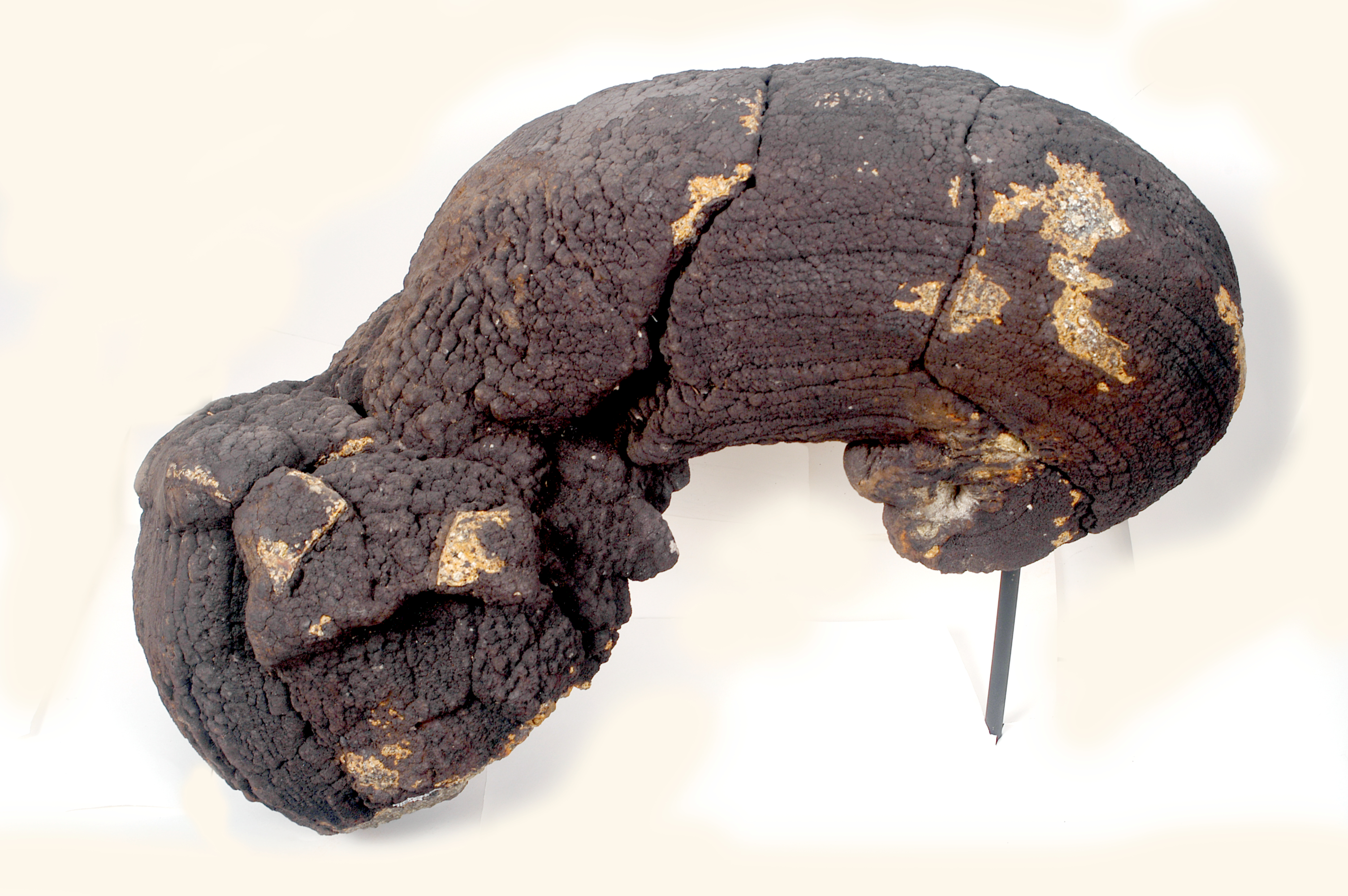
Basalt pillow lava from Juan de Fuca Ridge

The Juan de Fuca Ridge was at one point a part of the larger Pacific-Farallon ridge system. Approximately 30 million years ago, the Farallon Plate, being driven outwards by the Pacific-Farallon ridge, was pushed underneath the North American Plate, splitting what remained into the Juan de Fuca Plate to the North and the Cocos Plate and Nazca Plate to the South.

== Notable features ==
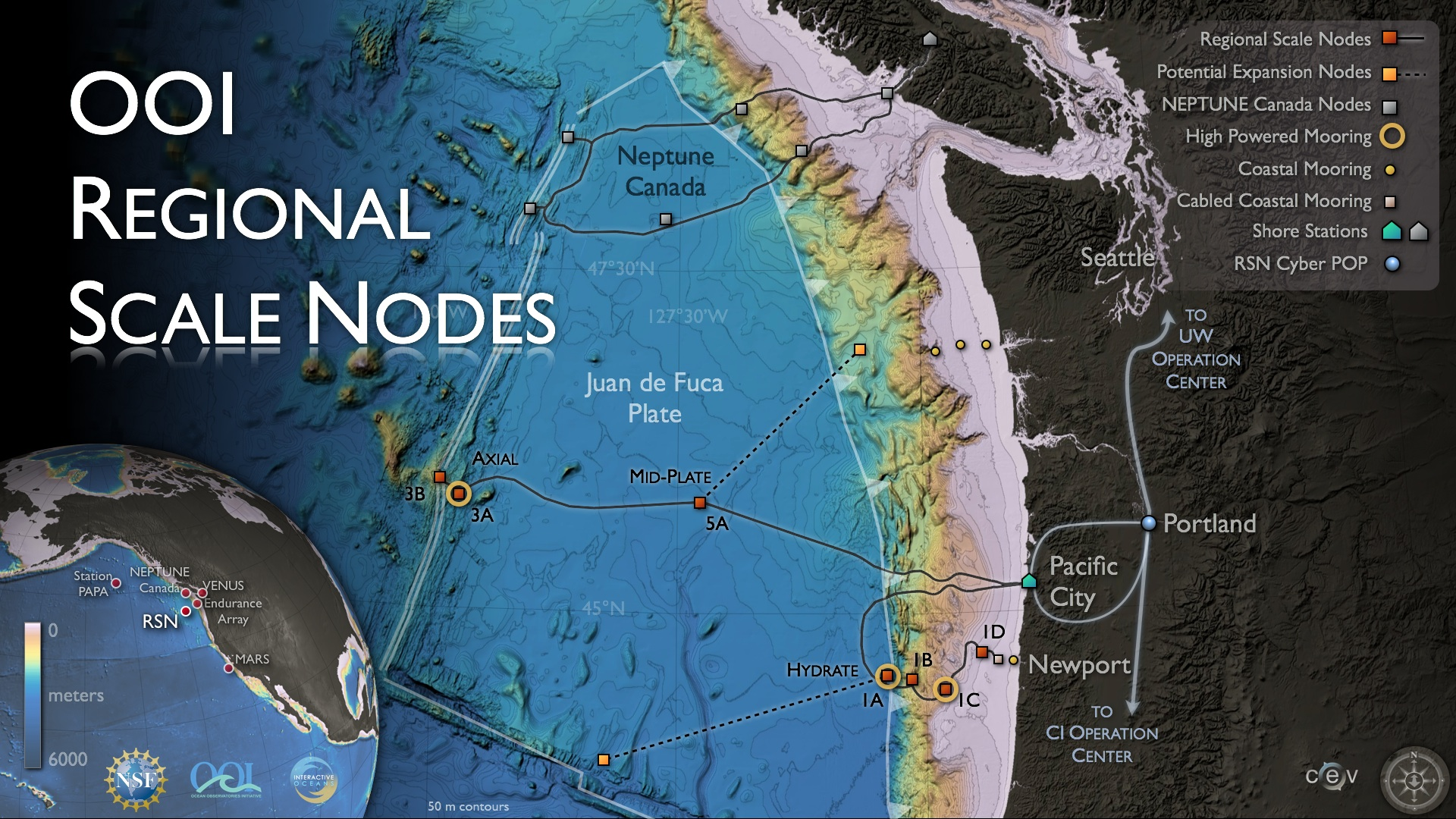
Node locations of the OOI cabled observatory network

Axial Seamount is a submarine volcano located on the ridge at a depth of 1,400 metres (4,600 ft) below sea level, rising 700 metres (2,300 ft) above the average ridge height. Axial is the most active volcano in the northeastern Pacific basin, and an underwater cabled observatory has been installed there as a part of the National Science Foundation's Ocean Observatories Initiative, making it one of the best studied volcanoes along mid-ocean ridges globally.

=== Endeavour segment ===
The Endeavour segment in the northern end of the ridge is another active and highly studied region. Sharp chemical and thermal contrasts, high levels of seismic activity, dense biological communities, and unique hydrothermal systems all make the segment a primary focus of research.

Some of the most intense and most active hydrothermal vents are located along the Endeavour segment, with more than 800 individual known chimneys within the ridge's central region, and a total of five major hydrothermal fields along the ridge. These chimneys release large amounts of sulphur-rich minerals into the water, which allow bacteria to oxidize organic compounds and metabolize anaerobically. This allows for a diverse ecosystem of organisms to exist in the low-oxygen conditions near the seafloor around the ridge.

== Eruptions and earthquakes ==
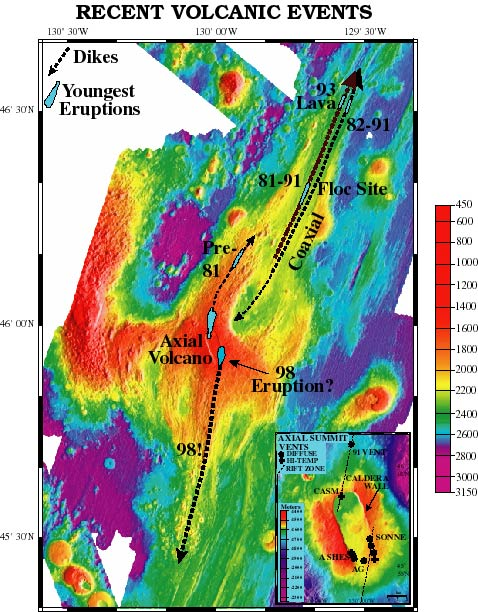
Bathymetric diagram of the Axial Seamount, showing the 1998 eruption and segmentation between the CoAxial, Axial, and Vance segments of the ridge

The first documented eruption on the Juan de Fuca Ridge took place on the Cleft segment in 1986 and 1987. Hydrothermal megaplumes indicated a large rifting event, releasing hydrothermal fluids as a result of lavas being extruded from a dike. A majority of the eruptions along the ridge are dike injection events, where molten rock is extruded between cracks in the crust's sheeted dike layer. Typically eruptive events can be predicted, as they are preceded by large earthquake swarms in the region.

A significant event took place in June 1993, lasting 24 days at the CoAxial segment. Cruises deployed as a result of the eruption sampled event plumes, cooling lava flows, and discovered microbial communities living on the seafloor around the ridge.

In February 1996, an event consisting of 4,093 earthquakes, lasting 34 days was recorded at the Axial Volcano, yielding similar scientific results to the 1993 eruption.

In January 1998 an event consisting of 8,247 earthquakes lasted 11 days at Axial Seamount. Lava was released from the caldera of the volcano, flowing down the southern side of the mountain, creating a sheet flow over 3 km long and 800m wide. This was the first time an underwater eruption had been monitored in-situ in real-time.

In June 1999, 1,863 earthquakes were recorded over 5 days, and a hydrothermal temperature increase was observed at the Main Endeavour segment.

In September 2001, 14,215 earthquakes were detected over a 25-day period in the Middle Valley segment.

Researchers at Oregon State University suggested the Axial Seamount had an eruption interval of approximately 16 years, which would place the next major Axial eruption in 2014. In 2011, during a dive on the seamount, new lava flows were discovered and some instruments had been buried in lava flows, indicating the volcano had erupted since the last expedition to the ridge. This is considered the first successful forecast of a seamount eruption. The caldera floor dropped by more than 2 meters after the eruption, and the rate at which it inflates as Axial's magma chamber refills can be used to once again predict the next eruption.

== Tectonic activity ==
The ridge is a medium rate spreading center, moving outwards at a rate of approximately 6 centimetres (2.4 in) per year. Tectonic activity along the ridge is monitored primarily with the U.S. Navy's Sound Surveillance System (SOSUS) array of hydrophones, allowing for real time detection of earthquakes and eruptive events.

The Juan de Fuca Plate is being pushed east underneath the North American Plate, forming what is known as the Cascadia subduction zone off the coast of the Pacific Northwest. The plate does not subduct smoothly and can become 'locked' with the North American plate. When this happens, strain builds up until the contact suddenly slips, triggering massive earthquakes up to or greater than magnitude 9. Major earthquakes along this zone occur on average every 550 years and can have major impacts on the physical structure of the North American continent and seafloor.

== See also ==
- Accretion (geology)
- Axial Seamount
- Cascadia Channel
- Explorer Ridge
- Forearc
- Geology of the Pacific Northwest
- Gorda Ridge
- Overlapping spreading centers
