= Geology of the Pacific Ocean =

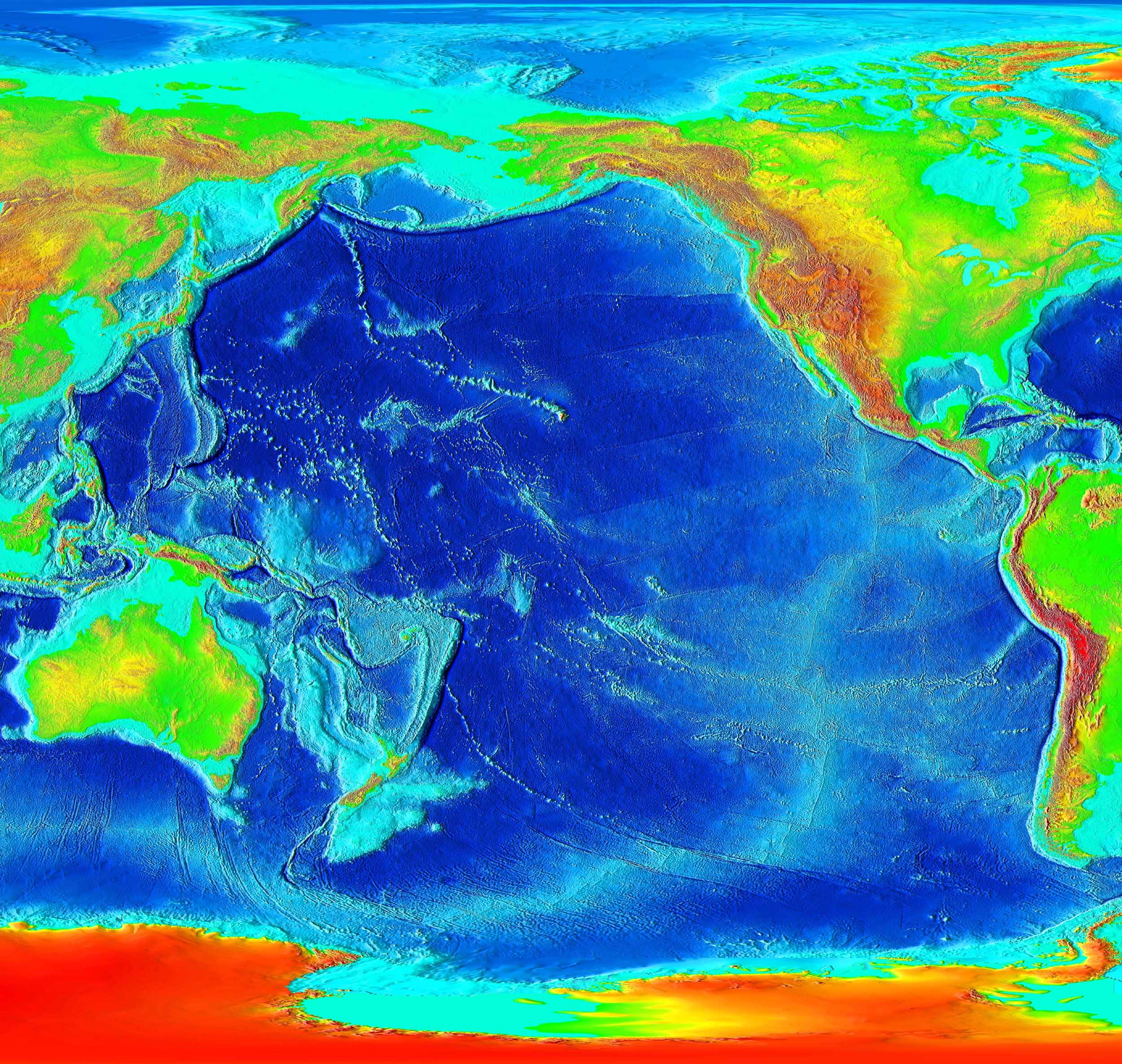
The Pacific is ringed by many volcanoes and oceanic trenches

The Pacific Ocean evolved in the Mesozoic from the Panthalassic Ocean, which had formed when Rodinia rifted apart around 750 Ma. The first ocean floor which is part of the current Pacific plate began 160 Ma to the west of the central Pacific and subsequently developed into the largest oceanic plate on Earth.

The East Pacific Rise near Easter Island is the fastest spreading mid-ocean ridge, with a spreading rate of over 15 cm/yr. The Pacific plate moves generally towards the northwest at between 7 and 11 cm/yr while the Juan De Fuca plate has an east-northeasterly movement of some 4 cm/yr.

Most subduction zones around the rim of the Pacific are directed away from a large area in the southern Pacific. At the core–mantle boundary below this area there is a large low-shear velocity province (LLSVP). Most of Pacific hotspots are located above the LLSVP while the longest Pacific hotspot tracks are located at or near its boundaries pointing at the positions of large igneous provinces.

Charles Darwin proposed a theory that explained the existence of reefs by means of slow subsidence of the ocean floor. His theories have been verified and expanded in the development of plate tectonics.

== History ==
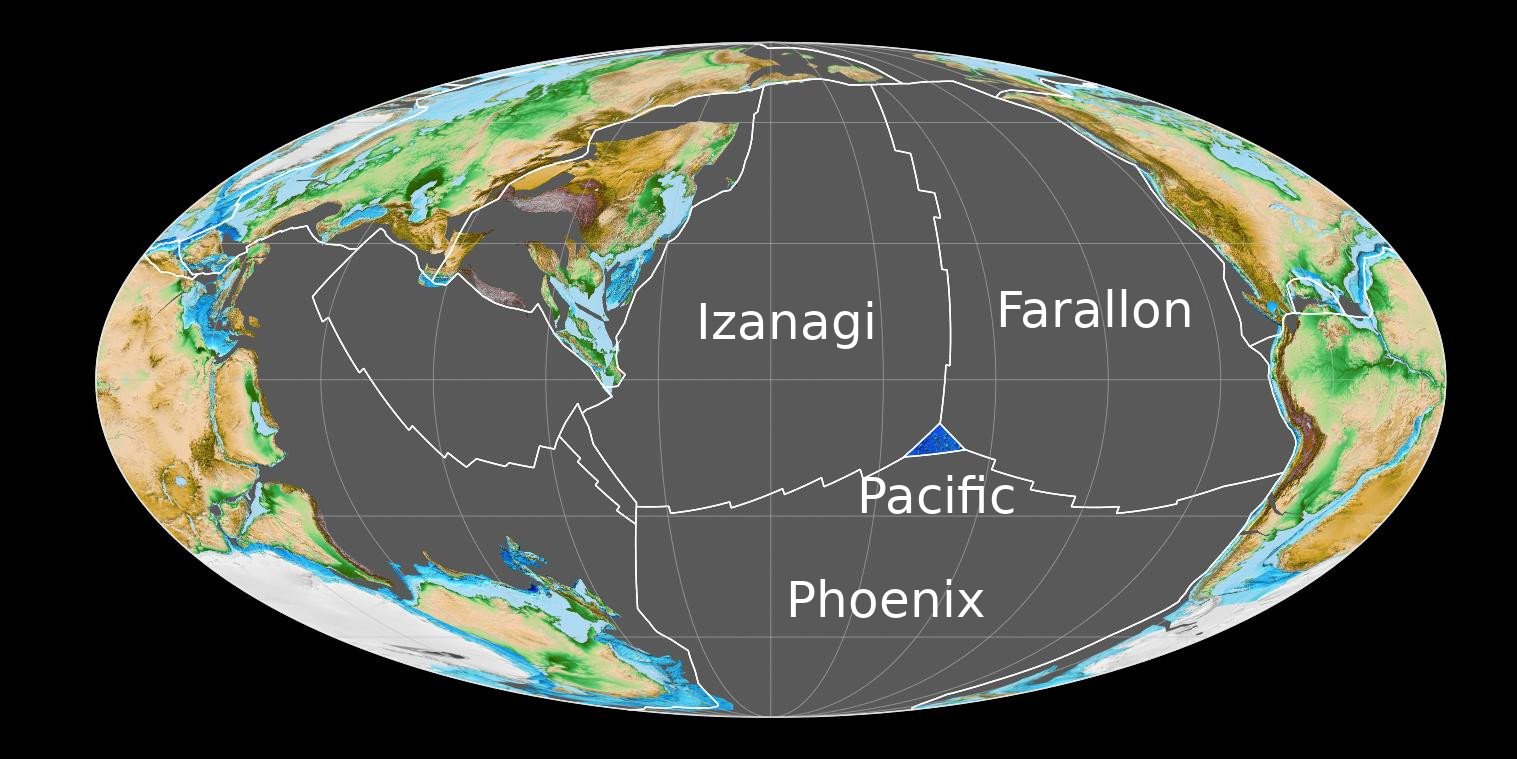
Birth of the Pacific plate 180 million years ago

In the Early Jurassic, the supercontinent Pangaea was surrounded by the superocean Panthalassa, the ocean floor of which was composed of the Izanagi, Farallon, and Phoenix plates. These three plates were joined at a migrating, or unstable, ridge-ridge-ridge (RRR) triple junction from which the Pacific plate began to grow 190 million years ago in an area east of the Mariana Trench; this area, known as the Pacific Triangle, is the oldest part of the Pacific plate and therefore the oldest ocean floor of the Pacific. Spreading laterally from this triangle are the Hawaiian, Japanese, and Phoenix magnetic lineations, the earliest traces of how the Pacific plate began to grow as a RRR triple junction fell apart into three triple junctions. Virtually all of the three Panthalassic plates have now been subducted beneath surrounding continents but their spreading rates have been preserved in the magnetic lineations around the Pacific Triangle.

In the North Pacific, magnetic anomalies south of the Aleutian Islands indicate the presence of a now almost completely subducted tectonic plate, known as the Kula plate, which probably existed from the Late Cretaceous to the Eocene (c. 83–40 Ma). This plate probably broke off the Farallon plate and, when subduction in the North Pacific shifted from Siberia to the Aleutian Trench c. 50 Ma, spreading ceased between the Kula plate and the Pacific plate.

The Pacific plate kept growing and lineations south of the Pacific Triangle indicate the Pacific–Phoenix ridge remained a simple N–S trending spreading system 156–120 Ma. Following the formation and break-up of the Ontong Java–Hikurangi–Manihiki large igneous province 120 Ma, however, the Phoenix plate broke into several smaller tectonic plates. The complexity of the Mid-Pacific and Magellan lineations indicate the presence of a series of microplates around the Pacific–Phoenix–Farallon triple junction.

The Farallon plate subducted under North America from the late Mesozoic, while spreading between the Pacific and Farallon plates was initiated 190 Ma and lasted until the break-up of the Farallon plate 23 Ma. During the Cenozoic the Farallon plate broke up along the eastern Pacific margin into the Kula, Vancouver/Juan de Fuca, and Cocos plates.

== Geological origins of the Pacific islands ==
The islands of the Pacific have developed in a number of ways. Some have originated as chains of volcanic islands on the tectonic plates either as a result of mantle plumes or by fracture propagation. Atolls have developed in tropical waters when, after volcanoes sink, coral growth results in reefs as evidenced by the Cook Islands. Coral reefs can develop into islands over a submerged extinct volcano following uplift as in Makatea and Rennell Island in the Solomon Archipelago which have steep coral cliffs over 100 metres high.

The Pacific plate emigrates northeast towards extensive subduction trenches. South of Japan, the Izu-Bonin and Mariana island arcs (IBM) formed in front of a clockwise rotating Philippine Sea plate. The IBM trenches began to grow in length c. 40 million years ago, opening back-arc basins in the Philippine Sea. Between 30 and 17 Mya, the old age of the subducting Pacific Ocean floor (110-130 Ma) resulted in a very fast trench migration and new back-arc basins opening behind the trenches.

The ocean floor of the Pacific Ocean is composed of nine oceanic tectonic plates, all located in the southeast where the East Pacific Rise separates the Pacific plate from the Antarctic, Juan Fernández, Nasca, Easter, Galápagos, Cocos, Rivera, Juan de Fuca plates. In the western and southwestern Pacific, continental blocks and back-arc basins form one of the most complex regions on earth stretching from Japan to New Zealand.

Plate movements have also caused fragments of continental crust to be rotated away from landmasses so as to form islands. Zealandia which broke off from Gondwana 70 million years ago with the spreading of the Tasman Sea, has since resulted in island protrusions such as New Zealand and New Caledonia. Related causes of island formation include obduction and subduction at convergent plate boundaries. Malaita and Ulawa in the Solomon Islands are the result of obduction while the effects of subduction can be seen in the formation of volcanic island arcs such as the Aleutian Arc off Alaska and the Kermadec-Tonga Subduction Zone north of New Zealand.

== Andesite line ==
Along the rim of the Pacific Basin are convergent plate boundaries often referred to as the andesite line since orogenic andesite is associated with this boundary. This line is often, but erroneously, confused with the boundaries of either the Pacific plate or the Pacific basin; the andesite line, however, also includes the Juan de Fuca, Cocos, and Nazca plates on its eastern boundary. This petrologic boundary separates the deeper mafic igneous rock of the Central Pacific Basin from the partially submerged continental areas of felsic igneous rock on its margins. Outside of the andesite line, volcanism is explosive; the Pacific Ring of Fire is the world's foremost belt of explosive volcanism. The Ring of Fire is named after the several hundred active volcanoes that sit above the various subduction zones.

In 2009, the deepest undersea eruption ever recorded occurred at the West Mata submarine volcano, a mile beneath the ocean, close to the Tonga-Kermadec Trench, within the Ring of Fire; it was filmed by the US Jason robotic submersible which descended over 1,100 metres (3,600 ft).

== Earthquakes ==
In March and April 2008, a series or swarm of moderate earthquakes occurred both near and within the Blanco fracture zone. The swarm began on 30 March when over 600 measurable tremors began occurring north of the zone within the Juan de Fuca plate. A decade earlier, in January 1998, another swarm was detected at Axial Seamount in the Juan de Fuca Ridge. At the time of its occurrence, scientists were not aware that the series of faults in this plate even existed. In a remote region of the central Pacific Ocean, at the southeastern section of the Gilbert Islands, a major swarm of intraplate earthquakes occurred between December 1981 and March 1983, with no prior seismicity having been reported in this region previously. Another swarm was detected on the Queen Charlotte Islands fracture zone in August–September 1967.

== Features ==
=== Guyots and seamounts ===
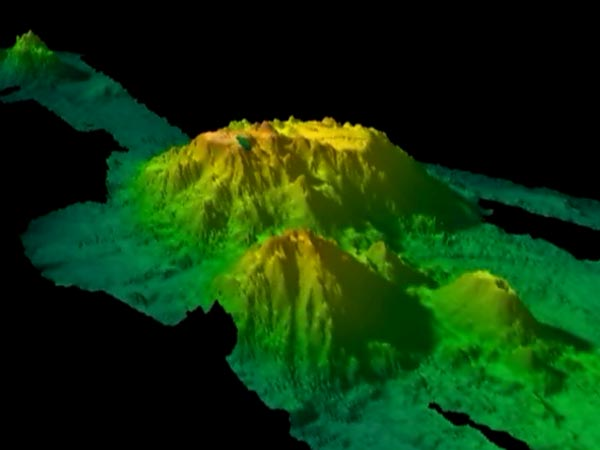
The Patton Seamount

- Alexa Bank
- Allison Guyot
- Cape Johnson Guyot
- Capricorn Seamount
- Crough Seamount
- Daiichi-Kashima Seamount
- Darwin Guyot
- Erimo Seamount
- Geologists Seamounts
- Horizon Guyot
- Marshall Islands
- MIT Guyot
- Patton Seamount
- Rano Rahi seamounts
- Resolution Guyot
- Takuyo-Daini
- Takuyo-Daisan

=== Seamount chains and hotspots ===
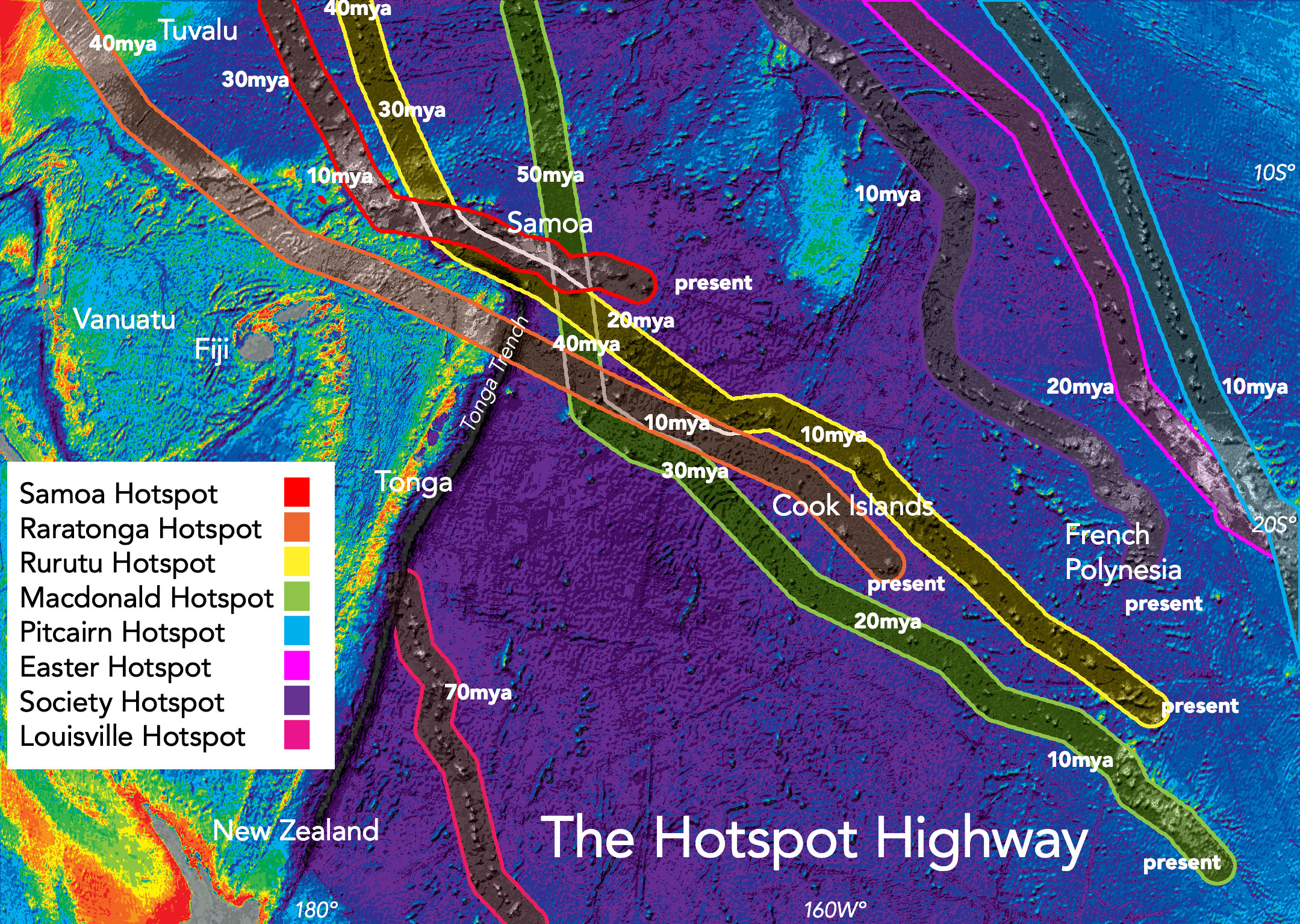
The Pacific also includes the Hotspot highway

The Pacific Ocean contains several long seamount chains, formed by hotspot volcanism. These include the Hawaiian–Emperor seamount chain, the Tasmantid Seamount Chain, the Lord Howe Seamount Chain and the Louisville Ridge.

- Arago hotspot
- Bowie hotspot
- Cobb hotspot
- Easter hotspot
- Galápagos hotspot
- Hawaii hotspot
- Juan Fernández hotspot
- Lamont seamount chain
- Louisville hotspot
- Macdonald hotspot
- Marquesas hotspot
- Ngatemato seamounts
- Pitcairn hotspot
- Rarotonga hotspot
- Samoa hotspot
- Tarava Seamounts
- Tasmantid hotspot
- Taukina seamounts
- Ujlān volcanic complex

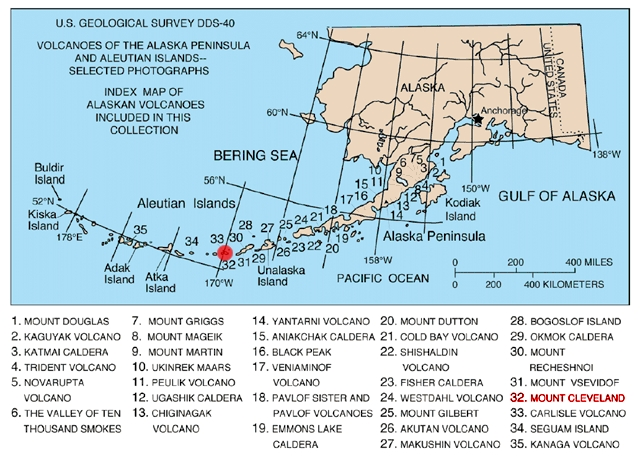
Volcanoes of the Aleutian Arc

=== Arcs and belts ===
- Aleutian Arc
- Andesite line
- Halmahera Arc
- Philippine Mobile Belt
- Philippine–Halmahera arc

=== Faults and fracture zones ===
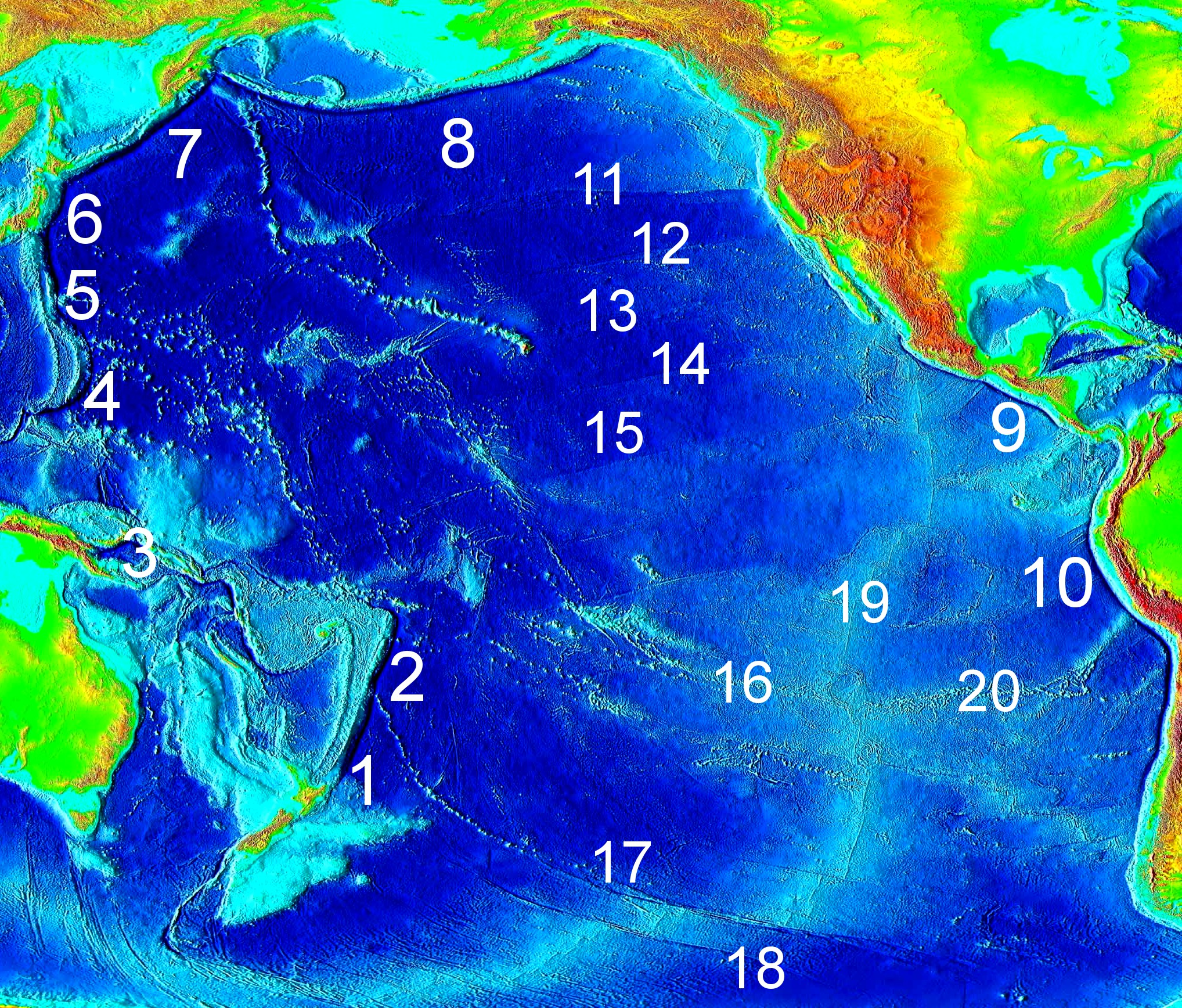
Pacific trenches: 1. Kermadec; 2. Tonga; 3. Bougainville; 4. Mariana; 5. Izu–Ogasawara; 6. Japan; 7. Kuril–Kamchatka; 8. Aleutian; 9. Middle America; 10. Peru–Chile; Fracture zones: 11. Mendocino; 12. Murray; 13. Molokai; 14. Clarion; 15. Clipperton; 16. Challenger; 17. Eltanin; 18. Udintsev; 19. East Pacific Rise (S-shaped); 20. Nazca Ridge

- Blanco fracture zone
- Clarton fracture zone
- Clipperton fracture zone
- Eltanin fault system
- Macquarie Fault Zone
- Mendocino fracture zone
- Murray fracture zone
- Molucca Sea Collision Zone
- Queen Charlotte Fault
- Sorong Fault

=== Underwater ridges and plateaus ===
- Carnegie Ridge
- Chile Rise
- Darwin Rise
- East Pacific Rise
- East Tasman Plateau
- Explorer Ridge
- Cocos–Nazca spreading centre
- Gorda Ridge
- Hollister Ridge
- Juan de Fuca Ridge
- Juan Fernández Ridge
- Kula–Farallon Ridge
- Lord Howe Rise
- Magellan Rise
- Mid-Pacific Mountains
- Nazca Ridge
- Norfolk Ridge
- Pacific–Antarctic Ridge
- Pacific–Farallon Ridge
- Pacific–Kula Ridge
- Phoenix Ridge
- Shatsky Rise
- Tehuantepec Ridge

=== Trenches and troughs ===
- Aleutian Trench
- Challenger Deep
- HMRG Deep
- Izu–Ogasawara Trench
- Japan Trench
- Kermadec Trench
- Kilinailau Trench
- Kuril–Kamchatka Trench
- Manus Trench
- Mariana Trench
- Mariana Trough
- Middle America Trench
- Nankai Trough
- Peru–Chile Trench
- Tonga Trench

=== Plates ===
Tectonic plates associated with Pacific Ocean

- Amurian plate
- Antarctic plate
- Balmoral Reef plate
- Banda Sea plate
- Bird's Head plate
- Caroline plate
- Cocos plate
- Conway Reef plate
- Easter plate
- Eurasian plate
- Futuna plate
- Galapagos Microplate
- Gorda plate
- Halmahera plate
- Indo-Australian plate
- Juan de Fuca plate
- Juan Fernández plate
- Kermadec plate
- Kula plate
- Manus plate
- Maoke plate
- Mariana plate
- Molucca Sea plate
- Nazca plate
- New Hebrides plate
- Niuafo'ou plate
- North American plate
- North Bismarck plate
- North Galapagos microplate
- Okhotsk microplate
- Okinawa plate
- Pacific plate
- Philippine Sea plate
- Rivera plate
- Sangihe plate
- Solomon Sea plate
- South Bismarck plate
- Sunda plate
- Timor plate
- Tonga plate
- Woodlark plate
- Yangtze plate

=== Triple junctions ===
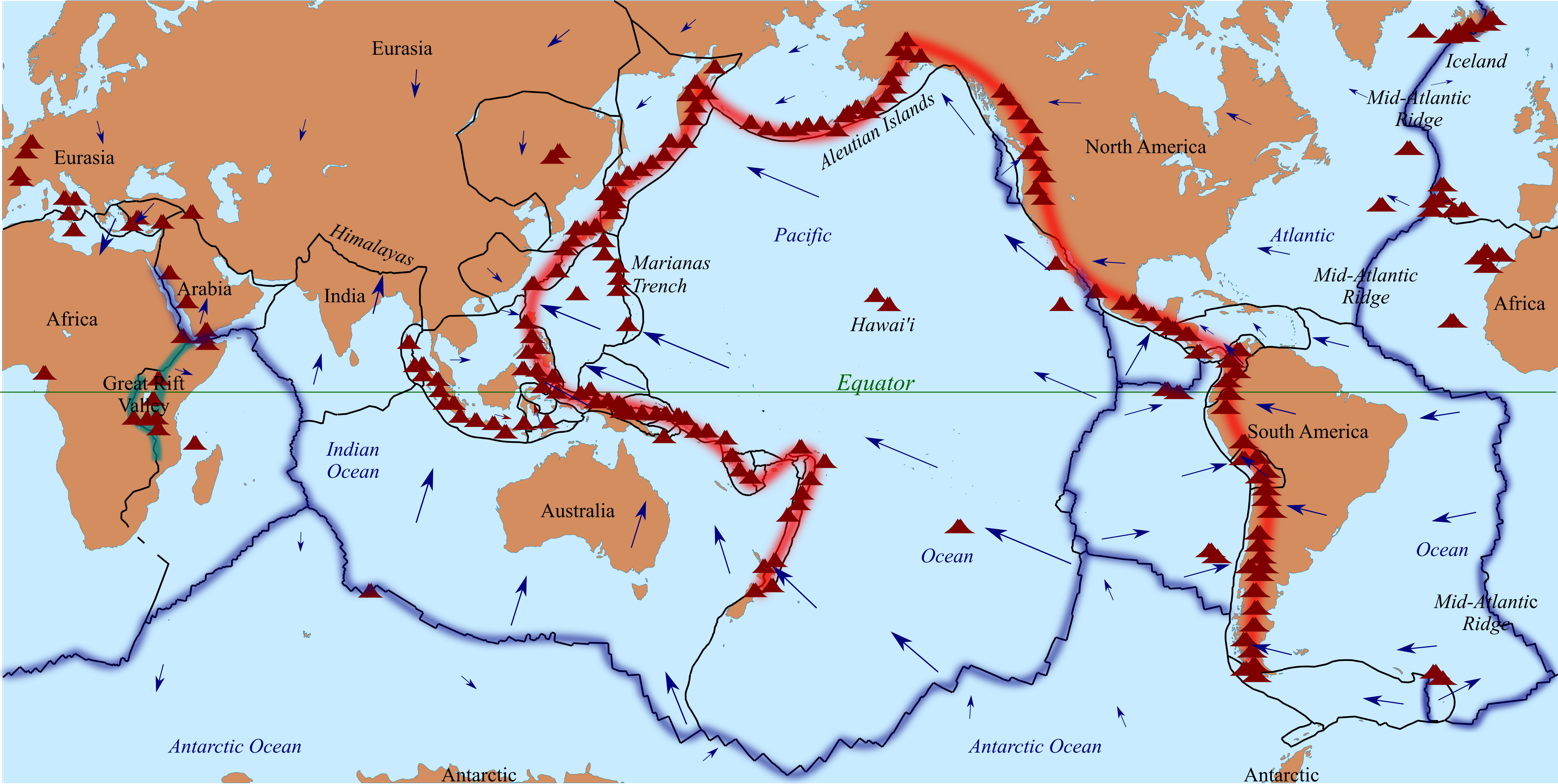
The Pacific Ring of Fire

- Boso triple junction
- Galápagos triple junction
- Mendocino triple junction

=== Volcanoes ===
- Alcedo Volcano
- Alofi Island
- Ball's Pyramid
- Bartolomé Island
- Clarion Island
- Daphne Major
- Eastern Gemini Seamount
- Futuna (Wallis and Futuna)
- Galápagos Islands
- Genovesa Island
- Hallasan
- Isabela Island (Galápagos)
- Isla Salas y Gómez
- Kilauea
- Lord Howe Island
- Maquinna
- Marchena Island
- Matthew and Hunter Islands
- Mauna Loa
- Mount Lidgbird
- Norfolk Island
- Nunivak Island
- Phillip Island (Norfolk Island)
- Pinta Island
- Poike
- Rábida Island
- Revillagigedo Islands
- Rocas Alijos
- San Benedicto Island
- Santiago Island (Galápagos)
- Sierra Negra (Galápagos)
- Socorro Island
- South Arch volcanic field
- Tamu Massif
- Volcán Wolf
