= Divergent double subduction =

Type of plate tectonic process

Schematic diagram showing subduction system in conventional plate tectonics theory and divergent double subduction

Divergent double subduction, also called outward dipping double-sided subduction, is a special type of subduction process in which two parallel subduction zones with different directions are developed on the same oceanic plate. In conventional plate tectonics theory, an oceanic plate subducts under another plate and new oceanic crust is generated somewhere else, commonly along the other side of the same plates However, in divergent double subduction, the oceanic plate subducts on two sides. This results in the closure of ocean and arc–arc collision.

This concept was first proposed and applied to the Lachlan Fold Belt in southern Australia. Since then, geologists have applied this model to other regions such as the Solonker Suture Zone of the Central Asian Orogenic Belt, the Jiangnan Orogen, the Lhasa–Qiangtang collision zone and the Baker terrane boundary. Active examples of this system are (1) the Molucca Sea Collision Zone in Indonesia, in which the Molucca Sea Plate subducts below the Eurasian Plate and the Philippine Sea Plate on two sides, and (2) the Adriatic Plate in the central Mediterranean, subducting both on its western side (beneath the Apennines and Calabria) and on its eastern side (beneath the Dinarides).

Note that the term divergent is used to describe one oceanic plate subducting in different directions on two opposite sides. This sense should not be confused with the use of the same term in divergent plate boundary, which refers to a spreading center, where two separate plates move away from each other.

== Evolution of divergent double subduction system ==
The complete evolution of a divergent double subduction system can be divided into four major stages.

Initial stage: The oceanic plate subducts on both side, forming two parallel arcs and accretionary wedges with opposing direction.

=== Initial stage ===
As the central oceanic plate subducts on both sides into the two overriding plates, the subducting oceanic slab brings fluids down and the fluids are released in the mantle wedge. This initiates the partial melting of the mantle wedge and the magma eventually rise into the overriding plates, resulting in the formation of two volcanic arcs on the two overriding plates. At the same time, sediment deposits on the two margins of the overriding plates, forming two accretionary wedges. As the plate subducts and rollback occurs, the ocean becomes narrower and the subduction rate reduces as the oceanic plate becomes closer to an inverted "U" shape.

Second stage: Closure of ocean basin and the soft collision of two overriding plates

=== Second stage ===
The ocean is closed eventually as subduction continues. The two overriding plates meet, collide, and weld together by a "soft" collision. The inverted "U" shape of the oceanic plate inhibits the continued subduction of the plate because the mantle material below the plate is trapped.

Third stage: Detachment of oceanic plate resulting in partial melting of mantle and lower crust

=== Third stage ===
The dense oceanic plate has a high tendency to sink. As it sinks, it breaks along the oceanic plate and the welded crust above and a gap is created. The extra space created leads to the decompression melting of mantle wedge materials. The melts flow upward and fill the gap and intrude the oceanic plate and welded crust as mafic dykes intrusion. Eventually, the oceanic plate completely breaks apart from the welded crust as it continues to sink.

Final stage: Continued sinking of the oceanic crust. Partial melting of mantle and lower crust continue to drive intrusion and volcanism. The volcanic and sedimentary rocks deposit unconformably on the accretionary complex. Dashed lines with arrow show poloidal mantle flow induced by slab rollback.

=== Final stage ===
When the oceanic plate breaks apart from the crust and sinks into the mantle, underplating continues to occur. At the same time, the sinking oceanic plate starts to dewater and release the fluids upward to aid the partial melting of mantle and the crust above. It results in extensive magmatism and bimodal volcanism.

== Magmatic and metamorphic features ==
=== Arc magmatism ===
Unlike one sided subduction where only one magmatic arc is generated on the overriding plate, two parallel magmatic arcs are generated on both colliding overriding plates when the oceanic plate subducts on two sides. Volcanic rocks indicating arc volcanism can be found on both sides of the suture zone. Typical rock types include calc-alkaline basalt, andesites, dacite and tuff. These arc volcanic rocks are enriched in large ion lithophile element (LILE) and light rare earth element (LREE) but depleted in niobium, hafnium and titanium.

=== Extensive intrusions ===
Partial melting of mantle generates mafic dyke intrusion. Because the mantle is the primary source, these dykes record isotopic characteristics of the depleted mantle in which the ^{87}Sr/^{86}Sr ratio is near 0.703 and samarium-neodymium dating is positive. On the other hand, partial melting of the lower crust (accretionary complex) leads to S-type granitoid intrusions with enriched aluminium oxide throughout the evolution of divergent double subduction.

=== Bimodal volcanism ===
When the oceanic plate detaches from the overlying crust, intense decompressional melting of mantle is induced. Large amount of hot basaltic magma intrude and melt the crust which generate rhyolitic melt. This results in alternating eruption of basaltic and rhyolitic lava.

=== Low grade metamorphism ===
Without continental collision and deep subduction, high grade metamorphism is not common like other subduction zones. Most of the sedimentary strata and volcanics in the accretionary wedge experience low to medium grade metamorphism up to greenschist or amphibolite facies only.

== Structural features ==
Schematic cross section showing modern example of divergent double subduction system in Molucca Sea Collision Zone, Indonesia. The Sangihe arc is overriding the Halmahera Arc and accretionary complex is formed on forearc of Halmahera Arc

=== Thrusting and folding ===
When the two overriding plates converge, two accretionary wedges will develop. The two accretionary wedges are in opposite direction. Thus, direction of thrust and vergence of the folds in the accretionary wedges are opposite also. However, this proposed feature may not be observed because of the continuous deformation. For example, in the modern day example of Molucca Sea Collision Zone, the continuous active collision causes the Sangihe Arc to override the Halmahera Arc and the back arc of Halmahera Arc to overthrust itself. In this case, complex fold thrust belt including the accretionary complex is formed. In the future, the Sangihe Arc will override the Halmahera Arc and the rock records in Halmahera will disappear.

=== Unconformity ===
When the two overriding plates collide and the ocean basin is closed, sedimentation ceases. Sinking of the oceanic plate drag down the welded crust to form a basin that allows continued sedimentation. After the oceanic plate completely detaches from the crust above, isostatic rebound occurs, leaving a significant unconformity in the sedimentary sections.

== Factors controlling the evolution of divergent double subduction system ==
In nature, the inverted "U" shape of the oceanic plate in divergent double subduction should not be always perfectly symmetrical like the idealized model. An asymmetrical form is preferred like the real example in Molucca Sea where the length of the subducted slab is longer on its western side beneath the Sangihe Arc while a shorter slab on its eastern side beneath the Halmahera Arc. 3D numerical modelling had been done to simulate divergent double subduction, to evaluate different factors that can affect the evolution and geometry of the system discerned below.

=== Width of the oceanic plate ===
Toroidal flow of slab trapped mantle at the edge of the oceanic plate

The width of the plate determines whether the divergent double subduction can be sustained. The inverted "U" shape of the oceanic plate is not an effective geometry for it to sink because of the mantle materials beneath. Those mantle materials need to escape by toroidal flow at the edge of the subducted oceanic plate. With a narrow oceanic plate (width < 2000 km), the trapped mantle beneath the oceanic plate can effectively escape by toroidal flow. In contrast, for a persistent oceanic plate (width > 2000 km), the trapped mantle beneath the oceanic plate cannot escape effectively by toroidal flow and the system cannot be sustained. Therefore, divergent double subduction can only occur in small narrow oceanic plate but not in large width oceanic plate. This also explains why it is rare in nature and most subduction zones are single sided.

=== Order of subduction ===
Order of subduction controls the geometry of divergent doubled subduction. The side that begins to subduct earlier enters the eclogitization level earlier. The density contrast between the plate and the mantle increases which makes the sinking of the plate faster, creating a positive feedback. It results in an asymmetrical geometry where the slab length is longer on the side which subducts earlier. The slab pull, amount of poloidal flow and the rate of convergence on the side with shorter length will be reduced.

It remains unclear how initiation occurs for both sides of a single plate if subduction is in form of divergent double subduction, even though this subduction type has been clearly observed . This is because it's difficult to break a moving oceanic plate (i.e., acting as a trailing edge, which moving in the reverse direction of the ongoing, earlier-initiated subduction) due to lack of compression required for forced (induced) subduction initiation. Therefore, self-consistent initiation of divergent double subduction, together with other forms of double subduction, requires further studies of structural and magmatic records.

=== State of motion of the overriding plates ===
The state of motion of overriding plates controls the geometry of divergent doubled subduction and the position of collision. The length of the subducting slab beneath a stagnant overriding plate is shorter because the mantle flow is weaker and the subduction is slower. In contrast, the length of the subducting slab beneath a free moving plate is longer. Additionally, the position of collision is shifted more to the side with stagnant plate as the rollback is faster on the free moving side.

=== Thickness of the overriding plates ===
Thickness of the overriding plates has a similar effect as state of motion of overriding plates to control the geometry of divergent doubled subduction and the position of collision. A thicker overriding plate hinders subduction because of the larger friction. It results in a shorter slab. Vice versa, a thinner overriding plate have a longer slab.

=== Density contrast between oceanic plate and mantle ===
Larger density contrast between oceanic plate and mantle creates a larger negative buoyancy of the oceanic plate. It results in a faster subduction and a stronger rollback. Therefore, the mantle flow induced by the rollback (poloidal flow) is also enhanced. The convergence rate is increased, resulting in a faster and more vigorous collision between the two overriding plates.
