= Daiichi-Kashima Seamount =

Seamount in the Pacific Ocean

Daiichi-Kashima
- Location within Oceania

Location
- Location: Western Pacific Ocean
- Coordinates: 34.2°N 144.3°E
- Country: Japan

Daiichi-Kashima Seamount is a guyot in the Pacific Ocean off Japan. It is about 3.5 kilometres (2.2 mi) high and reaches a depth of 3,540 metres (11,610 ft). Daiichi-Kashima formed during the Barremian as a result of volcanic activity; during the Albian reefs formed on the seamount and generated a limestone cap. The seamount later.

The seamount has been approaching the Japan Trench and a noticeable vertical offset of about 1.5 kilometres (0.93 mi) between the eastern and western halves of Daiichi-Kashima appears to be the result of normal faulting as the seamount enters the trench, with the western half dropping down; it may also reflect a past sector collapse when the volcano was still active.

== Geography and geology ==
=== Regional ===
The Daiichi-Kashima seamount lies 150 kilometres (93 mi) east of Cape Inubō and Chōshi off the eastern coast of Honshu, Japan. Other seamounts in the area are Katori Seamount northeast of Daiichi-Kashima and Daini-Kashima Seamount east of Katori Seamount and the Kashima fracture zone ends southeast of the seamount.

=== Local ===
Daiichi-Kashima is a 3.5 kilometres (2.2 mi) high and 50 kilometres (31 mi) wide guyot and rises to a depth of 3,540 metres (11,610 ft). On the eastern part of the volcano lies an at least 0.6 kilometres (0.37 mi) thick platform of clay and reef limestone with traces of past barrier reefs at its margins. The summit platform of Daiichi-Kashima covers an area of 83 square kilometres (32 sq mi).

It is cut by several normal faults that run approximately parallel to the trench and have an offset of about 1.5 kilometres (0.93 mi) in the central sector of the volcano; the carbonate platform is also offset in such a manner by a normal fault represented by a scarp into a lower western and a higher eastern part. This fault, which appears to be split in two or three subsidiary faults separated by grabens, extends past the Daiichi-Kashima seamount and covers a length of 100 kilometres (62 mi); evidently Daiichi-Kashima has been split in half by the fault, which is much younger than the ocean floor and moved at a rate of 1.2 centimetres per year (0.47 in/year) but does not appear to be presently active in light of the sediment cover on the scarp. Aside from a normal motion, the western half of the seamount has also been moved away from the eastern half and is tilted west.

The seamount appears to be part of a seamount chain called Joban Seamount Chain or Kashima-Ryofu No.1 that formed during the Cretaceous in the Equatorial Pacific and about 30° south of their present-day position. Evidence indicates that the seamount chain was not formed by a hotspot. The seafloor around Daiichi-Kashima is covered by marine sediments.

=== Relation to the Japan Trench ===
Daiichi-Kashima lies south of the Japan Trench on a seafloor of Valanginian age, very close to the trench. The Pacific plate is subducting beneath Japan at a rate of 9 centimetres per year (3.5 in/year) and close to the Daiichi-Kashima Seamount lies the Boso triple junction between the Japan Trench, the Sagami Trench and the Izu–Bonin Trench. The subduction process may cause the downgoing oceanic plate to buckle and form normal faults that run parallel to the trench.

Since about 100,000 years, the western half of Daiichi-Kashima is being subducted in the Japan Trench and about one third to one quarter of the seamount has been subducted already. Part of the landward margin of the trench close to Daiichi-Kashima is uplifted, perhaps as a consequence of the subduction of the seamount, and there is periodic earthquake activity in front of Daiichi-Kashima seamount with magnitude 7 earthquakes about every 20 years. The seamount might also influence the segmentation of the trench and its earthquakes, considering that the rupture of the 2011 Tohoku earthquake spanned the trench length between Erimo Seamount and Daiichi-Kashima and did not propagate past the latter. The other seamounts in the area will likely be subducted after Daiichi-Kashima has been, and there is evidence of older seamounts being accreted to Japan, like the Akiyoshi seamount.

=== Composition ===
Volcanic rocks from Daiichi-Kashima include basanite, benmoreite and mugearite. There is a distinction between the eastern and western sectors of the volcano, with the western one consisting mainly of mugearite. Phenocrysts identified in sampled rocks include aegirine–augite, alkali feldspar, amphibole, chromium spinel, clinopyroxene, magnetite, olivine and plagioclase.

Dredging has found limestones on Daiichi-Kashima which have been subdivided into an upper and a lower formation. The limestones form a cap over the top of the seamount and its downfaulted portion, with thicknesses of 200–400 metres (660–1,310 ft), and show evidence of a structure resembling that expected from atoll limestone. Especially on its western part ferromanganese crusts and phosphorites have been encountered as well. Other rocks are rudistid-coral floatstones, oolithic grainstones and peloidal wackestones containing algal pisolites and other algal remnants. Other fossils include bivalves, corals, echinoids, foraminifers and stromatoporoidea. The rudist Praecaprotina kashimae is named after the seamount.

== Geological history ==
The volcano is of Barremian age, the limestones are of Aptian to Albian age. Magnetic traits in the seamount suggest that it formed 140–120 million years ago close to a spreading center, which is older than the age of 100 million years inferred from fossils but comparable to ages inferred from radiometric dating. Radiometric dating has yielded ages of 120.4 ± 2.7 million years ago for the eastern and of 117.8 ± 8.4 million years ago for the western side of the seamount. The seamount is thus considered to be 120–100 million years old, while the underlying crust is about 20 million years older. At the time of its formation, Daiichi-Kashima was located between 7.6° northern and 1° southern latitude, with one proposed coordinate being 1°S 165°W. The landscape and structure of the former atoll that became the present-day Iberg Dripstone Cave in Germany has been compared to Daiichi-Kashima.

Based on isotope ratios it was once inferred that Daiichi-Kashima consists of two separate volcanoes but a later theory indicates that these are two separate stages of the same volcano. One proposal envisages that volcanism took place in two separate stages, between which the western flank of the volcano underwent a large-scale collapse. In the first stage, basalts formed a volcanic island that eventually erupted trachytes. In a second stage, the western flank of the volcano collapsed and subsequently chemically different lavas and pyroclastics were emplaced, covering the bulk of the volcano and giving it a paired appearance similar to Reunion.

During the Albian erosion and subsidence levelled the volcano, forming a flat surface. A carbonate platform developed on this surface first with fringing reefs and then with barrier reefs. The carbonate platform continued to be active for 10 million years. A research group of the Tokai University after studying dredged samples proposed that the limestones west and east of the central scarp are of different ages and developed at different sea levels: The western part would be of Barremian age and the eastern one of Albian age. This would explain why they lie at distinct depths.

After its drowning, Daiichi-Kashima continued to subside until it arrived at the Japan Trench between 250,000 and 150,000 years ago. Beginning about 1 million years ago, the buckling of the ocean crust as it approached the trench induced faulting across Daiichi-Kashima and eventually another collapse of the western flank took place. Hydrocarbon seeps have been found at Daiichi-Kashima.

== Biology ==
Over a hundred animal species have been identified at Daiichi-Kashima, including large clams and squat lobsters.The sea star Ampheraster phantasma and polychaete worm species Melinnopsis shinkaiae were discovered at Daiichi-Kashima; the polychaete forms sparse "woodlands" of worm tubes protruding from the seafloor. The seamount is within the Izu-Ogasawara Trench Offshore Seabed Nature Conservation Area, a submarine protected area established in 2020 by the Japanese government.
