= Three Wise Men (volcanoes) =

Row of three underwater volcanoes on the East Pacific Rise

- Height: 1,000 m (3,281 ft)-2,000 m (6,562 ft)

Location
- Location: East Pacific Rise, Pacific Ocean

Geology
- Type: Seamounts (underwater volcanoes)

The Three Wise Men are a row of three seamounts (underwater volcanoes) located in the Pacific Ocean, on the East Pacific Rise. They are part of a large group of seamounts, collectively known as the Rano Rahi. They stand at between 1,000 m (3,281 ft) and 2,000 m (6,562 ft), and are named after the Biblical Magi or the "three wise men". The middle of the three is the tallest and also the flattest at its top. The southern one is similar to its larger neighbor, but slightly shorter. The northern one is the middle of the two, with a large caldera and a circular shape.
