= Hotspot =

Hotspot, Hot Spot or Hot spot may refer to:

== Places ==
- Hot Spot, Kentucky, a community in the United States

== Arts, entertainment, and media ==
=== Fictional entities ===
- Isaiah Crockett, DC Comics character also known as Hot Spot
- Hot Spot (Transformers), any of several characters

=== Films ===
- Hot Spot (1941 film), later retitled I Wake Up Screaming
- Hot Spot (1945 film), a Private Snafu film
- The Hot Spot, a 1990 neo-noir film
- Hot Spot (2024 film), an Indian Tamil-language anthology film
- Hot Spot (2026 film), a science fiction thriller film

=== Other uses in arts, entertainment, and media ===
- Hot Spot (board game), a 1979 board game published by Metagaming Concepts
- "Hot Spot" (Burn Notice), a television episode
- The Hot Spot (TV series), a Japanese comedy drama series
- Hot Spot (musical), 1963
- "Hot Spot" (song), by Foxy Brown
- Hotspot (album), a 2020 album by Pet Shop Boys
- BattleTech: Hot Spots, a 1993 collection of scenarios for BattleTech

== Computing ==
- Hot spot (computer programming), a computer-intensive region of a program
- Wi-Fi hotspot, a wireless network access point or area
  - Connectify Hotspot, a software application for creating a wireless access point
  - Mobile hotspot, also known as Tethering, sharing of a mobile device's Internet connection
- HotSpot, the Java Virtual Machine originally developed by Sun and the current reference implementation of the Java programming language
- Screen hotspot, an area enabled for user interactivity on a display

== Science and healthcare ==
- Hotspot (geology), an area of unusually high volcanic activity
- Hot spot (veterinary medicine), an irritated skin lesion
- Hot spot, a location with a high level of radioactive contamination
- Biodiversity hotspot, a region of significant variety and variability of life
- Hot spot effect in subatomic physics, regions of high energy density or temperature
- Recombination hotspot, a region in a genome with a high rate of recombination
- A risky place on an airport, depicted on airport diagrams

== Other uses ==
- Hot spot (casting), a metal casting defect
- Hot Spot (cricket), an infrared tracking system
- Airport hot spots, locations where aircraft collisions with ground equipment may occur
- Hotspot camp, a refugee camp that serves as an initial reception point
- Pyotraumatic dermatitis (also known as hot spots), a common skin infection for dogs
