= Mariana plate =

Small tectonic plate west of the Mariana Trench

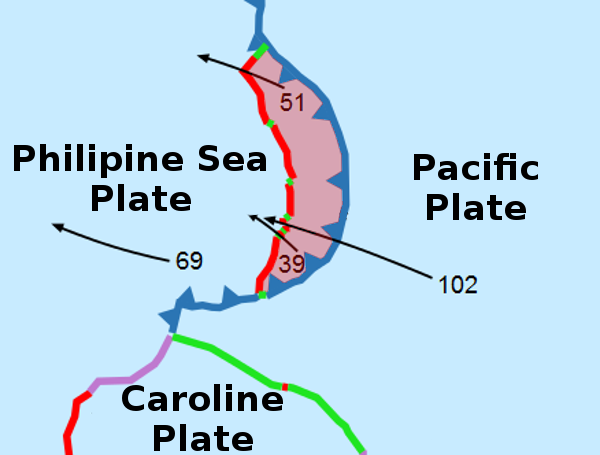
- Type: Minor
- Approximate area: 360,000 km^{2} (140,000 sq mi)^{2}
- Movement^{1}: north-west
- Speed^{1}: 39-51mm/year
- Features: Mariana Islands, Mariana Trench
- ^{1}Relative to the African plate

Cross section across the Mariana plate

The Mariana plate is a micro tectonic plate located west of the Mariana Trench which forms the basement of the Mariana Islands which form part of the Izu–Bonin–Mariana Arc. It is separated from the Philippine Sea plate to the west by a divergent boundary with numerous transform fault offsets. The boundary between the Mariana and the Pacific plate to the east is a subduction zone with the Pacific plate subducting beneath the Mariana. This eastern subduction is divided into the Mariana Trench, which forms the southeastern boundary, and the Izu–Ogasawara Trench the northeastern boundary. The subduction plate motion is responsible for the shape of the Mariana plate and back arc.

== Geological history ==
Subduction at the Mariana plate has been going on for over 50 million years. Some theories of the origin of this microplate is that when the Pacific plate began to subduct beneath the Philippine plate the volcanism and spreading ridge started to make an arc. This geological activity caused the section of the Philippine plate to break off and become the Mariana microplate. The Mariana Islands consist of volcanoes that are active and dormant and are made up of volcanic and sedimentary rocks from the Pleistocene.

== Defining features ==
As the Pacific plate subducts beneath the Mariana plate, it creates a trench. This is the Mariana Trench, and it is the deepest trench in the world. Another result of this subduction is the Mariana Islands. These are formed from dehydration of the subducting, old oceanic crust creates melt, and the melt rises to the surface through a volcano. This volcanism has been occurring for almost 50 million years. The rock type in the area is volcaniclastic sediments on top of igneous rocks. The source of these rocks are from crustal spreading.

Just off the eastern coast of Mariana there are big seamounts made of serpentinized periodic. They are formed from mud volcanism. The composition for the seamounts differs in the Izu–Ogasawara Trench and Mariana systems which indicate regional changes in geology.

== Tectonic behavior ==
=== Eastern convergent boundary ===
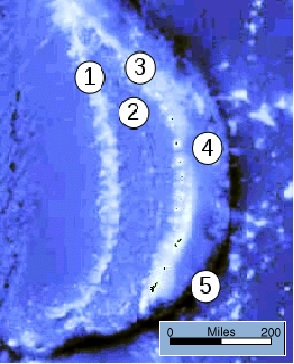
Mariana plate boundary. 1 is West Mariana Ridge, 2 is Mariana Trough, 3 is Mariana Arc, 4 is Mariana Fore-Arc, 5 is Mariana Trench

The tectonic plate is approximately 100 km thick and converging to the east at a rate of 50–80 mm/yr with the Pacific plate subducting at 60–100 mm/yr This eastern subduction is divided into the Mariana Trench, which forms the southeastern boundary, and the Izu–Ogasawara Trench the northeastern boundary. The Izu–Ogasawara Trench and Mariana subduction zones are traveling at different rates. While the northern section of the Izu–Ogasawara Trench plate is subducting at 44 mm/yr, the southern section subducts at 14 mm/yr. The subducting Pacific plate dips at about 10 degrees and directed 83 degrees west of north. The northern subduction zone is expanding by rifting while the southern contains a strike slip fault. Seismologists have been studying how the subducting slabs underneath the Mariana island arc are entering the lower mantle and being redirected horizontally, deflecting off the upper to lower mantle transition zone.

=== Western divergent boundary ===
The Mariana plate is also separating at a rate of 30 mm/yr from the Philippine Plate to the west. The Mariana Trough is located on the western side of the island arc along with the back arc basin. Around 3 Ma the basin began spreading at 4.7 cm/yr. Due to the back arc spreading in the Mariana Trough the islands are moving east while the Philippine Sea plate is staying almost stationary.

== Future of plate ==
Since there is volcanism happening on the Mariana back arc ridge and basin, this system could continue to grow but combining the rate of separation from the Philippine plate along with the subduction destroying the Mariana plate it is possible this microplate could eventually dissipate. The rate of subduction is greater than the rate of uplift. The collision of aseismic ridges and the axis of the trench explain how the plate curvature is evolving.
