= Halmahera Arc =

Volcanic arc of the Halmahera region of eastern Indonesia

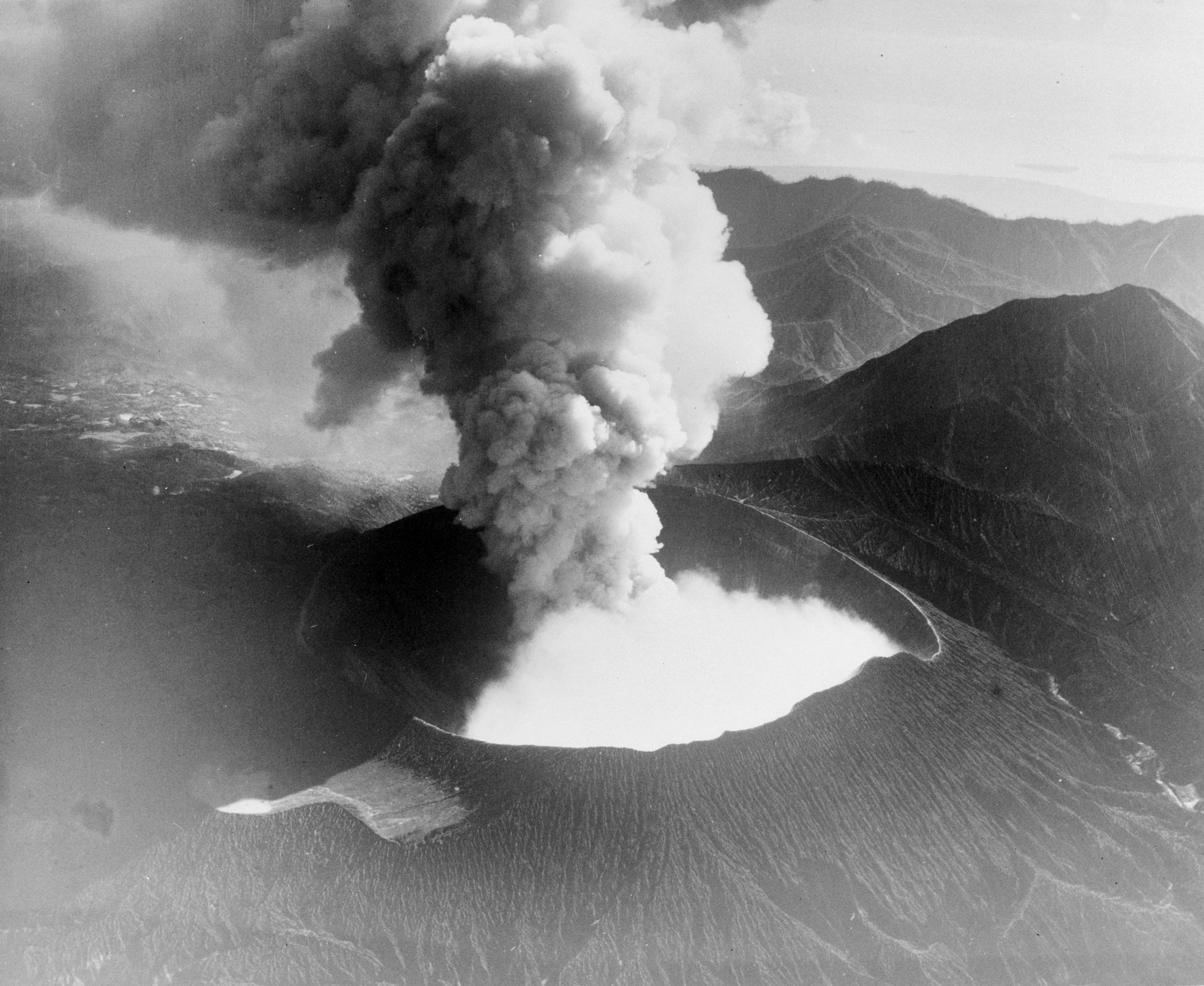
Volcanic eruption at Halmahera Arc in 1946

Halmahera Arc is the volcanic arc of the Halmahera region of eastern Indonesia. It is considered to belong to the Halmahera plate within the Molucca Sea Collision Zone.

== Origin ==
Potassium-argon ages of Neogene to Recent igneous rocks from the Halmahera region record a history of intra-oceanic arc development since the late Middle Miocene following an earlier phase of collisional plutonism. Arc formation from the Middle Miocene onwards was due to the east-directed subduction of the Molucca Sea plate beneath the Philippine Sea plate as it arrived at the Eurasian margin. The distribution of ages within the Neogene arc indicates a northward migration of volcanic activity during the Late Miocene to Pliocene. Results of the dating work show that after collision with the Australian margin at c. 22 Ma there was a period of volcanic quiescence and limestone deposition before a new arc formed. This arc began erupting at around 11 Ma on Obi as a result of subduction of the Molucca Sea plate. Initiation of subduction is thought to have occurred around 15–17 Ma and may have been responsible for disturbing potassium-argon ages of pre-Neogene rocks. Dates from fresh rocks show that the volcanic front migrated northwards through Bacan and Halmahera throughout the Late Miocene to Early Pliocene. Limestone deposition was curtailed as arc activity migrated north while volcanism died out from the south. No Neogene volcanism younger than 8 Ma is observed in the Obi area while on Bacan subduction-related volcanism ceased at c. 2 Ma.

Late Pliocene crustal deformation caused a 30–40 km westward shift of the volcanic front. Quaternary volcanic rocks exposed in Bacan and the extreme south of Halmahera are not direct products of subduction but, rather, display geochemical characteristics of both subduction and fault-related magmatism. These volcanic rocks are distributed along splays of the Sorong Fault system. The formation and propagation of the Halmahera arc is a consequence of the clockwise rotation of the Philippine Sea plate as the southern edge moved across the northern Australian margin and impinged on the east Eurasian margin. The ages of initiation of volcanism and subduction track the developing plate boundary as subduction propagated northwards.

== See also ==
- Australian plate
- Halmahera plate
- Molucca Sea plate
- Philippine Mobile Belt
- Sangihe plate
