= BattleTech: Hot Spots =

Book of BattleTech scenarios

BattleTech: Hot Spots is a collection of scenarios published by FASA in 1993 for the science fiction mecha wargame BattleTech.

== Contents ==
BattleTech: Hot Spots is designed to work with FASA's simultaneously published BattleTech: Mercenaries book, which set out the rules for role-playing a mercenary in the BattleTech universe. Hot Spots provides missions for the mercenaries. It contains two books:

- The first is for the gamemaster, and provides 64 missions that can vary from garrison duty to planetary assaults. Every scenario includes the potential employer who is offering the contract, rate of pay, and possible types of action, as well as details on local politics, possible problems, potential opposition and local conditions.
- The second booklet contains a contract for every scenario. A photocopy of the relevant contract for the mission is given to the players at the start of the scenario. Once the players and the potential employer have agreed on terms, the mission can begin.

== Publication history ==
FASA published the miniatures wargame BattleTech in 1984, and many supplements and sourcebooks followed. In 1993, FASA simultaneously published BattleTech: Mercenaries and BattleTech; Hot Spots, the latter designed by Chris Hussey and Scott Jenkins, with artwork by Bryn Barnard, Steve Bryant, Malcolm Hee, Ernie Hernandez, Jeff Laubenstein, Larry MacDougall and Mike Nielsen.

== Reception ==
In Issue 16 of the Australian game magazine Australian Realms, Graham Holman liked the photocopied contract handed out at the start of the mission, saying "This adds realism to pre-mission negotiations." Holman noted that the missions were a bit on the simple side, pointing out, "Some of the instructions for referees seem a bit condescending but this set is targeted at those starting out in BattleTech. More experienced players will still find Hot Spots a quick way to create some basic scenarios with scope for tailoring them to your campaign." Holman concluded, "For those just starting out, or out of fresh ideas, this is worth adding to your collection."

In Issue 46 of White Wolf (August 1994), Robert DeVoe noted "you get outlines for 64 missions and several new tools, making your job a little easier. I recommend this set for any BattleTech campaign." DeVoe concluded by giving this product a rating of 4 out of 5.
