= Halmahera plate =

Small tectonic plate in the Molucca Sea

Halmahera plate has recently (1990s) been postulated to be a microplate within the Molucca Sea Collision Zone of eastern Indonesia.

== Regional tectonics ==
The tectonic setting of the Molucca Sea region is unique. It is the only global example of an active arc-arc collision consuming an oceanic basin via subduction in two directions. The Molucca Sea plate has been subsumed by tectonic microplates, the Halmahera plate and the Sangihe plate. The whole complexity is now known as the Molucca Sea Collision Zone.

The existence of Halmahera as a tectonic plate separate from the Molucca Sea plate is not yet entirely agreed upon by paleogeologists. Some see Halmahera as an eastern slab of the Molucca Sea plate, just as they regard Sangihe as a western slab of the Molucca Sea plate. What is apparent to date is that Halmahera was part of the Molucca Sea slab subducted during the Neogene between 45 Ma and 25 Ma.

Seismicity shows the east-dipping Halmahera reaches a depth of about 200 km. Seismic tomography suggests that the Halmahera goes deeper to at least 400 km. Both Sangihe and Halmahera are exposed to the surface while the Molucca Sea plate is completely subsumed below these two microplates. The southern boundary of the Molucca Sea plate is also the boundary of the Philippine Sea plate and the Australian plate, and is moving northwards. Since the Sangihe plate and the Halmahera plate are in continuity with the Molucca Sea plate, this implies all three slabs are moving northward in mantle with the Australian plate.

A broad high-velocity zone beneath the Bird's Head plate at 400–600 km depth is interpreted by R Hall and W Spakman as indicating a remnant slab subducted below the Halmahera plate, and another broad high-velocity zone beneath the Celebes Sea at 700–1000 km depth is interpreted as a remnant slab below the Sangihe plate, both remnants having originated from a slab subducted beneath the Philippine-Halmahera Arc 45 Ma to 25 Ma ago.

In this model, the Bird's Head and Halmahera plates are separated by the Sorong Fault, a major lateral east–west fault.

An earlier model considered the area to be the Halmahera Arc, a volcanic arc of islands without a tectonic plate base. More recent studies in the 1990s and later, have displaced this theory with the Halmahera plate theory.

== See also ==
- Molucca Sea Collision Zone
- Philippine Mobile Belt
