= Galápagos triple junction =

Tectonic plate junction in the Pacific Ocean

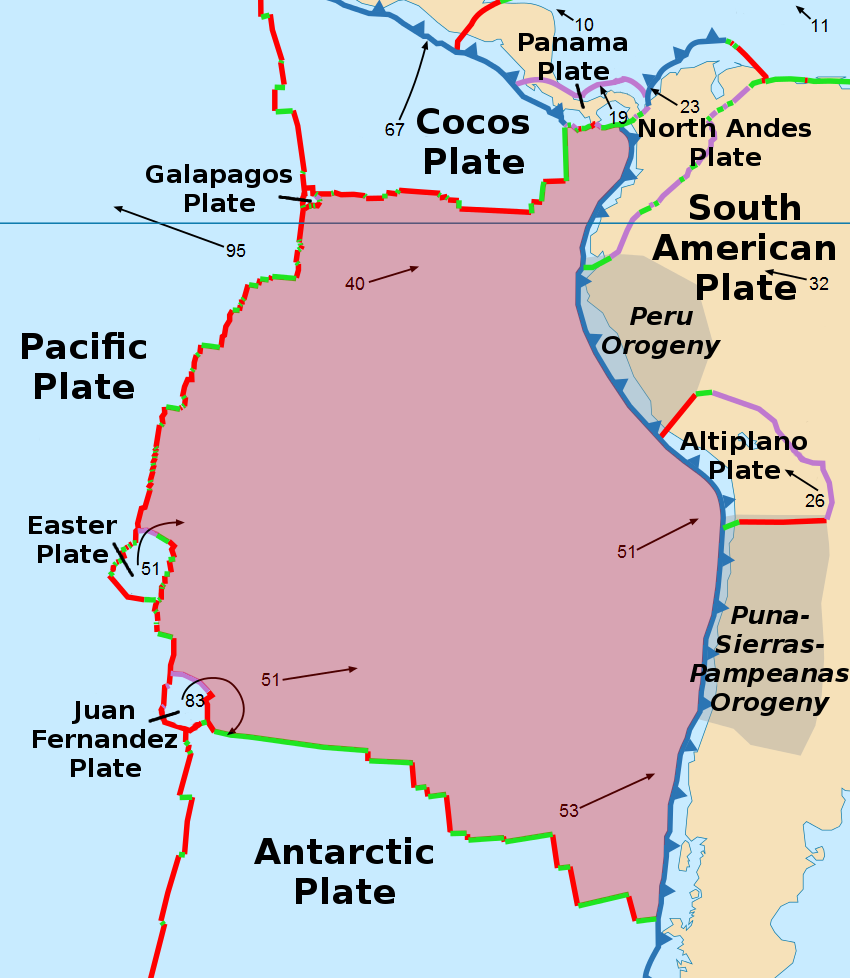
The Galápagos microplate is forming at the triple junction of the Nazca (shown in pink), Cocos, and Pacific plates

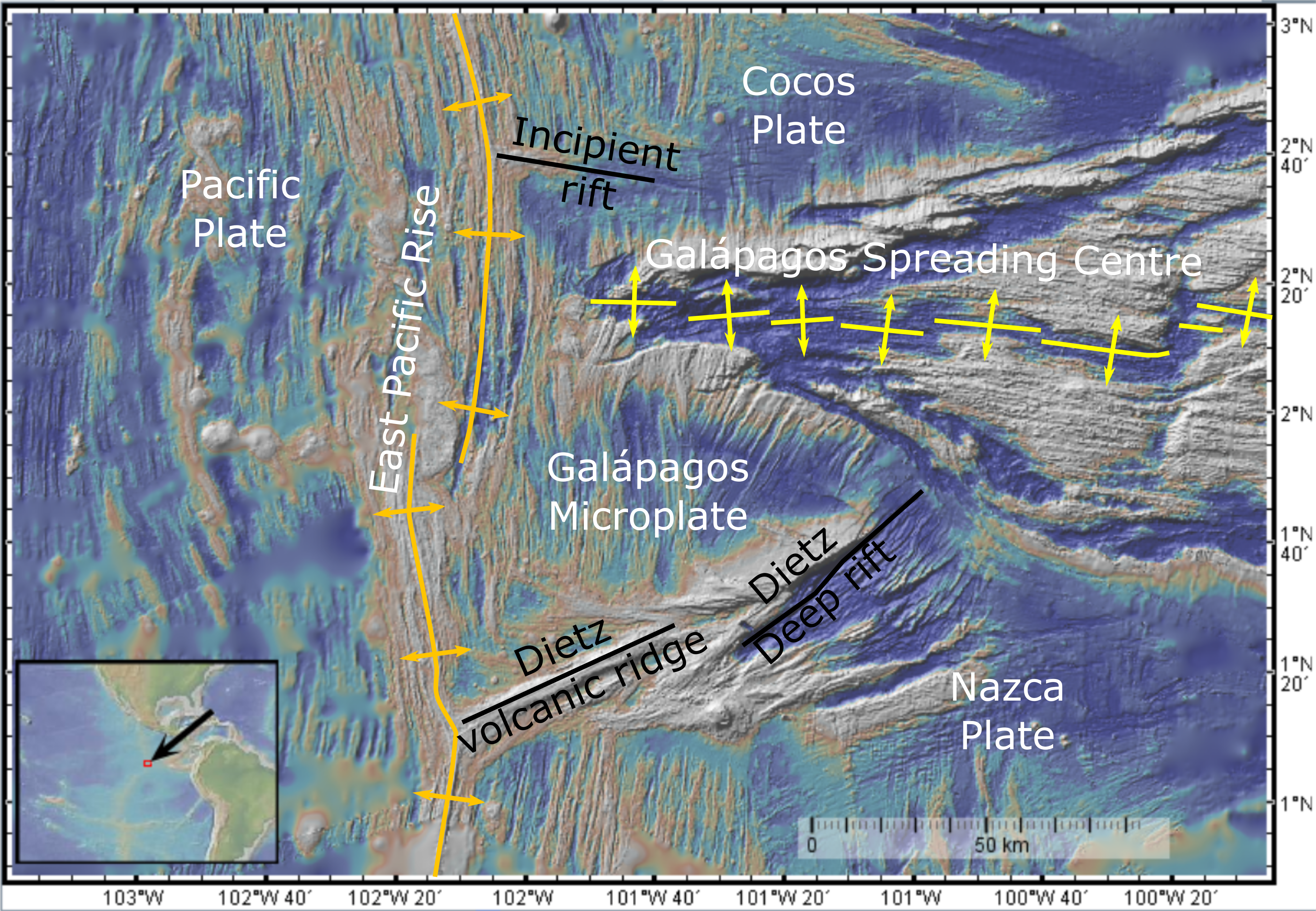
Detailed bathymetric map of the triple junction area showing main tectonic features

The Galápagos Triple Junction (GTJ) is a geological area in the eastern Pacific Ocean several hundred miles west of the Galápagos Islands where three tectonic plates – the Cocos plate, the Nazca plate, and the Pacific plate – meet. It is an unusual type of triple junction in which the three plates do not meet at a simple intersection. Instead, the junction includes two small microplates, the Galápagos microplate and the northern Galápagos microplate, caught in the junction, turning synchronously with respect to each other and separated by the Hess Deep rift.

== Introduction ==
The GTJ is located off the western coast of South America and has been studied for its unique geologic structure of a triple junction. Although this collision is not uniform in its entirety, geologists and scientists have used various forms of study in an attempt to understand its physical history. Over time, it has been hypothesized that the triple junction of the Nazca, Cocos, and Pacific plates was once colliding in various areas but now is a simple RRR (ridge-ridge-ridge), with all divergent spreading ridges. These plates have different directions and velocities of movement, which have all over time adjusted providing new tectonic formations like various spreading ridges and the Galápagos microplate. Collision of oceanic plates often cause specific landforms like volcanic arc systems, and divergent plates cause trenches and seafloor spreading patterns and both are secondary formations due to the greater tectonics of this area. These structures are seen in the GTJ area, implying that not only divergent boundaries are present but smaller convergent/transform as well. Determining relative geological ages in the area is challenging due to constant volcanic activity along spreading ridges and trenches bordering each plate boundary.

== Location ==
Approximately 1300 miles west off the coast of Ecuador, is where this tectonic activity is occurring in the middle of the Pacific Ocean. The Galápagos microplate is just to the east (about 600 miles from the Galápagos Islands). The coordinates of the spreading zones are 1.4°S, 99.8°W. These were estimated by earthquake data and bathymetric imaging.

== Geology ==
Triple junctions occur when three plates are all moving in different directions while remaining next to one another. Typically meet in the shape of a 'T' with one plate along the top line of the 'T', and one on both sides of the vertical perpendicular stem of the 'T'. All three of these plates are colliding at its intersection point of both the vertical and horizontal lines. Like plates all over the world, each plate moves with its own unique direction and speed. Each plate is moving with a different velocity which can change the outcome and shape of the whole triple junction.

In the Galápagos triple junction, the three corresponding plates don't collide perfectly but instead display differences in responses to individual velocities. The GTJ does not form a typical ridge–ridge–ridge triple junction. In plate collision, this would be the "perfect" scenario. Divergent and convergent plate boundaries can form ridges, trenches, and/or faults. The shortened R, T, and F are used to symbolize when put together what kind of structures are formed on the plate boundaries. In collisional plate movement such as these, geologist use these letter symbols to denote the kind of junction created from colliding plates, so the perfect scenario would be "RRR", one for each edge of the colliding t-shape.

Since this these faults along each plate are not uniform or consistent, the Galápagos microplate is being created via different velocities and directions of spreading that have changed over millions of years. In the GTJ, the Pacific plate, Cocos plate, Galápagos microplate, and Nazca plate are all the present tectonics at work. This activity is causing 3 different rift areas, an extended volcanic ridge, and a large dominant spreading center. The Pacific plate is moving the fastest at 95 mm/yr NE, then the Cocos plate moving relatively N-NW 67 mm/yr, and 40 mm/yr E –NE for the Nazca plate. Differing border velocities that detect the rate of spreading as well as the lack of/slowing of spreading are also considered as well.

To detect these plate boundaries, landforms were identified using bathymetry and sample drilling. Drilling obtained data of rock compositions that make up this area along seafloor spreading ridges. Peridotite, gabbro, basalt and diabase are present. These are deep ocean rock forms that similarly make up ophiolites.
