= Galápagos microplate =

Very small tectonic plate at the Galápagos triple junction

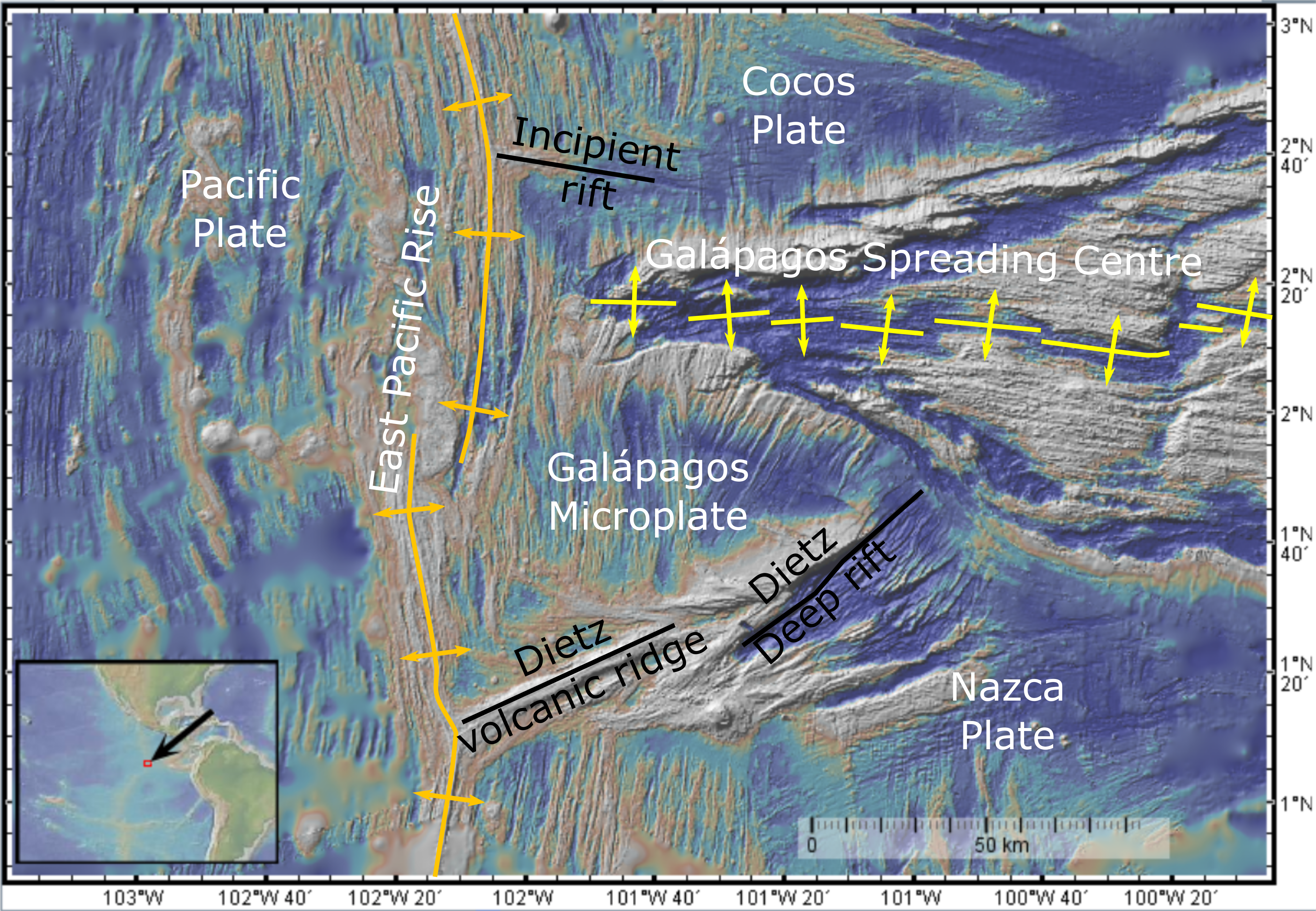
Bathymetric map of area around the Galápagos microplate with main tectonic features marked

The Galápagos microplate (GMP) is a geological feature of the oceanic crust located at 1°50' N, offshore of the west coast of Colombia. The GMP is collocated with the Galápagos triple junction (GTJ), which is an atypical ridge–ridge–ridge triple junction. At the GTJ, the Pacific plate, Cocos plate, and Nazca plate meet incompletely, forming two counter-rotating microplates at the junction of the Cocos–Nazca, Pacific–Cocos, and Pacific–Nazca spreading ridges.

== Geological evolution ==
The entire Galapagos microplate, which covers an area of 13,000 km^{2}, was formed to accommodate the motions of three major moving plates. Before the formation of the Galapagos microplate, the GTJ was a conventional ridge–ridge–ridge junction. The history of the microplate can be traced back to 1.4 million years ago, as evidenced by the trace of the southern triple junction ridge on the Pacific plate that constitutes the southern boundary of the Galápagos microplate. At that time, the southern boundary of the microplate was then starting to form by an active hotspot located beneath the East Pacific Rise. The hotspot drifted from the Pacific plate to the Nazca plate approximately 1.2 million years ago and a seamount chain began to develop on the Nazca plate. As the hotspot continued to migrate, rifting of the Nazca plate developed along its track. This boundary is now known as Dietz Deep Volcanic Ridge, which extends to the northeast and grows at a velocity of 39 mm/year. The Dietz Deep Ridge terminates at the Dietz Deep Basin, an extensional feature with high elevational relief. The seamounts have been volcanically active with ongoing eruptions and continue to uplift the Dietz Deep Volcanic Ridge.

The local shape of the East Pacific Rise has varied with the development of the Galapagos microplate. Approximately 1.5 million years ago, the East Pacific Rise was convex towards the west. Over time, the axis of the East Pacific Rise straightened and the triple junction began to migrate southward.

== Structure ==
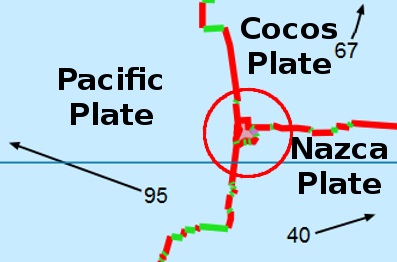

The microplate is divided into two regions between north (northern Galapagos microplate) and south (Galapagos microplate). The Galapagos microplate is bounded by the Dietz volcanic ridge at 1°10'N, south of the Cocos–Nazca Ridge, and the northern Galapagos microplate (NGMP) is bounded by the incipient ridge at 2°40'N, north of Cocos–Nazca Ridge. The westward propagating and slowly diverging Cocos-Nazca Ridge cuts between the two sub-plates toward the East Pacific Rise. However, the tip of Cocos–Nazca Ridge does not fully meet the East Pacific Rise and, in fact, the westerly propagating Cocos-Nazca Ridge generates secondary transient rifts by shear stresses. The tip of the Cocos-Nazca ridge has maintained a distance of 50 km from the East Pacific Rise and slightly moved its position into the eastern part of the microplate due to clockwise rotation of the GMP.

The North Galapagos microplate is rotating counterclockwise between three much larger crustal plates around it, the Nazca, Cocos and Pacific plates. To its south, another small microplate, the Galapagos Microplate is likewise rotating, but clockwise. Both microplates "mesh" along the interface between them.

== Motion of the Galapagos microplate and northern Galapagos microplate ==
=== Galapagos microplate ===
Current estimates of the microplate motion may be inaccurate because the limited observational data set is too small for the large vector-based calculation assumptions. That said, the estimated rotational pole is located at 1.4°S, 99.8°W, 400 km southeast from the center of the microplate and 350 km from its closest boundary. Motion is counter-clockwise at 6°/Myr. This rate is in agreement with the northerly strike of the Pacific-Galapagos abyssal hills.

=== Northern Galapagos microplate (NGMP) ===
The wedge-shaped Incipient Ridge characterizes the entire motion of the NGMP, as evidenced by recent magmatic activity and magnetic anomaly profiles. The eastern end of the Incipient Ridge is detected cutting through the north–south trending abyssal hills, and both bathymetric and magnetic data have shown recent magmatism along this ridge, supporting the idea that a counterclockwise pivot is located here. The rotation of the NGMP can be understood as clockwise-rotating blocks dragged by shear stresses from plate edges.
