= Sorong Fault =

Sorong fault also (Sorong Fault Zone, SFZ) is an active, broad zone of inferred left lateral shear at the triple junction of the Australian plate, Eurasian plate, and Pacific plate, where many plate fragments exist, such as the Philippine Sea plate, Bird's Head plate, Halmahera plate and the Molucca Sea plate. It has been implicated in numerous large earthquakes. It is one of the two major faults created by the Australian and Pacific plate convergence, the other being the Ramu-Markham Fault zone. The fault triggered the destructive 1998 North Maluku earthquake which killed 41 people.

== Location ==
The Sorong fault begins around Sulawesi and runs towards New Guinea. It marks the boundary between Halmahera plate and Bird's Head plate. The Sorong fault system has been documented to extend westward more than 500 miles (800 km) from Teluk Sarera to Kepulauan Banggai.

== Geology ==
The fault zone juxtaposes Mesozoic-Tertiary continental and volcanic arc/ophiolitic rocks.

== Plate evolution ==
It is widely believed that fragments of the northern Australian continental margin in New Guinea are being detached and translated westward in this shear zone until they collide with the eastern margin of Eurasia (Sundaland) in the region of Sulawesi Island. However, the details of terrane translation, amalgamation, and docking remain poorly documented at this time. In particular, the timing of events is very poorly constrained, with estimates for the commencement of the SFZ ranging from early Miocene or older to Pleistocene. Investigations in the 1990s of the SFZ and the adjacent regions of Sulawesi and Irian Jaya (Indonesian New Guinea), including fieldwork in several of the SFZ island-terranes (Waigeo Island, Halmahera, Bacan, Obi Islands, and Sula Islands), suggest a less mobilist interpretation of the region than previous reconstructions. SFZ did not begin to develop in its present form before the late Miocene.

== See also ==
- List of earthquakes in Indonesia
