= Eastern Gemini Seamount =

Seamount in the western Pacific Ocean

- Summit depth: 80 m (260 ft)

Location
- Location: Southwestern Pacific Ocean
- Coordinates: 20°59′S 170°17′E
- Country: France or Vanuatu

Geology
- Type: Submarine volcano
- Last eruption: February 1996

The Eastern Gemini Seamount, also known as Oscostar, is a seamount in the southwestern Pacific Ocean, about halfway between Vanuatu's Tanna and Matthew Islands. The only recorded eruption from Eastern Gemini was observed by a passing ship on February 18, 1996, when bursts of very dark water were observed.

== See also ==
- List of volcanoes in French Southern and Antarctic Lands
