= Cape Johnson Guyot =

Underwater tablemount in the Pacific Ocean

Coordinates: 17°08′N 177°15′W

Cape Johnson Guyot is a guyot in the Pacific Ocean, more precisely in the Mid-Pacific Mountains, and the type locality of guyots. It is of middle Cretaceous age and a number of fossils have been dredged from it.

== Name ==
Cape Johnson Guyot is also known as Cape Johnson Seamount or Cape Johnson Tablemount. The guyot was named by Harry Hammond Hess, after his ship the USS Cape Johnson; Hess had also named the kind of flat-topped seamount "guyot" and another seamount was named after Hess himself. The seamount was first described in a 1946 publication. Both Hess and Cape Johnson were discovered during the same cruise and Cape Johnson Guyot is the type locality of guyots.

== Geography and geology ==
The seamount lies in the Mid-Pacific Mountains on their southern side and is a submarine mountain with a flat top that rises over 3,000 metres (10,000 ft) to a depth of 1,692 metres (5,551 ft)-1,778 metres (5,833 ft). The flat top has an oval shape and a surface area of 6 by 12 nautical miles (11 km × 22 km; 6.9 mi × 13.8 mi); it is characterized by a limestone dome on the summit, buried beneath sediments; in turn a volcanic hill is buried within the limestone dome. The top of the seamount has a hummocky appearance which has been interpreted as a sediment cover and its southeastern sector has a bank-like shape that resembles that of an atoll. Cape Johnson Guyot is considered to be of Middle Cretaceous age with an age of 120 million years reported and shallow-water fossils were emplaced on it at that time.

Apatite, basaltic sandstone containing hypersthene, clay, limestone, manganese crusts, manganese oxide, phosphorite and lithified carbonates have been found on Cape Johnson Guyot; some carbonates of biogenic origin have been altered by apatite. Globigerina ooze is also found on the seamount and can reach substantial thickness; such accumulations might be formed by ocean currents. Similar rocks have been found at other guyots of the Mid-Pacific Mountains.

== Biology ==
During the Cretaceous, corals and rudists lived on Cape Johnson Guyot and fossils have been dated to 91-112 million years ago; some corals and rudists are of Albian to Cenomanian age. Fossils of anthozoa, gastropods, reef-building hexacorals, pelecypods, stromatoporoids and Tridacna were also found. The Cretaceous fossils Actinostroma pacifica, Astrocoenia dietzi, Brachyseris montemarina, the caprinid rudists Caprina mediopacifica, Caprina mulleri - including a detailedly described holotype of the latter - and Cardita sp., Lophosmilia fundimaritima, Montastrea menardii, Nerinea sp. and Tiarasmilia casteri occur on Cape Johnson Guyot. Caprina mulleri was also found on other Mid-Pacific Mountains. About 300 species of extant foraminifera have been found on the seamount as well, with additional fossil foraminifera including Paleocene-Eocene specimens that were redeposited by ocean currents. Finally, a cetacean bone of undetermined age has also been found on Cape Johnson Guyot.
