= Erimo Seamount =

Seamount in the Pacific Ocean

Erimo
- Location within Japan
- Summit depth: 3,729 metres (12,234 ft)
- Height: 4.2 kilometres (2.6 mi)

Location
- Location: Western Pacific Ocean
- Coordinates: 40.947°N 144.971°E

Geology
- Age of rock: Cretaceous

Erimo Seamount (also known as Sisoev Seamount) is a seamount off Hokkaido, Japan. Located close to the intersection between the Kuril-Kamchatka and Japan Trenches, it is in the process of being subducted. The Cretaceous seamount formed 100-120 million years ago and is covered by a limestone cap. Tiltmeters have been installed on its top, and animals (ascidians) live on it.

== Geography and geomorphology ==
=== Regional ===
Erimo Seamount lies southeast of Cape Erimo of Hokkaido, Japan. The seamount lies close to the intersection between the Kuril–Kamchatka Trench to the northeast and the Japan Trench to the south, and is sometimes used to define the boundary as their hadal areas are separated by the seamount even if it doesn't separate their animal populations. Erimo Seamount lies 15 kilometres (9.3 mi) oceanward and south and east from the trenches and it forms the northern tip of the Japan Trench; there the Pacific Plate subducts at a rate of 8 centimetres per year (3.1 in/year), together with the seamounts on it such as Erimo which is currently entering the trench. Other seamounts in the area are Takuyo-Daiichi to the east-northeast and Ryofu-Daini to the east-southeast, and there is evidence of another seamount northwest of Erimo and in the process of being subducted. Unlike other seamounts, Erimo is not part of a seamount chain. Possibly, as such a seamount or a seamount chain subducted it indented the trenches, forming a 20 kilometres (12 mi) re-entrant.

=== Local ===
The seamount is a guyot which rises about 4.2 kilometres (2.6 mi) to a depth of 3,729 metres (12,234 ft), where a flat top is covered by early Cretaceous limestone that contains gastropods, green algae and red algae from that time. Erimo Seamount is cut by normal faults that run parallel to the Kuril-Kamchatka Trench, and the seamount is tilting and beginning to break apart as its subduction starts. It has a volume of about 1,100 cubic kilometres (260 cu mi), making it a mid-sized seamount by Pacific Ocean seamount standards, with a northeast-southwest elongated shape and a maximum width of 35 kilometres (22 mi) and recognizable rift zones. The crust underneath Erimo contains the magnetic anomaly M8 and has an age of about 120 million years.

Volcanic rocks dredged from Erimo Seamount include alkali basalt, brecciated basalts, silty sandstone, trachyandesites or trachytes. During the Cretaceous, carbonate rocks were emplaced at shallow depth on the seamount, which subsided by about 3 kilometres (1.9 mi). As the seamount has entered the trench, further subsidence of about 800 metres (2,600 ft) has taken place.

== Age ==
Erimo Seamount formed in the Cretaceous in an off-ridge setting but close to a spreading center; it is about 100-120 million years old, while potassium-argon dating has yielded an age of 80 million years and argon-argon dating of 104 ± 9 million years. Cretaceous volcanic activity has generated seamounts all across the Western Pacific Ocean, but Erimo today is inactive. This seamount appears to be part of a large hotspot-generated seamount province whose youngest activity is currently located in French Polynesia.
