= Molucca Sea Collision Zone =

Region of complex tectonic activity in Indonesia

The Molucca Sea Collision Zone is postulated by paleogeologists to explain the tectonics of the area based on the Molucca Sea in Indonesia.

== Tectonics ==
The tectonic relationship of the Sangihe plate, Halmahera plate, and the Molucca Sea plate, plus the volcanic Halmahera Arc and the Sangihe Arc is complex. Their interrelationship constitutes the Molucca Sea Collision Zone. The north of this zone interlinks with the Philippine Mobile Belt. Some call this linkage the Philippine–Halmahera Arc and consider it an integral part of the elongated zone of convergence extending north through the Philippines into eastern Taiwan. In the Molucca Sea Collision Zone model, the Molucca Sea plate has been totally consumed by the arc-arc collision of the Halmahera Arc and the Sangihe Arc of eastern Indonesia.

== Single collision zones ==
The magmatic systems are reaching the end of their life as island arcs and are becoming a single collision zone, lending weight to the contention that Halmahera and Sangihe should be regarded as tectonic plates rather than volcanic arcs.

== Northern extension ==
Seismic and tomographic discrepancies in the mantle up to 400 km below Mindanao in the Philippines, indicate it is a more advanced northern extension of the Molucca Sea Collision Zone.
