= Rano Rahi seamounts =

Field of seamounts in the Pacific Ocean

Rano Rahi (Rapa Nui: "Many volcanoes") is a field of seamounts in the Pacific Ocean. These seamounts in part form a series of ridges on the Pacific Plate pointing away from the neighbouring East Pacific Rise and which were volcanically active until about 230,000 years ago, and possibly even more recently.

The origin of these seamounts is unclear. Proposals include the effect of tectonic forces on the Pacific Plate and the presence of mantle flow towards the East Pacific Rise.

== Geography and geomorphology ==
This field lies west of the East Pacific Rise, (Note: Sometimes the field is mapped on the eastern side of the Rise as well. In these models, the field extends 500 kilometres (310 mi) west from the East Pacific Rise.) and covers an area between the Rise and 118° western longitude and between 17° and 19° southern latitude. The Pukapuka submarine ridge extends west of the field towards the Tuamotu islands.

The Rano Rahi seamount field consists of several chains of seamounts that emanate from the East Pacific Rise. These chains are lined up in the direction of the motion of the Pacific Plate, and as they get farther away from the East Pacific Ridge, the seamounts increasingly overlap with each other until they form ridges, which reach median lengths of 62 kilometres (39 mi). The seamounts in the field are typically less than 1 kilometre (0.62 mi) high but several kilometres wide; seamounts that are part of a ridge are 1.0–1.5 kilometres (0.62–0.93 mi) high. The total volume of rocks in the seamount province is about 9,100 cubic kilometres (2,200 cu mi).

== Geology ==
The crust underneath the field is no more than 6.5 million years old, and it has a number of anomalous features in the field, compared to oceanic crust elsewhere. Vigorous hydrothermal activity and shallow magma chambers characterize the neighbouring sector of the East Pacific Rise, showing evidence of larger availability of magma.

Acoustic reflectivity indicates that a number of these seamounts were volcanically active in the last 200,000 years, if not within the last 50,000 years. Argon-argon dating has yielded ages between 230,000 years and 4.67 million years on rocks dredged from the seamounts. Paleomagnetism indicates that the volcanoes were active over two phases, separated by long periods of rest, and the first phase of activity occurred when the volcanoes were at distances of about 50 kilometres (31 mi) or less from the Rise. Lava flows or landslide deposits appear to surround a number of the seamounts. Volcanic rocks dredged from the seamounts are mostly tholeiite and alkali basalt.

A number of processes has been proposed to explain the formation of seamounts close to spreading ridges. In the case of Rano Rahi, both line-like sources and point-like sources of magma may be involved, with a common source of magma that results in a tradeoff between the sizes of neighbouring seamount chains. Seismic tomography has identified low-velocity material beneath the seamounts which may be flows in the mantle. The neighbouring Pukapuka ridge appears to be related to the Rano Rahi seamounts, which are located east of its eastern end and form a wedge-shaped extension thereof. Among the theories on the origin of Rano Rahi are:

- Flow of mantle material from a hotspot towards the spreading ridge. One variant on this theory states that a "river" of mantle material flows from the South Pacific Superswell to the East Pacific Rise, forming the Pukapuka ridge above its axis and a "delta" close to the Rise, with the Rano Rahi seamounts on top of this delta.
- Crustal extension caused by changed lithospheric stress patterns after about 6–5 million years ago.

== Names ==
Some of the seamounts and seamount groups have proposed names, (Note: Names which have been submitted to the General Bathymetric Chart of the Oceans as candidate toponyms in its gazetteer; a list of names is available.) like Beraiti, Haka, Hotu Matua, Huri Huri, and Paiti. The names are mostly derived from the Rapa Nui language, which also lends the name to the field; it means "many volcanoes".
