= Sangihe plate =

Microplate within eastern Indonesia

Sangihe plate has recently (1990s) been postulated to be a microplate within the Molucca Sea Collision Zone of eastern Indonesia.

== Regional tectonics ==
The tectonic setting of the Molucca Sea region is unique. It is the only global example of an active arc-arc collision consuming an oceanic basin via subduction in two directions. The Molucca Sea plate has been subsumed by tectonic microplates, the Halmahera plate and the Sangihe plate. The whole complexity is now known as the Molucca Sea Collision Zone.

The existence of Sangihe as a tectonic plate separate from the Molucca Sea plate is not yet entirely agreed upon by geologists. Some see Sangihe as a western slab of the Molucca Sea plate, just as they regard Halmahera as an eastern slab of the Molucca Sea plate. What is apparent to date is that Sangihe was part of the Molucca Sea slab subducted during the Neogene between 45 Ma and 25 Ma.

Seismicity shows the west-dipping Sangihe reaches a depth of about 650 kilometres (400 mi). Both Sangihe and Halmahera are exposed to the surface while the Molucca Sea plate is completely subsumed below these two microplates. The southern boundary of the Molucca Sea plate is also the boundary of the Philippine Sea plate and the Australian plate, and is moving northwards. Since the Sangihe plate and the Halmahera plate are in continuity with the Molucca Sea plate, this implies all three slabs are moving northward in mantle with the Australian plate.

== See also ==
- Philippine Mobile Belt – Tectonic boundary
- Molucca Sea Collision Zone – Region of complex tectonic activity in Indonesia
