= Molucca Sea plate =

Small fully subducted tectonic plate near Indonesia

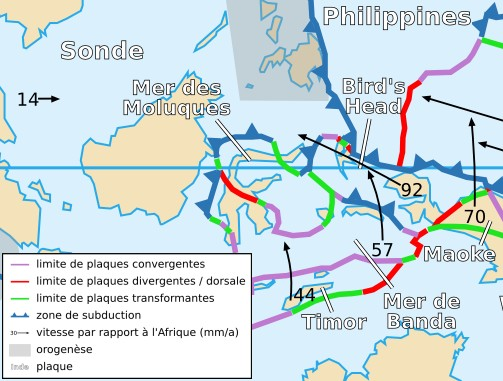
- Type: Minor
- Movement^{1}: north
- Speed^{1}: 30-40 mm/year
- Features: Sulawesi, Molucca Sea
- ^{1}Relative to the African plate

Located in the western Pacific Ocean near Indonesia, the Molucca Sea plate has been classified by scientists as a fully subducted microplate that is part of the Molucca Sea Collision Complex. The Molucca Sea plate represents the only known example of divergent double subduction (DDS), which describes the subduction on both sides of a single oceanic plate.

== Tectonic setting ==
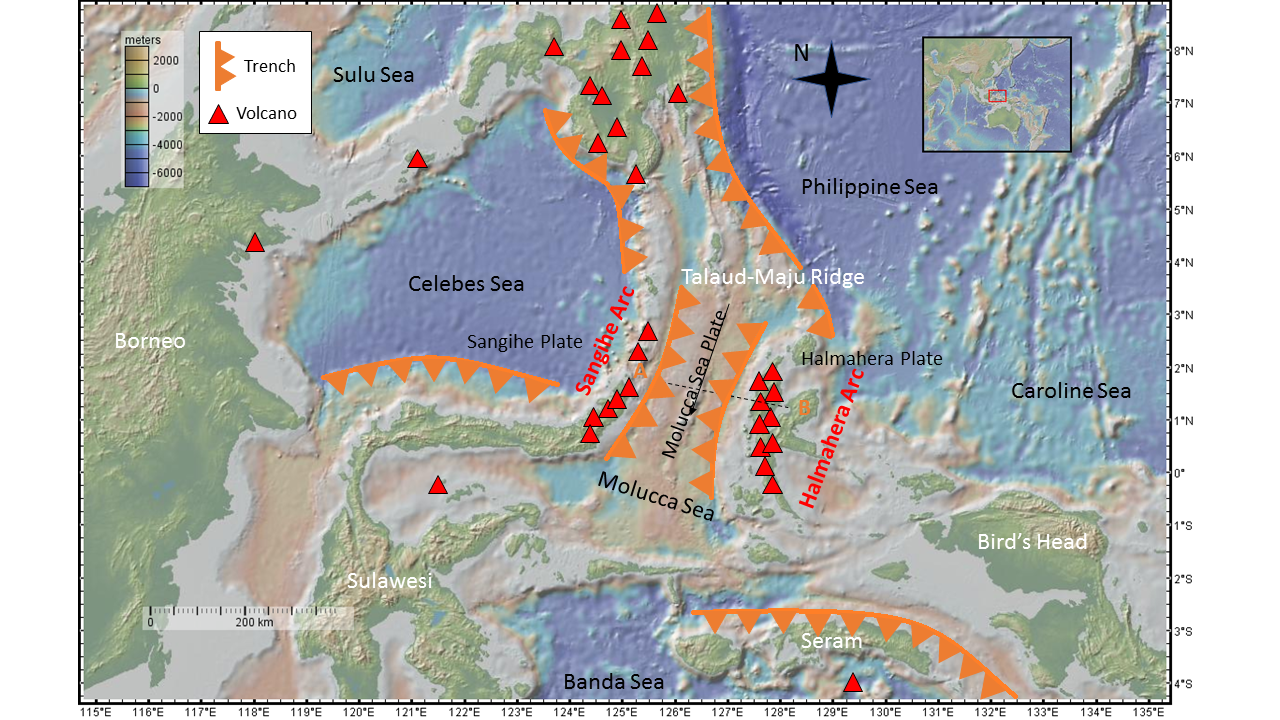
Molucca Sea Collision Zone modified by Zhang et al. using GeoMapApp

The Molucca Sea plate is one of many tectonic features that compose the Molucca Sea Collision Complex, which refers to the tectonic relationship of the Sangihe plate, Halmahera plate, and the Molucca Sea plate, in addition to the volcanic Halmahera and Sangihe Arcs. The southeast moving Sangihe plate is situated along the western boundary of the Molucca Sea plate. The northwest moving Halmahera plate is situated along the eastern boundary of the Molucca Sea plate. In the western Pacific Ocean, the Molucca Sea is bordered by the Indonesian Islands of Celebes (Sulawesi) to the west, Halmahera to the east, and the Sula Islands to the south. The Molucca Sea borders the Banda Sea to the south and the Celebes Sea to the west. To the north is the Philippine Sea and to the east is the Halmahera Sea. Situated south of Mindanao, the Molucca Sea is a narrow basin underlined by a north‐south ophiolitic ridge, which uplifts the central region of the basin.

== Plate mechanics ==
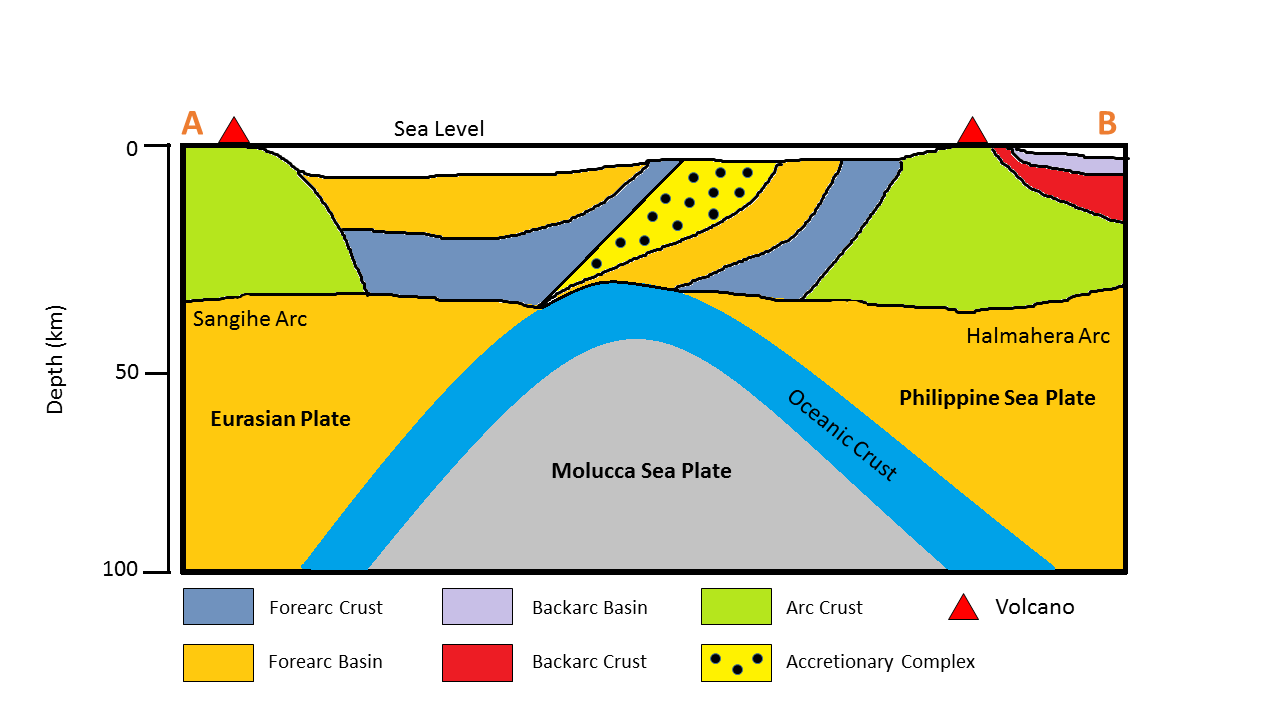
Cross Section of Molucca Sea Collision Zone modified by Zhang et al.

While the scientific community has not come to a consensus as to when the Molucca Sea plate became fully subducted, the dominant theory is that the Molucca Sea plate has been completely subducted beneath the overriding Halmahera and Sangihe plates. When actively subducting, the crustal collision of the Molucca Sea plate was formed by surface intersection of "oppositely dipping Benioff zones” (also known as divergent double subduction) which results in the Sangihe and Halmahera volcanic arcs. The force exerted by the thick overlying collision complex of the Halmahera and Sangihe plates effectively depressed the crust of the Molucca Sea plate. The plate itself features an asymmetrical morphology, configured in an inverted U-shape. The arc-arc collision zone of the Molucca Sea plate is characterized as a thick, low velocity layer, which is highly variable in density. The variable in density of the Molucca Sea plate led to different subduction velocities on the two sides. Divergent Double Subduction may facilitate various tectonic processes, including closure of ocean basins, accretion and amalgamation of volcanic arcs, and growth of continents.

== Earthquakes ==
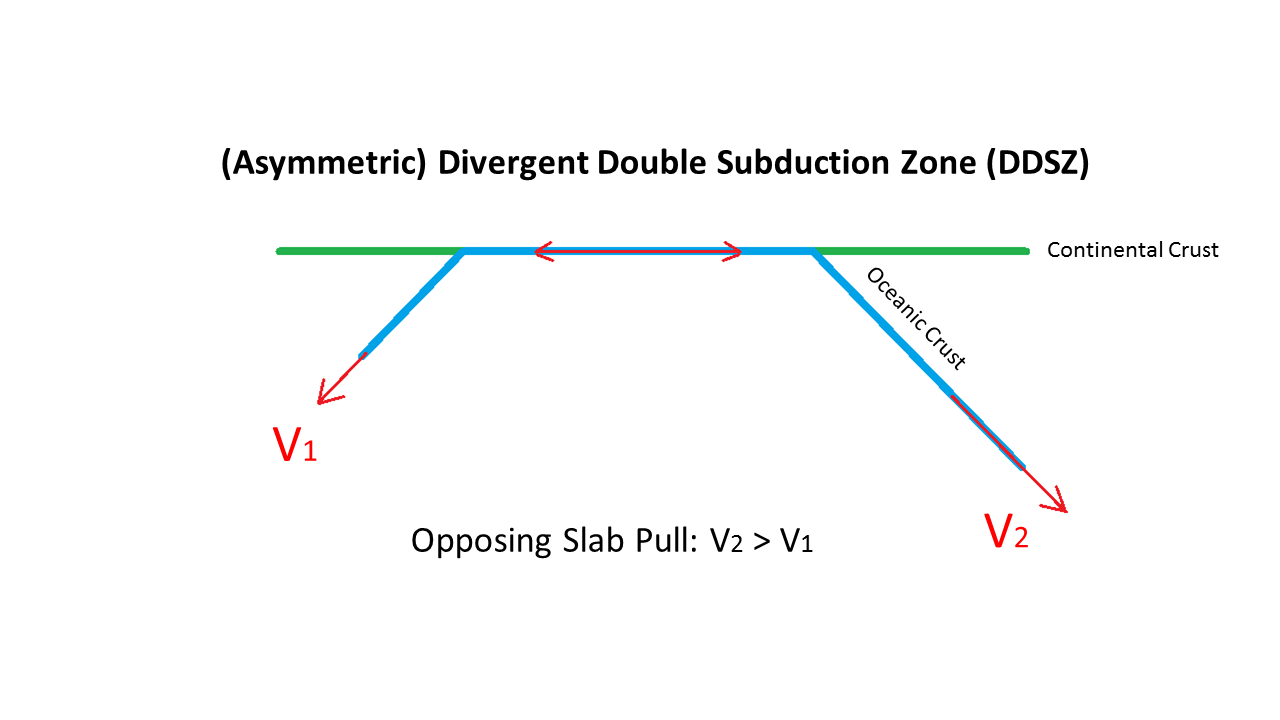
(Asymmetric) Divergent Double Subduction Zone modified by Zhao et al.

Historically, the Molucca Sea plate has experienced hundreds of earthquakes ranging in magnitude. The most recent large earthquake occurred in January 2017 when a 7.3 magnitude earthquake deep beneath the Celebes Sea, which the USGS attributed to the “deep reverse faulting within the inclined seismic zone defining the deep limit of the Molucca Sea microplate beneath the Celebes Sea Basin.”

== Geology ==
The geologic characteristics displayed on the surrounding islands provide insight regarding the complex plate movement of the divergent double subducting plate. Detached ophiolitic series and thick melanges are overlain by forearc deposits; subduction-driven east–west shortening of the Snellius Plateau caused the thrust melanges to reactivate and deform the forearc series. Exposed ophiolitic rocks can be found on the islands of the submarine Talaud-Mayu Ridge, which bisects the arc-arc collision zone of the Molucca Sea plate; these ophiolites provide insight regarding the relationship between earthquakes and uplift surrounding the plate.

== See also ==
- Molucca Sea Collision Zone
- Sangihe plate
- Halmahera plate
- List of earthquakes in Indonesia
