= Mariana Trough =

Active back-arc basin in the western Pacific Ocean

The Mariana Trough lies in the southern part of the IBM arc system in the Western Pacific. Guam and The Northern Mariana Islands mark its eastern limit.

The Mariana Trough is an active back-arc basin in the western Pacific Ocean (Stern, Fouch & Klemperer 2003). It is an integral part of the Izu–Bonin–Mariana Arc system.

== Location and Bathymetry ==
The Mariana Trough stretches 1300 km from north to south, about the distance from Los Angeles CA to Portland OR, Tokyo, Japan to Seoul, Korea, or London, England to Rome, Italy. The Mariana Trough has roughly the dimensions and areal extent of Japan or California. The Trough is crudely crescent-shaped, opening on the south; it is bounded to the east by the active Mariana arc, to the west by the remnant arc of the West Mariana Ridge (Karig 1972), and to the south by the Challenger Deep, part of the Mariana Trench. It narrows northward until the Mariana arc and West Mariana Ridge meet at about 24°N. It is widest in the middle, at 18°N, where it is about 240 km wide, and narrows to about half this at its southern, open end. Depths in the basin are distributed asymmetrically, being greater adjacent to the West Mariana Ridge than next to the active arc, due to a westward-thinning wedge of volcaniclastic sediments derived from the active arc, and also less thermal buoyancy of the mantle. Where not covered by sediments, the seafloor is deeper and bathymetry more rugged than normal. The most recent, "zero-age" seafloor of the Philippine Sea, including the Mariana Trough, lies at a mean depth of 3200 m compared to normal zero-age seafloor depths of 2500 m (Park, Tamaki & Kobayashi 1990).

Bathymetry of the Mariana Trough and surroundings. The figure was generated by Dr. F. Martinez University of Hawaii using open source software GMT version 4.14 and data bases (Smith and Sandwell and Smith global measured and predicted bathymetry file topo_9.1.img, )

== Extension style ==
The extension axis for the Mariana Trough can be subdivided along strike into a southern two-thirds characterized by slow seafloor spreading and a northern third characterized by rifting. From as far north as 19°45'N south to 13°10’N, the spreading ridge has the typical morphology of a slow-spreading ridge, with an axial graben that is sometimes occupied by a central ridge where volcanic activity is concentrated (neovolcanic zone); south of this the ridge more resembles a fast-spreading ridge, probably because magma supply is enhanced by proximity to the arc (Martinez, Fryer & Becker2000). Spreading half-rates in the region between 16° and 18°N are estimated at 1.5 to 2.2 cm/year (Bibee, Shor & Lu 1980). The ridge becomes punctiform north of 18°30', and true seafloor spreading does not occur north of 19°45'N (but see the different conclusion of Yamazaki, Murakami & Saito 1993). Rifting forms a series of amagmatic deeps between 19°45'N and 21°10'N called the 'Central Graben' (Martinez et al.). These basins have low heatflow, lack igneous activity, and are the deepest parts of the Mariana Trough (>5400 m). The deepest part of the Central Graben is also unique among active back-arc basins in exposing mantle peridotites along the extension axis (Stern et al. 1996). Extension north of the Central Graben occurs by combined tectonic and magmatic processes that are distinct from seafloor spreading, in a region known as the Volcano-Tectonic Zone (VTZ; Martinez et al.). The VTZ corresponds with a part of the Mariana Trough where the crust thickens from 6 to 15 km. The southern VTZ is dominated by fissure eruptions associated with a ridge-like feature, ~30 km long, which rises to less than 2800 m water depth and which is similar to the inflated segment at the southern terminus of the spreading ridge. The northern VTZ is dominated by point-source volcanism, with edifices spaced 50–60 km apart alternating with rift basins. There is no volcanic activity along the adjacent arc segment and it appears that the extension axis has captured the arc magma supply between the Kasuga cross-chain at 22°N and Nikko near 23°N, where the extension axis intersects the arc. North of this, incipient rifting is magmatically manifested by unusual, shoshonitic lavas of the Hiyoshi complex, Fukutoku-oka-no-ba (or Sin Iwo Jima), and Iwo Jima (Stern, Fouch & Klemperer 2003). Rifting and spreading are inferred to be propagating northward at a rate of 10 to 40 cm/year (Martinez et al.), so the variations in tectonic and magmatic style seen along-strike north of 18°N provide an example of the sequence of events that occur at any one section across the back-arc basin as the rift evolves from updoming through rifting to true spreading.
