= United States Virgin Islands mangroves =

Wetlands on the coast of the US Virgin Islands

United States Virgin Islands mangroves are flowering trees that occupy the majority of the wetlands in the Virgin Islands. These mangroves typically grow in areas that are close to the shore and thrive in oxygen-deprived, water-logged soils and salty conditions. In the Virgin Islands, there are three types of mangroves: red, black and white mangroves.

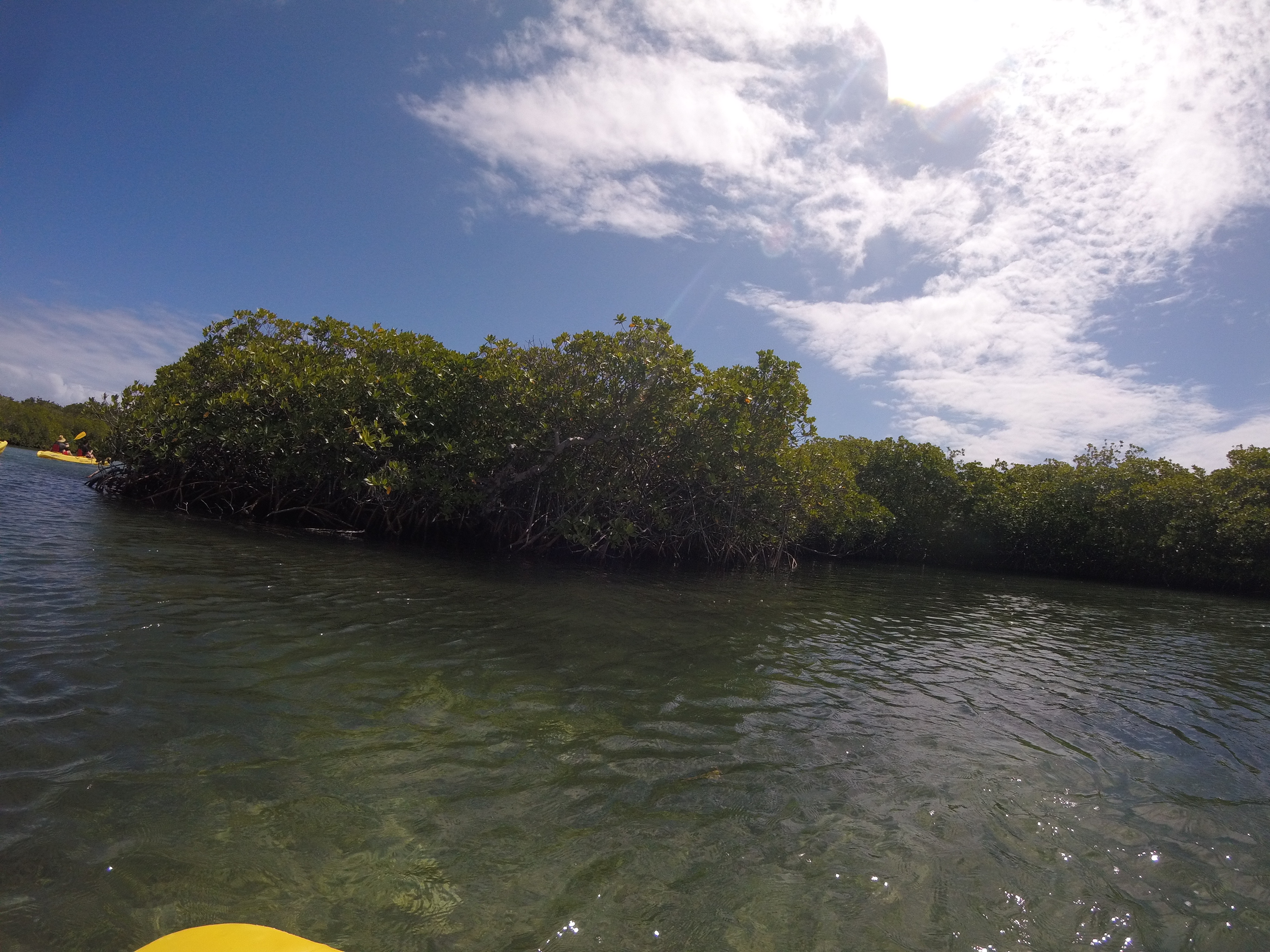
Mangroves located on St. Thomas

== Distribution ==
Red mangroves grow directly in water and do so by elevating themselves on prop roots. This type of mangroves can be found at the Mangrove Lagoon Marine Reserve and Wildlife Sanctuary in St. Thomas. Black mangroves, however, grow in drier areas, and white mangroves are typically found inland, in moist, sandy areas.

Mangroves can also be found at the Salt River Bay National Historical Park and Ecological Preserve in St. Croix and the Mary’s Creek and Francis Bay Pond in St. John.

== Ecology ==
The US Virgin Islands is home to three different types of mangroves that thrive in salty conditions: red, black, and white. Mangroves are distinguished by their ability to successfully grow in conditions where there is limited oxygen and water-logged soils.

The red mangrove (Rhizophora mangle) are recognized by the aboveground prop roots that help conduct air to the roots below ground and below the water, and by their broad leaves. Rhizophora mangle can reach 80 ft (24 m) in height in the tropics, however they typically grow to about 20 ft (6.1 m). This species are found on the water’s edge, and supply protection from storms and a rich habitat for a variety of different species on land and under water.

The black mangrove (Avicennia nitida) grow to 30–40 ft (9.1–12.2 m) tall and have a dark, almost black, trunk. The leaves of the Avicennia nitida often have salt crystals, and their roots poke out of the ground instead of growing into it. The flowers bloom during the spring and summer, and have white blossoms. The black mangrove do not grow in water like the red mangrove.

The white mangrove (Laguncularia racemose) grows on land in tidal areas. However, if they are near water, they can develop prop roots similar to those of the red and black mangroves. The white mangrove is able to excrete salt through the pores in its leaves which are thick and leathery to keep moisture in the tree.
