= Rosa Seamount =

Uplifted piece of the sea floor west of the Baja California

25°N 115°W

Rosa Seamount is a submarine mountain (seamount) west of the Baja California.
