= South American–Antarctic Ridge =

Mid-ocean ridge in the South Atlantic

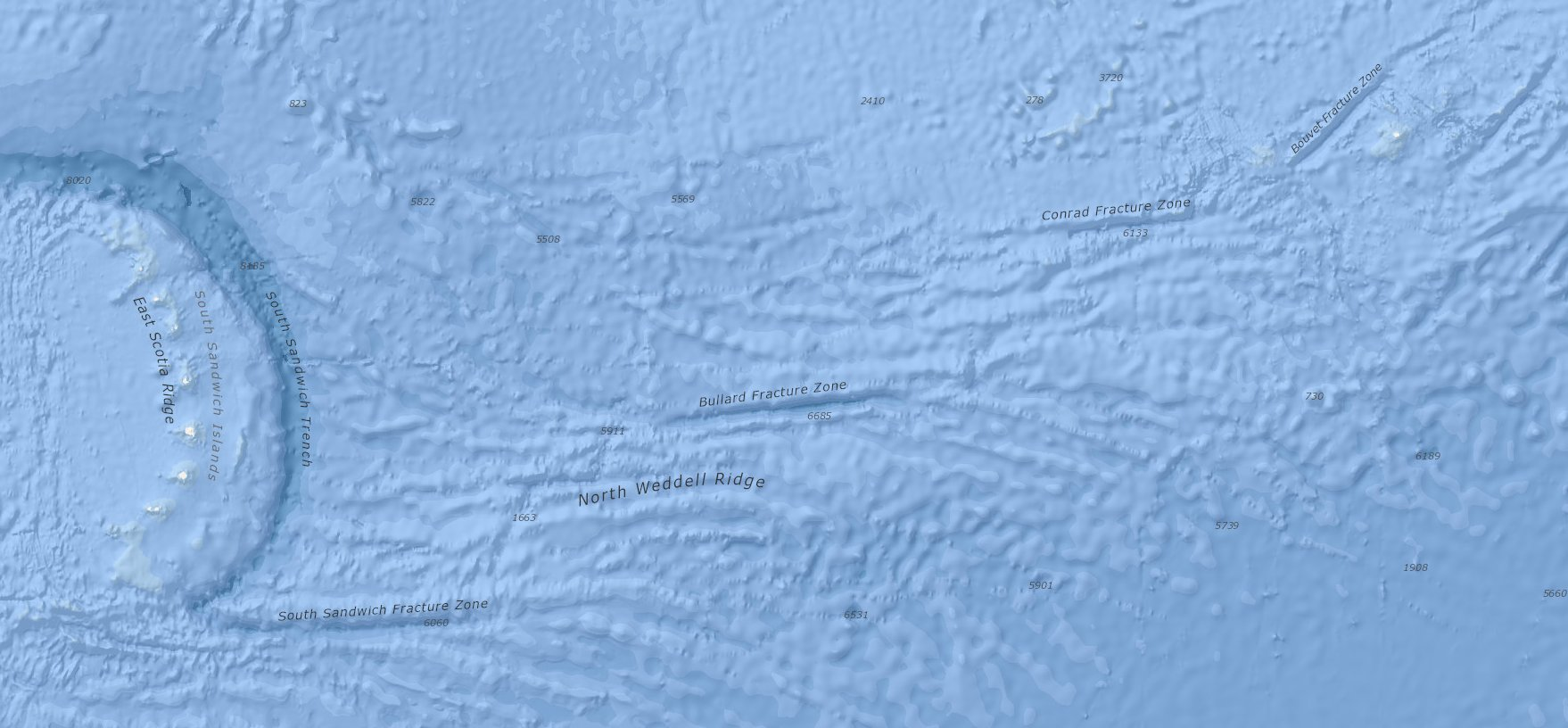
Bathymetric map of the South American-Antarctic Ridge

The South American–Antarctic Ridge or simply American-Antarctic Ridge (SAAR or AAR) (in Spanish: Dorsal Antártico-Americana) is the tectonic spreading center between the South American plate and the Antarctic plate. It runs along the sea-floor from the Bouvet triple junction in the South Atlantic Ocean south-westward to a major transform fault boundary east of the South Sandwich Islands. Near the Bouvet triple junction the spreading half rate is 9 mm/a (0.35 in/year), which is slow, and the SAAR has the rough topography characteristic of slow-spreading ridges.

== Geologic setting ==
The boundary between the South American and Antarctic plates can be divided into three parts of which the SAAR forms the eastern third:

The first stretches from the Chile triple junction in the Chile Trench at 46°S to the western Straits of Magellan at 52°S. Since 15 Ma, the oceanic crust of the Antarctic plate is being slowly subducted (20–24 mm/a (0.79–0.94 in/year)) under South America along this trench which is currently extending northward. In the central part, between the Straits of Magellan and the South Sandwich Trench, the two large continental plates are separated by the Scotia plate and a number of smaller plates east of it. During the past 40 Ma (or since the opening of the Drake Passage) the South Sandwich Trench has been migrating eastward due to the evolution of a back-arc basin, effectively consuming the SAAR.

The third eastern part, i.e. the 'SAAR proper', has two long and several shorter transform faults separating short north-to-south-directed ridge crests. The motion in the SAAR is currently c. 20 mm/a (0.79 in/year) westward but it was originally closer to north–south. It can be inferred, based on fracture zone topography and magnetic anomalies in the Weddell Sea, that this change in direction occurred during the Cretaceous and Cenozoic. The western part of the SAAR is dominated by the earthquake-intensive South Sandwich island arc, fore-arc, and trench. East of these structures the SAAR is composed of a series of north–south-oriented ridge crests, median valleys, and east–west-oriented transform faults. The major transform faults (from the east to the west) are the Konrad (displacement about 190 km),the Bullard (displacement more than 700 km), the Volcano (displacement about 100 km), and the southernmost South Sandwich (displacement up to 320 km) transform faults. The topography of the SAAR is extreme, with valleys reaching 1.5–2 km (0.93–1.24 mi) deeper than adjacent ridges in average and maximum depth exceeding 3 km. The SAAR is more shallow near the Bouvet triple junction. The Bouvet triple junction is between the American, African, and Antarctic lithospheric plates which has geographical coordinates of 55°S, 0°E.

North of the SAAR the South Sandwich plate consumes the South American plate at a rate of 65.8 mm/yr driven by back-arc extension. This fast subduction has broken off the southern part of the South American plate between the north-eastern end of the South Sandwich Arc and the Mid-Atlantic Ridge, leaving a separate microplate called 'Sur' (Spanish for 'South') north of the SAAR. The southern part of this Sur microplate has probably also been broken off and is subducting independently under the South Sandwich Arc.

== Tectonic evolution ==
The break-up of Gondwana began in the Mid- to Late Jurassic in what is today the Mozambique Basin east of Africa, whereas the South American and African plates started to break apart during the Early Cretaceous. Between these events neither the Mid-Atlantic Ridge nor the Bouvet triple junction existed and the SAAR formed a continuous ridge together with the Southwest Indian Ridge.

Around 106 Ma the eastern end of the Falkland Plateau separated from the Agulhas Bank, opening the South Atlantic which, however, remained an enclosed basin north of the Falkland Plateau until 85–83 Ma. Around 97 Ma the Northeast Georgia Rise (today north of the Scotia plate) and the Maud Rise (off Antarctica) were located next to the Agulhas Plateau (south of South Africa) where the Bouvet hotspot formed the Southern Ocean Large Igneous Province (112–93 Ma).

The Bouvet triple junction, today considered an R-F-F (ridge-fault-fault) type triple junction, was an R-R-R type before anomaly 28 (c. 64 Ma), which means that before the Scotia plate started to develop in the Mid-Tertiary, only ridges and transform faults separated Africa, Antarctica, and South America. The north–south motion of Antarctica relative to Africa and South America before anomaly 28 changed to a slow east–west clockwise motion around 60 Ma, an abrupt change coincident with change in triple junction configuration.

During the Late Paleocene–Early Eocene Antarctica and South America separated at a rate of only 0.3 cm/yr. The brief opening of small extensional basins south of Tierra del Fuego initiated the opening of the Drake Passage around 49 Ma after which the spreading rate increased eight-fold to 2.4 cm/yr. As the Antarctic—South American plate motion changed from north to north-west during this period, oceanic crust in the north-west Weddell Sea started to subduct on the eastern side of the Drake land bridge—the eastward migration of the South Sandwich Trench had begun.
