= Agulhas Passage =

Abyssal channel south of South Africa between the Agulhas Bank and Agulhas Plateau

Coordinates: 36°S 25°E

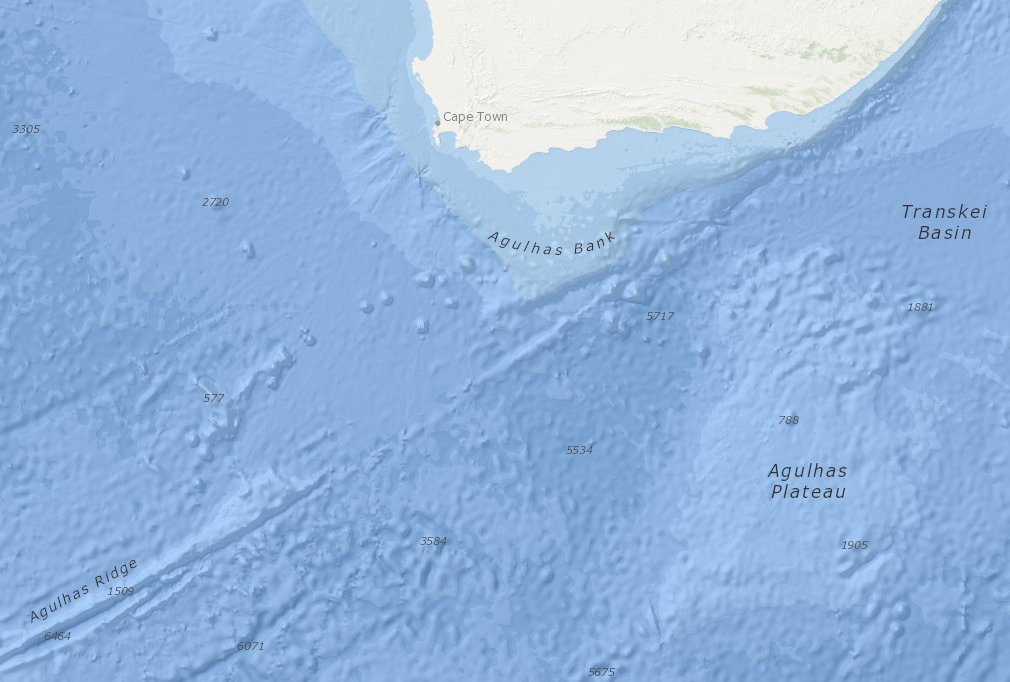
The Agulhas Passage is located between the Agulhas Bank and the Agulhas Plateau

The Agulhas Passage is an abyssal channel located south of South Africa between the Agulhas Bank and Agulhas Plateau. About 50 km (31 mi) wide, it connects the Natal Valley and Transkei Basin in the north to the Agulhas Basin in the south and is the only near-shore connection between the south-western Indian Ocean and South Atlantic Ocean.

== Geology ==
The formation of the Agulhas Passage was initiated by the Gondwana break-up some 160 million years ago (Ma) and the rifting of the Somali and Mozambique Basins, an event associated with the formation of the ocean floor in the Weddell Sea 147 Ma.

Between the Agulhas Bank and the Agulhas Passage the boundary between the Earth's crust and the mantle (the Moho) ascend from 25 to 14 km (15.5 to 8.7 mi) over 50 km (31 mi) which is normal for a continent-ocean boundary. The crustal thickness under the Agulhas Passage varies from 6 to 10 km (3.7 to 6.2 mi) which is equally normal for oceanic crust. It is possible, however, that volcanic flows from the Agulhas Plateau large igneous province (LIP) added crustal material to the Agulhas Passage (which is 160-120 Ma) during the LIP formation (100-80 Ma) and that the crust under the passage was originally thinner.

The sedimentary layers are very thin in the western Agulhas Passage, in places only 8 m (26 ft). In the central parts of the passage, in contrast, they can reach 1,300 m (4,300 ft) and form sediment drifts. The southern part is affected by thinning and erosion.

== Oceanography ==
The Agulhas Current, the western boundary current of the Indian Ocean, flows south through the Natal Valley, Transkei Basin, and Agulhas Passage into the south-east Atlantic Ocean where it retroflects back into the Indian Ocean as the Agulhas Return Current. In the Indian Ocean, the Agulhas Current is dissipated into a gyre which finally brings parts of the water mass back to the Natal Valley.

Since the development of the Antarctic Circumpolar Current in the Oligocene, Antarctic Bottom Water (AABW) flows both north through the Agulhas Passage and south of the Agulhas Plateau into the Transkei Basin and then into the Mozambique Basin.

North Atlantic Deep Water (NADW) flows north through the Agulhas Passage and then west of the Mozambique Ridge and through the Transkei Basin east of the ridge and then into the Indian Ocean. South of South Africa NADW is found close to a depth of 2,500 m (8,200 ft) where it transports 2.9 Sverdrups (million m^{3}/s) at a speed of 4 cm/s (1.6 in/s), resulting in an Agulhas Passage depleted of sediments at this level.

Antarctic Intermediate Water flows from Antarctica into the Indian Ocean from where it reaches Africa from the east. It flows south through the Agulhas Passage and then follows the Agulhas Current and retroflects back into the Indian Ocean.
