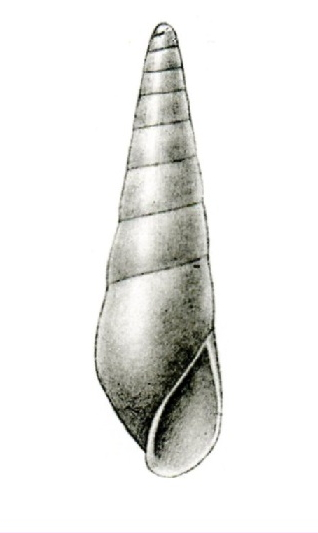
- Shell of Melanella jucunda (original image)

Scientific classification
- Kingdom: Animalia
- Phylum: Mollusca
- Class: Gastropoda
- Subclass: Caenogastropoda
- Order: Littorinimorpha
- Family: Eulimidae
- Genus: Melanella
- Species: M. jucunda

Binomial name
- Melanella jucunda (Thiele, 1925)

Synonyms
- Eulima jucunda Thiele, 1925

= Melanella jucunda =

Species of gastropod

Melanella jucunda is a species of sea snail, a marine gastropod mollusk in the family Eulimidae.

== Description ==
The shell measures 8.75 mm in height and 2.25 mm in diameter, while the height of the aperture is 2.9 mm.

(Original description in German) This species is characterised by its slender, smooth form, scarcely convex whorls, and the distinctive shape of the apex.

The very glossy, rather thin-walled shell consists of almost nine whorls. The first whorl is peculiarly rounded and conical in shape, whereas the following whorls are not convex; only the last few whorls are slightly convex. The body whorl is fairly high and only slightly convex below. The aperture is long and narrow, sharply angled above, and the apertural margin is rounded and produced at the middle on the right side; the margins are connected by a distinct callus.

== Distribution ==
This marine species occurs off the Agulhas Bank, South Africa.
