= Drillia lea =

Scientific classification
- Kingdom: Animalia
- Phylum: Mollusca
- Class: Gastropoda
- Subclass: Caenogastropoda
- Order: Neogastropoda
- Superfamily: Conoidea
- Family: Drilliidae
- Genus: Drillia
- Species: D. lea

Binomial name
- Drillia lea Thiele, 1925

Species of gastropod

Drillia lea is a species of sea snail, a marine gastropod mollusk in the family Drilliidae.

== Distribution ==
This marine species occurs off the Agulhas Bank, South Africa, at a depth of 155 m.
