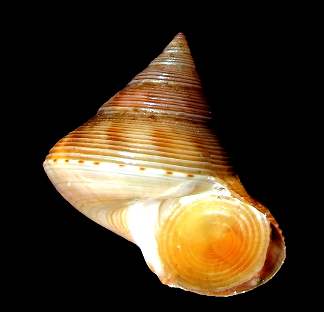
- Shell of Calliostoma perfragile

Scientific classification
- Kingdom: Animalia
- Phylum: Mollusca
- Class: Gastropoda
- Subclass: Vetigastropoda
- Order: Trochida
- Family: Calliostomatidae
- Genus: Calliostoma
- Species: C. perfragile

Binomial name
- Calliostoma perfragile G.B. Sowerby III, 1903

Synonyms
- Calliostoma (Calliostoma) perfragile Sowerby III, 1903

= Calliostoma perfragile =

Species of gastropod

Calliostoma perfragile is a species of sea snail, a marine gastropod mollusk in the family Calliostomatidae.

== Description ==
(Original description by G.B. Sowerby III) The size of the shell varies between 13 mm and 25 mm. The very thin, pale iridescent shell has a trochiform shape. The spire is acutely conical. The seven whorls are slightly convex and spirally ridged. There are 9 ridges on the penultimate whorl, rather narrow, the upper ones minutely granulated. The body whorl is angled at the periphery, with a slight keel, which is articulated with rather distant oblong yellowish brown spots. The base of the shell is rather convex, faintly lirate near the margin. The lirae become gradually more prominent towards the centre. The aperture is quadrangular and slightly oblique. The columella is very little curved, rather thick and truncated at the base.

The shell is top-shaped, with a conical spire and a somewhat flattened base. The spire whorls are slightly convex, with a shallowly indented suture. The periphery is rounded and angular but not keeled. The shell is sculpted with spiral cords, with the first two to three below the suture finely granular, while the others are smooth. The intervals between the cords often contain a fine spiral thread. The base is smoother, featuring several broad spiral cords around the umbilical region, which is closed. The aperture is nacreous (mother-of-pearl), and the operculum is circular and multi-spiral.

The coloration of the shell is predominantly pale orange-brown, resembling a biscuit tone, with a glossy, slightly iridescent surface. Under magnification, the spiral cords appear whitish, while the spaces between them are orange-brown. The periphery is marked by a spiral row of dash-like brown markings, and the base is a paler shade of the same orange-brown hue.

== Distribution ==
This marine species is endemic to South Africa and is primarily found on the Agulhas Bank, ranging from the Cape Canyon to southern Transkei. It may also occur off the coast of KwaZulu-Natal. This species inhabits depths between 100 and 350 meters.
