= Agulhas Front Marine Protected Area =

Offshore marine conservation area off the Eastern Cape in South Africa's EEZ

- Agulhas Front MPA location
- Location: Offshore of the Eastern Cape province, South Africa
- Nearest city: Port Elizabeth
- Coordinates: 36°51′S 25°27′E
- Area: 6,200 km^{2} (2,400 sq mi)
- Established: 2019
- Agulhas Front Marine Protected Area (Africa)

The Agulhas Front Marine Protected Area is an offshore conservation region in the exclusive economic zone of South Africa.

== History ==
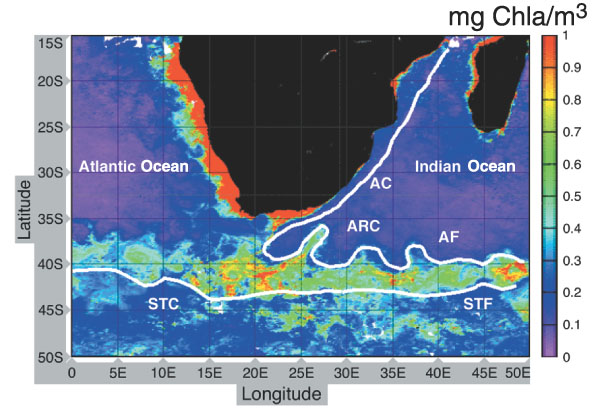
The Agulhas Return Current (ARC) meanders east along the Agulhas Front from the southern tip of Africa

The name refers to the retroflected warm Agulhas current contact front with the colder water further south.

== Purpose ==
A marine protected area is defined by the IUCN as "A clearly defined geographical space, recognised, dedicated and managed, through legal or other effective means, to achieve the long-term conservation of nature with associated ecosystem services and cultural values".

The area protects four deep sea habitat types of the Southwest Indian Ocean lower continental slope and the abyssal plain, and the main feeding habitat of the critically endangered leatherback turtles.

== Extent ==
This is an offshore MPA about 143 nautical miles south of Jeffreys Bay in the Eastern Cape, and deeper than 1800 m. The water column, seabed and subsoil inside the boundaries are all part of the MPA. The protected area of ocean is 6200 km^{2}

=== Boundaries ===
The boundaries of the MPA are:

- Northern boundary: A S36°28.000' E25°5.000' to B S36°24.000' E25°42.480'
- Eastern boundary: B S36°24.000' E25°42.480' to C S37°27.000' E25°50.000'
- Southern boundary: C S37°27.000' E25°50.000' to D S37°32.000' E25°10.620'
- Western boundary: D S37°32.000' E25°10.620' to A S36°28.000' E25°5.000'

=== Zonation ===
The entire MPA is a single restricted zone.

== Management ==
The marine protected areas of South Africa are the responsibility of the national government, which has management agreements with a variety of MPA management authorities, which manage the MPAs with funding from the SA Government through the Department of Environmental Affairs (DEA).

The Department of Agriculture, Forestry and Fisheries is responsible for issuing permits, quotas and law enforcement.

== Ecology ==
Marine ecoregions of the South African Exclusive Economic Zone: Agulhas Front Marine Protected Area is in the Southwest Indian ecoregion.

The MPA is in the warm temperate offshore Southwest Indian ecoregion beyond the continental shelf to the east of Cape Agulhas.

Three major habitats exist in the sea in this region, two of them distinguished by the nature of the substrate. The substrate, or base material, is important in that it provides a base to which an organism can anchor itself, which is vitally important for those organisms which need to stay in one particular kind of place. Rocky shores and reefs provide a firm fixed substrate for the attachment of plants and animals. Sandy beaches and bottoms are a relatively unstable substrate and cannot anchor many of the benthic organisms. Finally there is open water, above the substrate and clear of the kelp forest, where the organisms must drift or swim. Mixed habitats are also frequently found, which are a combination of those mentioned above.

Rocky reefs There are rocky reefs and mixed rocky and sandy bottoms. For many marine organisms the substrate is another type of marine organism, and it is common for several layers to co-exist.

The type of rock of the reef is of some importance, as it influences the range of possibilities for the local topography, which in turn influences the range of habitats provided, and therefore the diversity of inhabitants. Sandstone and other sedimentary rocks erode and weather very differently, and depending on the direction of dip and strike, and steepness of the dip, may produce reefs which are relatively flat to very high profile and full of small crevices. These features may be at varying angles to the shoreline and wave fronts. There are fewer large holes, tunnels and crevices in sandstone reefs, but often many deep but low near-horizontal crevices.

Sedimentary bottoms (including silt, mud, sand, shelly, pebble and gravel bottoms) Sedimentary bottoms at first glance appear to be fairly barren areas, as they lack the stability to support many of the spectacular reef based species, and the variety of large organisms is relatively low. The sediment may be being moved around by the water, to a greater or lesser degree depending on weather conditions, depth, and exposure of the area. This means that sessile organisms must be specifically adapted to areas of relatively loose substrate to thrive in them, and the variety of species found on an unconsolidated sedimentary bottom will depend on all these factors. Sedimentary bottoms have one important compensation for their instability, animals can burrow into the sand and move up and down within its layers, which can provide feeding opportunities and protection from predation. Other species can dig themselves holes in which to shelter, or may feed by filtering water drawn through the tunnel, or by extending body parts adapted to this function into the water above the sand.

The open sea The pelagic water column is the major part of the living space at sea. This is the water between the surface and the top of the benthic zone, where living organisms swim, float or drift, and the food chain starts with phytoplankton, the mostly microscopic photosynthetic organisms that convert the energy of sunlight into organic material which feeds nearly everything else, directly or indirectly. In temperate seas there are distinct seasonal cycles of phytoplankton growth, based on the available nutrients and the available sunlight. Either can be a limiting factor. Phytoplankton tend to thrive where there is plenty of light, and they themselves are a major factor in restricting light penetration to greater depths, so the photosynthetic zone tends to be shallower in areas of high productivity. Zooplankton feed on the phytoplankton, and are in turn eaten by larger animals. The larger pelagic animals are generally faster moving and more mobile, giving them the option of changing depth to feed or to avoid predation, and to move to other places in search of a better food supply.

=== Marine species diversity ===
==== Endemism ====
The MPA is in the warm temperate Agulhas ecoregion to the east of Cape Point which extends eastwards to the Mbashe River. There are a large proportion of species endemic to South Africa along this coastline.

== See also ==
Marine protected areas of South Africa

- List of protected areas of South Africa
- Marine protected areas of South Africa – Protected areas of coastline or ocean in the EEZ of South Africa
