= Agulhas Basin =

Oceanic basin south of South Africa

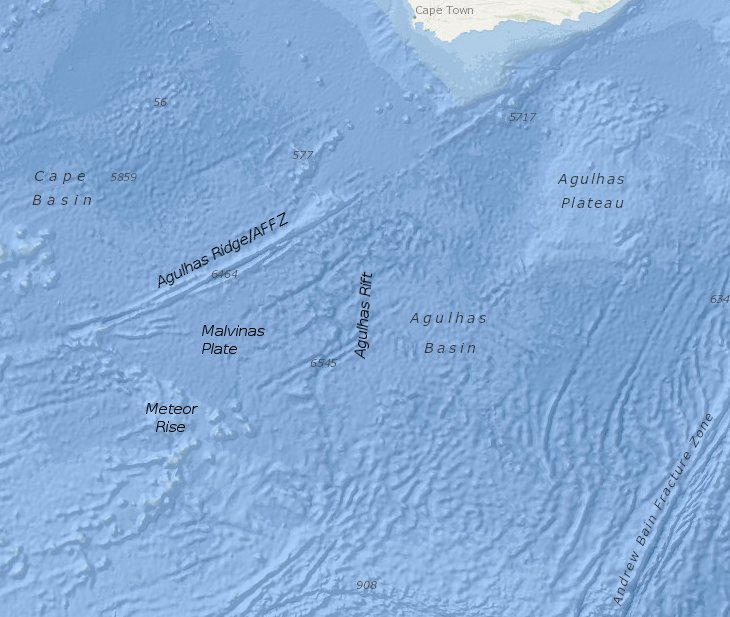
The Agulhas Basin and some of the bathymetric structures mentioned in the text

The Agulhas Basin is an oceanic basin located south of South Africa where the South Atlantic Ocean and south-western Indian Ocean meet. Part of the African plate, it is bounded by the Agulhas Ridge (part of the Agulhas–Falkland fracture zone) to the north and the Southwest Indian Ridge to the south; by the Meteor Rise to the west and the Agulhas Plateau to the east. Numerous bathymetric anomalies hint at the basin's dynamic tectonic history.

== Geology ==
In a Late Paleocene (59–56 Ma) reconstruction of the opening of the South Atlantic Ocean (i.e. the separation of South America and Africa during the Gondwana break-up) the Meteor Rise lies conjugate to the Islas Orcadas Rise (east of the Falkland Plateau). The separation of the Meteor Rise and the Islas Orcadas Rise marks the beginning of the formation of the Agulhas Basin.

The Agulhas Ridge extends from the northern tip of the Meteor Rise towards the Agulhas Bank south of South Africa. The ridge, however, ends abruptly in a small plateau at 40°S 15°E where it intersects a northeastward-trending spreading centre (the Agulhas Rift) that was abandoned during the Early Paleocene (61 Ma). The presence of a short-lived tectonic plate between these structures was first proposed by LaBrecque & Hayes 1979. They named it the Malvinas plate and proposed that it was active from 90 Ma until the spreading ceased in the Agulhas Basin at 65 Ma. The plate is located at a proto-Bouvet triple junction.

Marks & Stock 2001 found that Late Cretaceous (100–66 Ma) fracture zones generated on the Agulhas Rift do not align with those north of the Agulhas fracture zone and cannot therefore have been formed by the spreading of South America and Africa. Furthermore, magnetic anomalies on the Malvinas plate do not align with their conjugates on the African plate if the spreading rates and directions of South America and Africa are used as a guide. They also noted that the Agulhas fracture zone do not lay perpendicular to traces of the South America-Africa spreading north of it and cannot, therefore, have been generate by this spreading.

The Agulhas Rift is the abandoned Malvinas-Africa ridge crest. 97 Ma the plate boundary in the Agulhas Basin was reorganised when the Mid-Atlantic Ridge made an eastward jump. This brought the boundary towards the Agulhas Plateau where excessive volcanism was building a large igneous province. The inception of the Malvinas plate accompanied this shortening of the Agulas fracture zone. 61 Ma, the Malvinas plate was finally incorporated into the African plate when the Malvinas-Africa ridge was abandoned as the result of a westward ridge jump along the Agulhas–Falkland fracture zone. This second ridge jump reduced one of the most spectacular fracture zones in Earth's history — 1,200 km (750 mi) in length — to 180 km (110 mi).

== Oceanography ==
The Agulhas Current flows south along the African east coast. When it reaches the southern tip of Africa, it retroflects back into the Indian Ocean. At this retroflection it leaks warm core eddies known as Agulhas rings into the South Atlantic. This mesoscale anti-cyclonic rings feed the Atlantic meridional overturning circulation (AMOC) and are therefore believed to affect the global climate, although the connection between the leakage, AMOC, and climate change is still poorly understood. In the Agulhas basin, half of these rings are subdivided one or several times. A majority of the subdivided rings split at or near the bathymetric obstacles on the western side of the Agulhas Basin but almost a quarter of them also merge there either because of the obstacles or because of intense interaction with other rings.

Antarctic Bottom Water (AABW) originated in the Oligocene with the opening of the Drake Passage and the Tasmanian Seaway and resulted in the thermal insulation of Antarctica. AABW mixes with other masses in the Antarctic Circumpolar Current (ACC) to form the Circumpolar Deep Water (CDW). In the Agulhas Basin CDW flows northward and is deflect mostly westward by the Agulhas Ridge. A branch of CDW, however, enters the Cape Basin west of the ridge from where it flows west along the northern side of the ridge before being deflected north-east (along the Walvis Ridge) at the eastern end of the ridge. This long detour in the Cape Basin and mixing with North Atlantic Deep Water (NADW) results in warmer water than other CDW masses. Antarctic Intermediate Water (AAIW) flows above the CDW in the Agulhas Basin in an anti-cyclonic path (in contrast to the cyclonic path followed by CDW.)
