= Agulhas Return Current =

Ocean current in the southern Indian Ocean

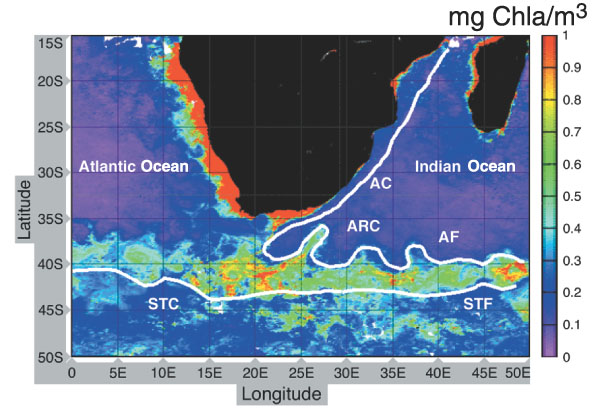
The Agulhas Return Current (ARC) meanders east from the southern tip of Africa

The Agulhas Return Current (ARC) is an ocean current in the South Indian Ocean. The ARC contributes to the water exchange between oceans by forming a link between the South Atlantic Current and the South Indian Ocean Current. It can reach velocities of up to 4 knots (7.4 km/h; 4.6 mph) and is therefore popular among participants in trans-oceanic sailing races.

== Oceanography ==
The ARC originates from the Agulhas Current, the western boundary current of the Indian Ocean, at the Agulhas Retroflection south of Africa and flows east along the Subtropical Front, roughly around 39°S, north of the Antarctic Circumpolar Current.

The Agulhas Current follows the continental shelf of the African east-coast, passes through the Agulhas Passage until it leaves the Agulhas Bank and reaches the Agulhas Basin south of South Africa. From there it retroflects almost completely back into the south Indian Ocean as the ARC, and only a smaller part, known as Agulhas leakage, is shed into the South Atlantic.

The water mass loses a lot of heat at the Agulhas Retroflection, up to 200 W/m^{3} (0.0076 hp/cu ft), while evaporation and precipitation change the composition of the upper layers. The ARC, therefore, has another composition than the Agulhas Current proper. It also loses velocity from 110 to 75 cm/s (43 to 30 in/s) and volume transport from 70 to 54 million m^{3}/s. Furthermore, all traces of Indian Tropical Surface Water are gone.

Having left the retroflection, the ARC meanders east between 36°S and 41°S. These meanders were described as Rossby waves in 1970 and are known to shed cold eddies equatorward and enhance the primary productivity at the Subtropical Front. The ARC makes a large, quasi-permanent northward meander around the Agulhas Plateau after which it loses more velocity and volume by leakage into the South Indian subtropical gyre. Over the Crozet Basin the last remnants of the ARC are gone. As it enters the Crozet Basin at 53°E, the transport of the ARC is 35 Sv, most of which is recirculated northward before reaching the Kerguelen-Amsterdam Passage. The current east of the Crozet Basin, at 66°E-70°E, is called the South Indian Ocean Current and lacks the distinctive features of the ARC.
