= Browns Bank Corals Marine Protected Area =

Marine conservation area on the continental slope of South Africa

- Browns Bank Corals MPA location
- Location: Western slopes of the Agulhas Bank, South Africa
- Coordinates: 36°00′S 19°40′E
- Area: 399 km^{2} (154 sq mi)
- Established: 2019
- Browns Bank Corals Marine Protected Area (Africa)

The Browns Bank Corals Marine Protected Area is an offshore conservation region in the exclusive economic zone of South Africa.

== History ==
The Browns Bank Corals Marine Protected Area was established in 2019.

== Purpose ==
A marine protected area is defined by the IUCN as "A clearly defined geographical space, recognised, dedicated and managed, through legal or other effective means, to achieve the long-term conservation of nature with associated ecosystem services and cultural values".

The Browns Bank Corals Marine Protected Area is specifically intended to protect cold-water corals and their ecosystems, along with the biodiversity and ecological processes associated with these ecosystems. It is a known spawning ground for hake fishery. Cold-water corals provide habitat for hake and other fish to reproduce.

== Extent ==
An offshore marine protected area (MPA) on the western edge of the Agulhas Bank, about 70 nautical miles south of Cape Agulhas in the 250 m to 400 m depth range. The MPA includes the water column, sea bed, and subsoil within the boundaries. The total sea area protected is about 300 km^{2} (120 sq mi). The entire MPA is a controlled area.

=== Boundaries ===
The MPA comprises three separate areas:

Browns Bank Corals 1 (north):

- Northern boundary: 35°33′S 19°11′E to 35°38.460′S 19°20′E
- Eastern boundary: 35°38.460′S 19°20′E to 35°42.780′S 19°20′E
- Southern boundary: 35°42.780′S 19°20′E to 35°38′S 19°11′E
- Western boundary: 35°38′S 19°11′E to 35°33′S 19°11′E

Browns Bank Corals 2 (central):

- Eastern boundary: 35°58′S 19°35′E to 35°58′S 19°41′E
- Southern boundary: 35°58′S 19°41′E to 36°8′S 19°53′E
- Western boundary: 36°8′S 19°53′E to 36°8′S 19°46.50′E
- Northern boundary: 36°8′S 19°46.50′E to 35°58′S 19°35′E

Browns Bank Corals 3 (south):

- Northern boundary: 36°22′S 20°0′E to 36° 22′S 20°2′E
- Northeastern boundary: 36°22′S 20°2′E to 36°32′S 20°13′E
- Southern boundary: 36°32′S 20°13′E to 36°32′S 20°10′E
- Southwestern boundary: 36°32′S 20°10′E to 36°24′S 20°0′E
- Western boundary: 36°24′S 20°0′E to 36°22′S 20°0′E

== Management ==
The management authorities manage the South African MPAs with funding from the South African government through the Department of Environmental Affairs (DEA). The Department of Agriculture, Forestry and Fisheries is responsible for issuing permits, quotas and law enforcement.

== Ecology ==
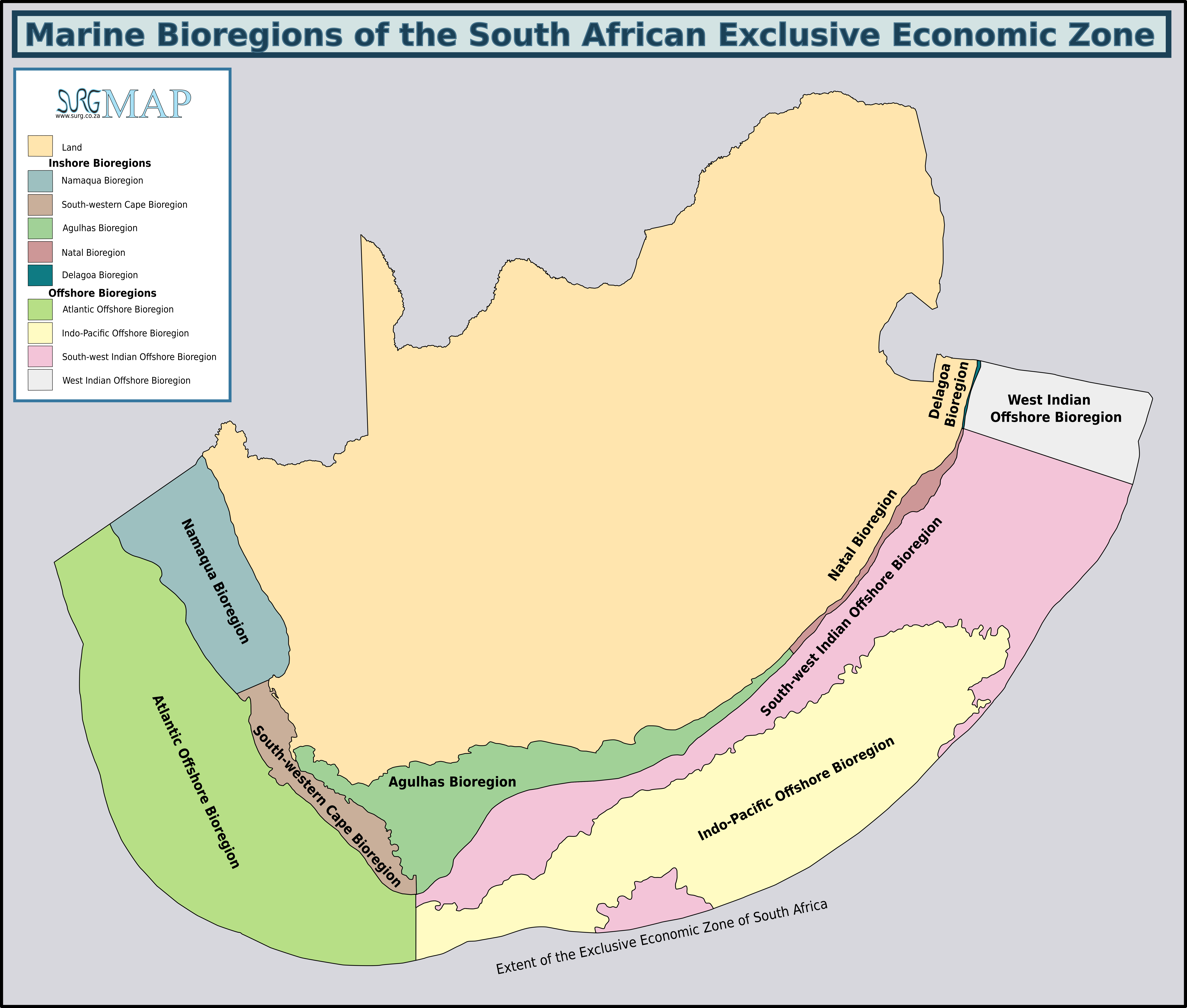
Marine bioregions of South Africa's exclusive economic zone (2004–2011): Browns Bank Corals Marine Protected Area is in the Atlantic offshore bioregion.

The MPA is in the cool temperate Atlantic offshore bioregion to the west of the continental shelf.

Three major habitats exist in the sea in this region, two of which are distinguished by the nature of the substrate. The substrate provides a base to which an organism can anchor itself. Some of these may have kelp forests, which reduce the effect of waves and provide food and shelter for some organisms. Sedimentary bottoms are a relatively unstable substrate and cannot anchor many of the benthic organisms. Finally, there is open water above the substrate and clear of the kelp forest. Mixed habitats of these are also frequently found.

=== Rocky reefs ===
There are rocky reefs and mixed rocky and sandy bottoms. For many marine organisms, the substrate is another type of marine organism, and it is common for several layers to co-exist.

The type of rock on the reef influences the range of possibilities for the local topography. Sandstone and other sedimentary rocks erosion depends on the direction of dip and strike and the steepness of the dip; they may produce reefs which are relatively flat to very high-profile and full of small crevices. These features may be at varying angles to the shoreline and wave fronts. There are fewer large holes, tunnels and crevices in sandstone reefs.

=== Marine species ===
In the water between the surface and the top of the benthic zone, there are living organisms on the food chain, starting with phytoplankton. In temperate seas, there are distinct seasonal cycles of phytoplankton growth based on the available nutrients and sunlight. Phytoplankton tend to restrict light penetrating to greater depths, so the photosynthetic zone tends to be shallower in areas of high productivity. Zooplankton feed on the phytoplankton and are eaten by larger animals.

== See also ==
Marine protected areas of South Africa

- List of protected areas of South Africa
- Marine protected areas of South Africa – Protected areas of coastline or ocean in the EEZ of South Africa
