= Northeast Georgia Rise =

Oceanic plateau in the South Atlantic Ocean

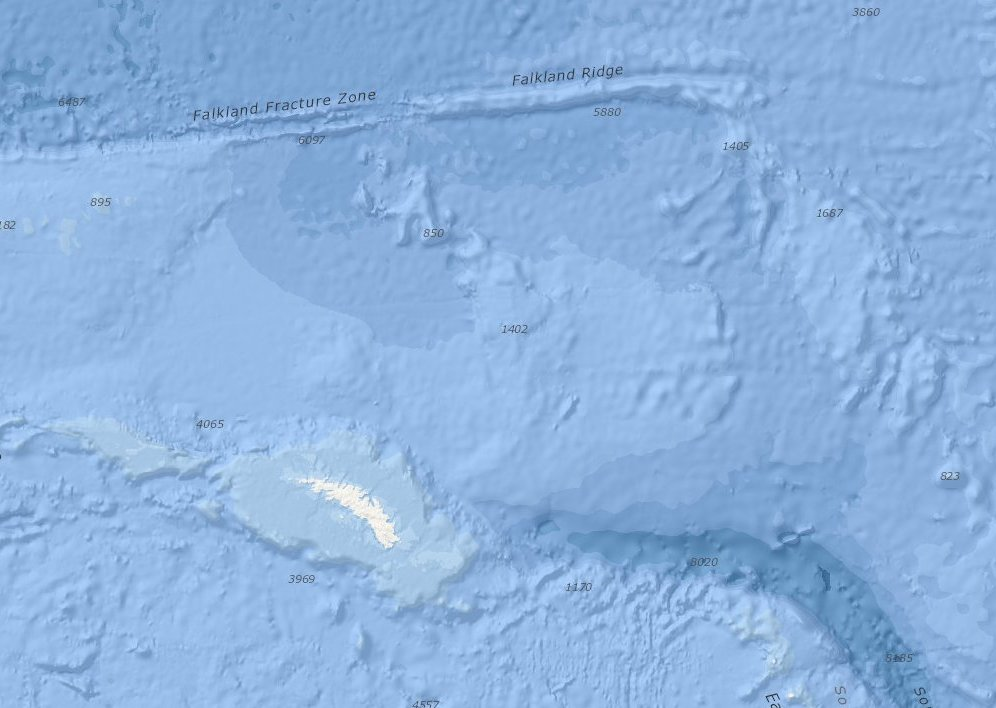
- Centred in the Georgia Basin, Northeast Georgia Rise is located northeast of South Georgia, west of Islas Orcadas Rise, south the Falkland Ridge and north of the South Sandwich Trench. North or Northwest Georgia Rise, barely visible just north of South Georgia, also affects ocean circulation but has a different tectonic history.

- Location within South Atlantic
- Summit depth: 2 km (1.2 mi)
- Height: 3 km (1.9 mi)
- Summit area: 400 km × 400 km (250 mi × 250 mi)

Location
- Location: Northeast of South Georgia Island
- Coordinates: 52.5°S 31.0°W
- Country: International

Geology
- Type: LIP, hotspot volcano
- Age of rock: 100 to 94 Ma

The Northeast Georgia Rise is an oceanic plateau located in the South Atlantic Ocean northeast of South Georgia Island and west of the Falkland Plateau.

== Bathymetry ==
The rise is separated from South Georgia Island by the Northeast Georgia Passage. The Georgia Basin surrounds the northern end of the rise. The Agulhas-Falkland fracture zone (AFFZ) stretches across the Atlantic north of the Northeast Georgia Rise. A group of small seamounts north of the rise are aligned with a gap in the AFFZ. East of this gap the AFFZ is a single ridge with an average height of 2,500 m (8,200 ft) but west of the gap the AFFZ is a double ridge with an average height of 1,500 m (4,900 ft).

On the eastern flank of the rise is a prominent ridge, the Soledad Ridge, about 1,000 m (3,300 ft) tall. It has the same orientation as the southeastern part of the rise. It is a basement-feature in which bottom-water have scoured a channel. Both the Northeast Georgia Rise and the Islas Orcadas Rise east of it, are seemingly dissected by transverse valleys that extend to the fracture zones of the Mid-Atlantic Ridge.

== Geology ==
=== LIP formation and dispersal ===
The Northeast Georgia Rise is made of oceanic crust that formed when Africa and South America spread apart after the Gondwana breakup. 100 Ma the Northeast Georgia Rise was part of the Agulhas Plateau-Northeast Georgia Rise-Maud Rise large igneous province (LIP) in what today is the southwesternmost Indian Ocean south of South Africa. This LIP, often called the southeast African LIP, formed at the triple junction where Gondwana passed over the Bouvet Hotspot and broke-up into Antarctica, South America, and Africa. This volcanism lasted until 94 Ma after which seafloor spreading detached the Northeast Georgia Rise and Maude Rise from the Agulhas Plateau and the Northeast Georgia Rise migrated westward to its current location and Maud Rise south towards the Weddell Sea.

Northeast Georgia Rise and the Agulhas Plateau were always located on different tectonic plates, the South American and African plates respectively. Because of this, these two plateaus can be used to reconstruct the movements of the two plates from the formation of the southeast African LIP.

=== Collision with South Georgia ===
Northeast Georgia rise collided with the South Georgia microcontinental block about 10 Ma which caused the uplift of this block and the creation of the present islands. The collision coincided with the termination of spreading at the West Scotia Sea and resulted in a bathymetric obstacle that still steers the Antarctic Circumpolar Current northward.

Two or more episodes of deformation have modified the topography of the ridge. Late Oligocene faulting coincides with the opening of the Scotia Sea; the western part of the Northeast Georgia Rise was uplifted by 0.5–1 km (0.31–0.62 mi) during the Neogene (23-3 Ma); the topography of the southwestern part of the rise may have formed by interaction with the advancing South Sandwich Trench or the South Sandwich block.

As a part of the Scotia plate, the South Georgia block has been moving eastward. It is possible that when Northeast Georgia Rise, with its thickened, buoyant crust, reached the convergent South American-Scotia margin, the rise stopped the South Georgia block, transformed it into a series of fault blocks, and forced the margin to relocate south of the South Georgia block — effectively making it part of the South American plate.

== Oceanography ==
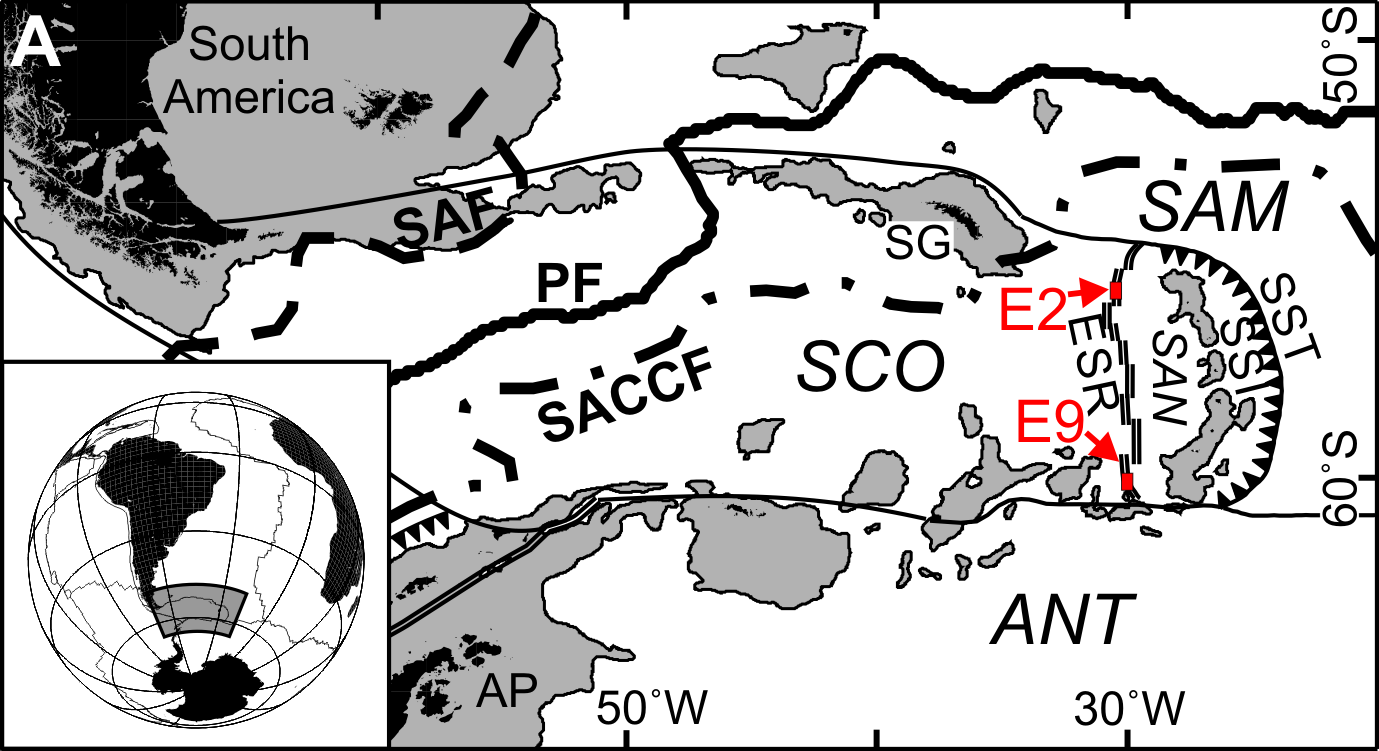
Fronts of the ACC in the Scotia Sea

In the Scotia Sea the Antarctic Circumpolar Current (ACC) is deflected north by the South Scotia Ridge. It then widens extensively before passing over the North Scotia Ridge. North of South Georgia the southern boundary of the ACC is retroflected around the Northeast Georgia Rise. The Southern Antarctic Circumpolar Current Front (SACCF) meanders across the Scotia Sea from the western shelf of the Antarctic Peninsula to the southwestern side of South Georgia. From there SACCF wraps the island anti-cyclonically, retroflects north of it, and flows across the Northeast Georgia Rise before looping cyclonically into the South Atlantic. The retroflection north of the island and across the rise shows a strong seasonal variability but SACCF remains constrained by these bathymetric obstacles.

Weddell Sea Deep Water (WSDW) circulates cyclonically in the Weddell Gyre from where it escapes through gaps in the South Scotia Ridge, such as the South Sandwich Trench. It then flows across the Scotia Sea which it can only escape through the Georgia Passage. WSDW can reach the Georgia Basin by two routes: either by circumnavigating the Northeast Georgia Rise on its eastern side or by passing through the Northeast Georgia Passage.
