= Agulhas Plateau =

Oceanic plateau in the Indian Ocean

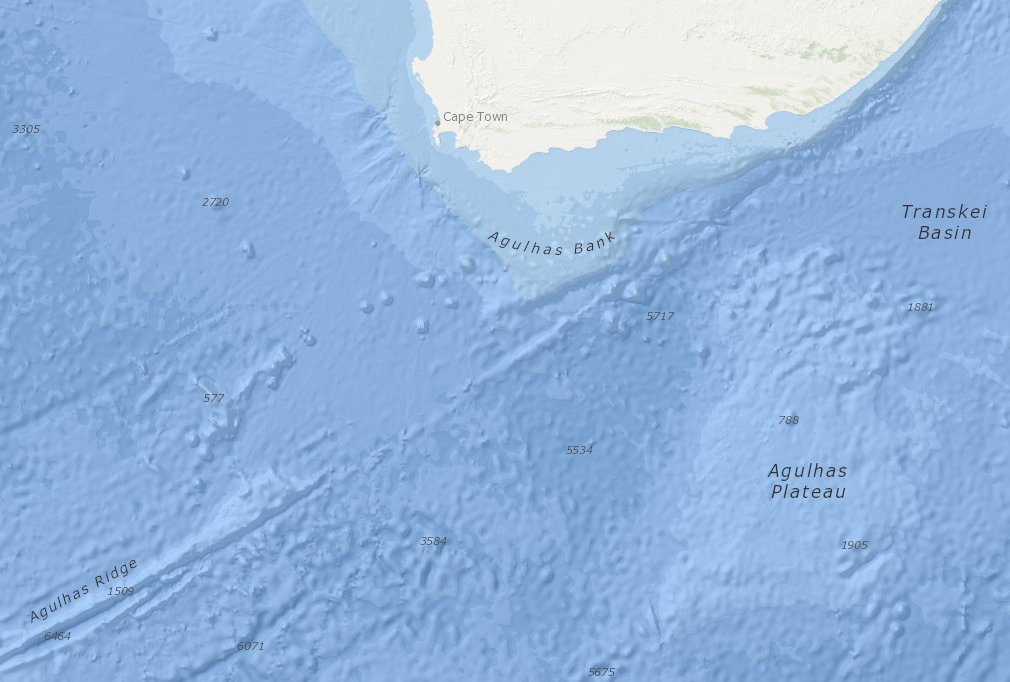
- The Agulhas Plateau is limited by the Agulhas Passage to the north; by the Agulhas Basin to the west; and by the Transkei Basin to the north-east.
- Summit depth: 2,500 m (8,200 ft)
- Height: 2,500 m (8,200 ft)
- Summit area: 300,000 km^{2} (120,000 sq mi)

Location
- Location: 500 km (310 mi) south of Africa
- Coordinates: 39°S 26°E
- Country: South Africa/International

Geology
- Type: LIP, hotspot volcano
- Age of rock: 100 to 94 Ma

The Agulhas Plateau is an oceanic plateau located in the south-western Indian Ocean about 500 km (310 mi) south of South Africa. It is a remainder of a large igneous province (LIP), the Southeast African LIP, that formed 140 to 95 million years ago (Ma) at or near the triple junction where Gondwana broke-up into Antarctica, South America, and Africa. The plateau formed 100 to 94 Ma together with Northeast Georgia Rise and Maud Rise (now located near the Falkland Island and Antarctica respectively) when the region passed over the Bouvet hotspot.

== Geology ==
=== History of research ===
The Agulhas Plateau is one of the key structures in the reconstruction of the Gondwana break-up. It was first mapped in 1964 (i.e. part of what would become the Heezen-Tharp map of the world's ocean floor finally published in 1977), but its crustal composition, paleoposition, and geological origin remained enigmatic for decades.

The boundary between the Earth's crust and the mantle (the Moho) rises from 25 to 15 km (15.5 to 9.3 mi) between the Agulhas Bank (south of South Africa) and the Agulhas passage (south of the bank), typical for a continent-ocean transition. The Agulhas Passage consists of 120-160 Ma-old oceanic crust, whereas the 100-80 Ma-old Agulhas Plateau rises 2.5 km (1.6 mi) above the surrounding ocean floor while the Moho dips to between 20–22 km (12–14 mi) below it.

The morphology of the basement below the northern plateau is irregular, suggestive of an oceanic origin. The basement below the southern plateau, however, is smooth, which has been interpreted as indicative of a possible continental origin. ODP drilling at the Northeast Georgia Rise (north-east of South Georgia) indicated that the Agulhas Plateau and the rise formed together and must have an oceanic origin. Some researchers, nevertheless, remained convinced that the plateau was at least partly of continental origin. Over several decades analyses of geoid, MAGSAT, gravitational, and magnetic anomalies data collected across the plateau were used as arguments for both an oceanic and a continental origin.

Uenzelmann-Neben, Gohl and Ehrhardt could finally present seismic evidence that showed that the Agulhas Plateau was a large igneous province (LIP) made entirely of oceanic crust.

=== Large igneous province ===
The Agulhas Plateau is the remaining core of a large-scale volcanism that started in the Lazarev Sea (today off Antarctica) with the emplacement of the Karoo basalts 184 Ma. This process continued with the formation of the Mozambique Ridge (MOZR)-Agulhas Plateau LIP which was active in phases between 140 and 95 Ma. This formation coincides with the formation of the Kerguelen-Heard Plateau. The MOZR formed 140-122 Ma and must have reached its maximum extent about 120 Ma while the spreading zone between Africa and Antarctica was located under its eastern flank.

The South Atlantic Ocean started to open-up 130 Ma when the Falkland Plateau moved westwards along what was becoming the Agulhas-Falkland fracture zone (AFFZ). In the wake of the Falkland Plateau, during the Cretaceous quiet interval, first the Natal Valley formed, then the Transkei Basin, a process completed 90 Ma.

The process continued with the formation of the Agulhas Plateau—Northeast Georgia Rise—Maud Rise LIP (AP-NEGR-MR LIP or Southeast African LIP) at the end of the Early Cretaceous (100 Ma). The AP-NEGR-MR LIP formed when the region passed over the Bouvet hotspot. About 94 Ma the main eruption ended and seafloor spreading detached the NEGR and MR from the AP. Before this separation the AP-NEGR-MR LIP consisted of 1.2×10^{6} km^{2} (0.46×10^{6} sq mi) of oceanic plateau.

The MOZR and AP are today connected by a crustal corridor, the Transkei Rise, which rises 500–1,000 m (1,600–3,300 ft) above the surrounding ocean floor. This rise is thought to be the product of continuous but reduced volcanism during the 20 Ma period between the formation of the MOZR-AP LIP and AP-NEGR-MR LIP.

Volcanic layers on the southern Agulhas Plateau where later overlaid by sediments in which traces of either sub-areal or shallow marine erosions indicate that the plateau was near sea-level.

Southern Africa experienced two periods of erosion and denudation during the Early and Mid-late Cretaceous. The driving forces behind these events is poorly understood, but both periods coincide with LIP formation: the first period (130-120 Ma) coincides with the initial stages of the Gondwana break-up and the second period (100-90 Ma) with the formation of the Agulhas LIP. Somehow, these two events led to the Mesozoic uplift of southern Africa.

== Oceanography ==
The Antarctic Bottom Water (AABW) flows north-eastward into the Transkei Basin throw the Agulhas Passage and across the southern margin of the Agulhas Plateau. AABW then flows into the Mozambique Basin. Palaeoceanographic evidences show the presence of proto-AABW during the Oligocene (34-23 Ma) and that proto-AABW was strengthened 15 Ma and deflected southward by the increased flow of North Atlantic Deep Water (NADW). NADW flows north of the Agulhas Plateau through the Agulhas Passage into the Transkei Basin where it splits in two and continues into the Natal valley and the Indian Ocean.

Antarctic Intermediate Water (AAIW) originates at the water surface around Antarctica and flows northward into the Indian Ocean. At 1,500 m (4,900 ft), it then flows westward along the African east-coast and the Agulhas Bank before retroflecting eastward across the Agulhas Plateau into the Indian Ocean.

The Agulhas Current, the western boundary current of the Indian Ocean, retroflects abruptly into the Indian Ocean south-west of South Africa and becomes the Agulhas Return Current. Over the Agulhas Plateau the return current forms a major northward loop to bypass it.

== See also ==
- African superswell
