= Maud Rise =

Oceanic plateau in the Southern Ocean

The Maud Rise (66°S 3°E) is an oceanic plateau, which rises, at its shallowest, to depths of about 1,000 meters. It is located in the Weddell Sea in the Southern Ocean. Its name was approved by the Advisory Committee for Undersea Features in June 1987.

== Geology ==
Maud Rise formed part of the south-eastern African large igneous province (LIP), which developed south of Africa 100 to 94 million years ago (Ma). This LIP first formed 140-122 Ma east of South Africa where the Mozambique Ridge is now located. There it reached a maximum extent around 120 Ma when the African-Antarctic spreading zone was located below its eastern flank. Astrid Ridge was possibly part of this LIP as well.

The LIP formation then continued intermittently until it finally reached its maximum extent south of South Africa 100 Ma. This volcanism ended 94 Ma, after which seafloor spreading divided the LIP into the Agulhas Plateau (south of South Africa), Northeast Georgia Rise (near South Georgia Island off South America), and Maud Rise.

== See also ==
- Weddell Polynya
