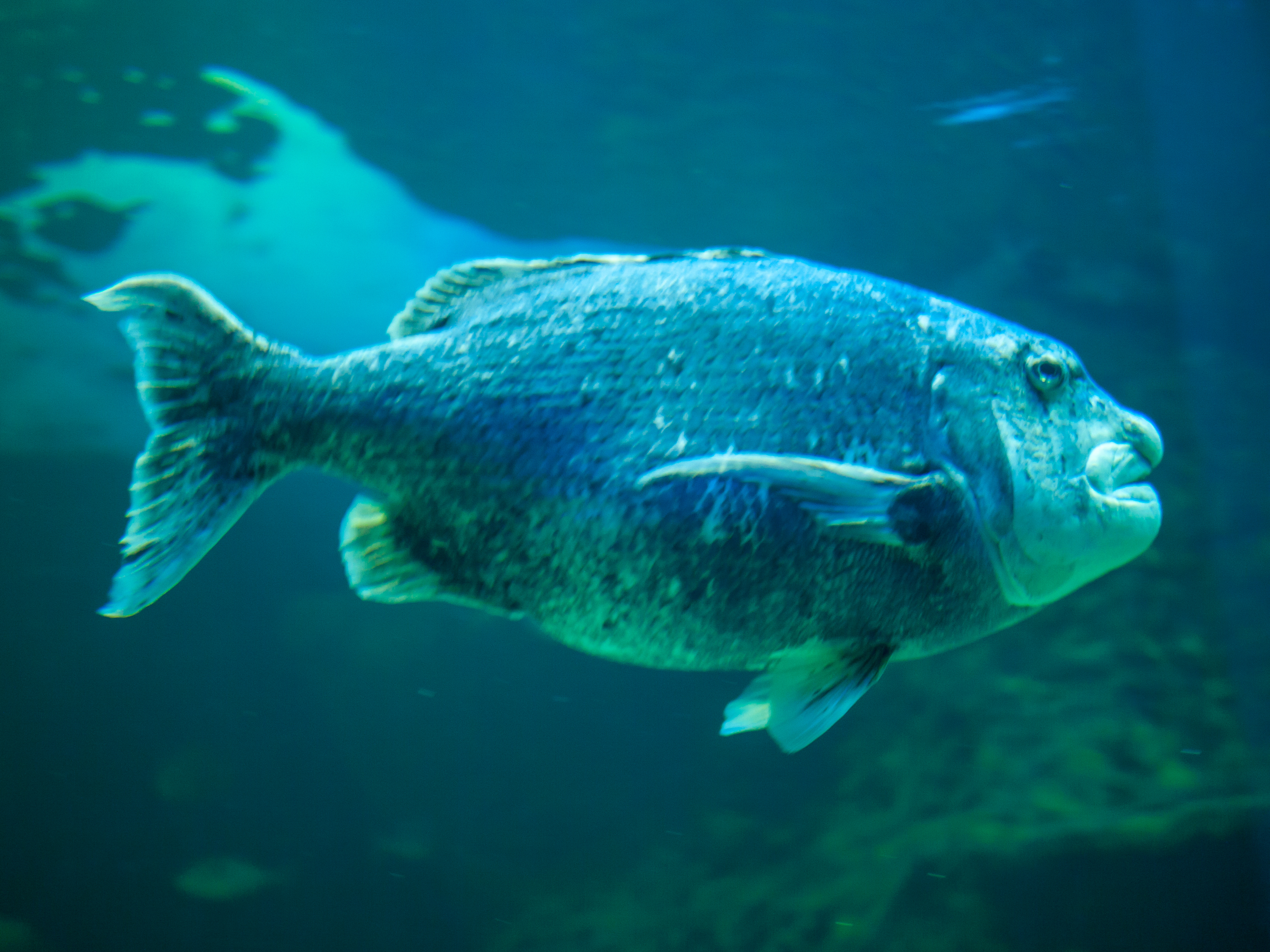

Conservation status
- Vulnerable (IUCN 3.1)

Scientific classification
- Kingdom: Animalia
- Phylum: Chordata
- Class: Actinopterygii
- Order: Acanthuriformes
- Family: Sparidae
- Genus: Cymatoceps; Smith, 1938
- Species: C. nasutus

Binomial name
- Cymatoceps nasutus (Castelnau, 1861)

Synonyms
- Chrysophrys nasutus Castelnau, 1861; Pagrus nigripinnis Boulenger, 1903

= Black musselcracker =

Species of fish

The black musselcracker (Cymatoceps nasutus) is a species of marine ray-finned fish belonging to the family Sparidae, which includes the seabreams and porgies. This species is the only species in the monospecific genus Cymatoceps. It is endemic to South Africa.

== Taxonomy ==
The black musselcracker was first formally described as Chrysophrys nasutus in 1861 by the French naturalist Francis de Laporte de Castelnau with its type locality given as Table Bay near Cape Town in South Africa. In 1938 James Leonard Brierley Smith reclassified this species in the monotypic genus Cymatoceps. This taxon is placed in the family Sparidae within the order Spariformes by the 5th edition of Fishes of the World. Some authorities classify this genus in the subfamily Sparinae, but the 5th edition of Fishes of the World does not recognise subfamilies within the Sparidae.

== Etymology ==
The black musselcracker has the generic name Cymatoceps which is a combination of cymatos, meaning "swelling" or "bump", and ceps, meaning "head". This was not explained by Castelnau but it is thought to be an allusion to the large fleshy, protuberance on the snouts of the larger adults. The specific name nasutus means "large-nosed", also a reference to the large fleshy, protuberance on the snout.

== Description ==
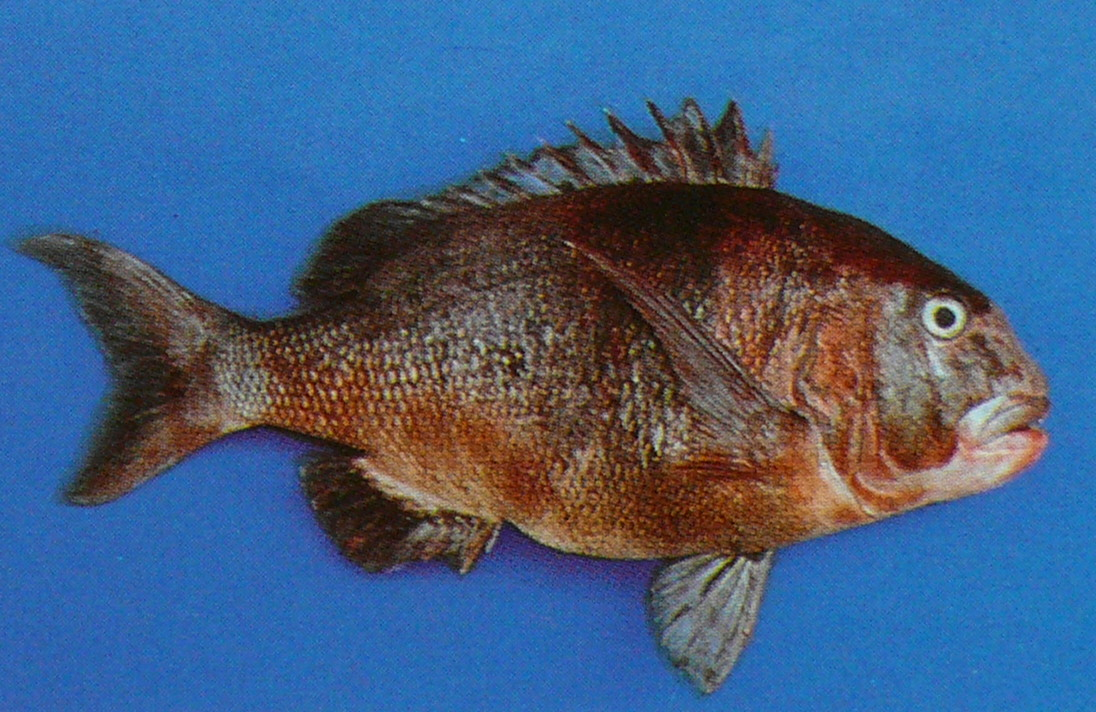

The black musselcracker is distinguished from other genera in the Sparidae by having scales on the area between the eyes and on the bases of the soft rayed parts of the dorsal and anal fins. The flange on the preoperculum is partially covered with scales. The dorsal fin is supported by 12 spines and 10 soft rays while the anal fin is supported by 3 spines and 9 soft rays. The body is moderately deep and compressed, its standard length being between 2.3 and 2.5 times its depth. The dorsal profile of the head is gently sloping but in large adults develop a fleshy process on the snout and a hump before the eyes. The scales are ctenoid, larger below the lateral line than above it. The overall colour of adults is dull dark grey with the chin and belly being bright white> The juveniles are dark greenish brown in colour on the body with irregular white mottling. This species has a maximum published total length of 150 cm (59 in) and a maximum published weight of 34.4 kg (76 lb).

== Distribution and habitat ==
The black musselcracker is endemic to South Africa where it is found from northern KwaZulu-Natal to False Bay. It has been reported from Maputo Bay in Mozambique but it is unknown from line or trap fisheries in Maputo. It is found at depths between 1 and 80 m (3 ft 3 in and 262 ft 6 in) and occurs in shallow rocky areas, rarely entering estuaries.

== Biology ==
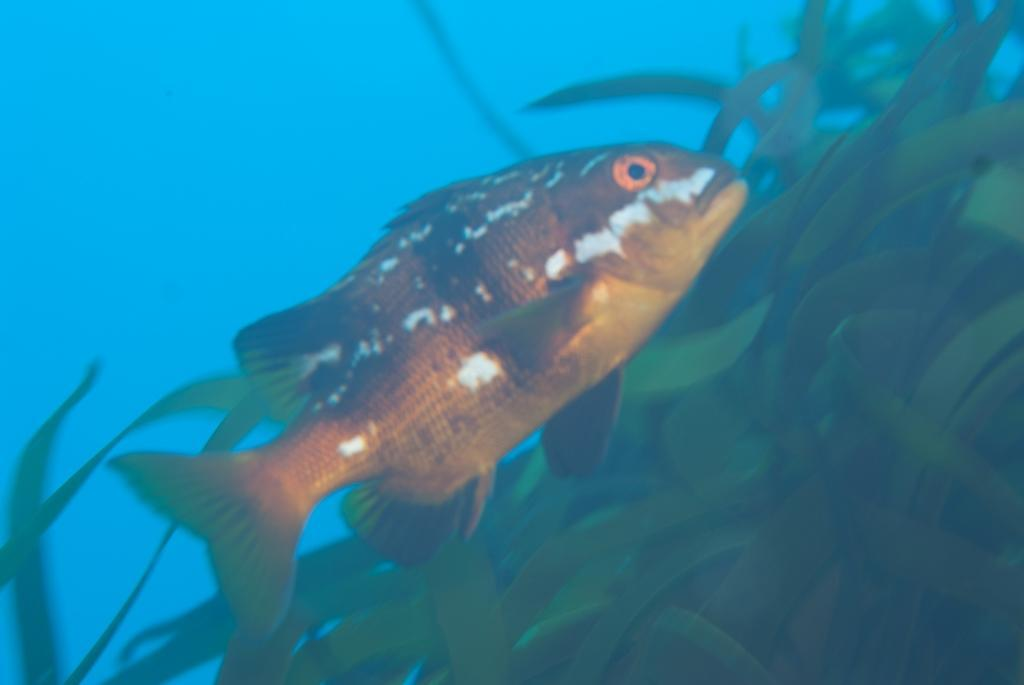
Juvenile

Black musselcrackers are solitary and have been recorded preying on a wide variety of prey, mainly molluscs, crustaceans, and echinoderms as adults. The adults are found on deeper topographically varied reefs in both inshore and offshore waters. The juveniles prefer shallower reefs, just below the low tide mark at depths of less than 10 m (33 ft). Tagging studies have revealed that both juveniles and sub-adults are very sedentary and, that the limited data obtained on the movements of larger adults suggests that there is an easterly movement up the South African coast. Studies of the otoliths of this species show that it grows slowly and has a long life, with 45.5 years being the age of the oldest fish recorded.

This species is thought to be a protogynous hermaphrodite and, off the Eastern Cape, spawning occurs between May and October. Sexually mature adults are not found in the Western Cape suggests that the adults move east to the Eastern Cape and KwaZulu-Natal. The smallest females found which was reproductively active had a fork length of 53 cm (21 in) and the age at which 50% of the fish are sexually mature is thought to be 10 years old. They are thought to change sex from female to male at a fork length of 70 cm (28 in), around 18 years of age, and fish with fork lengths in excess of 95 cm (37 in) are all male.

== Fisheries and conservation ==
The black musselcracker is a popular sport fish in South Africa. Because it is eagerly sought after, this species experiences a lot of over harvesting, which diminishes its chances of a stable population. The reason that black musselcracker is vulnerable to over harvesting is mainly because they have a slow growth rate, which means that they are most likely being harvested before they are old enough to reproduce.

As a result of over harvesting the black musselcracker, there are now fishing regulations to protect this species. The primary rule is that each fisherman is allowed only one fish, minimum length of 50 centimeters, per day. Because of these new regulations, in some regions of South Africa, black musselcracker populations are on the rise.
