= Bouvet triple junction =

Meeting point of three tectonic plates

Coordinates: 54°17′30″S 1°5′0″W

Seafloor model around the Bouvet triple junction

Approximate surface projection on South Atlantic Ocean of the Bouvet triple junction where the white lines of the three mid-oceanic ridges intercept. Approximate surface projection on oceans of fracture zones is shown. Key: Fracture zones; Probable extension of Fracture zones; Fracture zone of relevance to article; Probable extension relevant to article; Mid-oceanic ridges; Sea; Land; Clicking on the rectangle icon enables full window and mouse-over with text detail.

The Bouvet triple junction is a geologic triple junction of three tectonic plates located on the seafloor of the South Atlantic Ocean. It is named after Bouvet Island, which lies about 250 km (160 mi) to the east. The three plates which meet here are the South American plate, the African plate, and the Antarctic plate. The Bouvet triple junction appears to be a R-R-R type, that is, the three plate boundaries which meet here are mid-ocean ridges: the Mid-Atlantic Ridge (MAR), the Southwest Indian Ridge (SWIR), and the South American-Antarctic Ridge (SAAR). However, the junction is actually slightly more complex and in transition.

== Transform valleys ==
There are two prominent transform valleys in the area: Conrad transform and Bouvet transform. Both transforms are named as fracture zones. Conrad transform is named after USNS Robert D. Conrad (T-AGOR-3). Bouvet Island is the highest point on the southern wall of the Bouvet transform and was formed 2.0–2.5 million years ago.

== Development ==
There has been complex development over time with the first Bouvet triple junction being formed about 119–124 Ma, the second about 93–105 Ma, and the third at 25–30 Ma. Up to 10 million years ago this third junction of the Mid-Atlantic Ridge and the two deep transform valleys of Conrad and Bouvet met in one point. Thus the triple junction was of the ridge-fault-fault (RFF) type. Conrad transform, known as the Conrad fracture zone, stretching to the west, connected the end of the Mid-Atlantic Ridge to the South American-Antarctic Ridge. Bouvet transform, known as the Bouvet fracture zone, linked it to the Southwest Indian Ridge on the eastern side, and this is known to be the oldest part of the current triple junction at 8 Ma.

Currently the Conrad transform and Bouvet transform are no longer connected to each other. The Mid-Atlantic Ridge is retreating northward, at a rate of 11 mm/a (0.43 in/year). New spreading sections of the South American-Antarctic Ridge and the Southwest Indian Ridge are growing northward from the eastern end of Conrad transform and the western end of Bouvet transform respectively, striving for the shifting triple point. Thus the Mid-Atlantic Ridge is opening like a zipper. The new spreading sections are somewhat unusual:

- One new spreading section of the South American-Antarctic Ridge is not perpendicular to Conrad fault, violating the perpendicular pattern of alternating spreading ridges and transform faults generally seen on slowly spreading oceanic ridges.
- The new part of the Southwest Indian Ridge is masked by the recently formed Spiess Seamount, which is also known as Spiess Ridge, and this means that it is not possible to classify the junction definitely as R-R-R as it may still be R-F-F transitioning to R-R-R, being for the last 1 Ma ridge–fault–ridge, (R-F-R). This volcanic seamount is now more than 2 million years old, and is the highest point in the area after Bouvet Island. Spiess Seamount was named after Captain Fritz Spieß of the German Meteor expedition of 1926.
