= Agulhas Bank =

Broad southernmost part of the African continental shelf

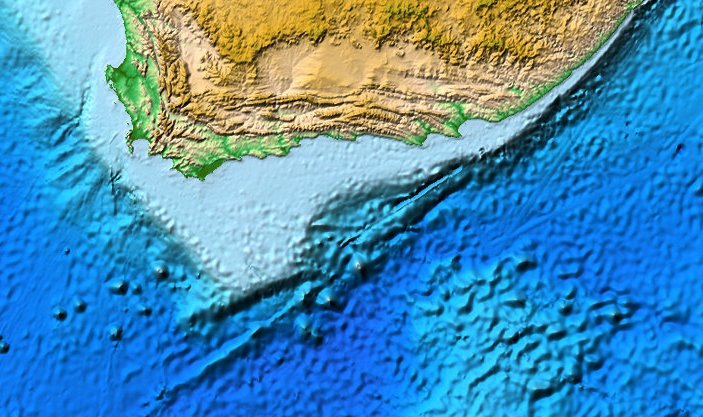
- Map of the Agulhas Bank centred on the Outeniqua Basin

Ecology
- Realm: Temperate Southern Africa

Geography
- Area: 116,000 km^{2} (45,000 mi^{2})
- Country: South Africa
- Elevation: -50 to -200 m
- Coordinates: 34°42′33.1″S 22°28′12.4″E
- Oceans or seas: Atlantic Ocean, Indian Ocean

The Agulhas Bank (/əˈɡʌləs/, from Portuguese for Cape Agulhas, Cabo das Agulhas, "Cape of Needles") is a broad, shallow part of the southern African continental shelf which extends up to 250 km (160 mi) south of Cape Agulhas before falling steeply to the abyssal plain.

It is the ocean region where the warm Indian Ocean and the cold Atlantic Ocean meet. This convergence leads to treacherous sailing conditions, accounting for numerous wrecked ships in the area over the years. However, the meeting of the oceans here also fuels the nutrient cycle for marine life, making it one of the best fishing grounds in South Africa.

== Extent and characteristics ==
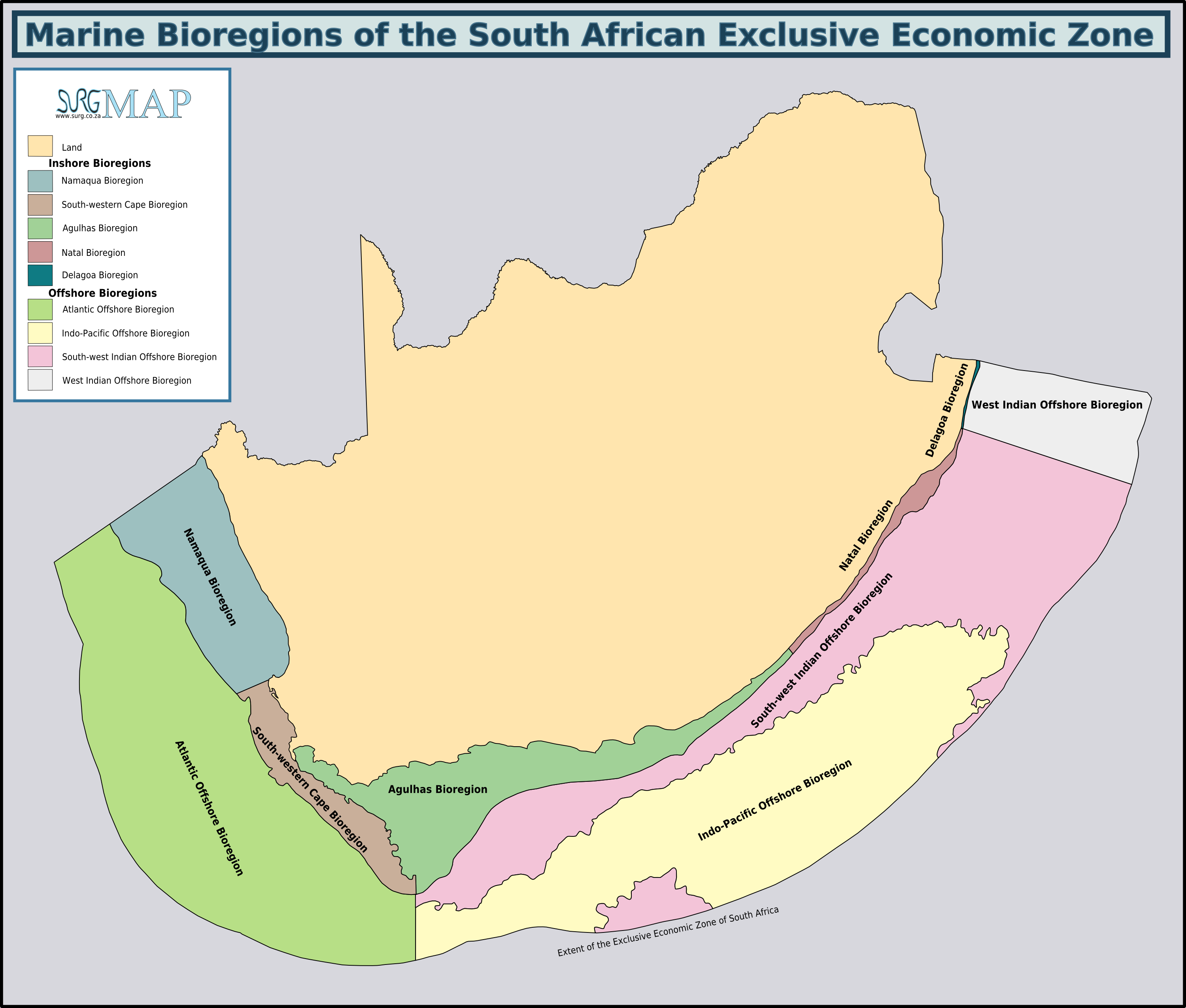
The South African marine bioregions from the 2004 classification.

South African marine ecoregions from the 2011 classification

The Agulhas Bank stretches approximately 800 km (500 mi) along the African coast, from off Cape Peninsula (18°E) to Port Alfred (26°E), and up to 250 km (160 mi) from it. The bank slopes down relatively steeply from the coast to about 50 m (160 ft) deep and reaches 200 m (660 ft) before dropping very steeply to 1,000 m (3,300 ft) on its southern edge. The shelf spans an area of 116,000 km^{2} (45,000 sq mi) with a mean depth slightly over 100 m (330 ft). It is entirely within the exclusive economic zone of South Africa.

The National Spatial Biodiversity Assessment 2004 recognised 34 biozones nested within 9 bioregions (of which four were offshore). The National Biodiversity Assessment of 2011 replaced these ecozones and biozones with the terms ecoregions and ecozones. In 2011, the Agulhas Ecoregion was divided into four distinct ecozones: Agulhas inshore, Agulhas inner shelf, Agulhas outer shelf, and Agulhas shelf edge. 33 different benthic habitats types were identified on the Agulhas Bank.

Dozens of warm temperate reefs along the coast of the Agulhas Ecoregion span from 5–30 m (16–98 ft) below sea level. Many rocky sub-tidal reefs are of aeolianite or sandstone origin, but granite, quartzite and siltstone reefs are also present. The Agulhas reefs are heterogeneous and include several possible different sub-types. Some of these reefs are within protected areas, but only a few areas included prohibit fishing.

== Oceanography ==
The Agulhas Bank is a natural boundary between ocean currents from the Atlantic Ocean, Indian Ocean, and Southern Ocean, resulting in some of the most turbulent waters found in the world's oceans.

=== Agulhas Current ===
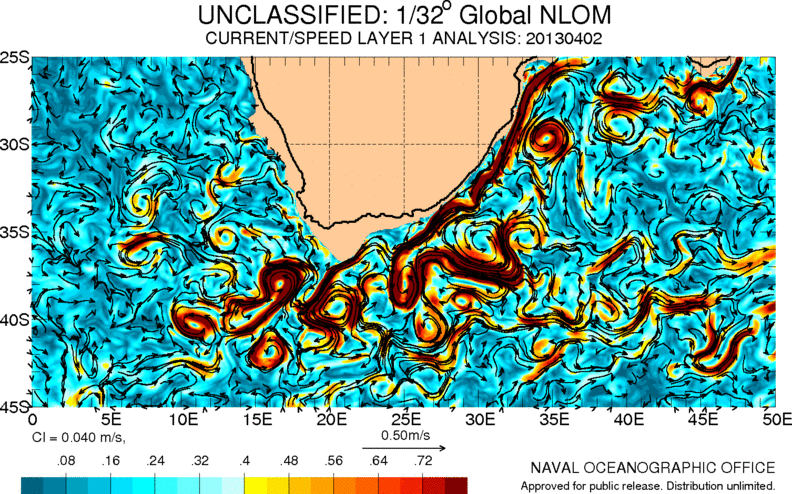
Eddies of the Agulhas Current meanders past the Agulhas Bank leaking warm and salty water into the South Atlantic before retroflecting back into the Indian Ocean

The Agulhas Current flows south along the eastern African coast and along the south-eastern edge of the bank. It then retroflects back into the Indian Ocean south-west of the bank. This retroflection results in intense eddy activities such as meanders, eddies, and filaments. In the upper watercolumn, the eponymous "Agulhas rings" or "Agulhas eddies" move warm and salty water into the large South Atlantic gyre, ultimately exporting it to the tropics; while in lower ocean layers water is transported in the opposite direction.

==== Upwellings ====
Cyclonic eddies are another source of edge upwelling, notably occurring to the west of Port Elisabeth. Plumes of warm surface water migrate onto the bank along its eastern edge, providing subtropical surface water from the Indian Ocean to the region. In summer, easterly winds can intermittently drive coastal upwelling along the southern South African coast. The Agulhas Bank region is dominated by westerly winds, and most of the upwelling on the bank is therefore related to the interactions of the Agulhas Current on its eastern edge, but easterly winds do occur (especially in summer and fall) and can generate local upwelling cells.

As the current is diverted away from the coast, dynamic processes draw an Ekman layer of cooler water up shoreward from below the warmer shelf-edge flow. In spring and summer, at a depth of 100 m (330 ft), a semi-permanent ridge of cold water is present on the eastern and central shelf.

In summer months, a mixture of subtropical water separated by thermoclines from cool waters forms, though with considerable seasonal variation. On the shelf, deeper waters exhibit characteristics of the central Indian Ocean in the east, and central Atlantic Ocean waters in the west.

==== Agulhas meanders and Natal pulses ====
As the Agulhas Current flows south along the African east coast, it is frequently diverted inshore, a deviation from the current's normal path known as Agulhas Current meanders (ACM). These bulges are occasionally (1-7 times per year) followed by a much larger offshore bulge, known as Natal pulses (NP). Natal pulses move along the coast at 20 km (12 mi) per day. An ACM can bulge up to 20 km (12 mi) and a NP up to 120 km (75 mi) from the current's mean position. The AC passes 34 km (21 mi) offshore and an ACM can reach 123 km (76 mi) offshore. When the AC meanders, its width broadens from 88 km (55 mi) to 125 km (78 mi) and its velocity decreases from 208 cm/s (82 in/s) to 136 cm/s (54 in/s). An ACM induces a strong inshore counter-current.

Large-scale cyclonic meanders from Natal pulses are formed as the Agulhas Current reaches the continental shelf on the eastern South African coast (i.e. the eastern Agulhas Bank off Natal). As these pulses move along the Agulhas Bank, they tend to pinch off Agulhas rings. Such ring shedding can be triggered by a Natal pulse alone, but meanders on the Agulhas Return Current may merge to contribute to Agulhas ring formation.

==== Agulhas leakage and rings ====
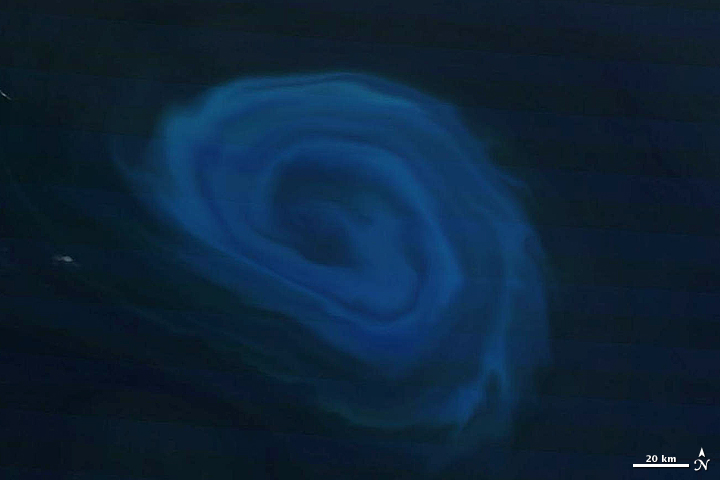
Light blue plankton in a 150 km (93 mi) wide anti-cyclonic (counter-clockwise) Agulhas ring, 800 km (500 mi) off the coast of South Africa. Such eddies, among the largest in the world, are peeled off the Agulhas Current on the eastern edge of the Agulhas Bank.

Agulhas rings are large anticyclonic eddies or warm core rings of ocean water that are pinched off the Agulhas Current along the eastern edge of the Agulhas Bank from where they move into the South Atlantic. As the Agulhas Current reaches the east coast of South Africa, large solitary meanders known as Natal pulses form at irregular intervals. 165 days after the appearance of a Natal pulse, an Agulhas ring will form off Durban. Agulhas rings are among the largest eddies in the world and play an important role in the Agulhas Leakage, the transport of warm water from the Indian Ocean to the Atlantic Ocean, affecting global climate.

The average diameter of these Agulhas rings is of 320 km (200 mi), but they can grow to over 500 km. They extend down to the ocean floor, circulating at 0.3–1.5 m/s (0.98–4.92 ft/s), and move into the South Atlantic at 4–8 km (2.5–5.0 mi)/day. Only half of the Agulhas eddies that leave the Cape Basin manage to cross the Walvis Ridge, and those that do tend to lose half their energy within the six months before reaching the ridge. The Agulhas rings transport an estimated 1-5 Sv (millions m^{2}/s) of water from the Indian Ocean to the South Atlantic.

The Agulhas rings are thought to be of global climatic importance. Their delivery of warm water from the Indian to the Atlantic Ocean can control the rate of thermohaline overturning for the entire Atlantic, though other factors contribute in varying degrees to the inter-ocean exchanges in the region, including filaments from the Agulhas Current and intrusions of water from Antarctica. Cold, cyclonic eddies have been observed in the south-western Atlantic. Based on model simulations, researchers have found that the interaction of the Agulhas Current and the eastern edge of the bank are responsible for Agulhas rings.

The provenance of ocean sediments can be determined by analysing terrigenous strontium isotope ratios in deep ocean core samples. Sediments underlying the Agulhas Current and Return Current have significantly differing ratios to those of surrounding sediments. Analyses of cores in the South Atlantic deposited during the Last Glacial Maximum (LGM, 20 000 years ago), show that the Agulhas leakage (shedding of Agulhas rings) was significantly reduced during the period. It has been hypothesised that the reason for this was a relatively stronger Agulhas Current, resulting in more eastward retroflection (and therefore less leakage). However, analyses of such cores south of the African coast show that the trajectory of the current was the same during the LGM, and that the reduced leakage must be explained by a weaker current. Consequently, it can be predicted that a stronger Agulhas Current will result in its retroflection occurring more eastward, with an increased Agulhas leakage.

=== Benguela Current ===
Compared to the Agulhas Current, the Benguela Current on the west and south-west coast of Africa is more intense and steadier. Its dynamic southern upwelling system is driven by the prevailing northward winds that produce an intense off-shore Ekman transport. Most of this upwelling is concentrated to a few upwelling cells in the southern region: Namaqua (30°S), Cape Columbine (32.5°S), and Cape Peninsula (34°S). The wind is most intense from October to February, and the contrast in sea surface temperature between the open sea and the shelf is most prominent during summer.

Coastal upwelling is also common on the western bank, but the more stable atmospheric condition results in larger cold water plumes that sometimes merge to form a continuous upwelling regime along the South African south-west coast. This upwelling zone is the southernmost extension of the Benguela Current Large Maritime Ecosystem. The Agulhas Current regularly flows around the southern tip of the bank and brings warm water to the western bank along the bank's western edge. Regularly, the mesoscale eddies from the east interact with the Benguela upwelling system on the African west coast.

=== Deep water eddies ===
Flowing south along the South American continental slope, the Deep Western Boundary Current (DWBC) carries North Atlantic Deep Water (NADW) into the South Atlantic. At about 8°S and at a depth of 2,200–3,500 m (7,200–11,500 ft), the DWBC breaks into anticyclonic eddies during periods of strong meridional overturning circulation. One such NADW eddy was observed in 2003 and the researchers speculated that a deeply penetrating Agulhas ring pinched it off the NADW slope current. Spinning at 20 cm/s (7.9 in/s), these deep-water eddies move around the southern tip of the Agulhas Bank and into the Indian Ocean. Most of the NADW flow (more than 7 Sv) meanders east around the Agulhas Plateau together with the surface Agulhas Return Current, but a smaller portion (3 Sv) continues north along the African east-coast as the Agulhas Undercurrent. Of 89.5 Sv released from the North Atlantic, 3.6 Sv leaves the South Atlantic south of the Agulhas Bank. However, 0.9 Sv recirculate in the basin north of the Walvis Ridge for centuries, of which 50-90% end up flowing south of the Agulhas Bank within 300 years, increasing the net inter-oceanic exchange with 4.1-4.5 Sv.

=== Alphard Banks ===
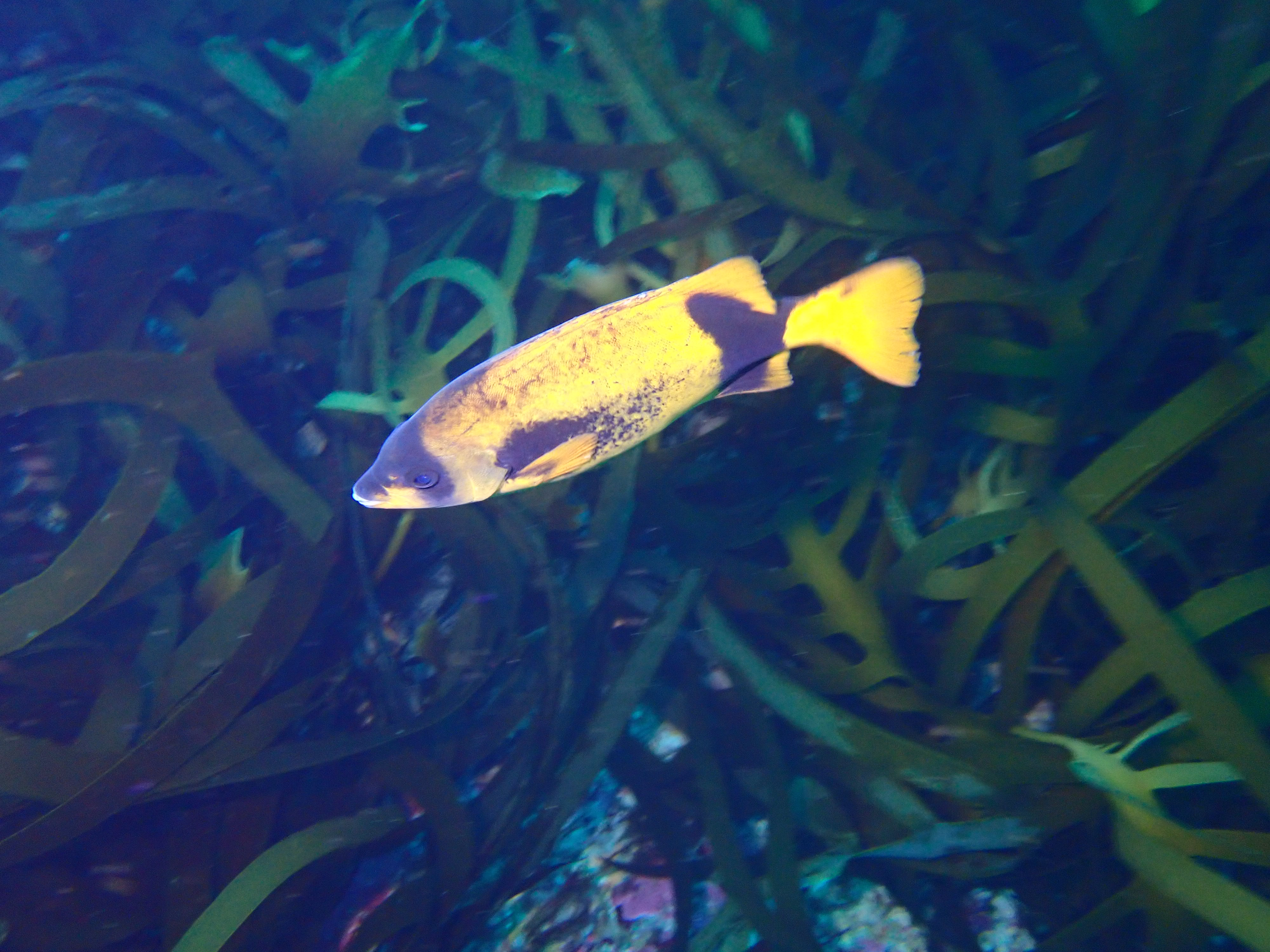
Juvenile Cape knifejaw and kelp forest at Alphard Banks

The Alphard Banks are a small group of long extinct volcanic seamounts on the Agulhas Bank south of Cape Agulhas. They rise from the bottom at about 80 m to about 14 m on the top. They are the southernmost recreational diving sites on the African continental shelf, and are seldom dived due to the distance offshore. The Alpard banks are in the Alphard Banks Controlled-Pelagic Linefish Zone of the Agulhas Bank Complex Marine Protected Area. The habitats are depth and profile related, with the shallower, flatter, areas of the pinnacle tops dominated by spiny kelp (Ecklonia radiata), and encrusting invertebrates, and the deeper, steeper, areas below 30 m having little kelp and a more upright invertebrate community.

=== Dalgleish Bank ===
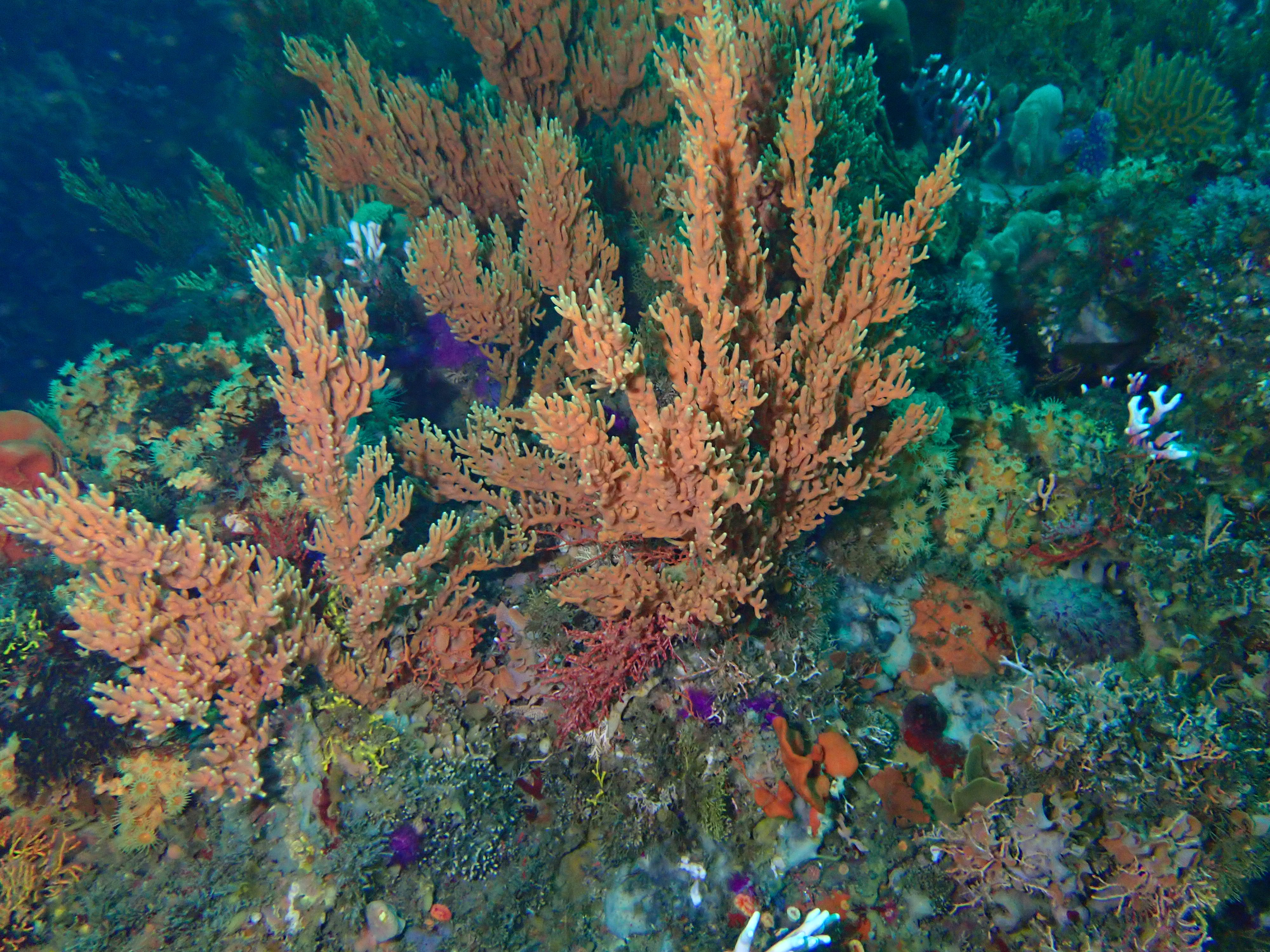
Dalgleish sea fan at Dalgleish Bank

Dalgleish Bank is a relatively shallow area of rocky reef about 11 km offshore of Buffelsbaai, or 15.5 km, (about 8.3 nautical miles) bearing 218°T from Knysna Heads. Maximum depth in the immediate vicinity is about 80 m, and the shallowest part of the reef is about 29 m.

== Geology ==
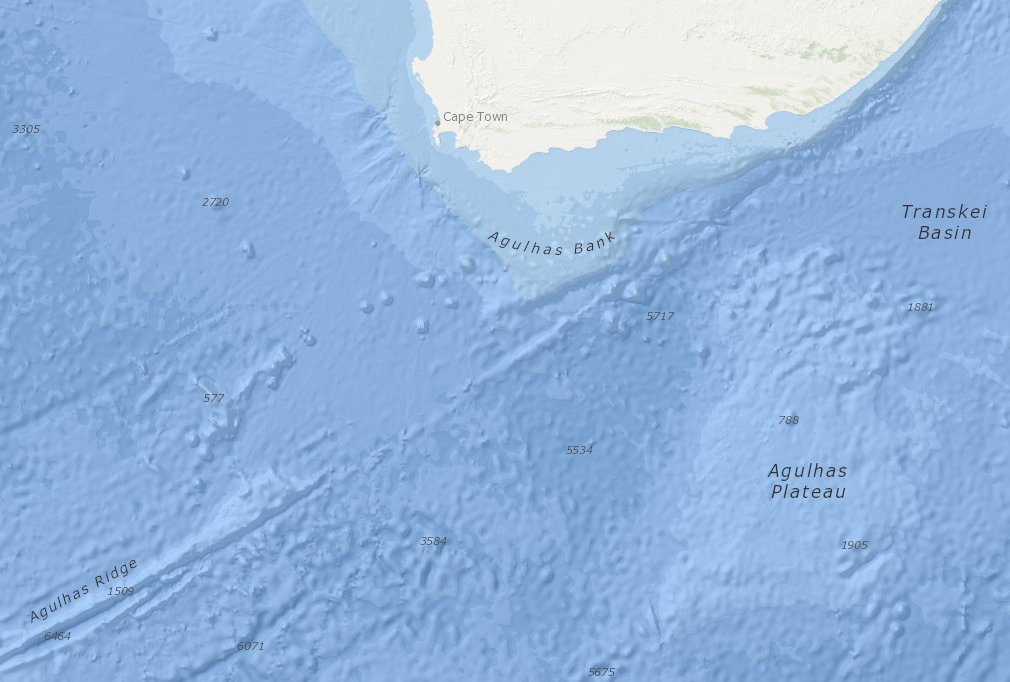
The Agulhas Bank relative to the Agulhas Ridge, Basin, and Plateau

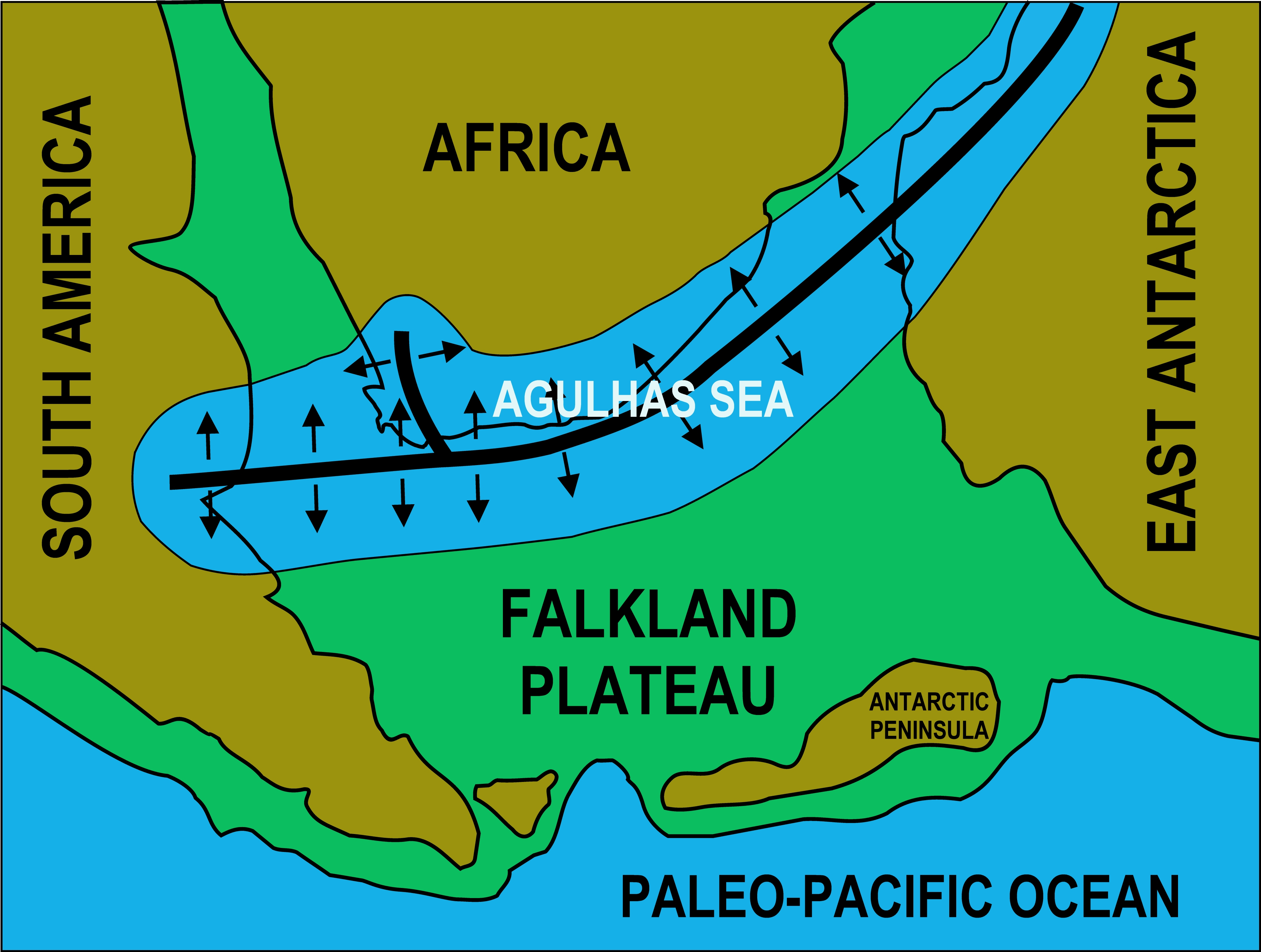
As Gondwana formed 500 mya, a rift appeared which eventually developed into the Agulhas Sea. This sea filled with sediments that were to become the Cape Supergroup, which subsequently were folded into the Cape Fold Belt.

The oldest rock found along the coastline of the Agulhas Bank are eugeosynclinal sediments of the up to 3 km (1.9 mi) thick Kaaimans Group deposited during continental rifting some 900 million years ago (Mya). The proto-South Atlantic closed during the Saldanian orogeny to form part of the supercontinent Gondwana (700-600 Mya). The Cape granites were emplaced and the Kaaimans Group rocks were folded and thermally metamorphosed during this period. The formation of the main basin in the Cape Province commenced 570 Mya and lasted for 200 My. The Table Mountain Group is 4 km (2.5 mi) thick and an erosional unconformity marking its base is composed of both terrestrial and marine sediments. Synclines along the coast of the southern Cape contains sediments from the Bokkveld Group.

The Cape Fold Belt (CFB) rocks and the Karoo Basin were deposited 450 Mya; the Cape Supergroup 450-300 Mya during a series of transgression-regression cycles. Pan-African thrusts were reactivated 270-215 Mya to form the CFB which was then part of a continuous fold belt that developed during the Gondwanide orogeny together with Sierra de la Ventana (Argentina), Pensacola Mountains (East Antarctica), and Ellsworth Mountains (West Antarctica). In the late Carboniferous and early Jurassic, the Karoo Supergroup was deposited in the Karoo Basin north of where the CFB is located today, and covering nearly two-thirds of present-day South Africa.

=== Gondwana breakup ===
Basaltic lavas were extruded 183 Mya to form the Karoo large igneous province; a volcanism caused by the Bouvet hotspot which is linked to the Gondwana break-up. The Bouvet hotspot was located in or near present-day South Africa from the late Triassic 220 mya and until the Africa-Antarctica breakup 120 mya. The Bouvet hotspot track stretches south-east from the African continent, near the South Africa-Mozambique border, and east of the AFFZ down to Bouvet Island/Bouvet triple junction in the South Atlantic. 100 Mya, the region where the triple junction was located passed over the hotspot, resulting in a continuous eruption that lasted to about 94 Mya and the seafloor spreading that still separates Antarctica, Africa, and South America.

The Agulhas-Falkland Fracture Zone (AFFZ) stretches 1,200 kilometres (750 mi) across the South Atlantic. It is one of the largest and most spectacular fracture zones on Earth. It developed during the Early Cretaceous as West Gondwana (South America) broke up from Africa. The AFFZ is characterized by a pronounced topographic anomaly, the Agulhas Ridge (41°S,16°E-43°S,9°E) which rises more than 2 km above the surrounding sea floor. The only equivalent in size are the neighbouring Diaz Ridge and the Falkland Escarpment. The Agulhas Ridge is unique because it was not formed during the continental breakup during the Cretaceous and because it separates oceanic crusts of different age, and not oceanic crust (~14 km thick) from continental crust (25 km thick).

North of the AFFZ is the Outeniqua Basin which is a complex system of sub-basins separated from each other by faults and basement arches; there are several smaller fault-bounded sub-basins in the north (Bredasdorp, Infanta, Pletmos, Gamtoos, and Algoa) and a distinctively deeper sub-basin in the south, the South Outeniqua Basin. The sedimentary fill of these basins developed as the northern edge of the Falkland Plateau separated from the South African southern margin during the early Cretaceous.

The Diaz Marginal Ridge (DMR) separates these basins from the AFFZ. The DMR is buried under 200–250 m (660–820 ft) of sediments and sedimentary rocks and 150–200 m (490–660 ft) of this sedimentary material is undisturbed Cretaceous sediments younger than the oldest Cretaceous sedimentary rocks in the Southern Outeniqua Basin. The DMR must therefore have formed after the initial West Gondwana breakup 130-90 Mya. The DMR probably formed when new, hot oceanic crust slid past old, cold continental crust and the contrast in temperatures induced a thermal uplift.

As West Gondwana drifted away from Africa roughly 125 Myr, the South Atlantic seafloor formed between them and magnetic anomalies north of the AFFZ reflects phase of the seafloor spreading. South of the AFFZ traces can be found of how the Falkland Plateau and the Agulhas Bank moved relative to each other. On a modern map, the Falkland Plateau can still be rotated and fitted into the Natal Valley in the Indian Ocean east of South Africa. The Agulhas Plateau is located southeast of the shelf, separated from it by the Agulhas Passage (through which the Agulhas Current flows.)

=== Pliocene ===
The Alphard Tertiary Igneous Province includes Palaeocene tuffs, trachybasalts, aegirine–augite trachytes and aegirine–augite phonolitic trachytes, which have been radiometrically dated at about 58 million years old. The intrusions appear to be tectonic effects.

One of the largest known slumps occurred on the south-eastern edge of the Agulhas Bank in the Pliocene or more recently. Stretching from a depth of 190–700 m (620–2,300 ft), the so-called Agulhas slump is 750 km (470 mi) long, 106 km (66 mi) wide, and has a volume of 20,000 km^{3} (4,800 cu mi). It is a composite slump with proximal and distal allochthonous sediment masses separated by a large glide plane scar. In the western part, the sediments are dammed by basement ridges, but, in the eastern part, they have spread into the Transkei Basin. A series of slump scarps along the western edge of the shelf are 18–2 Mya, but covered by younger sediments brought there by the Benguela upwelling.

== Human evolution ==
Anatomically modern humans evolved around 200 kya. The genetic diversity in the human lineage is relatively low, which indicate one or several population bottlenecks late in our lineage. It has been estimated that the population was limited to perhaps 600 individuals during the MIS 6 glacial stage (195-125 kya), one of the longest cold periods in the Quaternary of Africa. A technological and behavioural revolution that occurred globally about 50 kya led to a cultural complexity which happened in South Africa around 120-70 kya.

The Cape Floral Region is a thin coastal strip and a botanic hotspot which developed at the confluence of the Benguela Upwelling and Agulhas Current. According to what professor Curtis Marean calls the "Cape Floral Region – South Coast Model" for the origins of modern humans, the early hunter-gatherers survived on shellfish, as well as geophytes, fur seal, fish, seabirds, and wash-ups found on the exposed Agulhas Bank. The bank slopes into the sea and a reconstruction of how the coastline has changed over 440 kya shows that the coast during the Pleistocene was located as far as 90 km (56 mi) from the present coast.

The present South African southern coastal plain (SCP) is still separated from the rest of Africa by the Cape Fold Belt. During glacial maxima the sea-level dropped 120 metres (390 ft). This not only left large parts of the Agulhas Bank exposed, which greatly expanded the area of the SCP, but it also reconnected the SCP to the rest of Africa by the shallow water shelves, which broke the isolation of the SCP. Modern humans evolved on the SCP and the fluctuation in sea-levels would have resulted in a significant variation in selective pressure. No fossil records are known from the now submerged shelf, but a series of key fossil sites along the coastal margin of the present SCP provide earliest traces of anatomically modern humans and the use of marine resources.

== Commercial importance ==
South Africa began oil exploration on the Agulhas Bank in the 1980s. Of more than 200 offshore wells in South Africa, most are found on Bredasdorp Basin on the Agulhas Bank.

=== Fishery ===
The Agulhas Bank is also significant for fisheries who use demersal trawling, demersal longline fishing, and midwater trawl fishing on the bank. Squid and small pelagic fishes are also caught. Before the introduction of the EEZ, foreign fisheries used roch-hopper gear trawling on the bank.

Most of the catches are short-lived shelf-zone pelagic species and more long-lived deep-water species. The large populations of sardine and anchovy also present on the shelf follow an annual cycle. Anchovy spawn on the western Agulhas Bank in early summer while the sardines span over a broader season and area — eggs are transported by currents to the nursery area in the St Helena Bay on the South African west coast from where juvenile then migrate back to the Agulhas Bank to spawn.

South Africa has a relatively large fishing industry mostly catching pelagic pilchard and anchovy and demersal hake on the south and western coasts. Though the east coast has fewer commercial fisheries, the large human population along there has resulted in overexploitation of coastal fish and invertebrate stocks by recreational and subsistence fishers. A small aquaculture industry produces mussels and oysters offshore.

Several pelagic species are heavily harvested by the commercial fleet: purse-seine fishery is used to catch sardines, anchovies, and round herring; mid-water trawl fishery to catch horse mackerel and chub mackerel; pelagic longline and pole fishery to catch tunas and swordfish; while hook and line are used inshore to catch squid and teleost species, including snoek and geelbek. All these species are relatively common and are considered having an important role in the ecosystem.

== Biodiversity ==
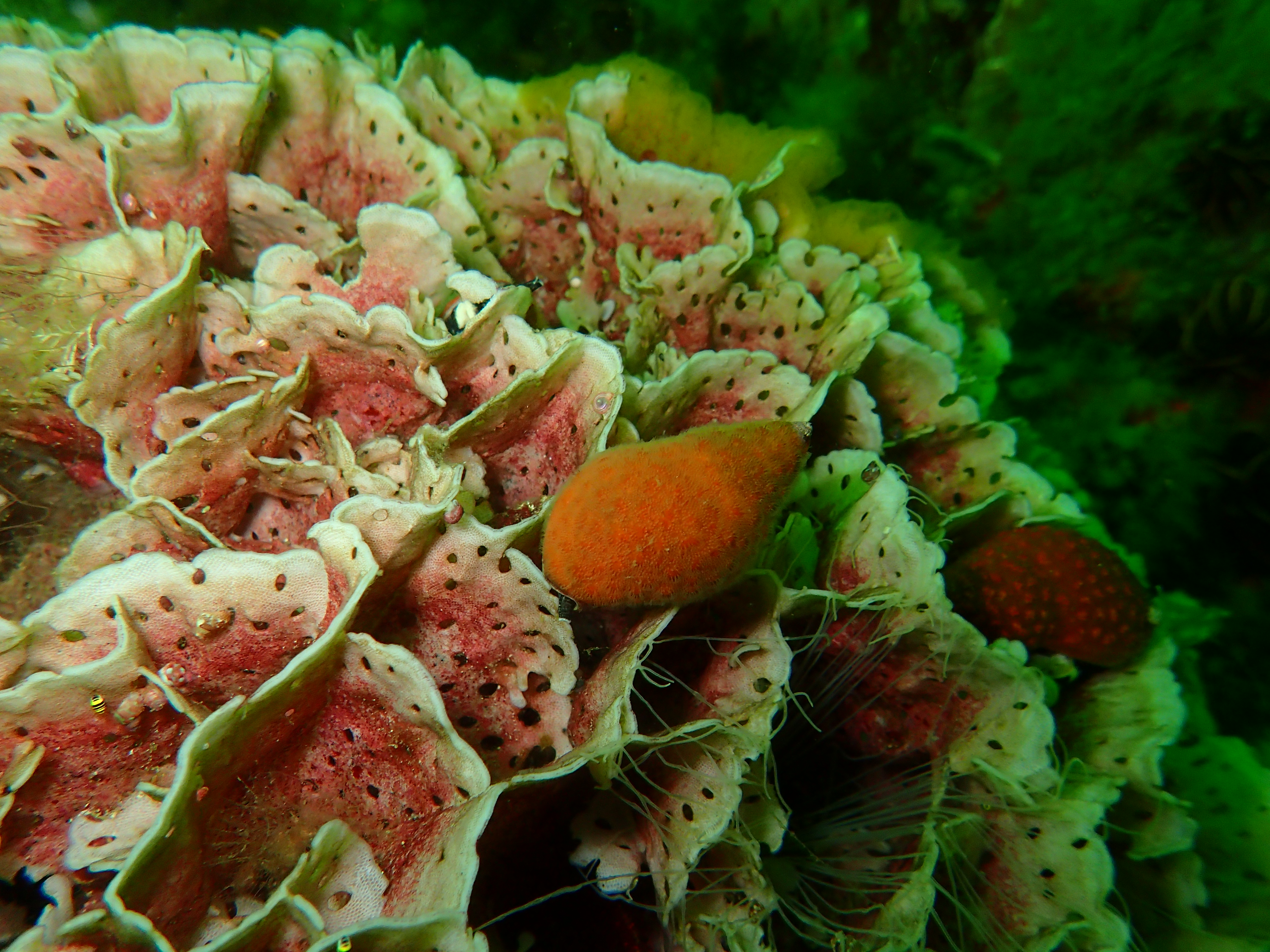
Papery burnupena in False Bay

There are at least 12,914 marine species in South Africa, but small bodied species are poorly documented and the abyssal zone is almost completely unexplored. Almost a quarter of South Africa's coast line is protected, excluding deeper water. A third of the marine species are endemic to South Africa (though poor levels of taxonomic research in adjoining countries probably affects the apparent endemism.) The degree of endemism varies considerably among taxa: Bryozoa 64%, Mollusca 56%, Echinodermata 3.6%, Porifera 8.8%, Amphipoda 33%, Isopoda 85%, or Cumacea 71%. Fisheries are one of the major threats to the biodiversity of the Agulhas Bank.

=== Crustaceans ===
Copepods comprise 90% of the zooplankton carbon on the Agulhas Bank, and are thus an important source of food for pelagic fish and juvenile squids. The population of Calanus agulhensis, a large species that dominates the copepod community in terms of biomass, has a center of distribution on the central Agulhas Bank. Since 1997 the copepod biomass on the central Agulhas Bank has declined significantly while the biomass of pelagic fish has increased significantly. While it is likely that predation has played an important role in the copepod decline, global warming (sea surface temperature and chlorophyll A abundance) is believed to have contributed to a smaller population.

=== Fishes ===
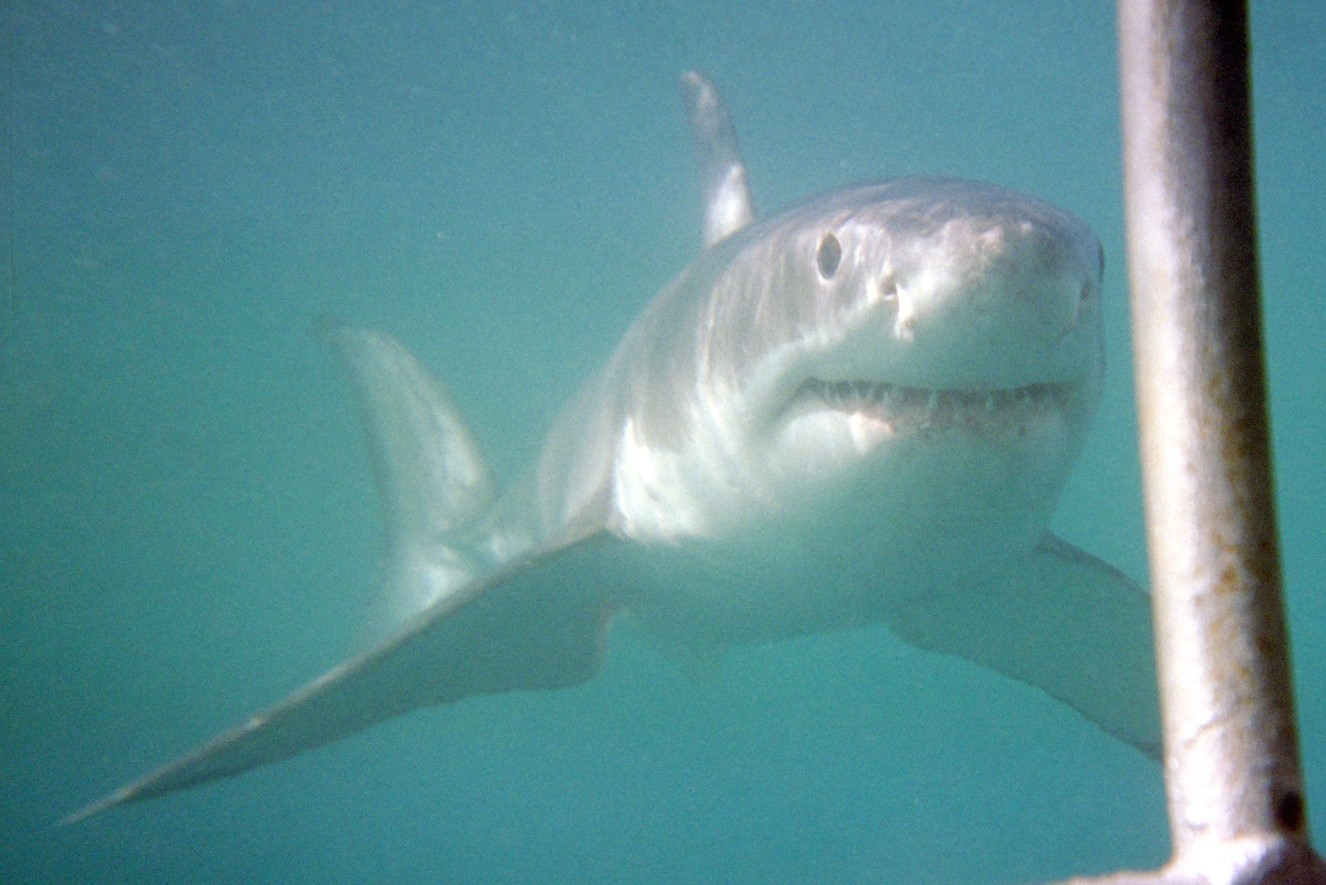
A Great white shark near Dyer Island

The shelf edge along the bank's southern tip is subject to sporadic upwelling. This slope and its surrounding seamounts are the spawning ground for sardine, anchovy, and horse mackerel. Eddies help transport water inshore and link the spawning habitat with important nursery areas. Eggs and larvae laid by the anchovy are transported via the Good Hope Jet to Africa's southwestern coast where they mature. Young anchovies then return to the Agulhas Bank to spawn. Young sardine and anchovy congregate along the west coast between March and September before they migrate to their spawning grounds on the Agulhas Bank. Sardines of intermediate age are present on the western Agulhas Bank between January and April before migrating to KwaZulu-Natal for winter. The spawning on the Agulhas Bank takes place 30–130 km (19–81 mi) offshore from September to February.

The bank is the spawning area of deep reef fish species, including the threatened endemic red steenbras (Petrus rupestris). Other species have been overexploited, including daggerhead seabream or dageraad (Chrysoblephus cristiceps), black musselcracker (Cymatoceps nasutus), and silver kob (Argyrosomus inodorus).

57 species of sharks have been reported off the western coast of South Africa, of which 21 are squaloid sharks.

=== Birds ===
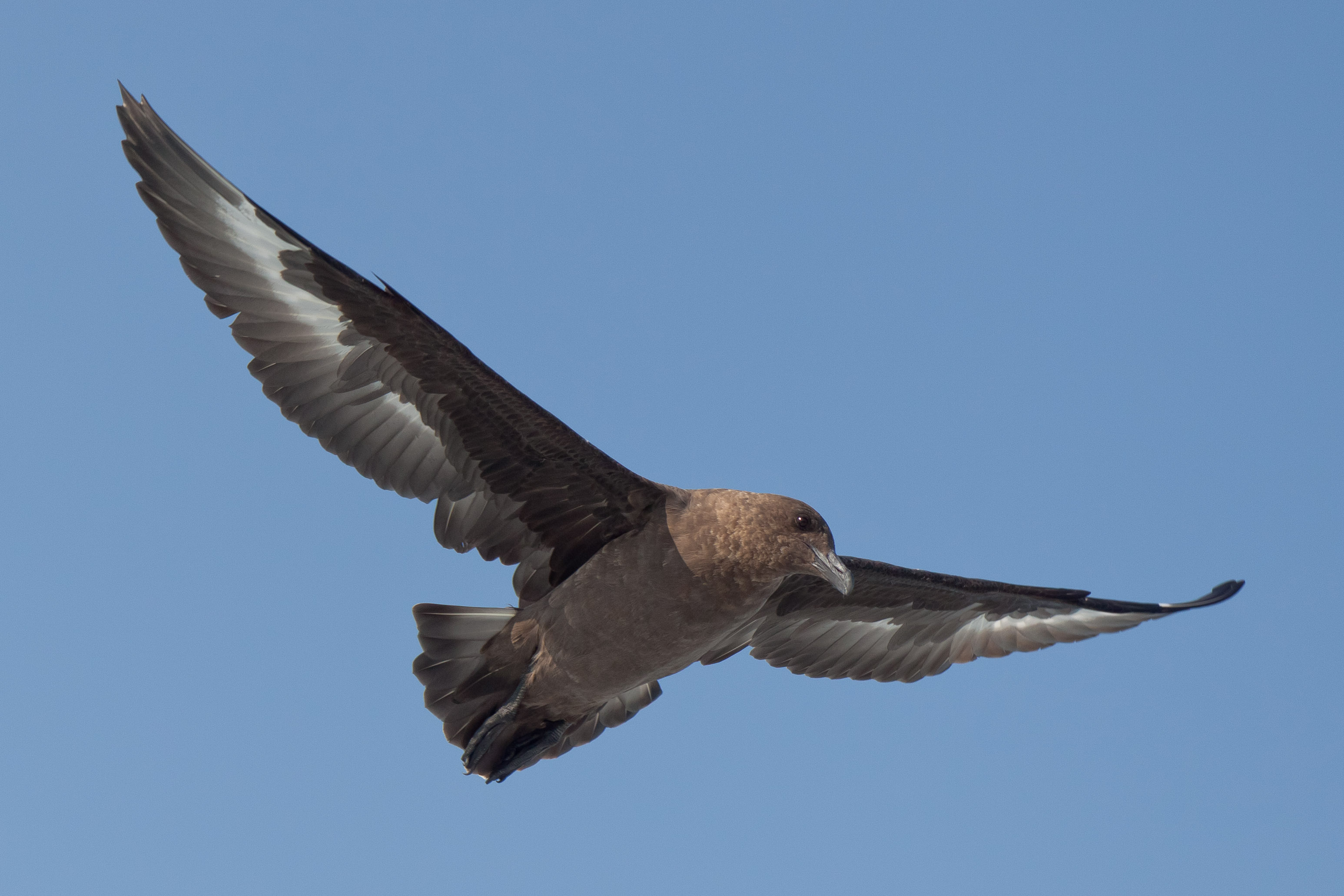
Brown skua near Dyer Island

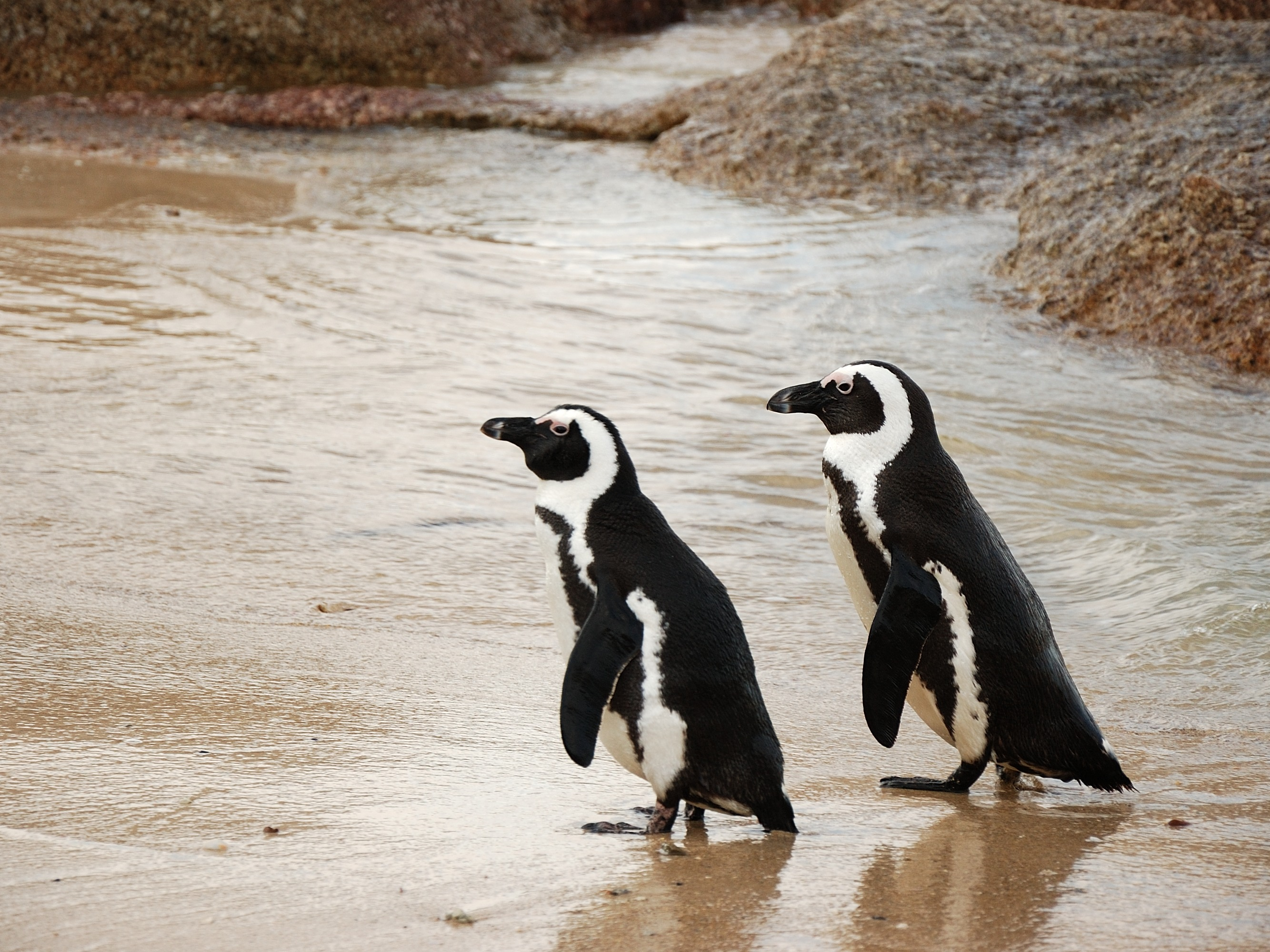
African penguins at Table Mountain National Park

The main food source for African penguins (Spheniscus demersus) is anchovy and sardine which they forage between Cape Columbine and the central Agulhas Bank. The birds have colonies on Dassen Island, on the South African west coast, and Bird Island, on the south coast. African penguins breed opportunistically, following the anchovy and sardine: from February to September on the Western Cape but from January to July on St Croix Island off Eastern Cape. After breeding, the birds forage further offshore: 10–15 km (6.2–9.3 mi) off the western coast and up to 40 km (25 mi) from their colonies off Eastern Cape.

In 2005, when Korean and Philippine vessels started longline fishing along the edges of the Agulhas Bank, seabird bycatch became a huge problem. Large numbers of albatrosses and petrels were killed — in average 0.6 birds per 1000 hooks, but up to 18 birds per 1000 hooks were reported. Since 2007, however, more restrictive permit conditions for foreign-flagged fleets and the use of birds scaring lines have decreased the number of killed birds by 85%.

=== Fur seals ===
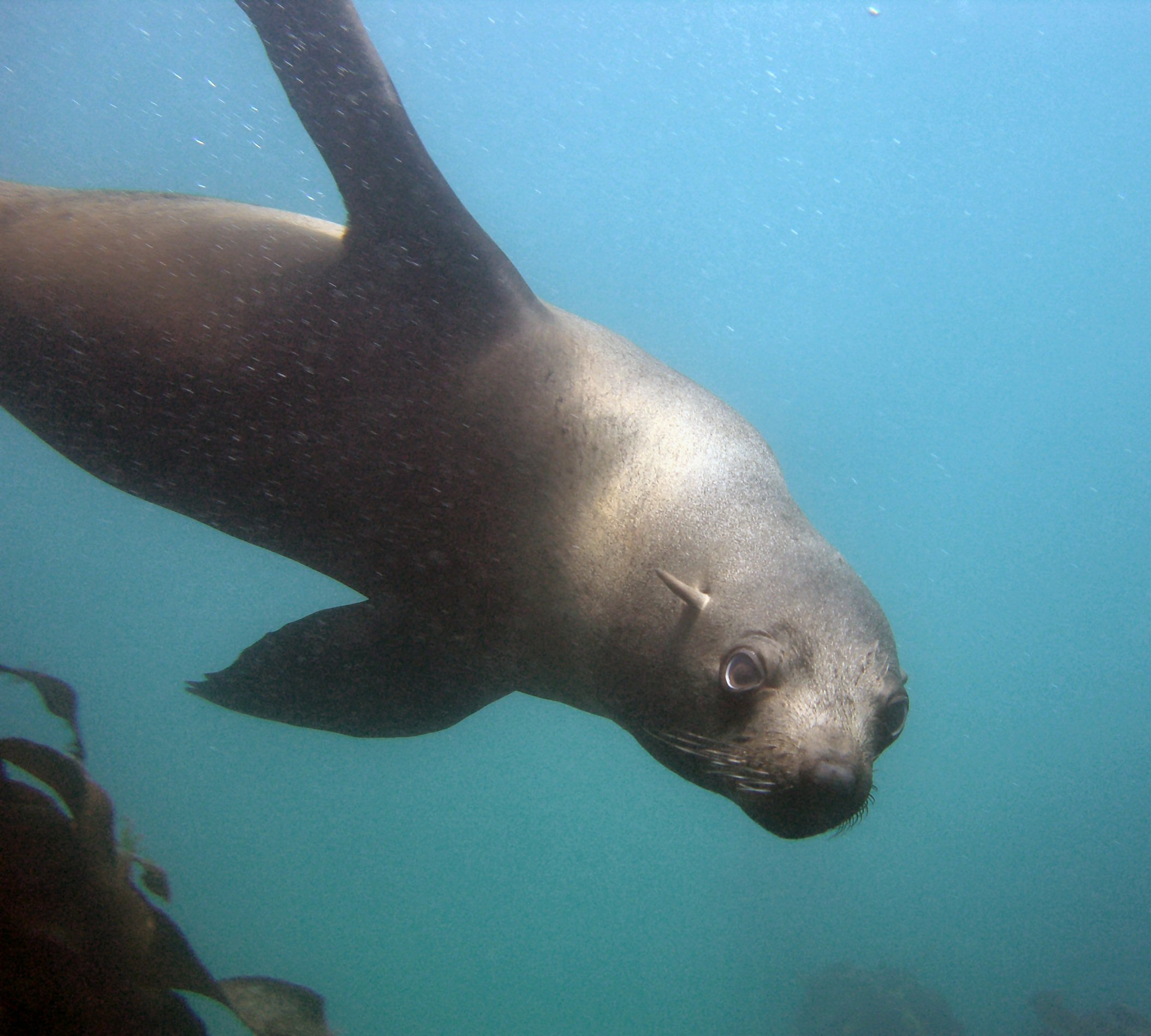
A Cape fur seal diving off Cape Town

Cape fur seals are present along the South African coast. Fur seals are protected in South Africa since 1893 although a small number are occasionally culled to protect sea birds. Many seals are caught in fishery nets and boat propellers, but the seals are also regularly accused of stealing fish from the fisheries. Sharks are known to prey on them, but in 2012 a cape fur seal was observed preying on and consuming a mid-sized blue shark.

=== Cetaceans ===
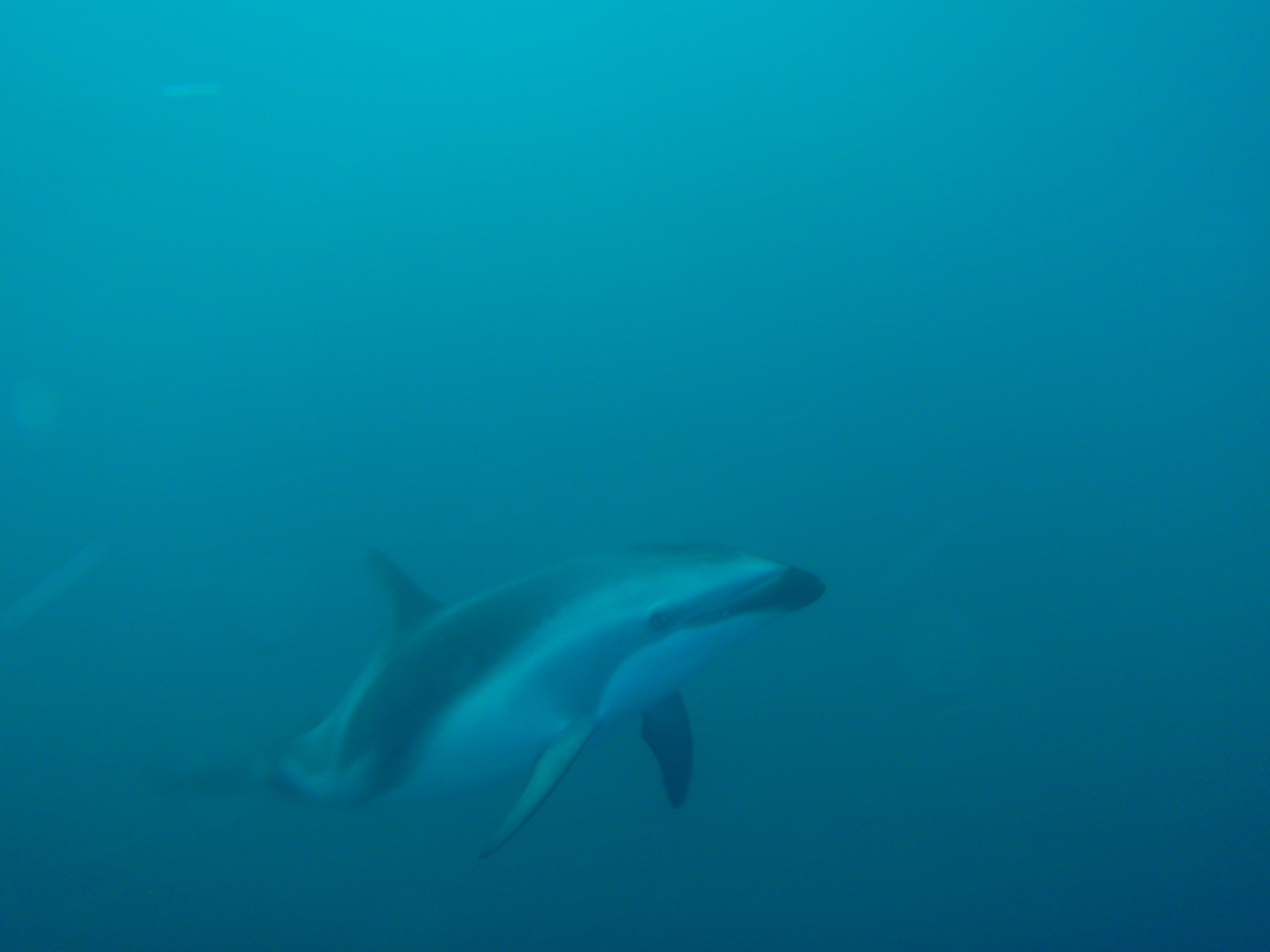
A dusky dolphin on the Cape Peninsula west coast

51 species, or more than 50%, of the recognized species of cetaceans are present in the southern African subregion (between the equator and the Antarctic ice edge), of which 36 have been sighted in South African and Namibian waters.

A vulnerable population of fish-eating killer whales are present offshore on the Agulhas Bank. Observations peak in January while few are sighted in April and May. The killer whales move in pods of 1-4 individuals and are mostly observed over the shelf edge off the south-east coast. An analysis of killer whale mtDNA has shown that there was a peak inter-oceanic migration events during the Eemian interglacial period, 131-114 kya. This peak coincides with a period of maximal Agulhas leakage which promoted a rapid and episodic interchange of killer whale lineages. During this period killer whales and other marine top predators, such as the great white shark, colonised the North Atlantic and Mediterranean by following their prey — bluefin tuna and swordfish.

A vagrant Commerson's dolphin — a species with two isolated populations, one along the southern coast of Argentina and the other around the Kerguelen Islands — was sighted on the Agulhas Bank in 2004. It is not known from which population the sighted individual stems. The Kerguelen Islands are located 4,200 km (2,600 mi) and South America 6,300 km (3,900 mi) from the Agulhas Bank, but the west-ward direction of the Antarctic Circumpolar Current would force the dolphin to swim against the current from the Kerguelen Islands.

Fossil beaked whales have been recovered by trawling from the seafloor off South Africa. Stranded pygmy sperm whales have been recorded on both the east and west coasts of South Africa.

== Conservation ==
There are several marine protected areas on the Agulhas Bank. These include:

Coastal MPAs:

- Addo Elephant National Park Marine Protected Area – Marine conservation area in South Africa (Nelson Mandela Bay, Port Elizabeth, Eastern Cape, 2019)
- Betty's Bay Marine Protected Area – Marine conservation area in the Western Cape in South Africa (Western Cape, 2000)
- Bird Island Marine Protected Area – Marine conservation area in the Eastern Cape in South Africa (Eastern Cape, 2004)
- Browns Bank Corals Marine Protected Area – Marine conservation area on the continental slope of South Africa (South of Cape Town, Western Cape, 2019)(
- De Hoop Marine Protected Area – Marine conservation area on the coast of South Africa (Western Cape, 2000)
- Goukamma Marine Protected Area – Marine conservation area the Western Cape in South Africa (Western Cape, 2000)
- Helderberg Marine Protected Area – Marine conservation area in the Western Cape in South Africa (Western Cape, 2000)
- Hluleka Marine Protected Area – Marine conservation area in the Eastern Cape in South Africa (Eastern Cape, 2000)
- Robberg Marine Protected Area – Coastal conservation area in the Western Cape of South Africa (Western Cape, 2000)
- Sardinia Bay Marine Protected Area – Marine conservation area in the Eastern Cape in South Africa (Eastern Cape, 2000)
- Table Mountain National Park Marine Protected Area – Marine conservation area around the Cape Peninsula in South Africa (Western Cape, 2004, partly in the area which may be considered part of the Agulhas Bank)
- Tsitsikamma Marine Protected Area – Marine conservation area on the south coast of South Africa (Eastern Cape, 2000)
- Walker Bay Whale Sanctuary – Marine conservation area in the Western Cape province in South Africa (Western Cape, 2001, seasonal)

Offshore MPAs:

- Agulhas Bank Complex Marine Protected Area – Offshore marine conservation area south of Cape Agulhas in South Africa (South of Cape Agulhas, Western Cape, 2019)
- Agulhas Front Marine Protected Area – Offshore marine conservation area off the Eastern Cape in South Africa's EEZ (South of Port Elizabeth, Eastern Cape, 2019)
- Agulhas Muds Marine Protected Area – Marine conservation area offshore of the Western Cape in South Africa (South of Cape Agulhas, Western Cape. 2019)
- Port Elizabeth Corals Marine Protected Area – Marine conservation area off the Eastern Cape in South Africa (Offshore of Port Elizabeth, Eastern Cape, 2019)
