= Retroflect =

Movement of an ocean current that doubles back on itself

Retroflection is the movement of an ocean current that doubles back on itself.

== Usage history ==
More commonly used to describe the way the mammalian intestine or uterus might turn back on itself, retroflection was first used in an oceanographic sense in 1970 by South African oceanographer Nils Bang, to describe the Agulhas Current which curves on itself at the southern tip of Africa to become the Agulhas Return Current. Bang credited the inspiration for the metaphor to his wife, Alison Coombe Bang, a nursing sister, who mentioned the term during her midwifery studies. Bang's research, through the University of Cape Town, was done on a limited budget and with rudimentary equipment, yet his studies using closely spaced bathythermograph readings, were later corroborated by satellite thermal imagery. The term was then revived and is now common parlance among oceanographers. The Agulhas current's retroflection is now key to an understanding of its dynamics.

== Retroflection regions ==
The North Brazil Current (NBC) is a western boundary current that flows off the coast of northeast Brazil, in the tropical Atlantic that transports upper ocean waters across the equator. It retroflects between 4°N and 10°N. Particularly during summer and fall, the NBC retroflects from the coast at 6° to 7°N and feeds the North Equatorial Countercurrent and North Equatorial Undercurrent. The NBC sheds large anticyclonic rings that move northwestward along the continental break. (Didden and Schott, 1993). These warm rings could play an important role in the net meridional transport of warm water in the upper layers of the Atlantic Ocean as part of the meridional overturning circulation (MOC).

In the southeast Atlantic Ocean the current retroflects (turns back on itself) in the Agulhas Retroflection due to shear interactions with the strong Antarctic Circumpolar Current. This water becomes the Agulhas Return Current, rejoining the Indian Ocean Gyre. It is estimated that up to 85 Sv (Sverdrups) of the net transport is returned to the Indian Ocean through the retroflection. The remaining water is transported into the South Atlantic Gyre in the Agulhas Leakage. Along with direct branch currents, this leakage takes place in surface water filaments, and Agulhas eddies.
