= Ocean current =

Directional mass flow of oceanic water

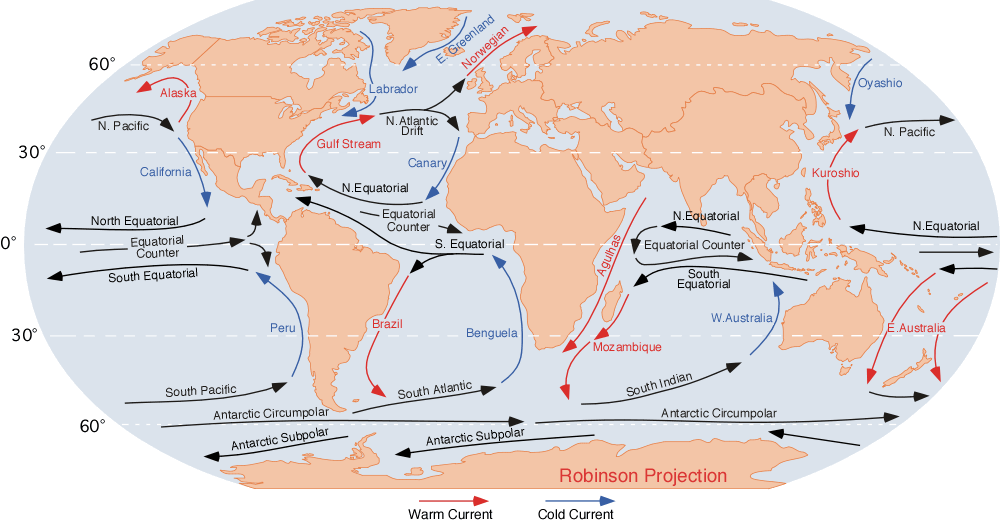
Ocean surface currents

Distinctive white lines trace the flow of surface currents around the world.

Visualization showing global ocean currents from January 1, 2010, to December 31, 2012, at sea level, then at 2,000 m (6,600 ft) below sea level

Animation of circulation around ice shelves of Antarctica

An ocean current is a continuous, directed movement of seawater generated by a number of forces acting upon the water, including wind, the Coriolis effect, breaking waves, cabbeling, and temperature and salinity differences. Depth contours, shoreline configurations, and interactions with other currents influence a current's direction and strength. Ocean currents move both horizontally, on scales that can span entire oceans, as well as vertically, with vertical currents (upwelling and downwelling) playing an important role in the movement of nutrients and gases, such as carbon dioxide, between the surface and the deep ocean.

Ocean currents are classified by temperature as either warm currents or cold currents. They are also classified by their velocity, dimension, and direction as either drifts, currents, or streams. Drifts, such as the North Atlantic Drift Current, involve the forward movement of surface ocean water under the influence of the prevailing wind. Currents, such as the Labrador Current, involve the movement of oceanic water in a more definite direction at a greater velocity than drifts. Streams, such as the Gulf Stream, involve movement of larger masses of ocean water with greater velocity than drifts or currents.

Ocean currents are patterns of water movement that influence climate zones and weather patterns around the world. They are primarily driven by winds and by seawater density, although many other factors influence them, including the shape and configuration of the oceanic basin they flow through. The two basic types of currents – surface and deep-water currents – help define the character and flow of ocean waters across the planet.

Ocean currents flow for great distances, and together they create the global conveyor belt, which plays a dominant role in determining the climate of many of Earth's regions. More specifically, ocean currents influence the temperature of the regions through which they travel. For example, warm currents traveling along more temperate coasts increase the temperature of the area by warming the sea breezes that blow over them. Perhaps the most striking example is the Gulf Stream, which, together with its extension the North Atlantic Drift, makes northwest Europe much more temperate for its high latitude than other areas at the same latitude. Another example is Lima, Peru, whose cooler subtropical climate contrasts with that of its surrounding tropical latitudes because of the Humboldt Current.

The largest ocean current is the Antarctic Circumpolar Current (ACC), a wind-driven current which flows clockwise uninterrupted around Antarctica. The ACC connects all the oceanic basins together, and also provides a link between the atmosphere and the deep ocean due to the way water upwells and downwells on either side of it.

== Causes ==
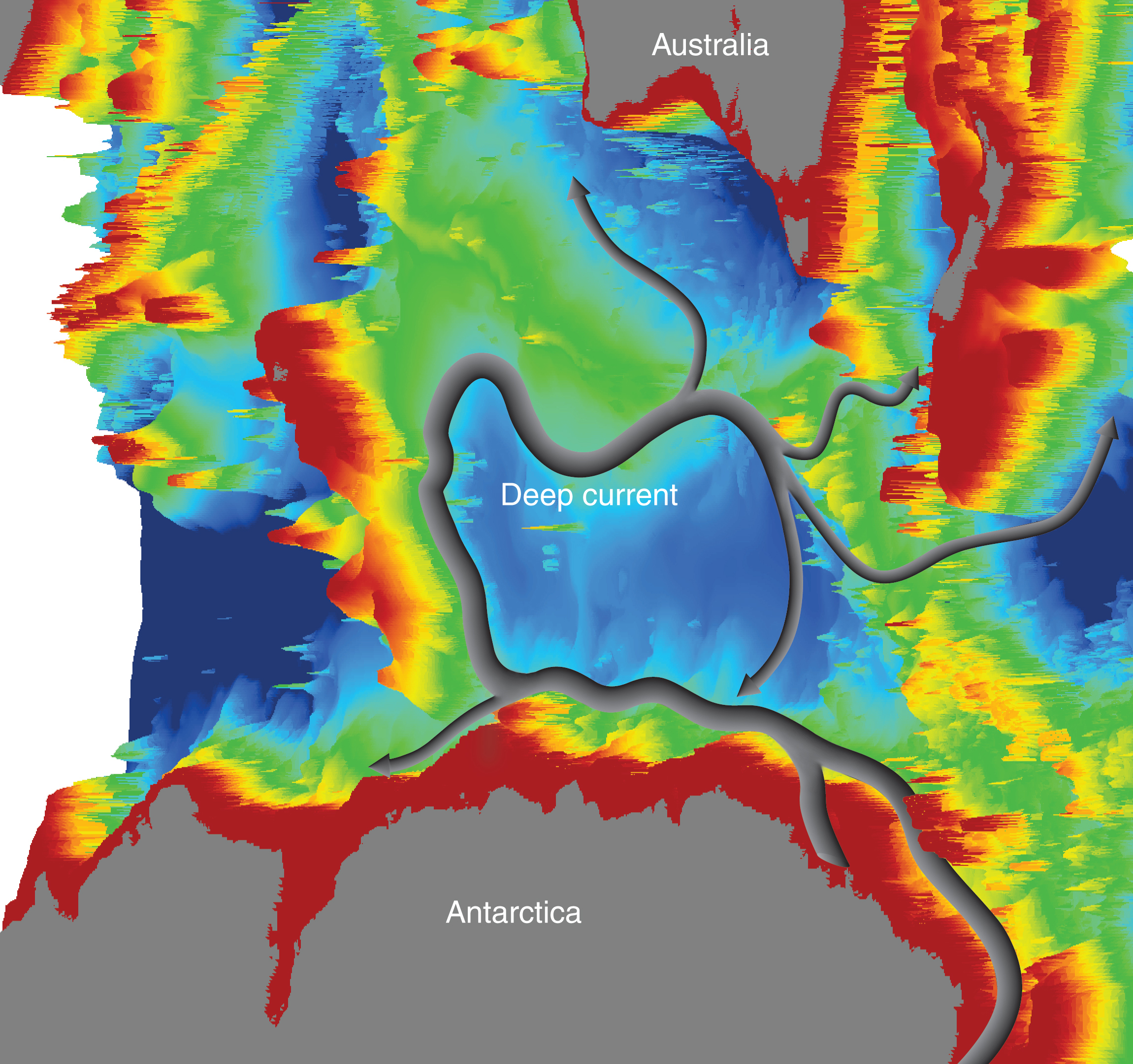
The bathymetry of the Kerguelen Plateau in the Southern Ocean governs the course of the Kerguelen deep western boundary current, part of the global network of ocean currents.

Ocean currents are driven by the wind, by the gravitational pull of the Moon in the form of tides, and by the effects of variations in water density. Ocean dynamics define and describe the motion of water within the oceans.

Ocean temperature and motion fields can be separated into three distinct layers: mixed (surface) layer, upper ocean (above the thermocline), and deep ocean. Ocean currents are measured in units of sverdrup (Sv), where 1 Sv is equivalent to a volume flow rate of 1,000,000 m^{3} (35,000,000 ft^{3}) per second.

There are two main types of currents, surface currents and deep-water currents. Generally surface currents are driven by wind systems and deep-water currents are driven by differences in water density due to variations in water temperature and salinity.

=== Wind-driven circulation ===
Surface oceanic currents are driven by wind currents, the large scale prevailing winds drive major persistent ocean currents, and seasonal or occasional winds drive currents of similar persistence to the winds that drive them, and the Coriolis effect plays a major role in their development. The Ekman spiral velocity distribution results in the currents flowing at an angle to the driving winds, and they develop typical clockwise spirals in the Northern Hemisphere and counter-clockwise rotation in the Southern Hemisphere. In addition, the areas of surface ocean currents move somewhat with the seasons; this is most notable in equatorial currents.

Deep ocean basins generally have a non-symmetric surface current, in that the eastern equator-ward flowing branch is broad and diffuse whereas the pole-ward flowing western boundary current is relatively narrow.

=== Thermohaline circulation ===
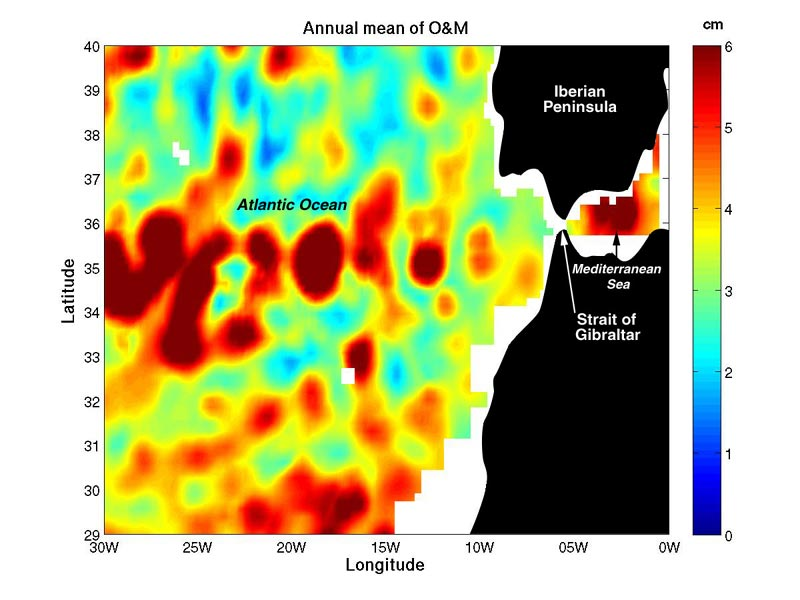
Coupling data collected by NASA/JPL by several different satellite-borne sensors, researchers have been able to "break through" the ocean's surface to detect "Meddies" – super-salty warm-water eddies that originate in the Mediterranean Sea and then sink more than a half-mile underwater in the Atlantic Ocean. The Meddies are shown in red in this scientific figure.

Large scale currents are driven by gradients in water density, which in turn depend on variations in temperature and salinity. This thermohaline circulation is also known as the ocean's conveyor belt. Where significant vertical movement of ocean currents is observed, this is known as upwelling and downwelling. The adjective thermohaline derives from thermo- referring to temperature and -haline referring to salt content, factors which together determine the density of seawater.

The thermohaline circulation is a part of the large-scale ocean circulation that is driven by global density gradients created by surface heat and freshwater fluxes. Wind-driven surface currents (such as the Gulf Stream) travel polewards from the equatorial Atlantic Ocean, cooling en route, and eventually sinking at high latitudes (forming North Atlantic Deep Water). This dense water then flows into the ocean basins. While the bulk of it upwells in the Southern Ocean, the oldest waters (with a transit time of around 1000 years) upwell in the North Pacific. Extensive mixing therefore takes place between the ocean basins, reducing differences between them and making the Earth's oceans a global system. On their journey, the water masses transport both energy (in the form of heat) and matter (solids, dissolved substances and gases) around the globe. As such, the state of the circulation has a large impact on the climate of the Earth. The thermohaline circulation is sometimes called the ocean conveyor belt, the great ocean conveyor, or the global conveyor belt. On occasion, it is imprecisely used to refer to the meridional overturning circulation, (MOC).

Since the 2000s an international program called Argo has been mapping the temperature and salinity structure of the ocean with a fleet of automated platforms that float with the ocean currents. The information gathered will help explain the role the oceans play in the Earth's climate.

== Effects on climate and ecology ==
Ocean currents affect temperatures throughout the world. For example, the ocean current that brings warm water up the north Atlantic to northwest Europe also cumulatively and slowly blocks ice from forming along the seashores, which would also block ships from entering and exiting inland waterways and seaports, hence ocean currents play a decisive role in influencing the climates of regions through which they flow. Ocean currents are important in the study of marine debris.

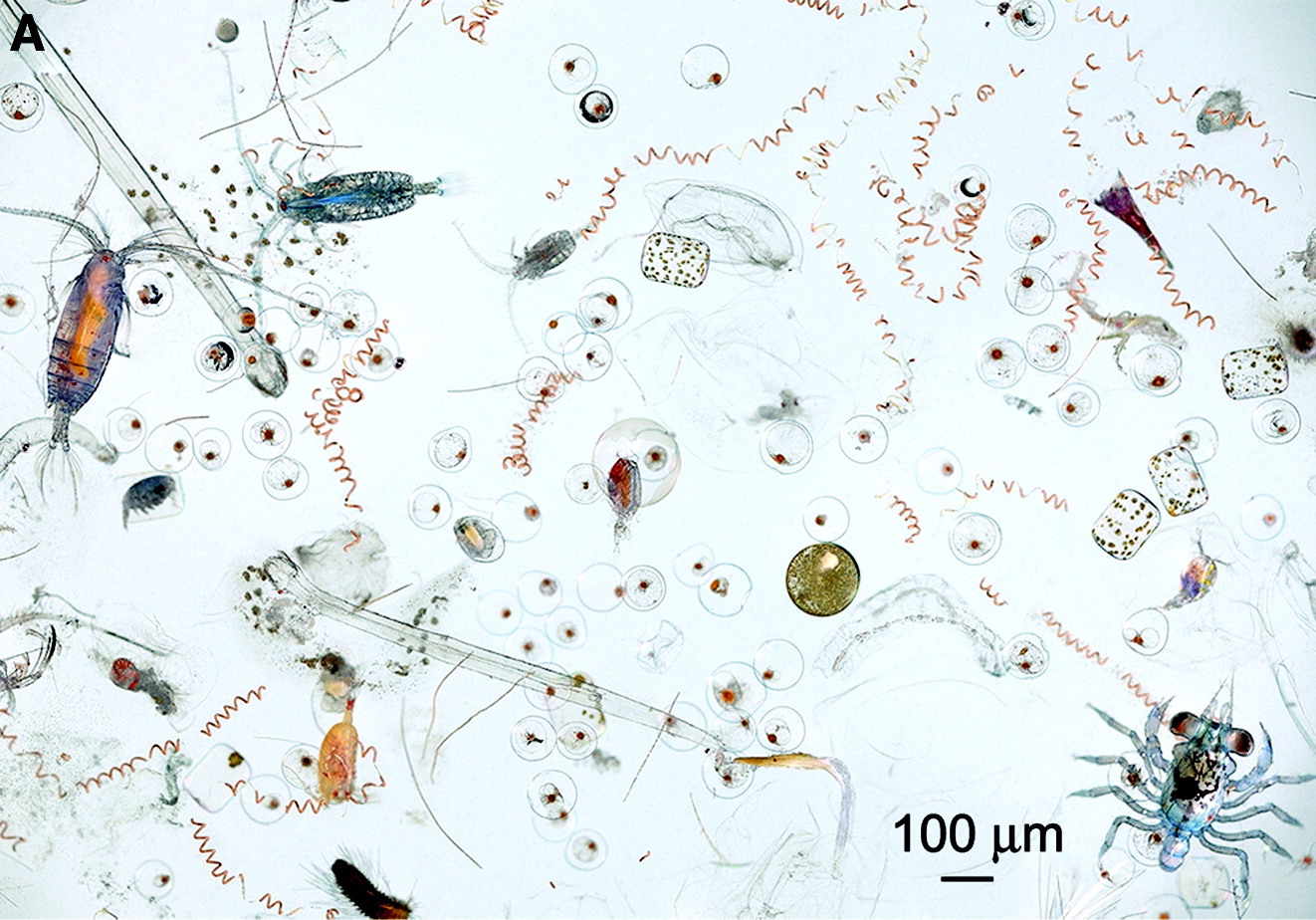
Plankton are dispersed by ocean currents.

Upwellings and cold ocean water currents flowing from polar and sub-polar regions bring in nutrients that support plankton growth, which are crucial prey items for several key species in marine ecosystems.

Ocean currents are also important in the dispersal and distribution of many organisms, including those with pelagic egg or larval stages. An example is the life-cycle of the European Eel. Terrestrial species, for example tortoises and lizards, can be carried on floating debris by currents to colonise new terrestrial areas and islands.

== Ocean currents and climate change ==
The continued rise of atmospheric temperatures is anticipated to have various effects on the strength of surface ocean currents, wind-driven circulation and dispersal patterns. Ocean currents play a significant role in influencing climate, and shifts in climate in turn impact ocean currents.

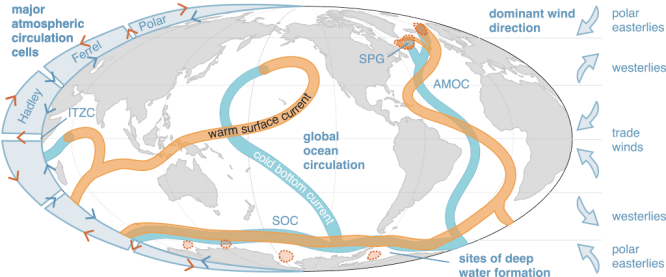
Human-induced climate change is leading to long-term alterations in ocean and atmospheric circulation. The accumulation of greenhouse gases traps extra heat within the Earth's system, causing both the atmosphere and oceans to warm. Notably, over 90% of this trapped heat is absorbed by the oceans. There are signs that crucial circulation patterns are shifting, with growing evidence suggesting that the Atlantic Meridional Overturning Circulation may be slowing down.

Over the last century, reconstructed sea surface temperature data reveal that western boundary currents are heating at double the rate of the global average. These observations indicate that the western boundary currents are likely intensifying due to this change in temperature, and may continue to grow stronger in the near future. There is evidence that surface warming due to anthropogenic climate change has accelerated upper ocean currents in 77% of the global ocean. Specifically, increased vertical stratification due to surface warming intensifies upper ocean currents, while changes in horizontal density gradients caused by differential warming across different ocean regions results in the acceleration of surface zonal currents.

There are suggestions that the Atlantic meridional overturning circulation (AMOC) is in danger of collapsing due to climate change, which would have extreme impacts on the climate of northern Europe and more widely, although this topic is controversial and remains an active area of research. The "State of the cryosphere" report, dedicates significant space to AMOC, saying it may be en route to collapse because of ice melt and water warming. In the same time, the Antarctic Circumpolar Current (ACC) is also slowing down and is expected to lose 20% of its power by the year 2050, "with widespread impacts on ocean circulation and climate". UNESCO mentions that the report in the first time "notes a growing scientific consensus that melting Greenland and Antarctic ice sheets, among other factors, may be slowing important ocean currents at both poles, with potentially dire consequences for a much colder northern Europe and greater sea-level rise along the U.S. East Coast."

In addition to water surface temperatures, the wind systems are a crucial determinant of ocean currents. Wind wave systems influence oceanic heat exchange, the condition of the sea surface, and can alter ocean currents. In the North Atlantic, equatorial Pacific, and Southern Ocean, increased wind speeds as well as significant wave heights have been attributed to climate change and natural processes combined. In the East Australian Current, global warming has also been accredited to increased wind stress curl, which intensifies these currents, and may even indirectly increase sea levels, due to the additional warming created by stronger currents.

As ocean circulation changes due to climate, typical distribution patterns are also changing. The dispersal patterns of marine organisms depend on oceanographic conditions, which as a result, influence the biological composition of oceans. Due to the patchiness of the natural ecological world, dispersal is a species survival mechanism for various organisms. With strengthened boundary currents moving toward the poles, it is expected that some marine species will be redirected to the poles and greater depths. The strengthening or weakening of typical dispersal pathways by increased temperatures are expected to not only impact the survival of native marine species due to inability to replenish their meta populations but also may increase the prevalence of invasive species. In Japanese corals and macroalgae, the unusual dispersal pattern of organisms toward the poles may destabilize native species.

== Economic importance ==
Knowledge of surface ocean currents is essential in reducing costs of shipping, since traveling with them reduces fuel costs. In the wind powered sailing-ship era, knowledge of wind patterns and ocean currents was even more essential. Using ocean currents to help their ships into harbor and using currents such as the gulf stream to get back home. The lack of understanding of ocean currents during that time period is hypothesized to be one of the contributing factors to exploration failure. The Gulf Stream and the Canary current keep western European countries warmer and less variable, while at the same latitude North America's weather was colder. A good example of this is the Agulhas Current (down along eastern Africa), which long prevented sailors from reaching India.

In recent times, around-the-world sailing competitors make good use of surface currents to build and maintain speed. Ocean currents can also be used for marine power generation, with areas of Japan, Florida and Hawaii being considered for test projects. The utilization of currents today can still impact global trade, it can reduce the cost and emissions of shipping vessels.

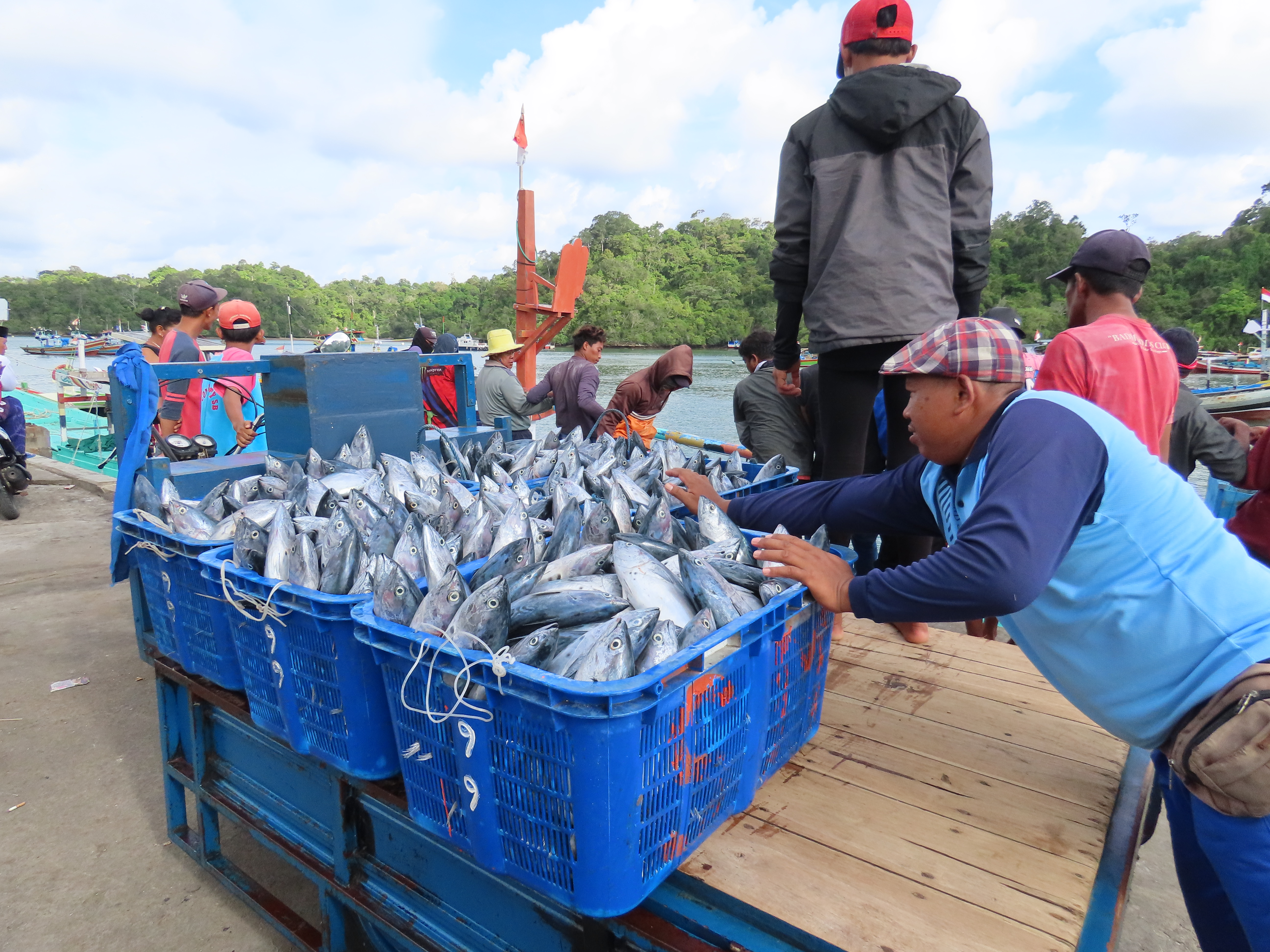
Skipjack tuna fishery in Indonesia.

Ocean currents can also impact the fishing industry, examples of this include the Tsugaru, Oyashio and Kuroshio currents all of which influence the western North Pacific temperature, which has been shown to be a habitat predictor for the Skipjack tuna. It has also been shown that it is not just local currents that can affect a country's economy, but neighboring currents can influence the viability of local fishing industries.

== Distribution ==
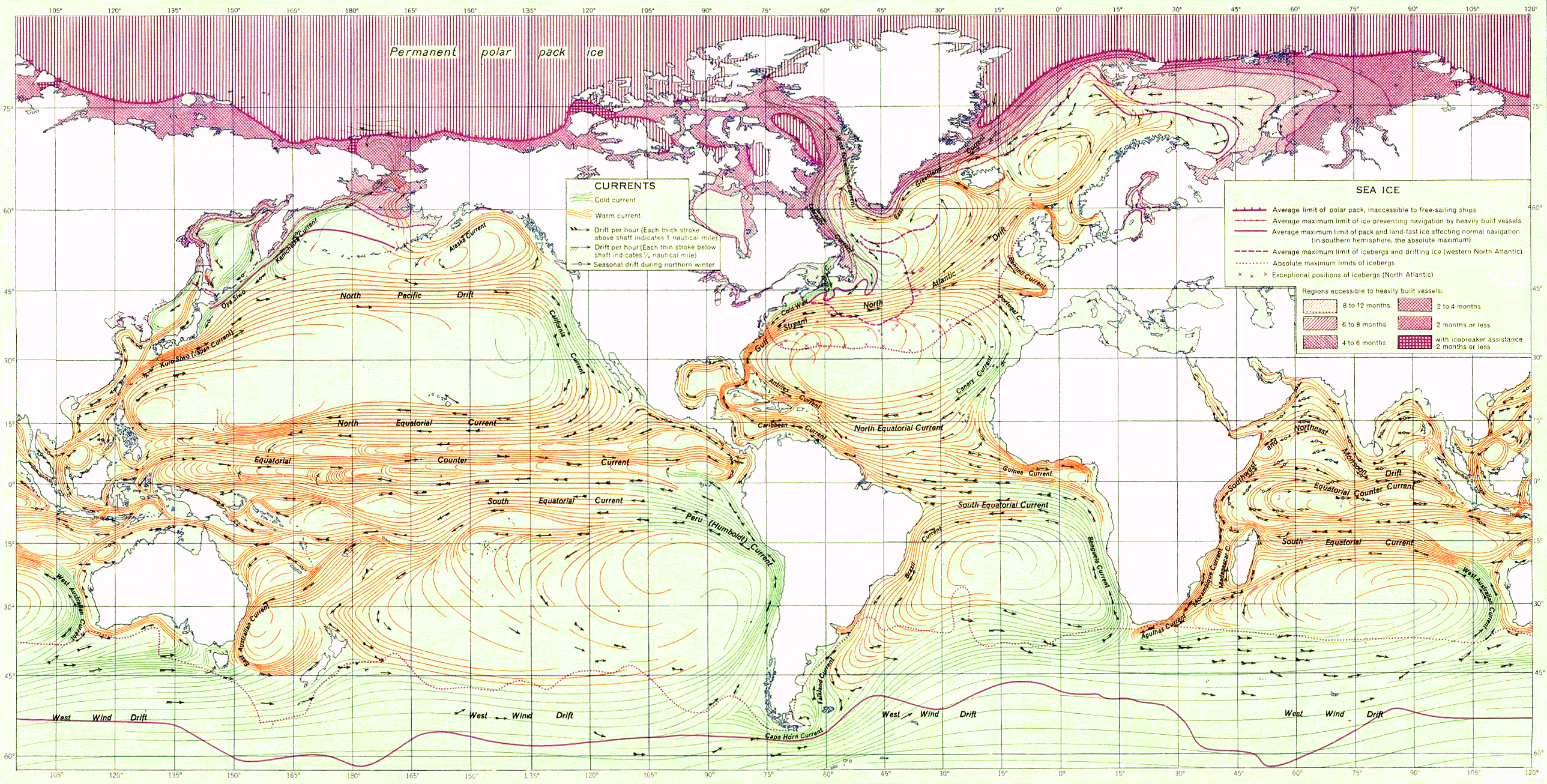
A 1943 map of the world's ocean currents

Currents of the Arctic Ocean

- Baffin Island Current – Arctic Ocean current
- Beaufort Gyre – Wind-driven ocean current in the Arctic Ocean polar region
- East Greenland Current – Current from Fram Strait to Cape Farewell off the eastern coat of Greenland
- East Iceland Current – Cold water ocean current that forms as a branch of the East Greenland Current
- Labrador Current – Western North Atlantic Ocean current
- North Icelandic Jet – Deep-reaching current that flows along the continental slope of Iceland
- Norwegian Current – Current that flows northeasterly along the Atlantic coast of Norway
- Transpolar Drift Stream – Current in the Arctic Ocean
- West Greenland Current – Weak cold water current that flows to the north along the west coast of Greenland
- West Spitsbergen Current – Warm, salty current that runs poleward just west of Spitsbergen

Currents of the Atlantic Ocean

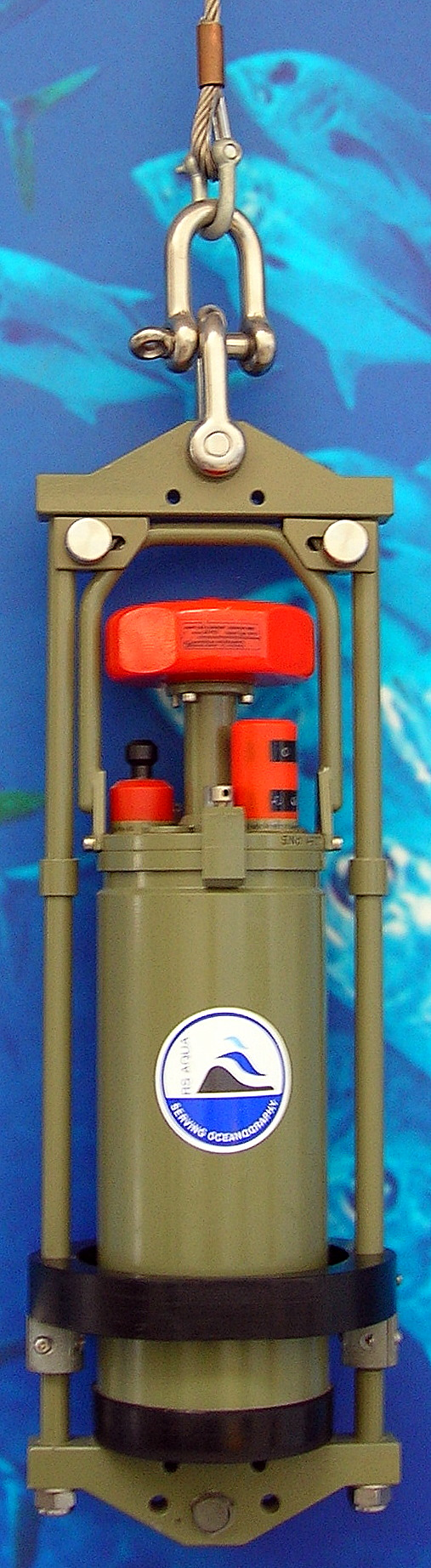
A recording current meter. It records information about currents (speed, direction, depth, temperature).

- Angola Current – Temporary ocean surface current
- Antilles Current – Ocean current
- Atlantic meridional overturning circulation – System of surface and deep currents in the Atlantic Ocean
- Azores Current – Ocean current in the North Atlantic Ocean
- Benguela Current – Ocean current in the South Atlantic
- Brazil Current – Water current along Brazil's southern coast
- Canary Current – Wind-driven surface current that is part of the North Atlantic Gyre
- Cape Horn Current – Cold water current that flows west-to-east around Cape Horn
- Caribbean Current – Atlantic Ocean current
- East Greenland Current – Current from Fram Strait to Cape Farewell off the eastern coat of Greenland
- East Iceland Current – Cold water ocean current that forms as a branch of the East Greenland Current
- Equatorial Counter Current – Shallow eastward flowing current found in the Atlantic, Indian, and Pacific Oceans
- Falkland Current – Northward cold water Atlantic Ocean current
- Florida Current – Thermal ocean current
- Guinea Current – Atlantic warm-water current off West Africa
- Gulf Stream – Warm Atlantic Ocean current
- Irminger Current – North Atlantic ocean current
- Labrador Current – Western North Atlantic Ocean current
- Lomonosov Current – Deep current in the Atlantic Ocean. from the coast of Brazil to the Gulf of Guinea
- Loop Current – Ocean current between Cuba and Yucatán Peninsula
- North Atlantic Current – Current of the Atlantic Ocean
- North Brazil Current – North Atlantic ocean current
- North Equatorial Current – Current in the Pacific and Atlantic Oceans
- Norwegian Current – Current that flows northeasterly along the Atlantic coast of Norway
- Portugal Current – Weak ocean current that flows south along the coast of Portugal
- South Atlantic Current – Eastward ocean current, fed by the Brazil Current
- South Equatorial Current – Ocean current in the Pacific, Atlantic, and Indian Ocean
- West Greenland Current – Weak cold water current that flows to the north along the west coast of Greenland
- West Spitsbergen Current – Warm, salty current that runs poleward just west of Spitsbergen

Currents of the Indian Ocean

- Agulhas Current – Southwest Indian Ocean current off Africa's east coast
- Agulhas Return Current – Ocean current in the southern Indian Ocean
- East Madagascar Current – Oceanic flow feature near Madagascar
- Equatorial Counter Current – Shallow eastward flowing current found in the Atlantic, Indian, and Pacific Oceans
- Indian Monsoon Current – Seasonally-varying ocean current regime in the northern Indian Ocean
- Indonesian Throughflow – Ocean current
- Leeuwin Current – Ocean current off Western Australia
- Madagascar Current – Ocean current in the West Indian Ocean
- Mozambique Current – Warm ocean current in the Indian Ocean
- North Madagascar Current – Ocean current near Madagascar that flows into the South Equatorial Current
- Somali Current – Boundary current in the Indian Ocean
- South Equatorial Current – Ocean current in the Pacific, Atlantic, and Indian Ocean
- Southwest Madagascar Coastal Current – Warm poleward ocean current flowing in the south-west of Madagascar
- West Australian Current – Cool oceanic current

Currents of the Pacific Ocean

- Alaska Current – Warm-water current west of North America
- Aleutian Current – Eastward-flowing ocean current which lies north of the North Pacific Current;
- California Current – Pacific Ocean current
- Cape Horn Current – Cold water current that flows west-to-east around Cape Horn
- Cromwell Current – Eastward-flowing subsurface current in the Pacific Ocean
- Davidson Current – Countercurrent of the Pacific Ocean
- East Australian Current – Currents of the Pacific Ocean
- East Korea Warm Current – Ocean current in the Sea of Japan
- Equatorial Counter Current – Shallow eastward flowing current found in the Atlantic, Indian, and Pacific Oceans
- Humboldt Current – Current of the Pacific Ocean
- Indonesian Throughflow – Ocean current
- Kamchatka Current – Pacific Ocean current
- Kuroshio Current – North-flowing current in the northwest Pacific Ocean
- Mindanao Current – Narrow, southward-flowing ocean current along the southeastern coast of the Philippines
- Mindanao Eddy – Semi-permanent cold-ring ocean eddy near the Philippines
- North Equatorial Current – Current in the Pacific and Atlantic Oceans
- North Korea Cold Current – Cold water current in the Sea of Japan
- North Pacific Current – Ocean current, Japan to British Columbia
- Oyashio Current – Cold subarctic ocean current in the Pacific Ocean
- South Equatorial Current – Ocean current in the Pacific, Atlantic, and Indian Ocean
- Subtropical Countercurrent – Narrow eastward ocean current in the central North Pacific Ocean
- Tasman Front – Pacific Ocean current
- Tasman Outflow – Current between the Pacific Ocean and the Indian Ocean

Currents of the Southern Ocean

- Antarctic Circumpolar Current – Ocean current that flows clockwise from west to east around Antarctica
- Tasman Outflow – Current between the Pacific Ocean and the Indian Ocean
- Kerguelen deep western boundary current

Oceanic gyres

- Beaufort Gyre – Wind-driven ocean current in the Arctic Ocean polar region
- Indian Ocean Gyre – Major oceanic gyre in the Indian Ocean
- North Atlantic Gyre – Major circular system of ocean currents
- North Pacific Gyre – Major circulating system of ocean currents
- Ross Gyre – Circulating system of ocean currents in the Ross Sea
- South Atlantic Gyre – Subtropical gyre in the south Atlantic Ocean
- South Pacific Gyre – Major circulating system of ocean currents
- Weddell Gyre – One of two gyres within the Southern Ocean

== See also ==
- Currentology – Science that studies the internal movements of water masses
- Deep ocean water – Cold, salty water deep below the surface of Earth's oceans
- Fish migration – Movement of fishes from one part of a water body to another on a regular basis
- Geostrophic current – Oceanic flow in which the pressure gradient force is balanced by the Coriolis effect
- Latitude of the Gulf Stream and the Gulf Stream north wall index
- List of ocean circulation models
- Marine habitats § Ocean currents
- Marine current power – Extraction of power from ocean currents
- Ocean gyre – Any large system of circulating ocean surface currents
- Physical oceanography – Study of physical conditions and processes within the ocean
- Subsurface ocean current – Oceanic currents that flow beneath surface currents
- Thermohaline circulation – Part of large-scale ocean circulation
- Tidal current – Flow of water induced by astronomical gravitational effects
- Volta do mar – Archaic navigational technique
