= South Atlantic Current =

Eastward ocean current, fed by the Brazil Current

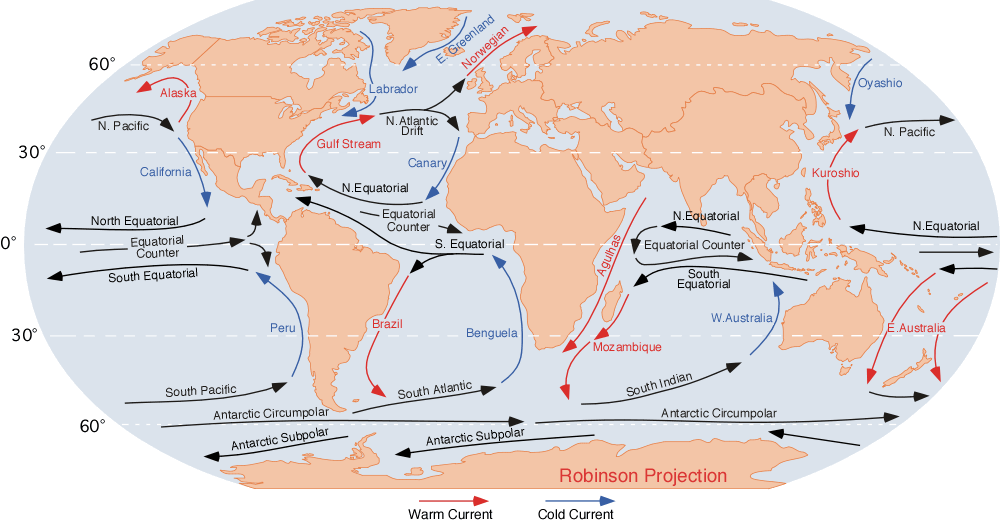
Earth's major ocean currents

The South Atlantic Current (SAC) is a cold, eastward ocean current which forms the southern part of the South Atlantic Gyre. It is fed by the Brazil Current, and the fraction of it which reaches the African coast feeds the Benguela Current. Its surface velocity is about 0.2 m/s and its average volume transport is about 30 Sverdrups, both being higher in the western portion and decreasing to the east. It is continuous with the northern edge of the Antarctic Circumpolar Current (ACC). The SAC and ACC are distinguished by the subtropical front, a boundary at approximately 40°S where sea surface temperature and salinity decrease sharply from north to south.

The seafaring is usually easier and thus safer in area of the South Atlantic Current than in the Antarctic Circumpolar Current, though also slower.

== See also ==
- Antarctic Circumpolar Current
- Ocean current
- Oceanic gyres
- Physical oceanography
