= Kamchatka Current =

Pacific Ocean current

The Kamchatka Current is a cold-water current flowing southwestward in the Bering Sea, along the Siberian Kamchatka Peninsula. It receives water from the Bering Slope Current. A portion of this current then becomes the Oyashio Current while the remainder joins the warmer North Pacific Current.

== See also ==
- Ocean current – Directional mass flow of oceanic water
- Ocean gyre – Any large system of circulating ocean surface currents
- Physical oceanography – Study of physical conditions and processes within the ocean
