= Aleutian Current =

Eastward-flowing ocean current which lies north of the North Pacific Current;

Aleutian Current is also called the "Subarctic Current". An eastward flowing ocean current which lies north of the North Pacific Current; it is the northern branch of the Kuroshio Current which moves northeast then east between 40° N and 50° N. As it approaches the coast of North America it divides to form the northward-flowing Alaska Current and the southward-flowing California Current .

== See also ==
- Ocean current – Directional mass flow of oceanic water
- Ocean gyre – Any large system of circulating ocean surface currents
- Physical oceanography – Study of physical conditions and processes within the ocean
