= Tasman Outflow =

Current between the Pacific Ocean and the Indian Ocean

The Tasman Outflow is a water pathway connecting water from the Pacific Ocean and the Indian Ocean. The existence of the outflow was published by scientists of the Australian CSIRO's Division of Marine and Atmospheric Research team in August 2007, interpreting salinity and temperature data captured from 1950 to 2002. The Tasman Outflow is seen as the missing link in the supergyre of the Southern Hemisphere and an important part of the thermohaline circulation.

== Features ==
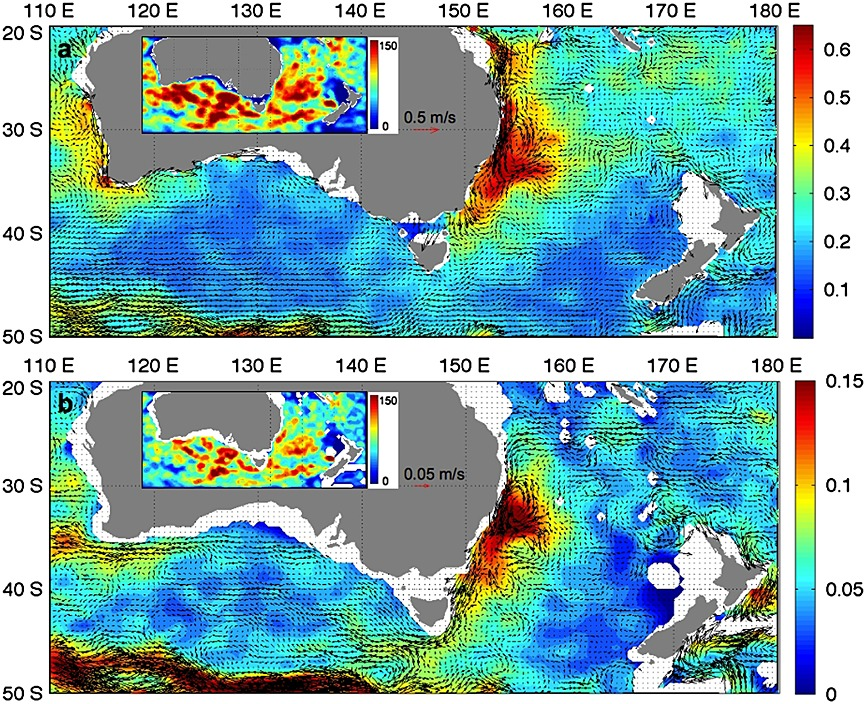
Mean current speed (color‐coded, m s−1) and current velocity vectors near Australia, both at (a) the sea surface and (b) 1000 dbar. The inset illustrates the available number of data point for each 0.5° × 0.5° cell element.

The source of the water of the Tasman Outflow is the East Australian Current. Until 2007, it was assumed that the water of this current moved in a southeastern direction towards New Zealand. However, this eastward turn toward New Zealand only occurred close to the surface, as was confirmed by the use of Argo floats at the sea surface and at a depth of 1000 dbar. At intermediate depth -around 300 to 1000 meter- the water actually turns south and westward, moving around the south of Tasmania. This water, which escapes from the East Australian Current and moves past Tasmania, is called the Tasman Outflow. The current moves further westward past the Great Australian Bight and into the Indian Ocean. In this way, the Tasman Outflow links the South Pacific Ocean to the Indian Ocean. Due to its depth, the current mainly transports Subantarctic Mode Water and Antarctic Intermediate Water with a volume transport of 4.2 ± 4.3 Sv. Here Sv stands for Sverdrup, a measure for volumetransport in the ocean. The current is limited to a narrow path between Tasmania and the Antarctic circumpolar current, due to the strong eastward Antarctic Circumpolar Current to the south of Tasmania.

== Role in the thermohaline circulation ==
Before the discovery of the Tasman Outflow, research on the thermohaline circulation in the Southern Hemisphere was mainly focused on two other routes. One of them is known as the cold route, which moves through the Drake Passage and transports cold water deep in the ocean around Antarctica into the Pacific and Indian Ocean. The other is known as the warm route, which moves through the Indonesian Throughflow and transports warm water into the Indian Ocean. With the Tasman Outflow there is a third route of the thermohaline circulation with Subantarctic Mode Water and Antarctic Intermediate Water transport from the Pacific to the North Atlantic. Furthermore, the Tasman Outflow functions as the second gateway for Pacific waters to reach the Indian Ocean, besides the Indonesian Throughflow.

At the equatorial Atlantic the Tasman Outflow's contribution is even comparable to that of the other two better known routes with a volume transport of approximately 3 Sv. The Tasman Outflow is seen as a third route since the water flow does not come into contact with the other two routes as it underrides both of them in depth. It is colder, less saline and denser than the other two routes, which is caused by the fresh input from the Antarctic Intermediate Water in the South Pacific. The waterflow to which the Tasman Outflow contributes, is almost entirely situated below a depth of 300 meter. Influences from outside stay limited because of its situation well below the mixed layer, causing its salinity and temperature to vary little.

== Role in the Southern Hemisphere supergyre ==
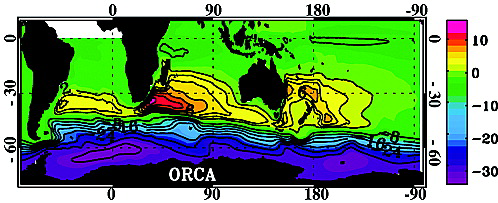
Horizontal streamfunction displaying the complete Atlantic‐to‐Atlantic Tasman water roundtrip, shown here for ORCA. Contour interval is 1 Sv, the stream function value has been set to zero in Tasmania. The patterns reveal a horizontal view of the quasi‐total THC cell.

The Tasman Outflow was the missing link in research on the Southern Hemispheric supergyre. This supergyre is hypothesized to connect all three southern basin gyres, namely the South Pacific Gyre, the Indian Ocean Gyre and the South Atlantic Gyre. The water in this supergyre originates from the Antarctic zone as Subantarctic Mode Water. It moves in an eastward direction around Antarctica within the Antarctic Circumpolar Current. Within this current, the Subantarctic Mode Water is partially converted to Antarctic Intermediate Water. When the water reaches the South Pacific, the water is included in the South Pacific Gyre System close to New Zealand. Here, the gyre is provided with fresh water below the thermocline. Before moving on to the Tasman Outflow, the water can flow through large parts of the Pacific basin. Eventually, the East Australian Current picks up the water and moves it further southwards, where it rounds the south of Tasmania to the west and through the Tasman Outflow ends up in the Indian Ocean. In the east of the Indian Ocean, the Tasman flow stays below 15S and between 300 and 1100 meters deep. After reaching the west of the Indian Ocean, the flow meets the Agulhas current where it is partly inverted towards the east and partly passing through to the South Atlantic Ocean, closing the circle of the supergyre.

== Role in the climate system ==
The thermohaline circulation is important for our climate system; this is equally true for the Tasman Outflow addition to the thermohaline circulation. When compared to the Drake Passage and Indonesian Throughflow routes, the Tasman outflow endures fewer influences from outside. Its exposition to air, just as other sea interactions, is limited since it rarely comes into contact with the oceanic mixed layer. As a result, its temperature and salinity stay mostly conserved throughout its way to the North Atlantic where it comes to the surface. It thus functions as a stable and constant supply of fresh water, which could work to counteract the changing heat transport in the thermohaline circulation.

The wind also seems to play an important role in the size of the contribution of the Tasman Outflow. Before being injected into the South Pacific subtropical gyre system and subsequently into the Tasman Outflow, the water has travelled many times around Antarctica. The wind forcing driving this circulation therefore has an outsize influence on the freshwater transport into the Atlantic. Besides, it is thought to control the stability and functioning of the thermohaline circulation. The Tasman Outflow is also directly influenced by wind forcing, especially by winds in the Southern and Pacific Ocean. These winds have an effect on the extent of the outflow, since it reduces in size when the Subtropical Front shifts towards the north. However, no evidence of any seasonality has been found. Although measurements show large variations in the size of the outflow, from 1 Sv to more than 25 Sv on both sub-weekly and inter-annual scales, no long-term trends were found over the period of 1983 to 1997.
