= Madagascar Current =

Ocean current in the West Indian Ocean

The Madagascar current is an oceanic current in the west Indian Ocean.

The Madagascar current is split into two currents – the North Madagascar Current and the East Madagascar Current. The south easterly trade winds, the South Equatorial Current and the South Indian Ocean flow westward when it reaches Madagascar's east coast the flow splits into the North and South Madagascar Currents. Both currents redistribute mass and heat along the stream current system along Madagascar's coast. The North Madagascar Current flows into the South Equatorial Current just north of Madagascar and is directed into the Mozambique Channel, this connects to the gyre's equatorial currents into the Agulhas Current off the coast of Southeastern Africa.

The Northern Indian Ocean lies within a large anticyclonic supergyre, northern Madagascar lies between this gyre and a cyclonic gyre in the northern Indian Ocean. There are eddies that originate in the Mozambique Channel and in the southern region of Madagascar that can affect the timing of the ring formation of the retroflection of the Agulhas Current.

== See also ==
- Ocean current
- Oceanic gyres
- Physical oceanography
