= Alaska Current =

Warm-water current west of North America

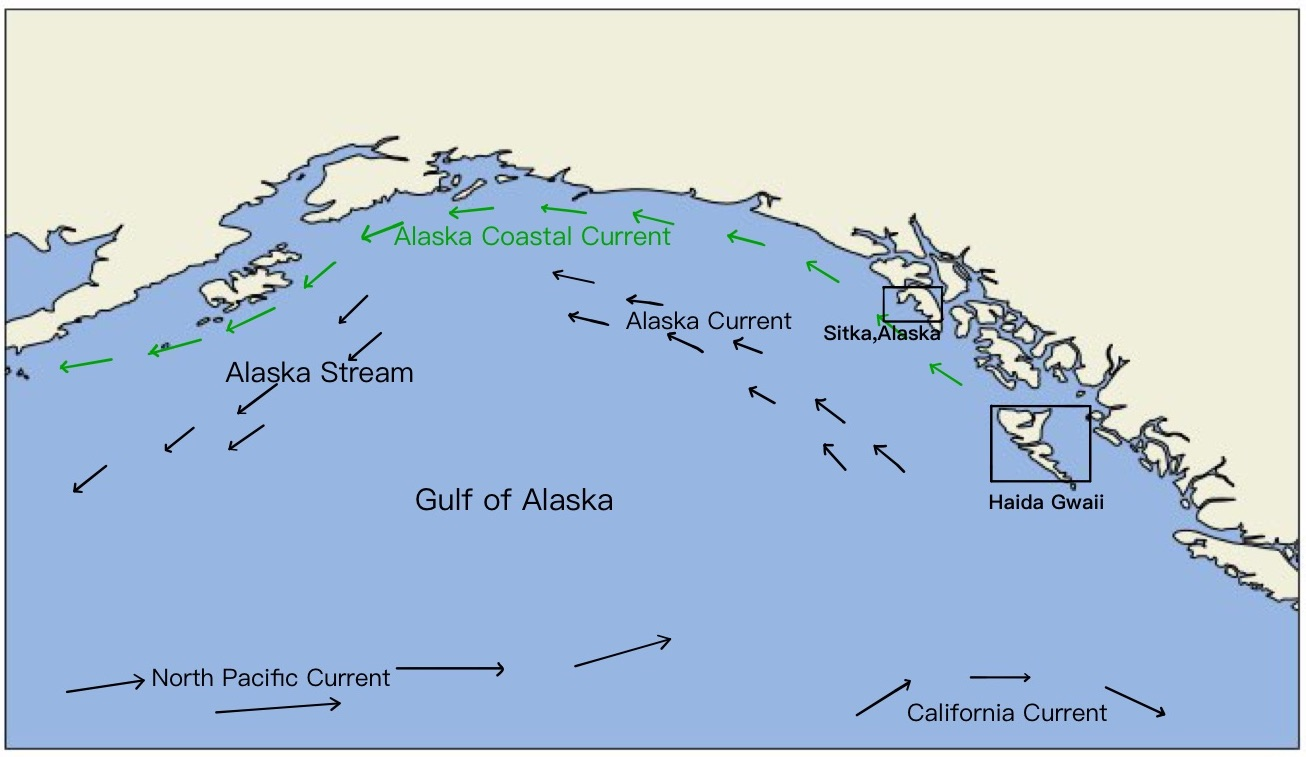
Schematic of the Gulf of Alaska coastal area with Alaska Current, Alaskan Stream and Alaska Coastal Currents. The Alaska Current flows northward along the west coast of North America. It turns westward at the highest point of the Gulf of Alaska.

The Alaska Current is a southwestern shallow warm-water current alongside the west coast of the North American continent beginning at about 48-50°N. The Alaska Current produces large clockwise eddies at two sites: west of Haida Gwaii ("Haida Eddies") and west of Sitka, Alaska ("Sitka Eddy").

== Track ==
The Alaska current results from the northward diversion of a portion of the North Pacific Current. The North Pacific Current provides energy for the California Current and the Alaska Current. It forms a part of the Alaska Current and continues into the Alaskan Stream, which begins near Kodiak Island and flows southwestward along the Alaska Peninsula. A part of the Alaskan Stream turns southward and becomes part of the recirculation of the North Pacific Ocean Current, thus completing the loop of the Alaska Gyre.

== Physical properties ==
The Gulf of Alaska coastal area includes the offshore Alaska Current, Alaskan Stream, Alaska Coastal Current and some eddies. In the eastern part of the Gulf of Alaska, the Alaska Current flows counterclockwise, and it is relatively wide (> 100 km) meandering and slow (3–6 m/min). The water of Alaska Current is characterized by temperatures above 39 °F (4 °C). Usually, the Alaska Current contains large mesoscale vortices, which help to transfer energy and water from the ocean boundary into the interior of ocean. It turns into the Alaska Stream west of Kodiak Island where it becomes narrows (< 60 km) and its speed increases (1 m/s). The Alaska Coastal Current is located in the inner third of the continental shelf and it is driven by along-shore winds and freshwater influx. It has a typical width of about 30 km, the depth is 100–200 m, and the velocity is > 1 m/s. The mean transport is about 0.6 Sv and its seasonal variation is about 0.2 Sv.

Winds and precipitation can both affect the Alaska Current. Winds are downwelling along the coastal area most of the year, which helps to keep the density contrast between central Gulf of Alaska water and fresher, lower density water on the shelf. The coastal current in the Gulf of Alaska is strongly baroclinic. Precipitation and coastal runoff reduce the water density on the shelf. Due to the baroclinic density field, the Alaska current is highly sheared vertically, and the cross-current density gradient is reflected by the offshore salinity gradient. The surface salinities are less than 30 PSU (Practical Salinity Unit) at the coastal areas, more than 31 PSU on the shelf, and more than 32.5 PSU in the central Gulf of Alaska. The mean transport of the baroclinic current near Kodiak Island in the western gulf of Alaska is approximately 10 Sv in the upper 1500 m.

The Alaska Current, together with the Gulf of Alaska, has an impact on the climate system of the southwestern United States, including seasonal rainfall and snow. It has been shown that El Niño affects the west coast through atmospheric as well as oceanic route. During an El Niño, surface transport in the Alaska Gyre strengthens. In the Alaska Current system, 7– 8 months after El Niño occurred on the equator, an anomaly of subsurface temperature larger than 1.5 °C was found along the coast.

== Productivity ==
Despite the dominance of downwelling-favorable winds, the water overlying the northern coast of the Gulf of Alaska has achieved high biological productivity. Several physical processes enhance its nutrient supply and primary productivity. Nutrients can be transported to the northern part of the Gulf of Alaska through advection, river discharge, estuarine circulation, tidal mixing, mesoscale eddy formation and transport, sediment resuspension, the relaxation of summer downwelling winds, Ekman transport of surface water from the central Gulf of Alaska basin onto the shelf during winter. This is important for marine mammals, fish and birds. The productivity in the Alaska Current System supports some of the nation's largest fisheries and large numbers of birds and mammals.

== Effects of climate change ==
Current climate models predict that the climate in the Gulf of Alaska will change drastically in the coming decades. The northern Gulf of Alaska maintains an efficient ecosystem, but the distribution and abundance of living marine resources are expected to be significantly affected by changes in water temperature, changes in sea ice coverage, and ocean acidification.

The mean sea surface temperature is expected to increase. Model projections indicate that most of the North Pacific will have warmed by an average of 1.2-1.8 °C by 2050. Precipitation is likely to increase, and the amount of rainfall will exceed the amount of snowfall. Glaciers near the northern coast of the Gulf of Alaska are melting at an unprecedented rate. Climate models predict that by 2050, glacial river runoff from Alaska rivers will increase by 40%. More precipitation and glacial melting will add more fresh water to coastal areas, which will strengthen the baroclinic structure on the continental shelf. Coastal regions around Alaska are experiencing the most rapid and extensive ocean acidification. Higher ocean acidity can damage shellfish and certain types of plankton, and fewer plankton means less food available to support for fish and some other species.

== See also ==
- Ocean current – Directional mass flow of oceanic water
- Ocean gyre – Any large system of circulating ocean surface currents
- Physical oceanography – Study of physical conditions and processes within the ocean
- Gulf of Alaska – Arm of the Pacific Ocean
- California Current – Pacific Ocean current
