= North Madagascar Current =

Ocean current near Madagascar that flows into the South Equatorial Current

The North Madagascar Current is an ocean current near Madagascar. The Madagascar current is split into two currents: the North Madagascar Current and the East Madagascar Current (EMC). The North Madagascar Current (NMC) flows into the South Equatorial Current just north of Madagascar and is directed into the Mozambique Channel, this connects to the gyre's equatorial currents into the Agulhas Current off the coast of Southeastern Africa.

== See also ==
- Ocean current
- Oceanic gyres
- Physical oceanography
