= Southwest Madagascar Coastal Current =

Warm poleward ocean current flowing in the south-west of Madagascar

The Southwest Madagascar Coastal Current (SMACC) is a warm poleward ocean current flowing in the south-west of Madagascar.

== Discovery ==
The upwelling region south of Madagascar, an important conveyor of nutrients for marine wildlife and fisheries off the coast of Madagascar, was found to be primarily wind-driven, but also influenced by a poleward eastern boundary flow coming from the Mozambique Channel. The system was subsequently identified as a previously unrecognized current. The current was likely not recognized as such before 2018 because the oceanic region in question has only been subject to relatively light oceanographic sampling so far.

== Characteristics ==
The SMACC is a rare example of a subtropical surface current flowing opposite to the dominant winds off the western coast of a continent or a large island, like Madagascar.

SMACC’s average length is about 500 kilometers and its average width ranges between 50 and 100 kilometers. It extends from the surface to a depth of about 150 meters upstream and about 70 meters downstream. The SMACC extends from 22°S (upstream) to 26.4°S (downstream). The water masses of the SMACC have high salinity characteristics of Subtropical Surface Waters.

Driven by wind stress curl, the SMACC flows faster in summer and is reduced in winter, maintaining an average speed of 20 cm/s. Its average volume transport is about 1.3 Sverdrup with a mean summer maximum of 2.1 Sverdrup. Cyclonic eddies generated at the south of Madagascar could also contribute to the intensification of the downstream of the SMACC.

The intrusion of warm waters from the Mozambique Channel may reduce the upwelling at the south of Madagascar surface signature during the austral summer season. Intensification of wind stress curl could favor the intrusion of the SMACC toward the upwelling system. Consequently, the intensification of the wind stress curl enhances the transport of warm water, carried by the SMACC, reduces the surface signature of the upwelling, and influences the phytoplankton response associated with that upwelling.

The interaction between the SMACC and the coastal upwelling could influence the local fisheries productivity and larval transport patterns, as well as the connectivity with the Agulhas Current, affecting the returning branch of the global overturning circulation.
