= Florida Current =

Thermal ocean current

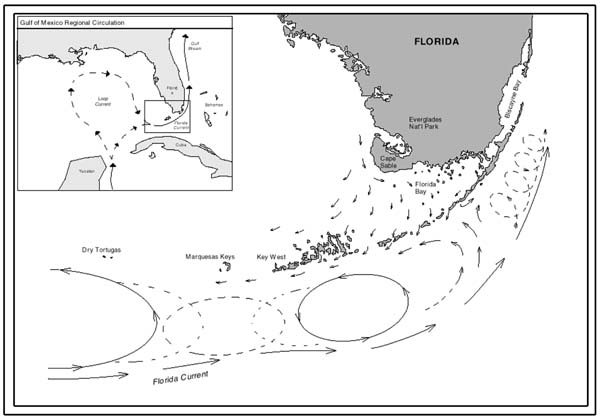
Map of the Florida Current

The Florida Current is a thermal ocean current that flows from the Straits of Florida around the Florida Peninsula and along the southeastern coast of the United States before joining the Gulf Stream Current near Cape Hatteras. Its contributing currents are the Loop Current and the Antilles Current. The current was discovered by Spanish explorer Juan Ponce de León in 1513.

The Florida Current results from the movement of water pushed from the Atlantic into the Caribbean Sea by the rotation of the Earth (which exerts a greater force at the equator). The water piles up along Central America and flows northward through the Yucatán Channel into the Gulf of Mexico. The water is heated in the Gulf and forced out through the Florida Straits, between the Florida Keys in Hawk Channel and Cuba and flows northward along the east coast of the United States. The Florida Current is often referred to imprecisely as the Gulf Stream. In fact, the Florida Current joins the Gulf Stream off the east coast of Florida.

== Transport ==
The Florida Current has an estimated mean transport of 30 Sv, varying seasonally and interannually by as much as 10 Sv. The volume transport increases as it flows farther north, reaching its maximum transport of 85 Sv near Cape Hatteras. The water reaches a velocity of 1.8 metres per second (3.5 kn).

=== Seasonal variation ===
The seasonal variation of the Florida Current is relatively understudied. Seasonal variability in transports and eddies has been more intensely studied in the nearby Gulf Stream. Past research indicates The Florida current reaches a maximum transport in July and a minimum transport in October, with a subsequent secondary maximum and minimum occurring in January and April, respectively. Shorter variations in the transport may last between 2 and 20 days depending on wind current patterns, and are shortest during the summer months. Therefore, the effects of the seasonal variability of the Florida Current on the wider reaching Gulf Stream is unknown. Wind speed, wind direction, topography, and temperature are important factors in determining current strength. Seasonal variation of weather in the South Florida region can help predict seasonal variability of current strength and transport. Stronger winds and higher temperatures lead to increased current flow due to the increase of the energy added into the system. Inversely, less wind speed and colder temperatures slow down currents and transport is typically lower. However, the Florida Current is formed in the Gulf of Mexico by the Yucatán Current and Gulf of Mexico Loop Current and is important to monitor to determine flux in seasonal variations at the formation of the current.

== Spatial scale ==
Like transport, the spatial magnitude of the current increases along its course. At 27°N, it has a width of 80 km (50 mi); it gradually increases from 120 km (75 mi) at 29°N to 145 km (90 mi) where it flows into the Gulf Stream at 73°W.

== See also ==
- Ocean current
- Oceanic gyre
- Physical oceanography
