= East Iceland Current =

Cold water ocean current that forms as a branch of the East Greenland Current

The East Iceland Current (EIC) is a cold water ocean current that forms east of Greenland at 72°N, 11°W as a branch of the East Greenland Current that merges with the Irminger Current flowing southward until it meets the northeast part of Iceland. It quickly rotates in a counterclockwise direction and flows eastward along the Iceland-Faeroe Ridge before turning north and flowing into the Norwegian Sea. The EIC flows at an average rate of 6 centimeters per second, with a maximum velocity of 10 centimeters per second occurring as the current turns eastward.

== The Iceland-Faeroe Front ==
As the current moves south ward along the eastern edge of Iceland, the minimally dense EIC comes into contact with dense, northward moving Atlantic water. When they collide, their different densities prevent them from mixing, so they move eastward along the Iceland-Faeroe Ridge which connects both island masses. The Ridge further prevents mixing of the water masses due to it being within 500 meters of the surface at its lowest point, and producing the Iceland-Faeroe Front. A subsurface profile shows that the front is located almost directly on top of the ridge and does not move large distances. The ridge is quite jagged and irregular, causing the current have small extrusions that follow the bathymetry of the sea floor into the Atlantic water. These extrusions are most pronounced within 100 meters of the surface but can be tracked down to 400 meters. Once the EIC begins to move northward, the front will stay at the western edge of it, assuring there is no mixing of the Arctic and Atlantic waters. The front may move eastward and westward, depending on the volume of water that the EIC contains at the time.

== Sea Surface Ice ==
Ice formation in the EIC is highly dependent on the salinity of the water that flows into it. The water that flows southward is fresh and very cold (typically 1 °C - 3 °C), while northward flowing water from the Atlantic is warmer(4 °C - 11 °C) and saltier. Ice will only form at the top layers of the EIC if the salinity is at most 34.7 psu. This causes the water to not be very dense, and will freeze more readily. If the salinity is above 34.8 psu, the water will be too dense to freeze.
