= Cape Horn Current =

Cold water current that flows west-to-east around Cape Horn

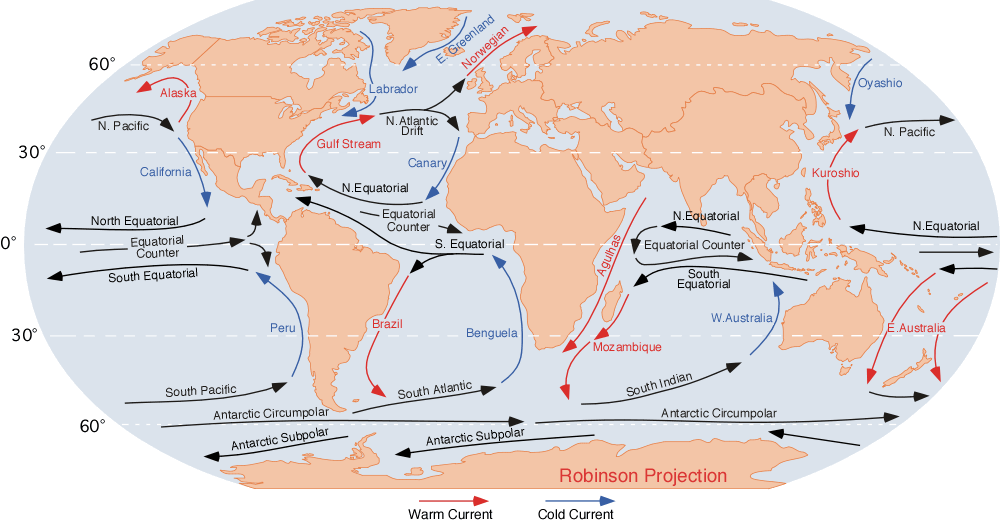
Map of the Earth's major ocean currents.

The Cape Horn Current is a cold water current that flows west-to-east around Cape Horn caused by the intensification of the West Wind Drift as it rounds the cape.

== See also ==
- Ocean current – Directional mass flow of oceanic water
- Ocean gyre – Any large system of circulating ocean surface currents
