= Irminger Current =

North Atlantic ocean current

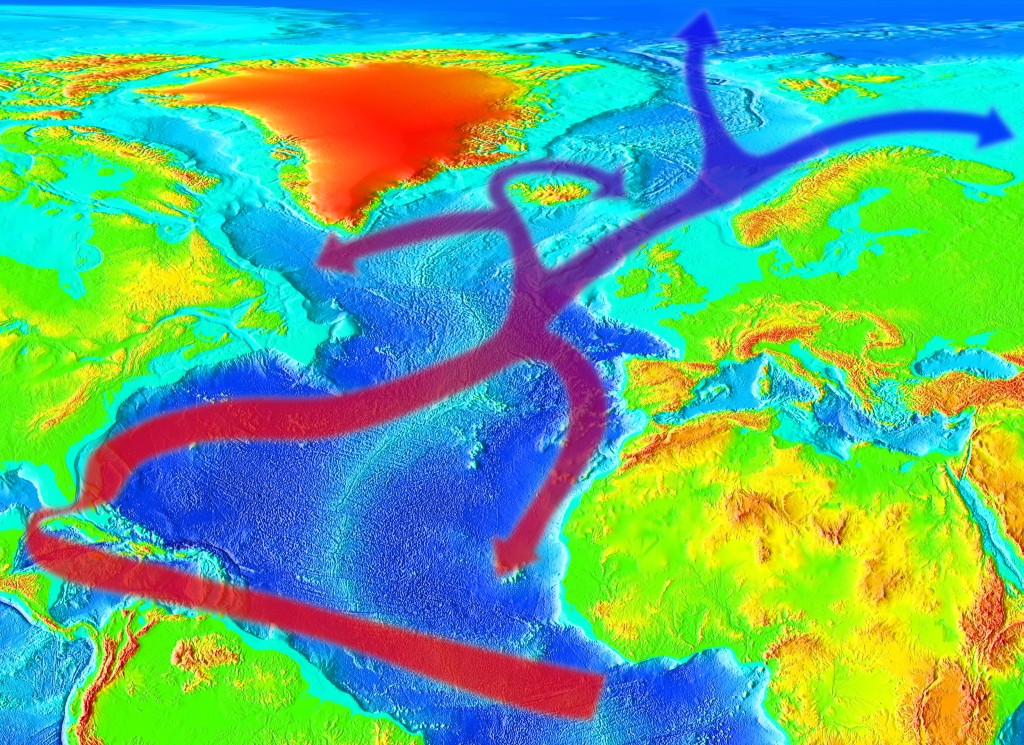
The gulf stream

The Irminger Current is a north Atlantic ocean current setting westward off the southwest coast of Iceland. It is composed of relatively warm and saline waters from the eastern North Atlantic that are fed by the North Atlantic Drift. The Irminger Current is part of the North Atlantic subpolar gyre. The current is named after Danish vice-admiral Carl Ludvig Christian Irminger (1802–1888).

== See also ==
- Irminger Sea
- Ocean currents
- Oceanic gyres
- Physical oceanography
