= Currentology =

Science that studies the internal movements of water masses

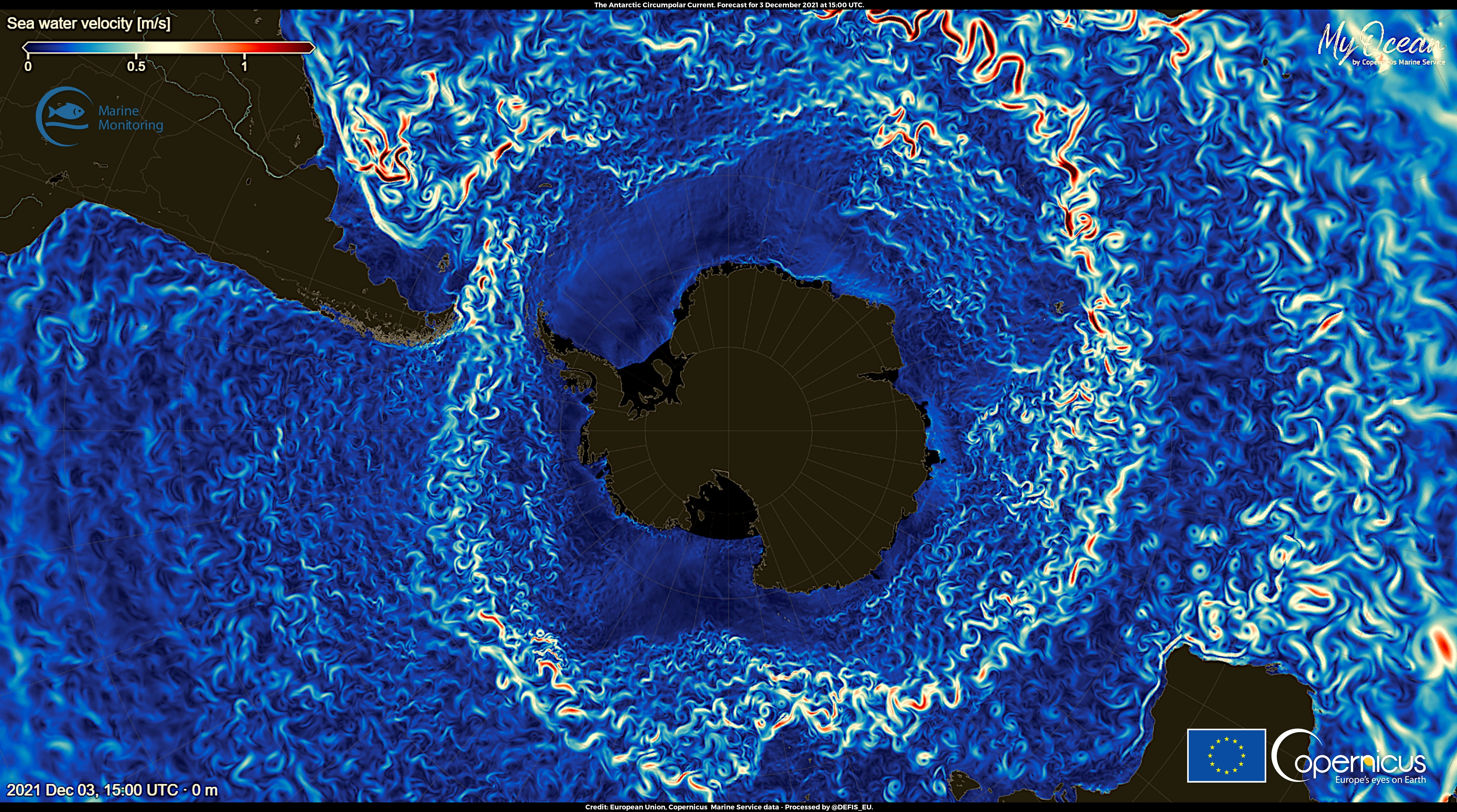
The Antarctic Circumpolar Current (ACC) is the only ocean current that circumnavigates the planet. According to a new scientific paper published in the Nature Climate Change scientific journal, the ACC is speeding up as result of climate change. This image depicts the ocean currents around Antarctica which are concurrent with the ACC. The data have been modelled by the Copernicus Marine Environment Monitoring Service and show the forecast for 3 December 2021 at 15:00 UTC. The Copernicus Marine Environment Monitoring Service (CMEMS) provides oceanographic products and services for maritime safety, coastal and marine environment monitoring, climate and weather forecasting, and marine resource uses. The CMEMS portfolio includes more than 170 products that are obtained using a combination of in situ ocean observations, remote sensing satellite images provided by Copernicus missions, and ocean forecast models which are updated daily.

Currentology is a science that studies the internal movements of water masses.

== Description ==
In the study of fluid mechanics, researchers attempt to give a correct explanation of marine currents. Currents are caused by external driving forces such as wind, gravitational effects, coriolis forces and physical differences between various water masses, the main parameter being the difference of density that varies in function of the temperature and salinity.

The study of currents, combined with other factors such as tides and waves is relevant for understanding marine hydrodynamics and linked processes such as sediment transport and climate balance.

== The measurement of maritime currents ==
The measurements of maritime currents can be made according to different techniques:

- current meter
- diversion buoys

== See also ==
- Ocean current – Directional mass flow of oceanic water
- Fluid dynamics – Aspects of fluid mechanics involving fluid flow
