= South Atlantic Gyre =

Subtropical gyre in the south Atlantic Ocean

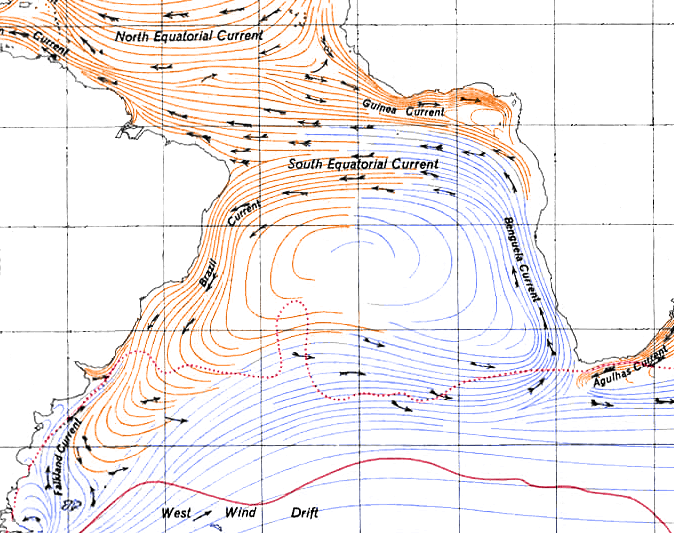
The South Atlantic Gyre (1943)

The ocean currents and gyres of Earth, based on a "dolphins perspective" with flow direction (warm in red, cold in blue)

The South Atlantic Gyre is the subtropical gyre in the south Atlantic Ocean. In the southern portion of the gyre, northwesterly (or southeastward-flowing) winds drive eastward-flowing currents that are difficult to distinguish from the northern boundary of the Antarctic Circumpolar Current. Like other oceanic gyres, it collects vast amounts of floating debris as a garbage patch.

== Southern boundary ==
South of this gyre is the Antarctic Circumpolar Current. This current flows from West to East around Antarctica. Another name for this current is the West Wind Drift. This current allows Antarctica to maintain its huge ice sheet by keeping warm ocean waters away. At approximately 125 Sv, this current is the largest ocean current.

== Western boundary ==
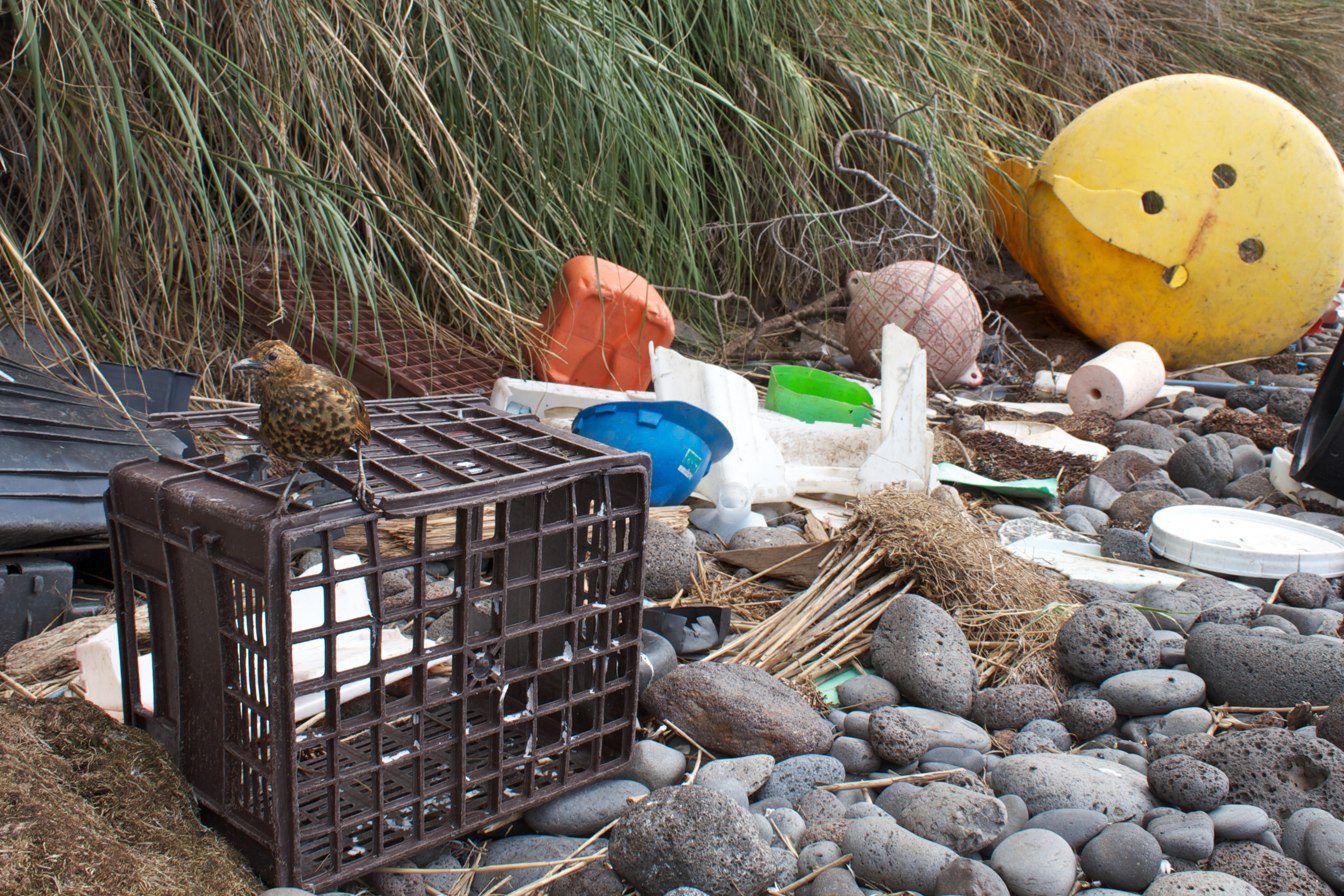
A tristan thrush on Inaccessible Island, strewn with oceanic trash.

The Brazil Current is the western boundary current of the gyre. It flows south along the Brazilian coast to the Rio de la Plata. The current is considerably weaker than its North Atlantic counterpart, the Gulf Stream.

== See also ==
- Ocean current
- Ocean gyre
- Volta do mar
