= Oyashio Current =

Cold subarctic ocean current in the Pacific Ocean

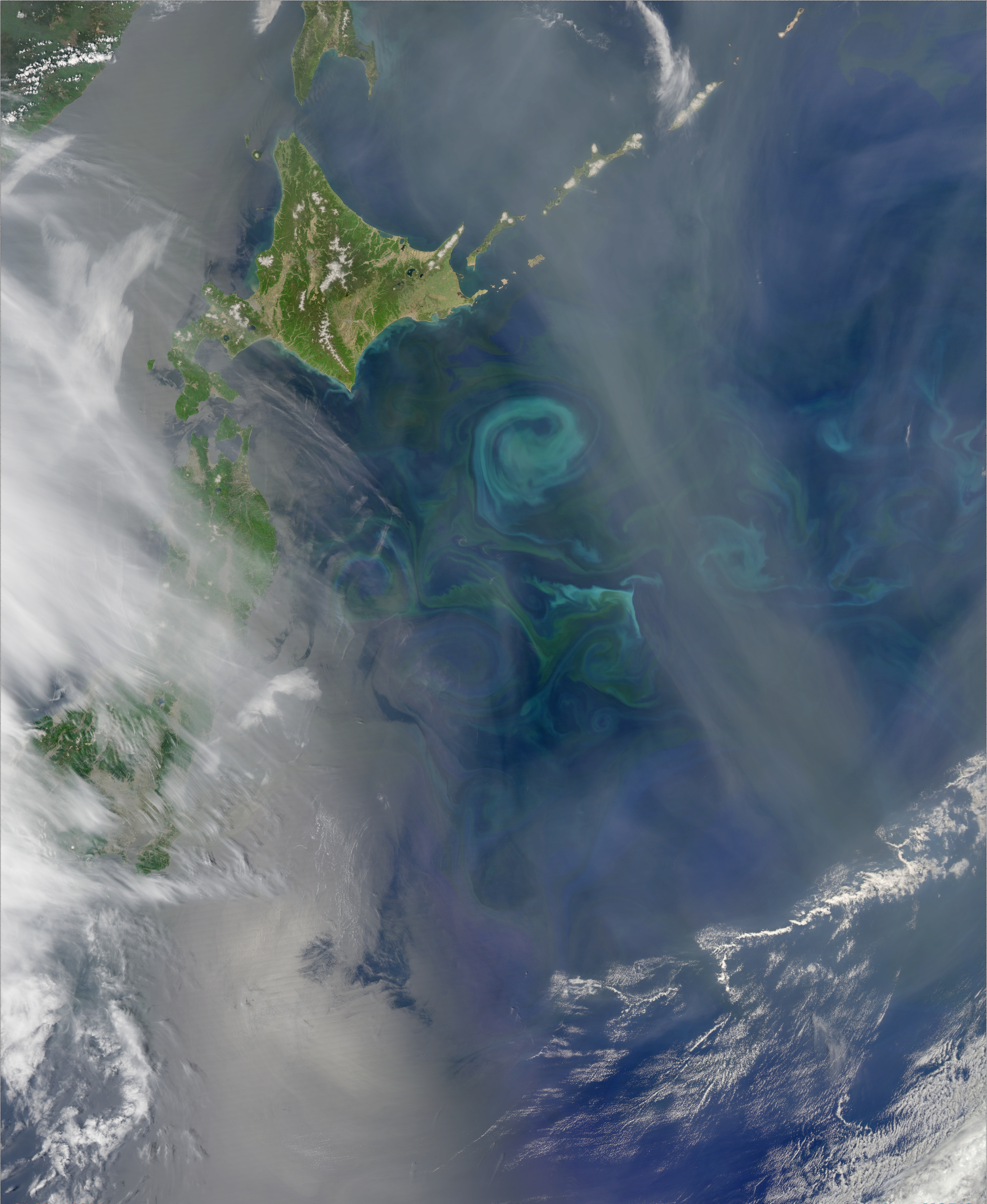
The Oyashio Current colliding with the Kuroshio Current near Hokkaido. When two currents collide, they create eddies. Phytoplankton growing in the surface waters become concentrated along the boundaries of these eddies, tracing out the motions of the water.

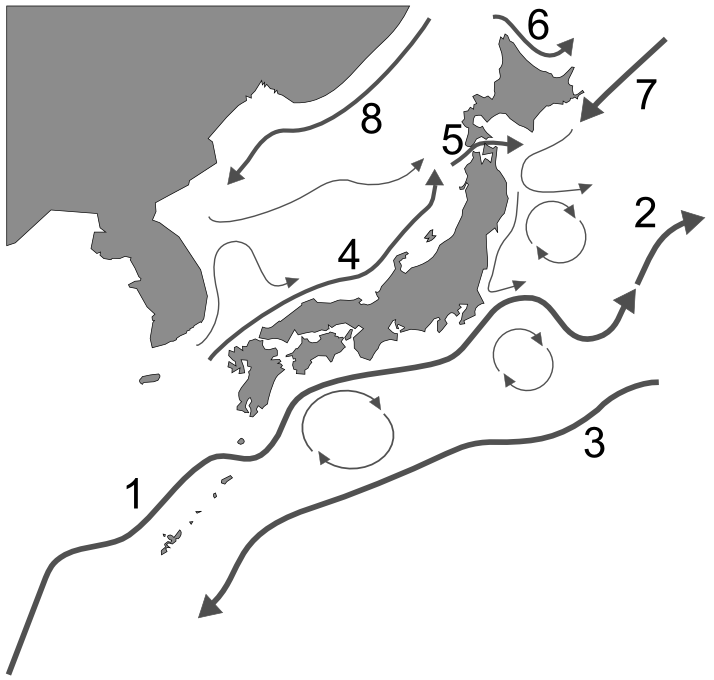
The ocean currents surrounding the Japanese Archipelago: 1.Kuroshio 2. Kuroshio extension 3. Kuroshio countercurrent 4. The Tsushima Current 5. The Tsugaru Current 6. The Sōya Current 7. Oyashio 8. The Liman Current

The Oyashio Current (親潮, "Parental Tide"), also known as the Okhotsk Current or Kurile Current, is a cold subarctic ocean current that flows south and circulates counterclockwise in the western North Pacific Ocean. The waters of the Oyashio Current originate in the Arctic Ocean and flow southward via the Bering Sea, passing through the Bering Strait and transporting cold water from the Arctic Sea into the Pacific Ocean and the Sea of Okhotsk. It collides with the Kuroshio Current off the eastern shore of Japan to form the North Pacific Current (or Drift). The nutrient-rich Oyashio is named for its metaphorical role as the parent (親, oya) that provides for and nurtures marine organisms.

== Climate impact ==
The current has an important impact on the climate of the Russian Far East, mainly in Kamchatka and Chukotka, where the northern limit of tree growth is moved south up to ten degrees compared with the latitude it can reach in inland Siberia. The waters of the Oyashio Current form probably the richest fishery in the world owing to the extremely high nutrient content of the cold water and the very high tides (up to 10 metres (33 ft)) in some areas – which further enhances the availability of nutrients. However, the Oyashio Current also causes Vladivostok to be the most equatorward port to seasonally freeze and require icebreaking ships to remain open in winter. Nonetheless, this has relatively little effect on the fish yield through the Sea of Okhotsk, because the large tides mean freezing does not occur so easily.

== History ==
During glacial periods, when lower sea level exposed the Bering land bridge, the current could not flow in the regions the Oyashio affects today. The level of cooling with the onset of glacial conditions (after an interglacial) was much less than in other areas of the Earth at similar latitudes. This allowed Tōhoku and Hokkaidō – the only areas of East Asia with enough snowfall to potentially form glaciers – to remain unglaciated except at high elevations during periods when Europe and North America were largely glaciated. This lack of glaciation explains why, despite its present climate being much colder than most of Europe, East Asia has retained 96 percent of Pliocene tree genera, whereas Europe has retained only 27%.

== See also ==
- Oceanic gyres
- Physical oceanography
