= Indonesian Throughflow =

Ocean current

Coordinates: 05°36′20″S 115°16′55″E

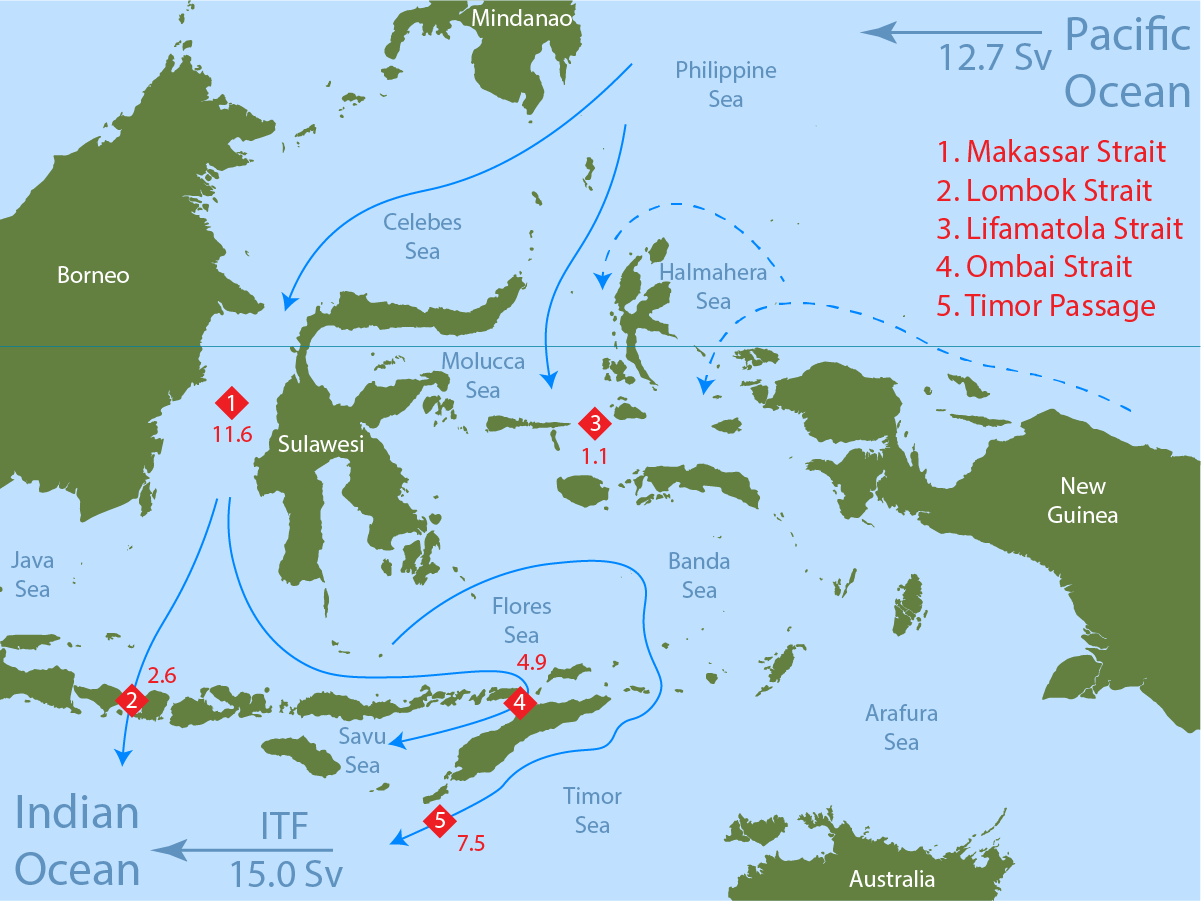
Schematic of the ITF. Values of the average flow and the major passages are indicated by red. Water enters the ITF from the western Pacific and exits into the Indian Ocean.

The Indonesian Throughflow (ITF; Indonesian: Arus Lintas Indonesia) is an ocean current with importance for global climate as is the low-latitude movement of warm, relative freshwater from the north Pacific to the Indian Ocean. It thus serves as a main upper branch of the global heat/salt conveyor belt.

== Cause and effects ==
The ocean surface of this part of the far western Pacific is on average each day higher than that in the adjacent part of the Indian Ocean. The difference drives upper thermocline water "downhill" through the deep, straight, westerly, north–south Makassar Strait then to meet the in reality combined Java Sea-Banda Sea. About 15% of this then exits directly through the very narrow Lombok Strait. Weaker flows of saltier and denser South Pacific slightly augment the Banda Sea via the Lifamatola Passage, both inflows mixing there due to its bounds and tides, Ekman pumping, and heat and freshwater flux. From this sea 85% of the ITF uses the broad Timor and narrow Ombai passage.

The location and topography of the channels that make up the ITF are shown inset. Lombok Strait is 300m deep and roughly 35 km wide and the currents vary between 0.67 m/s (1.6 mi/hr) westward to 0.286 m/s (0.6 mi/hr) eastward and average 0.25 m/s westward. Currents in Ombai vary between 0.12 m/s eastward to 0.16 m/s westward, averaging 0.11 m/s westward and are funneled within the 1250m deep and 35 km wide passage. Timor passage, which is 1890 m deep by 160 km wide, is the widest of the exit pathways and averages only 0.02 m/s. From 2004 to 2006, 11 moorings were deployed across the entrance and exit regions of the ITF and were positioned to accurately measure each passage's contribution as part of the International Nusantara Stratification and Transport (INSTANT) program. A study using Princeton Ocean Model has observed that the ITF has maximum volume transport from the Pacific Ocean to Indian Ocean through Savu strait (~6/5 Sv, 1 Sv = 10^{6} m^{3}/s), followed by Timor passage (~3.5/2 Sv) and Lombok strait (~2/1.75 Sv) thus the gross volume transport of ITF is ~10/9 Sv and also it is observed that the ITF increases the temperature of the Southern Indian Ocean while it has no significant effect on the sea surface salinity of Indian Ocean. Flow in through Makassar (11.6 Sv) and Lifamatola (1.1 Sv) sums to 12.7 Sv. Total outflow transport corresponds to 15.0 Sv (varying from 10.7 to 18.7 Sv) and is made up of Lombok (2.6 Sv), Ombai (4.9 Sv) and Timor (7.5 Sv) contributions. Heat Transport of the Indonesian Throughflow is 1.087 PW (1 PW=10^{15} Watt). Turbulence Kinetic Energy (TKE) of the ITF is of the order of 10^{−3} m^{2}s^{−2} in the upper layer whereas it is 10^{−4} m^{2}s^{−2} in the middle layer. Corresponding values of ITF TKE dissipation rate are of the order of 10^{−6} m^{2}s^{−3} and 10^{−8} m^{2}s^{−3} which indicate that this ITF archipelagoes region is a highly turbulent and a high heat dissipative in nature.

Circulation and transport within the Indonesian Seas vary along with large-scale monsoon flow. During June to August, southeasterlies of the southwest monsoon predominate over Indonesia and drive strong Ekman divergence (southwestward flow in the Southern Hemisphere thus increasing ITF to 15 Sv) whereas from December to February, Northwest Monsoon westerlies serve to directly reduce the ITF. During monsoon transitions, strong westerly winds in the eastern Indian Ocean force equatorial downwelling Kelvin waves (eastward moving, eastward flow) that propagate through the Indonesian passages as coastally trapped Kelvin waves and serve to reduce the ITF flow with a minimum in April of 9 Sv. Another way to think about it is that downwelling on the Indian Ocean side increases sea level and so reduces the normal Pacific-to-Indian pressure head reducing the flow.

Global-scale, ocean waves such as equatorial/coastal Kelvin and Rossby waves drive interannual variation of the ITF with an amplitude of roughly +/-3 Sv. Western-central Pacific westerly winds from El Nino force westward moving-equatorial Rossby waves and eastward currents that hit eastern New Guinea and propagate around the west coast as coastal Kelvin waves and down through the ITF along the west Australia Shelf coast serving to reduce the ITF. Upwelling (i.e. reduced sea level) associated with Rossby waves on the Pacific side reduces the Pacific-to-Indian pressure gradient and reduces the ITF. Interannual variability of Indian Ocean westerlies acts in the same manner as the seasonal equatorial Kelvin waves to reduce the normal westward ITF flow as well.

An important feature of the Indonesian Throughflow is that because the water in the western equatorial Pacific Ocean has a higher temperature and lower salinity than the water in the Indian Ocean, the Throughflow transports large amounts of relatively warm and fresh water to the Indian Ocean. When the Indonesian Throughflow (through Lombok Strait, Ombai and the Timor Passages) enters the Indian Ocean it is advected towards Africa within the Indian South Equatorial Current. There it eventually exits the Indian Ocean with the Agulhas Current around South Africa into the Atlantic Ocean. So the Indonesian Throughflow transports a significant amount of Pacific Ocean heat into the southwest Indian Ocean, which is approximately 10,000 km (6,200 mi) away from the Lombok Strait.

== See also ==
- Ocean gyre
- Throughflow
