= North Pacific Current =

Ocean current, Japan to British Columbia

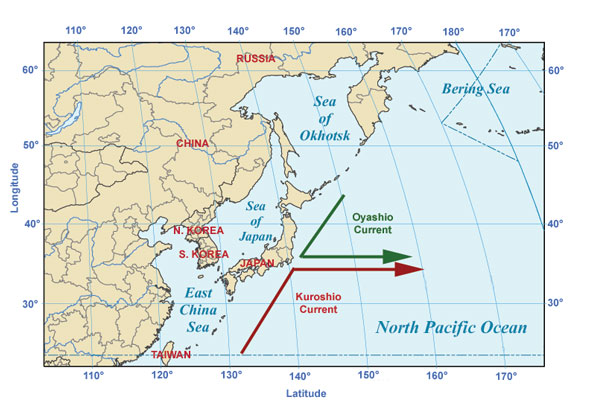
The North Pacific Current.

The North Pacific Current (sometimes referred to as the North Pacific Drift) is an ocean current that flows west-to-east between 30 and 50 degrees north in the Pacific Ocean. The current forms the southern part of the North Pacific Subpolar Gyre and the northern part of the North Pacific Subtropical Gyre. The North Pacific Current is formed by the collision of the Kuroshio Current, running northward off the coast of Japan, and the Oyashio Current, which is a cold subarctic current that flows south and circulates counterclockwise along the western North Pacific Ocean. In the eastern North Pacific off southern British Columbia, it splits into the southward flowing cold water California Current and the northward flowing Alaska Current.

== Flows and temperature ==
Originating from the eastward directed flow occurring east of the island of Honshu, Japan, the North Pacific Current extends over 40° of longitude. According to the Great Soviet Encyclopedia, the NPC may be considered to be a part or an extension of the Kuroshio current. The current covers a large area and brings warmer water from the subtropics to the sub-polar latitudes. Average sea surface temperature along the NPC can range in the winter from 45 to 61 °F (7 to 16 °C) and in the summer months 64–74 °F (18–23 °C).

As it flows from west to east, the latitudinal extent of the NPC increases so much that it spans some 20 degrees of latitude east of the dateline. This is associated with a decrease in the speed of current; eastward directed speeds at the surface are typically less than 0.05 m/s (5 cm/s) in the central Pacific. As the NPC approaches the west coast of North America, it divides into two broad currents: the northward flowing Alaska Current and the southward flowing California Current. The splitting of flow is referred to as the bifurcation of the NPC.

The Gulf of Alaska and the California Current receive different volumes and flows of warm water from the North Pacific Current. The Gulf of Alaska receives about 60% of the flow of the NPC while the California Current receives the remaining 40%. These values may fluctuate, resulting in changes in the volume and the speed of the NPC water entering into the Alaska and California Currents.

== Gyre contribution ==
The NPC forms the northward portion of the North Pacific Subtropical Gyre. As the eastward flow of the Kuroshio, the flow of the NPC can lead to the transport of material from the western Pacific to the coast of North America. For example, some of the marine debris from the Japanese earthquake and tsunami of 2011 was transported by the NPC across the Pacific, leading to deposition of tsunami debris along the shores of Alaska, British Columbia, Washington and Oregon.
