= Sverdrup =

Unit of measurement

sverdrup
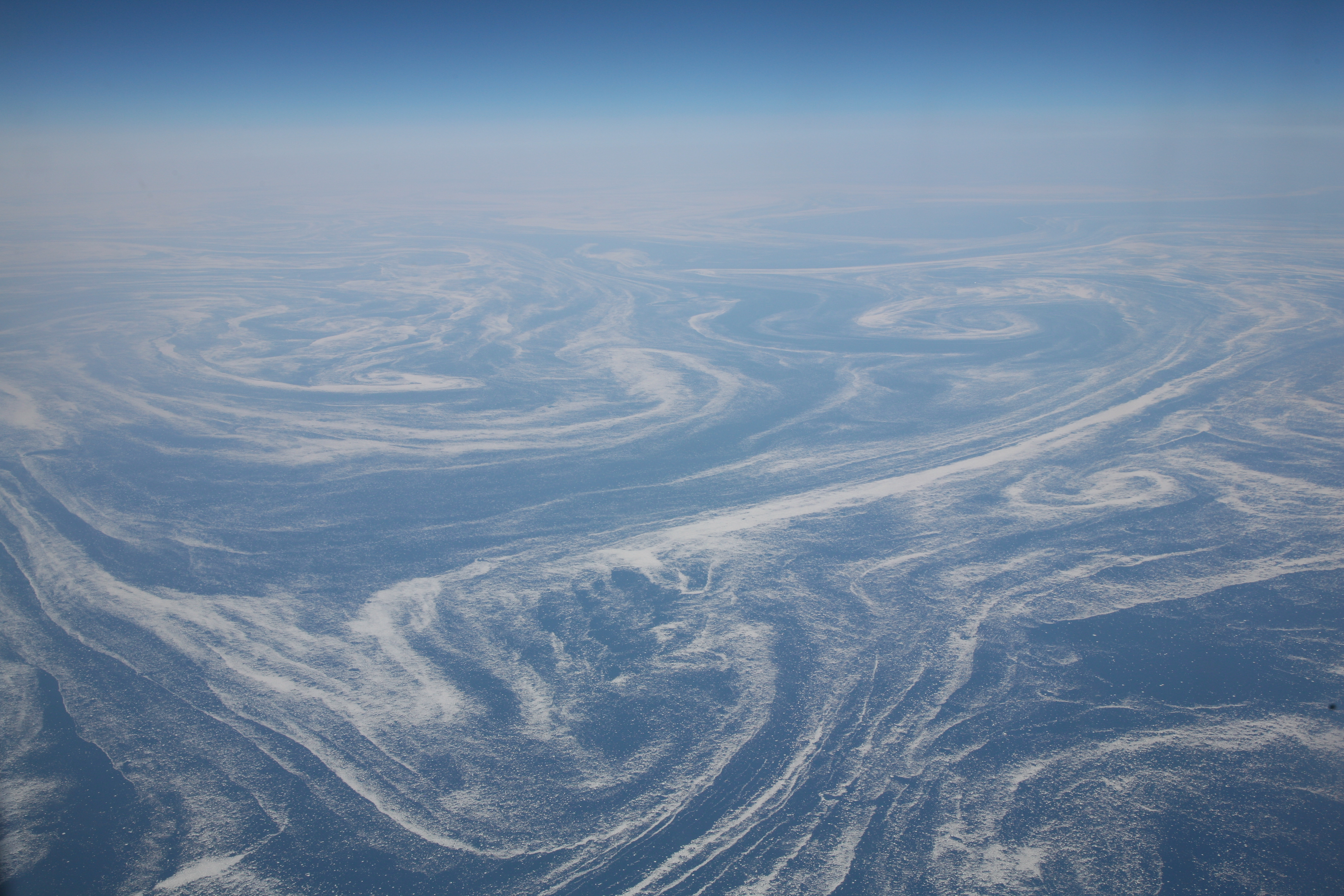

General information
- Unit of: volumetric flow rate
- Symbol: Sv

Conversions
1 Sv in ...	... is equal to ...
- m^{3}/s: 1 million
- US gallons/s: 264 million
- cu ft/s: 35 million

In oceanography, the sverdrup (symbol: Sv (Note: Sv is also used by the SI unit sievert and the non-SI unit svedberg.)) is a non-SI metric unit of volumetric flow rate, with 1 Sv equal to 1 million cubic meters per second (35314667 cu ft/s), or equivalently 1 cubic hectometer per second (symbol: hm^{3}/s or hm^{3}⋅s^{−1}). It is used almost exclusively in oceanography to measure the volumetric rate of transport of ocean currents. It is named after Harald Sverdrup.

One sverdrup is about five times what is carried at the estuary by the world's largest river, the Amazon. In the context of ocean currents, a volume of one million cubic meters may be imagined as a "slice" of ocean with dimensions 1 km × 1 km × 1 m (width × length × thickness) or a cube with dimensions 100 m × 100 m × 100 m. At this scale, these units can be more easily compared in terms of width of the current (several km), depth (hundreds of meters), and current speed (as meters per second). Thus, a hypothetical current 50 km wide, 500 m (0.5 km) deep, and moving at 2 m/s would be transporting 50 Sv of water.

The sverdrup is distinct from the sievert, SI unit of radiation, or the svedberg, non-SI unit of sedimentation rate. All three use the same symbol, but they are not related.

== History ==
The sverdrup is named in honor of the Norwegian oceanographer, meteorologist and polar explorer Harald Ulrik Sverdrup (1888–1957), who wrote the 1942 volume The Oceans, Their Physics, Chemistry, and General Biology together with Martin W. Johnson and Richard H. Fleming.

In the 1950s and early 1960s both Soviet and North American scientists contemplated the damming of the Bering Strait, thus enabling temperate Atlantic water to heat up the cold Arctic Sea and, the theory went, making Siberia and northern Canada more habitable. As part of the North American team, Canadian oceanographer Maxwell Dunbar found it "very cumbersome" to repeatedly reference millions of cubic meters per second. He casually suggested that as a new unit of water flow, "the inflow through Bering Strait is one sverdrup". At the Arctic Basin Symposium in October 1962, the unit came into general usage.

== Examples ==
The water transport in the Gulf Stream gradually increases from 30 Sv in the Florida Current to a maximum of 150 Sv south of Newfoundland at the longitude 55° W.

The Antarctic Circumpolar Current, at approximately 125 Sv, is the largest ocean current.

The entire global input of fresh water from rivers to the ocean is approximately 1.2 Sv.
