= Physical oceanography =

Study of physical conditions and processes within the ocean

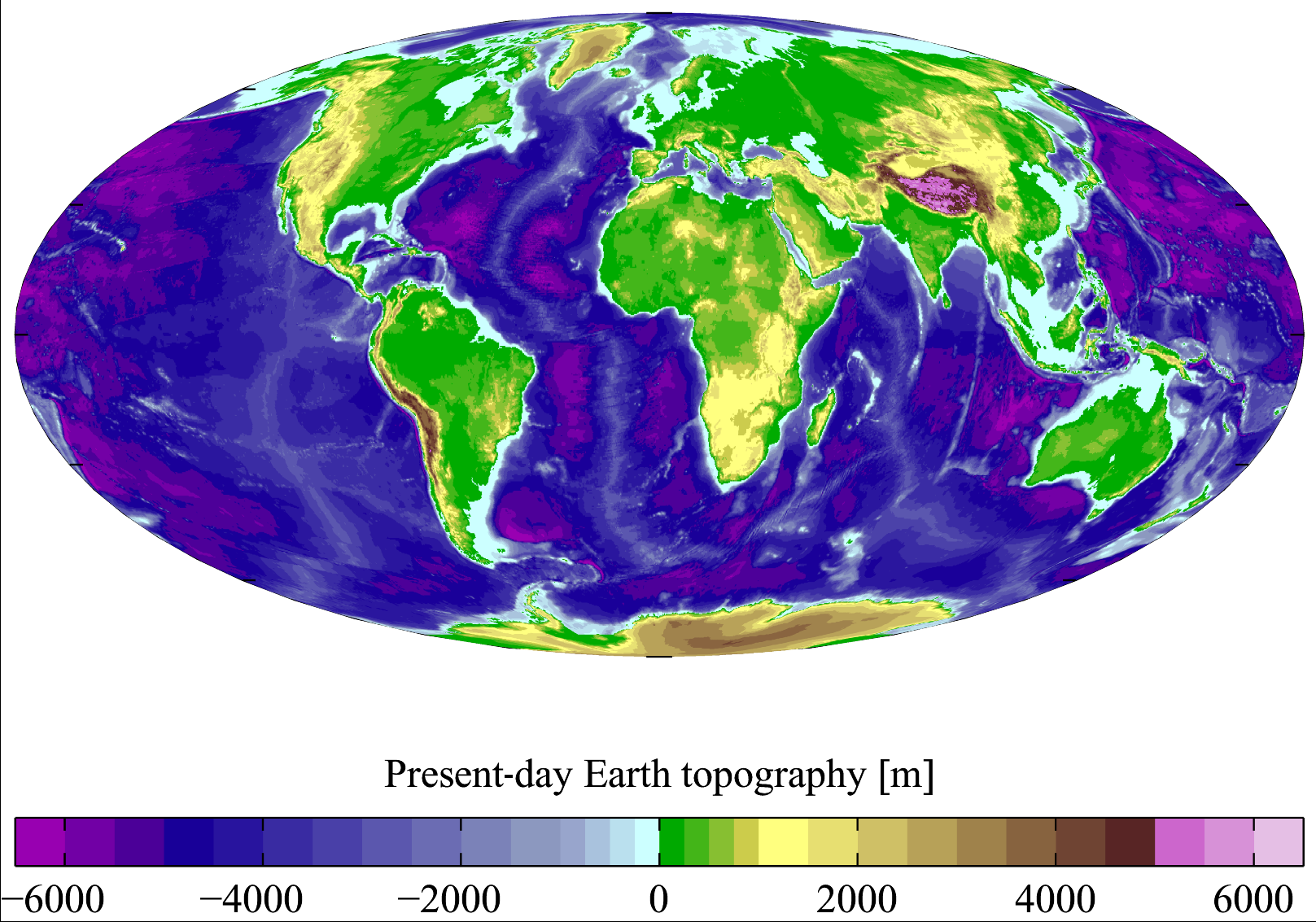
World ocean bathymetry.

Physical oceanography is the study of physical conditions and physical processes within the ocean, especially the motions and physical properties of ocean waters.

Physical oceanography is one of several sub-domains into which oceanography is divided. Others include biological, chemical and geological oceanography. Like the study of atmospheric physics, physical oceanography is founded upon principles of thermodynamics and fluid mechanics.

Physical oceanography may be subdivided into descriptive and dynamical physical oceanography.

Descriptive physical oceanography seeks to research the ocean through observations and complex numerical models that describe temperature, salinity, density, currents and other ocean features as accurately and completely as possible.

Dynamical physical oceanography focuses primarily upon the processes that govern the motion of fluids with emphasis upon theoretical research and numerical models. These are part of the large field of Geophysical Fluid Dynamics (GFD) that is shared together with meteorology. GFD is a sub field of fluid dynamics describing flows occurring on spatial and temporal scales that are greatly influenced by the Coriolis force.

== Physical setting ==
External image
- Space and time scales of physical oceanographic processes.

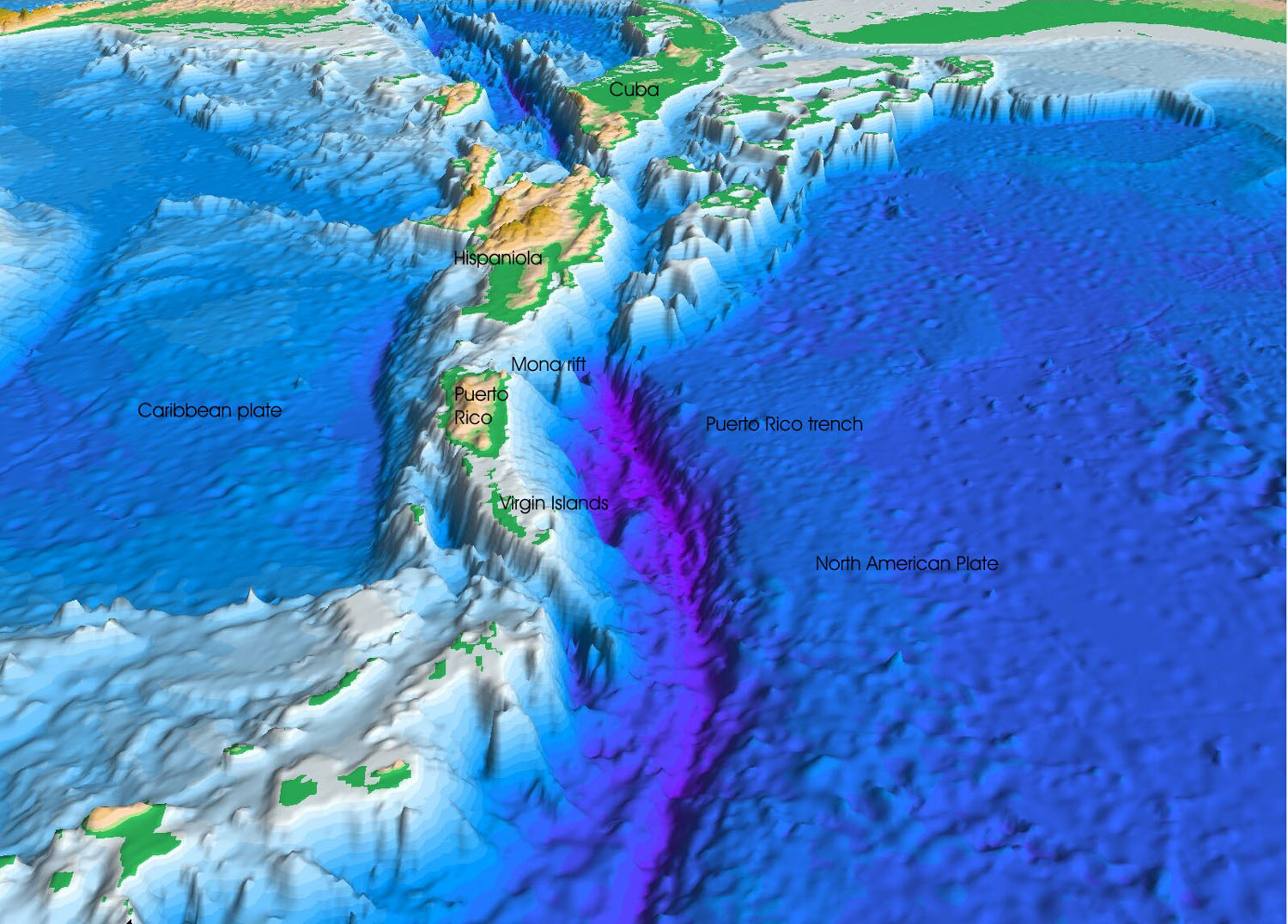
Perspective view of the sea floor of the Atlantic Ocean and the Caribbean Sea. The purple sea floor at the center of the view is the Puerto Rico Trench.

Nearly 100% of the planet's water is in its oceans, and the oceans are the source of the vast majority of water vapor that condenses in the atmosphere and falls as rain or snow on the continents. The tremendous heat capacity of the oceans moderates the planet's climate, and its absorption of various gases affects the composition of the atmosphere. The ocean's influence extends even to the composition of volcanic rocks through seafloor metamorphism, as well as to that of volcanic gases and magmas created at subduction zones.

From sea level, the oceans are far deeper than the continents are tall; examination of the Earth's hypsographic curve shows that the average elevation of Earth's landmasses is only 840 metres (2,760 ft), while the ocean's average depth is 3,800 metres (12,500 ft). Though this apparent discrepancy is great, for both land and sea, the respective extremes such as mountains and trenches are rare.

Area, volume plus mean and maximum depths of oceans (excluding adjacent seas)
Body	Area (10^{6}km^{2})	Volume (10^{6}km^{3})	Mean depth (m)	Maximum (m)
Pacific Ocean	165.2	707.6	4282	-11033
Atlantic Ocean	82.4	323.6	3926	-8605
Indian Ocean	73.4	291.0	3963	-8047
Southern Ocean	20.3			-7235
Arctic Ocean	14.1		1038
Caribbean Sea	2.8			-7686

== Temperature, salinity and density ==
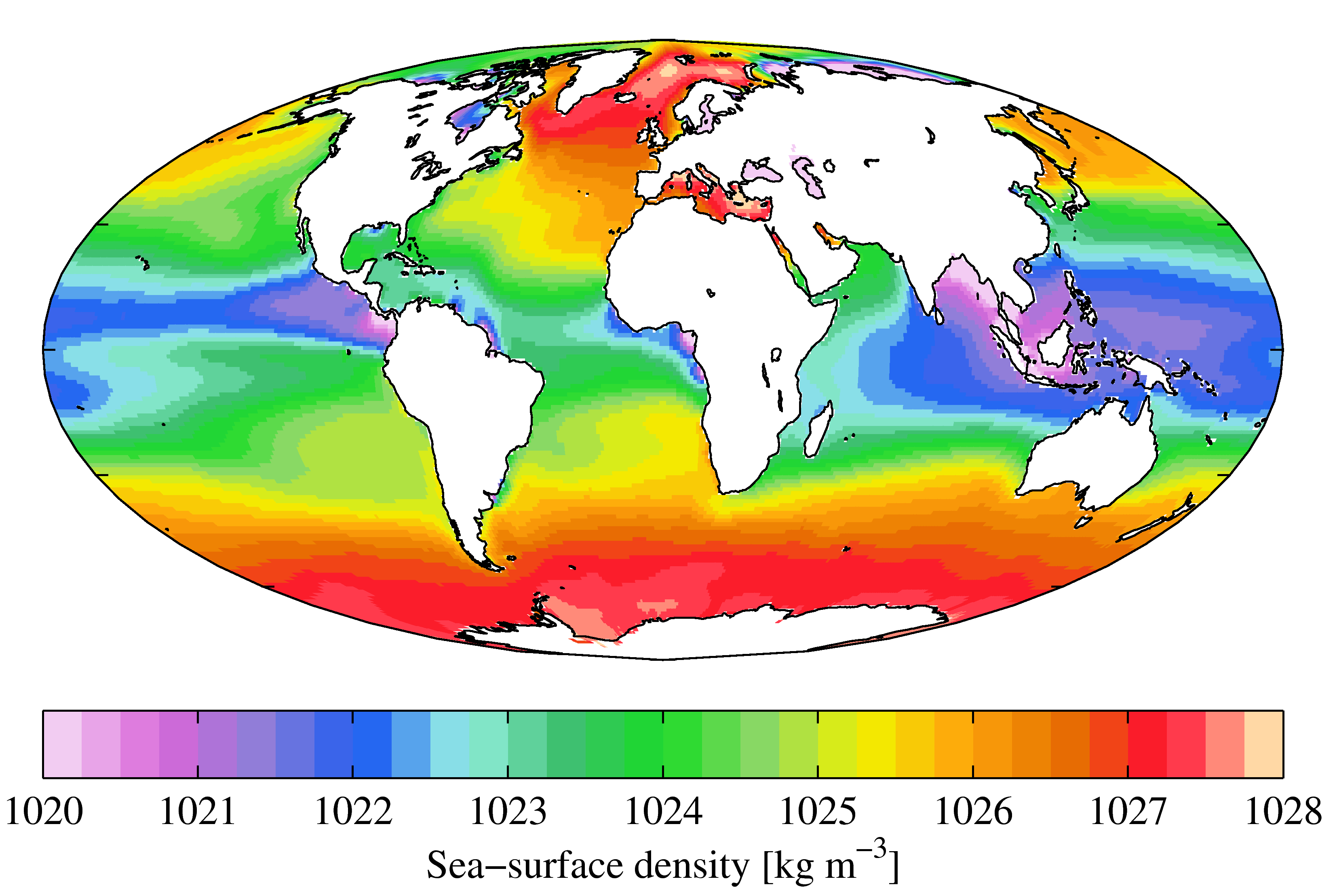
WOA surface density.

Because the vast majority of the world ocean's volume is deep water, the mean temperature of seawater is low; roughly 75% of the ocean's volume has a temperature from 0° – 5 °C (Pinet 1996). The same percentage falls in a salinity range between 34 and 35 ppt (3.4–3.5%) (Pinet 1996). There is still quite a bit of variation, however. Surface temperatures can range from below freezing near the poles to 35 °C in restricted tropical seas, while salinity can vary from 10 to 41 ppt (1.0–4.1%).

The vertical structure of the temperature can be divided into three basic layers, a surface mixed layer, where gradients are low, a thermocline where gradients are high, and a poorly stratified abyss.

In terms of temperature, the ocean's layers are highly latitude-dependent; the thermocline is pronounced in the tropics, but nonexistent in polar waters (Marshak 2001). The halocline usually lies near the surface, where evaporation raises salinity in the tropics, or meltwater dilutes it in polar regions. These variations of salinity and temperature with depth change the density of the seawater, creating the pycnocline.

=== Temperature ===
The temperature of ocean water varies significantly across different regions and depths. As mentioned, the vast majority of ocean water (around 75%) lies between 0 °C (32 °F) and 5 °C (41 °F), mostly in the deep ocean, where sunlight does not penetrate. The surface layers, however, experience far greater variability. In polar regions, surface temperatures can drop below freezing, while in tropical and subtropical regions, they may reach up to 35 °C (95 °F). This thermal stratification results in a vertical temperature gradient that divides the ocean into distinct layers.

1. Surface Mixed Layer: This uppermost layer is well-mixed due to wind and wave action, resulting in minimal temperature variation with depth. The thickness of this layer varies depending on location and season but can extend from 50 to 200 metres (160 to 660 ft).
2. Thermocline: Below the mixed layer lies the thermocline, a zone where temperature decreases rapidly with increasing depth. The thermocline is especially pronounced in tropical and temperate regions but is absent in polar waters where surface temperatures are already near freezing. The depth and sharpness of the thermocline can shift with seasonal changes and ocean currents, playing a critical role in regulating heat exchange between the ocean and the atmosphere.
3. Abyssal Zone: Beneath the thermocline is the deep ocean or abyssal zone, where temperatures remain relatively uniform, hovering just above freezing, 0–3 °C (32–37 °F). This cold, dense water originates from polar regions, where surface water cools, sinks, and spreads towards the equator along the ocean floor, forming the deep ocean circulation system.

=== Salinity ===
Salinity, a measure of the concentration of dissolved salts in seawater, typically ranges between 34 and 35 parts per thousand (ppt) in most of the world’s oceans. However, localized factors such as evaporation, precipitation, river runoff, and ice formation or melting cause significant variations in salinity. These variations are often most evident in coastal areas and marginal seas.

1. Surface Salinity: In the open ocean, salinity is generally highest in subtropical regions where high evaporation rates dominate, and lowest in regions of high precipitation or freshwater influx from rivers, such as the mouths of the Amazon and Congo Rivers. Tropical and subtropical seas, such as the Red Sea and the Mediterranean, can experience salinities as high as 40-41 ppt due to intense evaporation and restricted water exchange with the open ocean.
2. Halocline: The halocline is a layer within the ocean where salinity changes rapidly with depth. This stratification can be influenced by surface processes like evaporation (which increases salinity) and freshwater input (which decreases it). The halocline often coincides with the thermocline, particularly in tropical and subtropical regions, contributing to overall water column stability.
3. Polar Regions: In polar areas, surface salinity is generally lower due to freshwater input from melting ice. During sea ice formation, however, brine rejection increases the salinity of surrounding waters, contributing to the sinking of dense water masses and the formation of deep ocean currents that drive global circulation patterns.

The salt in the oceans originates from runoff from terrestrial sources as well as hydrothermal vents. It has been estimated that the salinity of oceans was greater in the distant past than it is today.

=== Density and the Pycnocline ===
The combination of temperature and salinity variations leads to changes in seawater density. Seawater density is primarily influenced by both these factors—colder, saltier water is denser than warmer, fresher water. This variation in density creates stratification in the ocean and is key to understanding ocean circulation patterns.

1. Pycnocline: The pycnocline is a layer within the ocean where the density increases rapidly with depth. It typically coincides with the thermocline and halocline in tropical and subtropical waters, forming a sharp boundary between the less dense surface waters and the denser deep ocean waters. This density stratification acts as a barrier to vertical mixing, limiting the exchange of heat, gases, and nutrients between the surface and deep ocean layers.
2. Thermohaline Circulation: Density differences drive the thermohaline circulation, also known as the global "conveyor belt," which plays a crucial role in regulating Earth's climate. Cold, dense water formed in the polar regions sinks and moves along the ocean floor toward the equator, while warmer surface waters flow poleward to replace it. This global circulation helps redistribute heat and maintains the ocean's dynamic equilibrium.
3. Regional Variations: In areas of upwelling or downwelling, the density structure of the water column can be disrupted. Upwelling brings cooler, nutrient-rich water to the surface, while downwelling pushes surface waters to greater depths, impacting local ecosystems and global climate.

Understanding the complex interactions between temperature, salinity, and density is essential for predicting ocean circulation patterns, climate change effects, and the health of marine ecosystems. These factors also influence marine life, as many species are sensitive to the specific temperature and salinity ranges of their habitats.

== Circulation ==
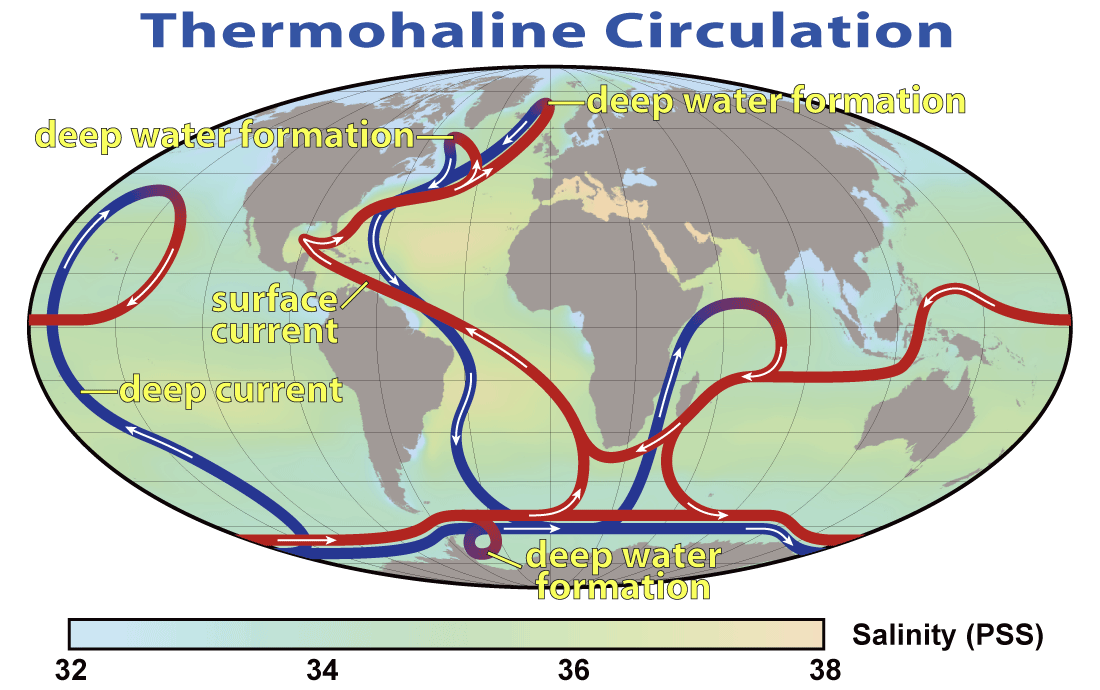
Density-driven thermohaline circulation.

Energy for the ocean circulation (and for the atmospheric circulation) comes from solar radiation and gravitational energy from the Sun and Moon. The amount of sunlight absorbed at the surface varies strongly with latitude, being greater at the equator than at the poles, and this engenders fluid motion in both the atmosphere and ocean that acts to redistribute heat from the equator towards the poles, thereby reducing the temperature gradients that would exist in the absence of fluid motion. Perhaps three quarters of this heat is carried in the atmosphere; the rest is carried in the ocean.

The atmosphere is heated from below, which leads to convection, the largest expression of which is the Hadley circulation. By contrast the ocean is heated from above, which tends to suppress convection. Instead ocean deep water is formed in polar regions where cold salty waters sink in fairly restricted areas. This is the beginning of the thermohaline circulation.

Oceanic currents are largely driven by the surface wind stress; hence the large-scale atmospheric circulation is important to understanding the ocean circulation. The Hadley circulation leads to Easterly winds in the tropics and Westerlies in mid-latitudes. This leads to slow equatorward flow throughout most of a subtropical ocean basin (the Sverdrup balance). The return flow occurs in an intense, narrow, poleward western boundary current. Like the atmosphere, the ocean is far wider than it is deep, and hence horizontal motion is in general much faster than vertical motion. In the southern hemisphere there is a continuous belt of ocean, and hence the mid-latitude westerlies force the strong Antarctic Circumpolar Current. In the northern hemisphere the land masses prevent this and the ocean circulation is broken into smaller gyres in the Atlantic and Pacific basins.

=== Coriolis effect ===
The Coriolis effect results in a deflection of fluid flows (to the right in the Northern Hemisphere and left in the Southern Hemisphere). This has profound effects on the flow of the oceans. In particular it means the flow goes around high and low pressure systems, permitting them to persist for long periods of time. As a result, tiny variations in pressure can produce measurable currents. A slope of one part in one million in sea surface height, for example, will result in a current of 10 cm/s at mid-latitudes. The fact that the Coriolis effect is largest at the poles and weak at the equator results in sharp, relatively steady western boundary currents which are absent on eastern boundaries. Also see secondary circulation effects.

=== Ekman transport ===
Ekman transport results in the net transport of surface water 90 degrees to the right of the wind in the Northern Hemisphere, and 90 degrees to the left of the wind in the Southern Hemisphere. As the wind blows across the surface of the ocean, it "grabs" onto a thin layer of the surface water. In turn, that thin sheet of water transfers motion energy to the thin layer of water under it, and so on. However, because of the Coriolis Effect, the direction of travel of the layers of water slowly move farther and farther to the right as they get deeper in the Northern Hemisphere, and to the left in the Southern Hemisphere. In most cases, the very bottom layer of water affected by the wind is at a depth of 100 m – 150 m and is traveling about 180 degrees, completely opposite of the direction that the wind is blowing. Overall, the net transport of water would be 90 degrees from the original direction of the wind.

=== Langmuir circulation ===
Langmuir circulation results in the occurrence of thin, visible stripes, called windrows on the surface of the ocean parallel to the direction that the wind is blowing. If the wind is blowing with more than 3 m s^{−1}, it can create parallel windrows alternating upwelling and downwelling about 5–300 m apart. These windrows are created by adjacent ovular water cells (extending to about 6 m (20 ft) deep) alternating rotating clockwise and counterclockwise. In the convergence zones debris, foam and seaweed accumulates, while at the divergence zones plankton are caught and carried to the surface. If there are many plankton in the divergence zone fish are often attracted to feed on them.

=== Ocean–atmosphere interface ===
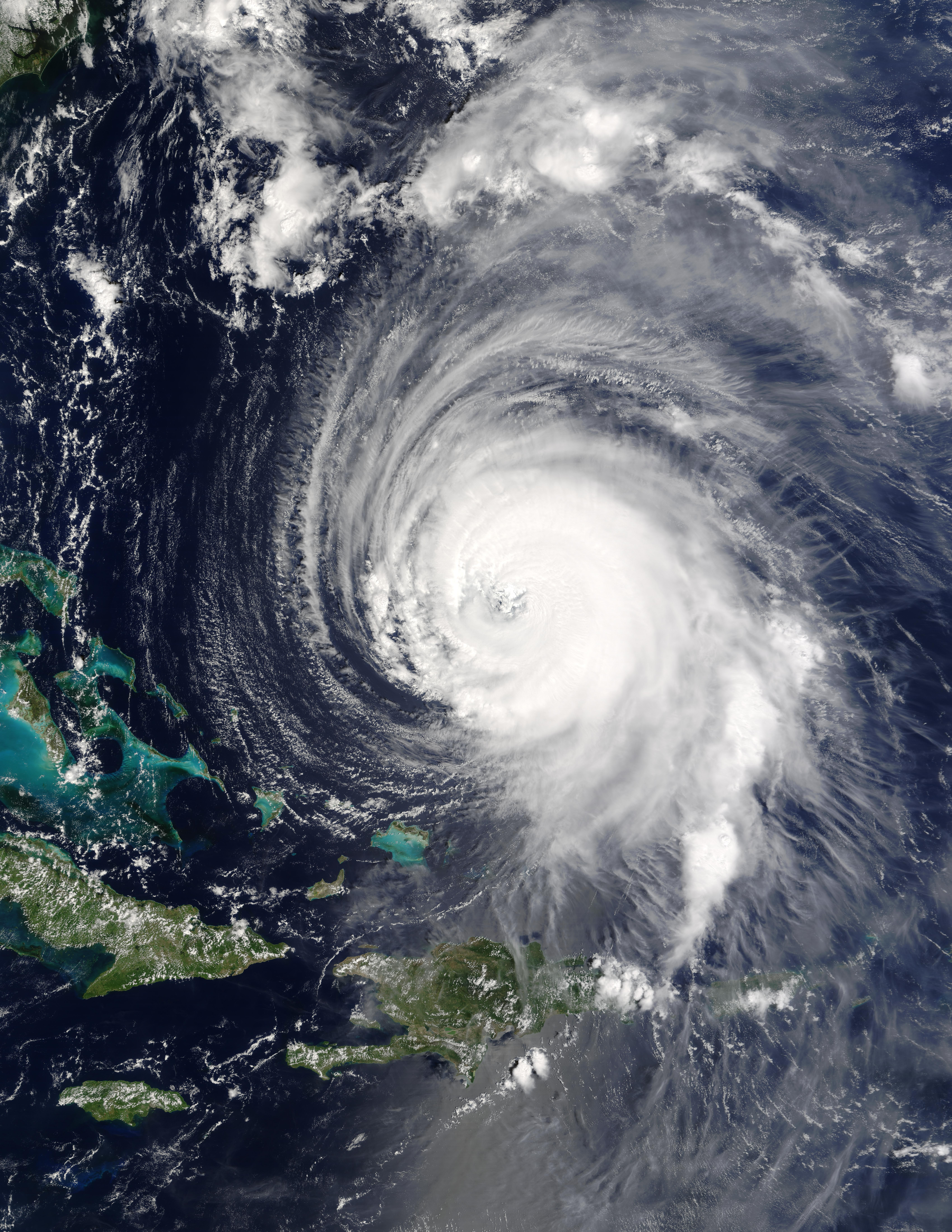
Hurricane Isabel east of the Bahamas on 15 September 2003

At the ocean-atmosphere interface, the ocean and atmosphere exchange fluxes of heat, moisture and momentum.

Heat

The important heat terms at the surface are the sensible heat flux, the latent heat flux, the incoming solar radiation and the balance of long-wave (infrared) radiation. In general, the tropical oceans will tend to show a net gain of heat, and the polar oceans a net loss, the result of a net transfer of energy polewards in the oceans.

The oceans' large heat capacity moderates the climate of areas adjacent to the oceans, leading to a maritime climate at such locations. This can be a result of heat storage in summer and release in winter; or of transport of heat from warmer locations: a particularly notable example of this is Western Europe, which is heated at least in part by the north Atlantic drift.

Momentum

Surface winds tend to be of order meters per second; ocean currents of order centimeters per second. Hence from the point of view of the atmosphere, the ocean can be considered effectively stationary; from the point of view of the ocean, the atmosphere imposes a significant wind stress on its surface, and this forces large-scale currents in the ocean.

Through the wind stress, the wind generates ocean surface waves; the longer waves have a phase velocity tending towards the wind speed. Momentum of the surface winds is transferred into the energy flux by the ocean surface waves. The increased roughness of the ocean surface, by the presence of the waves, changes the wind near the surface.

Moisture

The ocean can gain moisture from rainfall, or lose it through evaporation. Evaporative loss leaves the ocean saltier; the Mediterranean and Persian Gulf for example have strong evaporative loss; the resulting plume of dense salty water may be traced through the Straits of Gibraltar into the Atlantic Ocean. At one time, it was believed that evaporation/precipitation was a major driver of ocean currents; it is now known to be only a very minor factor.

=== Planetary waves ===
Kelvin Waves

A Kelvin wave is any progressive wave that is channeled between two boundaries or opposing forces (usually between the Coriolis force and a coastline or the equator). There are two types, coastal and equatorial. Kelvin waves are gravity driven and non-dispersive. This means that Kelvin waves can retain their shape and direction over long periods of time. They are usually created by a sudden shift in the wind, such as the change of the trade winds at the beginning of the El Niño-Southern Oscillation.

Coastal Kelvin waves follow shorelines and will always propagate in a counterclockwise direction in the Northern Hemisphere (with the shoreline to the right of the direction of travel) and clockwise in the Southern Hemisphere.

Equatorial Kelvin waves propagate to the east in both the Northern Hemisphere and Southern Hemisphere, using the equator as a guide.

Kelvin waves are known to have very high speeds, typically around 2–3 meters per second. They have wavelengths of thousands of kilometers and amplitudes in the tens of meters.

Rossby Waves

Rossby waves, or planetary waves are huge, slow waves generated in the troposphere by temperature differences between the ocean and the continents. Their major restoring force is the change in Coriolis force with latitude. Their wave amplitudes are usually in the tens of meters and very large wavelengths. They are usually found at low or mid latitudes.

There are two types of Rossby waves, barotropic and baroclinic. Barotropic Rossby waves have the highest speeds and do not vary vertically. Baroclinic Rossby waves are much slower.

The special identifying feature of Rossby waves is that the phase velocity of each individual wave always has a westward component, but the group velocity can be in any direction. Usually the shorter Rossby waves have an eastward group velocity and the longer ones have a westward group velocity.

=== Climate variability ===
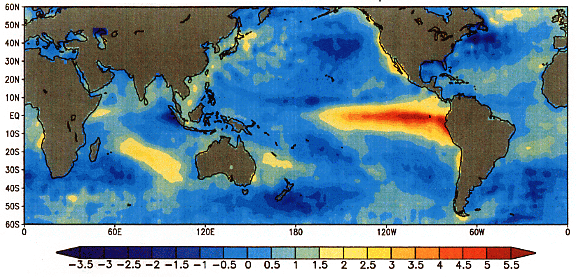
December 1997 chart of ocean surface temperature anomaly [°C] during the last strong El Niño

The interaction of ocean circulation, which serves as a type of heat pump, and biological effects such as the concentration of carbon dioxide can result in global climate changes on a time scale of decades. Known climate oscillations resulting from these interactions, include the Pacific decadal oscillation, North Atlantic oscillation, and Arctic oscillation. The oceanic process of thermohaline circulation is a significant component of heat redistribution across the globe, and changes in this circulation can have major impacts upon the climate.

==== Antarctic circumpolar wave ====
This is a coupled ocean/atmosphere wave that circles the Southern Ocean about every eight years. Since it is a wave-2 phenomenon (there are two peaks and two troughs in a latitude circle) at each fixed point in space a signal with a period of four years is seen. The wave moves eastward in the direction of the Antarctic Circumpolar Current.

=== Ocean currents ===
Among the most important ocean currents are the:

- Antarctic Circumpolar Current
- Deep ocean (density-driven)
- Western boundary currents
  - Gulf Stream
  - Kuroshio Current
  - Labrador Current
  - Oyashio Current
  - Agulhas Current
  - Brazil Current
  - East Australia Current
- Eastern Boundary currents
  - California Current
  - Canary Current
  - Peru Current
  - Benguela Current

==== Antarctic circumpolar ====
The ocean body surrounding the Antarctic is currently the only continuous body of water where there is a wide latitude band of open water. It interconnects the Atlantic, Pacific and Indian oceans, and provide an uninterrupted stretch for the prevailing westerly winds to significantly increase wave amplitudes. It is generally accepted that these prevailing winds are primarily responsible for the circumpolar current transport. This current is now thought to vary with time, possibly in an oscillatory manner.

==== Deep ocean ====
In the Norwegian Sea evaporative cooling is predominant, and the sinking water mass, the North Atlantic Deep Water (NADW), fills the basin and spills southwards through crevasses in the submarine sills that connect Greenland, Iceland and Britain. It then flows along the western boundary of the Atlantic with some part of the flow moving eastward along the equator and then poleward into the ocean basins. The NADW is entrained into the Circumpolar Current, and can be traced into the Indian and Pacific basins. Flow from the Arctic Ocean Basin into the Pacific, however, is blocked by the narrow shallows of the Bering Strait.

Also see marine geology about that explores the geology of the ocean floor including plate tectonics that create deep ocean trenches.

==== Western boundary ====
An idealised subtropical ocean basin forced by winds circling around a high pressure (anticyclonic) systems such as the Azores-Bermuda high develops a gyre circulation with slow steady flows towards the equator in the interior. As discussed by Henry Stommel, these flows are balanced in the region of the western boundary, where a thin fast polewards flow called a western boundary current develops. Flow in the real ocean is more complex, but the Gulf Stream, Agulhas and Kuroshio are examples of such currents. They are narrow (approximately 100 km across) and fast (approximately 1.5 m/s).

Equatorwards western boundary currents occur in tropical and polar locations, e.g. the East Greenland and Labrador currents, in the Atlantic and the Oyashio. They are forced by winds circulation around low pressure (cyclonic).

Gulf Stream

The Gulf Stream, together with its northern extension, North Atlantic Current, is a powerful, warm, and swift Atlantic Ocean current that originates in the Gulf of Mexico, exits through the Strait of Florida, and follows the eastern coastlines of the United States and Newfoundland to the northeast before crossing the Atlantic Ocean.

Kuroshio

The Kuroshio Current is an ocean current found in the western Pacific Ocean off the east coast of Taiwan and flowing northeastward past Japan, where it merges with the easterly drift of the North Pacific Current. It is analogous to the Gulf Stream in the Atlantic Ocean, transporting warm, tropical water northward towards the polar region.

== Heat flux ==
=== Heat storage ===
Ocean heat flux is a turbulent and complex system which utilizes atmospheric measurement techniques such as eddy covariance to measure the rate of heat transfer expressed in the unit of or petawatts. Heat flux is the flow of energy per unit of area per unit of time. Most of the Earth's heat storage is within its seas with smaller fractions of the heat transfer in processes such as evaporation, radiation, diffusion, or absorption into the sea floor. The majority of the ocean heat flux is through advection or the movement of the ocean's currents. For example, the majority of the warm water movement in the south Atlantic is thought to have originated in the Indian Ocean. Another example of advection is the nonequatorial Pacific heating which results from subsurface processes related to atmospheric anticlines. Recent warming observations of Antarctic bottom water in the Southern Ocean is of concern to ocean scientists because bottom water changes will effect currents, nutrients, and biota elsewhere. The international awareness of global warming has focused scientific research on this topic since the 1988 creation of the Intergovernmental Panel on Climate Change. Improved ocean observation, instrumentation, theory, and funding has increased scientific reporting on regional and global issues related to heat.

=== Sea level change ===
Tide gauges and satellite altimetry suggest an increase in sea level of 1.5–3 mm/yr over the past 100 years.

The IPCC predicts that by 2081–2100, global warming will lead to a sea level rise of 260 to 820 mm.

== Rapid variations ==
=== Tides ===
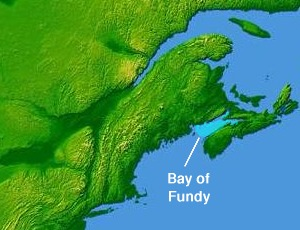
The Bay of Fundy is a bay located on the Atlantic coast of North America, on the northeast end of the Gulf of Maine between the provinces of New Brunswick and Nova Scotia.

The rise and fall of the oceans due to tidal effects is a key influence upon the coastal areas. Ocean tides on the planet Earth are created by the gravitational effects of the Sun and Moon. The tides produced by these two bodies are roughly comparable in magnitude, but the orbital motion of the Moon results in tidal patterns that vary over the course of a month.

The ebb and flow of the tides produce a cyclical current along the coast, and the strength of this current can be quite dramatic along narrow estuaries. Incoming tides can also produce a tidal bore along a river or narrow bay as the water flow against the current results in a wave on the surface.

Tide and Current (Wyban 1992) clearly illustrates the impact of these natural cycles on the lifestyle and livelihood of Native Hawaiians tending coastal fishponds. Aia ke ola ka hana meaning . . . Life is in labor.

Tidal resonance occurs in the Bay of Fundy since the time it takes for a large wave to travel from the mouth of the bay to the opposite end, then reflect and travel back to the mouth of the bay coincides with the tidal rhythm producing the world's highest tides.

As the surface tide oscillates over topography, such as submerged seamounts or ridges, it generates internal waves at the tidal frequency, which are known as internal tides.

=== Tsunamis ===
A series of surface waves can be generated due to large-scale displacement of the ocean water. These can be caused by sub-marine landslides, seafloor deformations due to earthquakes, or the impact of a large meteorite.

The waves can travel with a velocity of up to several hundred km/hour across the ocean surface, but in mid-ocean they are barely detectable with wavelengths spanning hundreds of kilometers.

Tsunamis, originally called tidal waves, were renamed because they are not related to the tides. They are regarded as shallow-water waves, or waves in water with a depth less than 1/20 their wavelength. Tsunamis have very large periods, high speeds, and great wave heights.

The primary impact of these waves is along the coastal shoreline, as large amounts of ocean water are cyclically propelled inland and then drawn out to sea. This can result in significant modifications to the coastline regions where the waves strike with sufficient energy.

The tsunami that occurred in Lituya Bay, Alaska on July 9, 1958 was 520 m (1,710 ft) high and is the biggest tsunami ever measured, almost 90 m (300 ft) taller than the Sears Tower in Chicago and about 110 m (360 ft) taller than the former World Trade Center in New York.

=== Surface waves ===
The wind generates ocean surface waves, which have a large impact on offshore structures, ships, Coastal erosion and sedimentation, as well as harbours. After their generation by the wind, ocean surface waves can travel (as swell) over long distances.

== See also ==
- Climate change (general concept)
- CORA dataset temperature and salinity oceanographic dataset
- Downwelling
- Geophysical fluid dynamics
- Global Sea Level Observing System
- Global warming
- Hydrothermal circulation
- List of ocean circulation models
- List of Oceanic Landforms
- Marginal sea
- Mediterranean Sea
- Ocean
- Oceanography
- Thermohaline circulation
- Upwelling
- World Ocean Atlas
- World Ocean Circulation Experiment
