= Low-latitude western boundary currents =

Low-latitude western boundary currents (LLWBC) are western boundary currents located between the subtropical gyres, within 20° of the equator. They are important for closing the tropical circulation driven by the equatorial zonal flow, and facilitate inter-ocean transport between the subtropical gyres. They occur in regions of negative (positive) wind stress curl in the southern (northern) hemisphere, and originate at the western bifurcation point of the South or North Equatorial Current. They are typically equatorward (cyclonic) as opposed to sub-tropical western boundary currents, which tend to be poleward (anticyclonic). Some well-known examples include the Mindanao Current (MC) and the East African Coastal Current (EACC).

LLWBCs transport a lot of mass, and bring cooler, saltier, and denser water from the subtropics to the warm, less salty, and less dense waters of the tropics. They are subject to changes in intensity and direction on seasonal and multi-annual timescales because of the annual variance in latitude of the equatorial currents and El Niño-Southern Oscillation.

== LLWBCs in the Atlantic ==
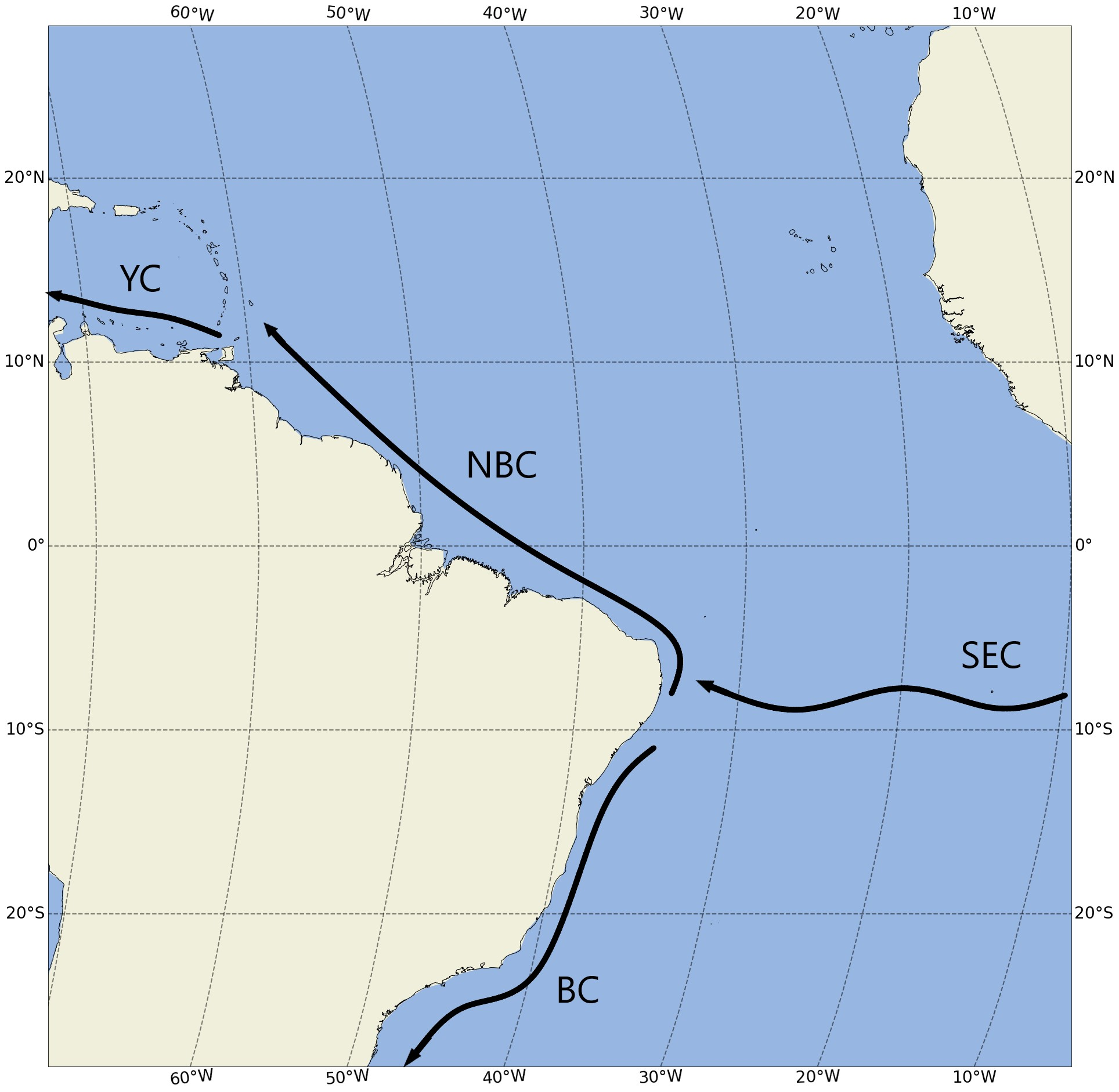
LLWBCs in Atlantic: NBC = North Brazil Current, YC = Yucatan Current. Other currents: BC = Brazil Current, SEC = South Equatorial Current. Other currents like the North Equatorial Current are excluded for simplicity. Based on plots from Sen Gupta et al.

The LLWBC in the Atlantic is the North Brazil Current (NBC). While it does initially transport quite salty water, its salinity changes considerably along its course due to the massive influx of fresh water from the Amazon delta. This influx makes it of vital importance for the transport of colder, relatively fresher water to the Northern Atlantic. Most of the water below 12 degrees that flows through the Caribbean is transported from the South Atlantic by this current.

The NBC develops as the equatorward branch of the South Equatorial Current (SEC), and transports 23 - 26 Sv of seawater along the north Brazil coast towards Venezuela at a speed of approximately 1 m/s. During its journey north it feeds both the North Equatorial Undercurrent (NEUC) and the North Equatorial Countercurrent (NECC) in a series of retroflections between 6°N and 8°N.

Near Barbados, it feeds the Yucatan (or Caribbean) Current (YC), which has a mean transport of 30 Sv.

== LLWBCs in the Indian Ocean ==
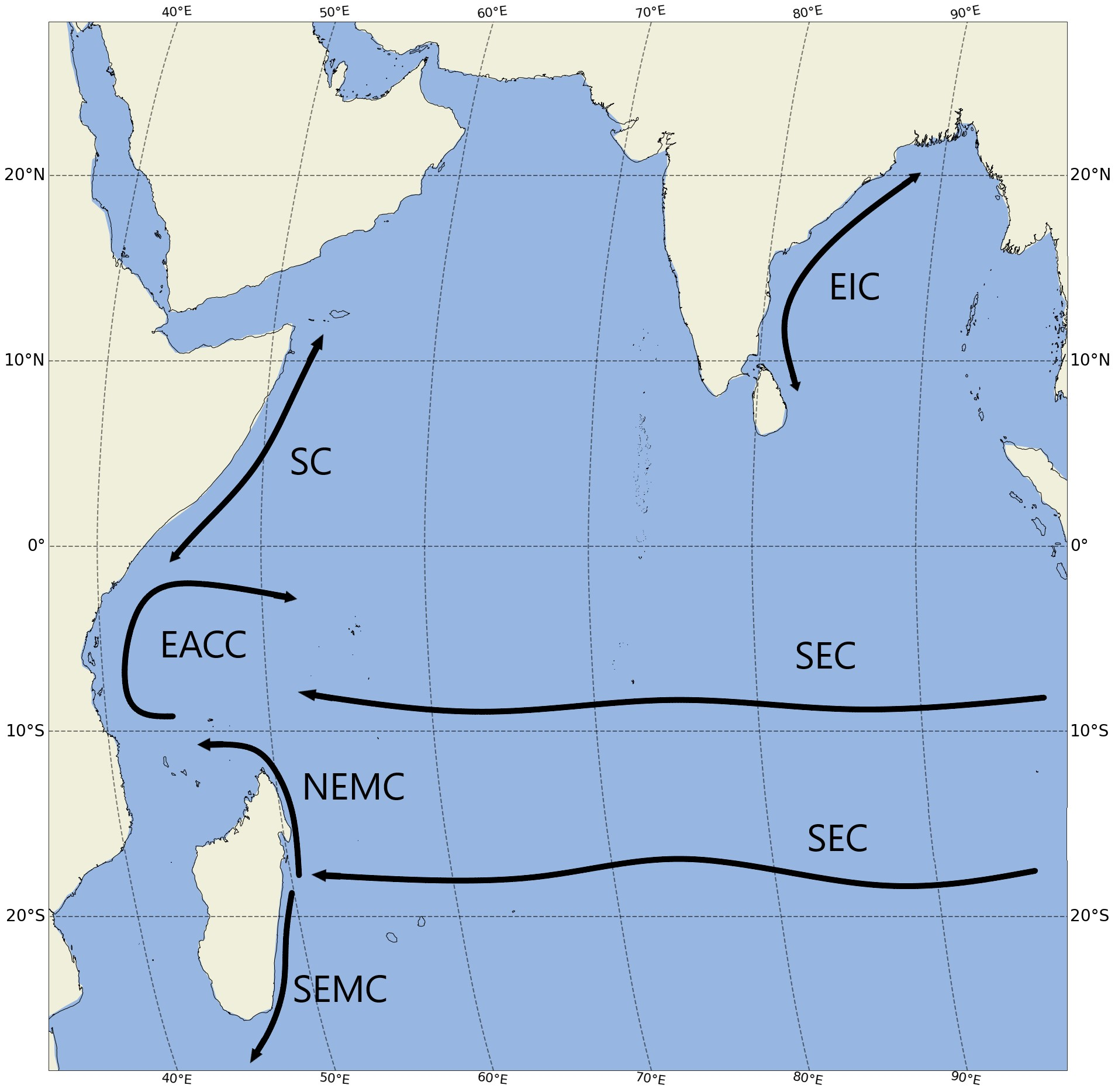
LLWBCs in the Indian Ocean: EACC = East African Coastal Current. Other currents: SC = Somali Current, EIC = East India (Coastal) Current, SEC = South Equatorial Current. Note that in the summer monsoon, SC and EIC are directed towards the south-west, while in the winter monsoon, they are directed towards the north-east. The rest of the monsoon current system is excluded for simplicity. The MZC, which feeds the Agulhas Current, is also not drawn. Based on plots from Sen Gupta et al.

The EACC and the Somali Current (SC) are the principal LLWBCs in the Indian Ocean. The East Indian Coastal Current (EIC) is sometimes considered a LLWBC.

Comparatively fresh water is transported from the maritime continent and the Pacific via the Indonesian Throughflow (ITF) to the western Indian Ocean by the SEC. Near Madagascar, the lower branch of the SEC splits into the North (or North-eastern) and South (or South-Eastern) Madagascar Currents (SMC). The North Madagascar Current (NMC) then splits into the Mozambique Current (MZC) and the EACC. Depending on the season, the EACC (with a peak transport of around 19 Sv at 8°N) will either feed into the northward SC, or converge with the southward SC to form the NECC where it is transported back across the Indian Ocean. Retroflections from the EACC form the South Gyre and Great Whirl.

Both the EIC in the Bay of Bengal and the SC change direction depending on the monsoon. In the case of the EIC, when there is a north-easterly monsoon it is directed towards the south-west, and when there is a south-westerly monsoon it is directed towards the north-east. The SC follows a similar pattern.

== LLWBCs in the Pacific ==
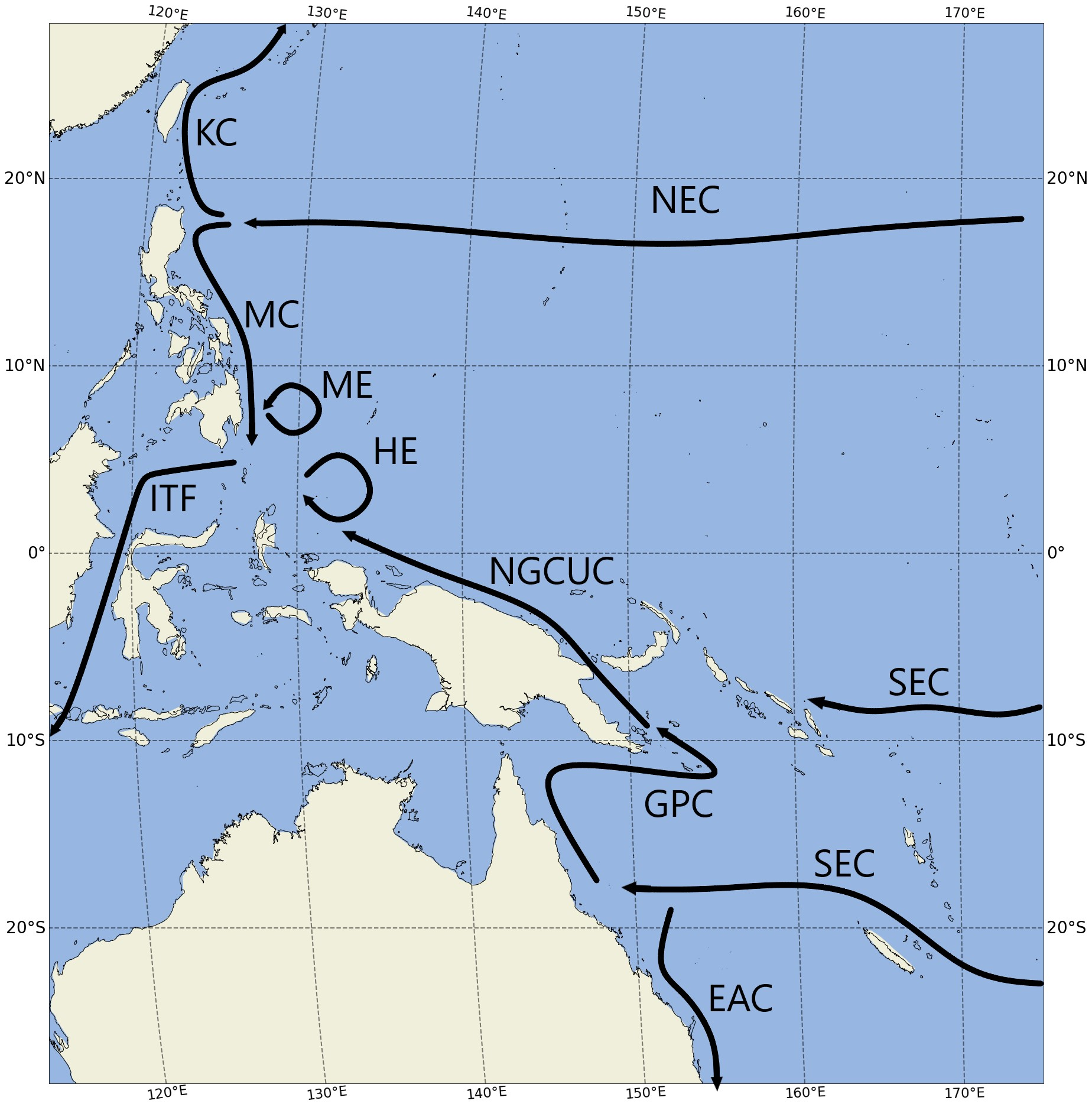
LLWBCs in Pacific: NGCUC = New Guinea Coastal Undercurrent, MC = Mindanao Current, GPC = Gulf of Papua Current. Others currents and eddies: ME = Mindanao Eddy, HE = Halmahera Eddy, NEC = North Equatorial Current, SEC = South Equatorial Current, ITF = Indonesian Throughflow, EAC = East Australian Current. Based on plots from Sen Gupta et al.

The system of LLWBCs in the Pacific is of significant interest because of the irregular topography, the fact that the currents involved modulate the amount of heat and mass entering the Western Pacific Warm Pool, and because they help to air the relatively deep tropical thermocline. Additionally, the convergence of the two LLWBCs marks the source of the ITF, the only major ocean-to-ocean point of leakage on the planet.

The southern of the two LLWBC systems begins just north of the Great Barrier Reef, where a lower limb of the South Equatorial Current splits into the East Australian Current and the Gulf of Papua Current (GPC). The GPC travels around the southern tip of New Guinea and becomes the New Guinea Coastal Undercurrent (NGCU), which is found at depths of 200 to 400 m and is most intense during the SW monsoon, with transport varying between 20 and 29 Sv. The NGCU travels through the Solomon Sea and along the northern New Guinea coast via the Vitiaz Strait, Solomon Strait, or St Georges' Strait. In the Celebes Sea, the NGCU meets the MC. Water masses are recycled through massive eddies and feed the ITF (15 Sv) and the NECC.

Near Luzon, saltier subtropical water in the North Equatorial Current (NEC) bifurcates into the MC and the Kuroshio Current (KC). The MC, with a transport of 15 - 35 Sv, follows the Philippine archipelago to the south before meeting the southern hemisphere waters.

Beneath the MC there is a Mindanao Undercurrent (MUC), which had been thought to be directed poleward, and located precisely underneath the MC. In fact, what actually happens beneath the thermocline is a little bit more complicated. At a large scale (>400 km), there is indeed a more or less constant northward MUC; however, on smaller scales, there is an alternating pattern of poleward and equatorward flows driven by eastward zonal jets found at 7°N, 10°N, 13°N, and 18°N.

The New Guinea Coastal Current (NGCC) also changes direction with the monsoon.

== Mixing in LLWBCs ==
In contrast to sub-tropical western boundary currents, where isopycnal mixing is elevated due to shear stress—which increases as you approach a western boundary—as well as internal wave-breaking, the picture regarding mixing in LLWBC is less clear. Recent experiments have shown that in the Mindanao Eddy (ME) there is relatively less mixing than found in a sub-tropical western boundary current. This may be indicative of LLWBCs in general; however, previous research had suggested the opposite.

== Climate Change ==
As is the case for other western boundary currents, the amount of mass transported by LLWBCs will change in the future. This will be driven by basin-scale changes in the wind field or deep circulation across decades. Transport along the MC and NBC may weaken by 2.3 to 5.6 Sv and -1.7 to -4.7 Sv respectively, while transport along the GPC and the NGCU may intensify by 0.6 to 2.8 Sv and 1.9 to 4.9 Sv respectively. Models also indicate that while currents in the southern Indian Ocean may weaken significantly, the EACC does not appear to be likely to change significantly in strength.

Such climatic-induced changes in circulation are now being recognised as an additional stressor on marine ecosystems. For strengthening LLWBCs such as the GPC, given that they oppose climate change velocities (which are poleward), dispersal of larvae to more thermally-appropriate locations may be more difficult. For weakening LLWBCs such as the MC, such relocation may be made less difficult.
