= North Brazil Current Retroflection =

Ocean current retroflection phenomenon

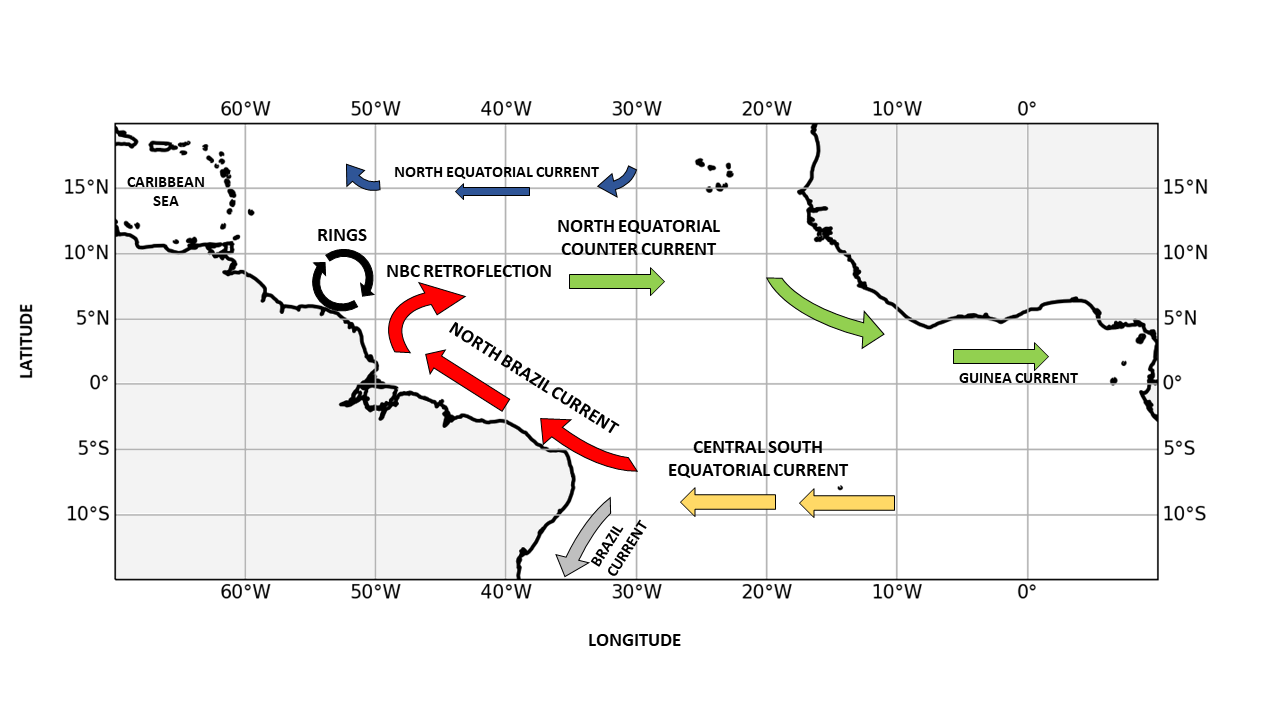
Schematic map of the Atlantic ocean and its surface currents. The NBC rings are formed as the NBC retroflects towards the NECC. Inspired from.

The North Brazil Current (NBC) retroflects north-eastwards and merges into the North Equatorial Counter Current (NECC). The retroflection occurs in a seasonal pattern when there is strong retroflection from late summer to early winter (borreal fall). There is weakened or no retroflection during other times of the year. Just like in the Agulhas Current, the retroflection also sheds some eddies (which are referred to as the NBC rings) that make their way to the Caribbean Sea through the Lesser Antilles.

== Retroflection ==
Retroflection of the NBC occurs off the coastal border between Brazil and Guyana between 4ºN to 7ºN and 48ºW to 50ºW. The NBC begins just off the coast of north-eastern Brazil, approximately around 10ºS and 31ºW where the central South Equatorial Current (cSEC) splits into two. The branch that separates southward along the South American continent is called Brazil Current (BC) and the branch that flows northward is called the NBC. The North Brazil Undercurrent (NBUC), which flows in the sub-surface along with the NBC, retroflects as well. However, before the retroflection, there are multiple points of bifurcation along its trajectory. From its origin, it branches off to feed into the South Equatorial Undercurrent (SEUC), the Equatorial Undercurrent (EUC), and finally retroflects to mix with the North Equatorial Undercurrent (NEUC).

The NBC and the North Brazil Undercurrent (NBUC) combined carry a volume of approx. 35 Sv. Approximately, a total of 28 Sv. of water is turned back because of the retroflection. The water at the surface merges with the NECC while the sub-surface water merges into the NEUC. The remaining water can be attributed to the formation of rings and some leakage into the Caribbean Current (CC).

== Ring Formation ==
Animation of the North Brazil Current (NBC) retroflection and ring formation. The rings and retroflection are present only from summer to late winter. Period Nov 1998 to May 2000. Data from GLORYS12V1 product of the Copernicus Marine Service.

When the NBC is stronger, the retroflection sheds off anticyclonic rings and they propagate along the coast and head towards the Lesser Antilles. Upon contact with the islands, their coherent structure is either reduced or completely destroyed. These rings originate as a result of the retroflection. The retroflection is so severe that the bulge created breaks off and form anticyclonic rings. So, the maximum number of rings are formed when the retroflection is the strongest. The rings show early signs of formation because the baroclinic instability grows in the region and a wavelike perturbation can be seen from early fall. On average, there are 6 rings generated every year with a minimum of 2-3 rings per year.

However, the mechanisms that contribute to the NBC ring formation and how the dynamics of this generation of rings work are not fully understood. Nonetheless, the properties such as the diameter, lifetime, velocity, etc. are well documented. The rings are recorded using surface drifters, satellite observations of altimetry and color scanners. They are also known to be the largest and lowest-latitude rings that originate from any Western Boundary Current.

=== Physical properties ===
NBC rings are characterised by a partly isolated warm-core that can be as large as 450 km of diameter which turns clockwise with an azimuthal speed around 1 m/s. The maximum speed of propagation is observed at the surface but the vertical structure goes even deeper than the thermocline. These rings travel from their area of formation, between 5ºN to 8ºN and 50ºW to 53ºW, until the Lesser Antilles and disperse into the Caribbean Sea. The life span of these rings are typically of 3–4 months and they travel at 8–16 cm/s northwestward. They carry around 1-2 Sv. each ring and are responsible of a total of 6-7 Sv. of water transport towards the islands. At this latitude, NBC rings are responsible for 20% of the total meridional heat transport by the ocean. They are also responsible for the direct mass transport of the Atlantic meridional overturning circulation (AMOC), which accounts for 20-25% of the total upper ocean cross-gyre transport.

=== Impacts of the NBC rings ===
The rings play a big role in the mass and heat transport in the equatorial-tropical gyre. The NBC and its rings also bring in nutrient-rich and fresh water from the Amazon River. As the NBC rings are formed near the mouth of the Amazon, these rings act as a vehicle of transport for the freshwater up to the Caribbean Sea. These water masses with low salinity drift in the sea for a long period of time before they are mixed. This process takes around 100 days after the ring formation.

When these anticyclonic rings make contact with the eastern Caribbean, they cause a disturbance in the circulation pattern of the water and the less saline water affects the local fishery. Larvae fish appeared to be pushed away from their natural habitat which resulted in failure of settlement in the eastern borders of Barbados. This creates a need for migration for the local larvae fish population to other areas in the Caribbean. The fish also suffered from reduced growth rates and reduced survival rates.

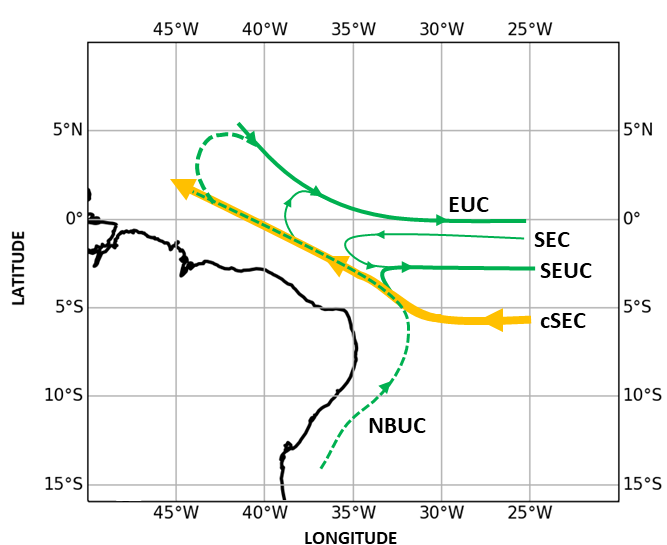
Map of the Undercurrents in the Atlantic ocean over the eastern border of Brazil. The yellow line representing the surface current and the NBC, while the green lines depicting the undercurrents.

== North Brazil Undercurrent ==
=== Formation and Trajectory ===
North Brazil Undercurrent (NBUC) begins much more to the south than the NBC. The NBUC is an extension from the sub-surface current of the southern South Equatorial Current (sSEC). The sSEC travels to the South American continent because of the westward deflection of the Benguela Current from the southeast Atlantic Ocean. When sSEC reaches the Eastern Coast of Brazil, around 15ºS to 20ºS, it splits into two with the northern branch of the bifurcation forming the NBUC.

The core of the flow is 250m deep and the NBUC transports about 24 Sv. (in the upper 1000m) up the Eastern Coast of Brazil. After the northward trajectory reaches 5ºS, the central South Equatorial Current (cSEC) merges with the NBUC, feeding approx. 11 Sv. more. This trajectory continues along the northern coast of Brazil until the NBUC retroflects.

=== Bifurcations and Retroflection ===
Because of the ocean floor topography, the North Brazil Undercurrent (NBUC) retroflects just before the NBC. All of the water carried by the NBUC retroflects completely into the North Equatorial Undercurrent (NEUC). But along its trajectory there are ample points of bifurcation. The bifurcations, even though they transport very little water mass, help understand the mapping of the ocean in the west-Atlantic. First, there is observation of bifurcation at 5ºS towards the South Equatorial Undercurrent (SEUC). After splitting to mix with the SEUC, at about 2ºS, the current birfurcates after moving north and merges with the Equatorial Undercurrent (EUC). Then finally, at around 3ºN, the NBUC retroflexes and merges completely with the North Equatorial Undercurrent (EUC).
