= North Equatorial Current =

Current in the Pacific and Atlantic Oceans

The North Equatorial Current (NEC) is a westward wind-driven current mostly located near the equator, but the location varies from different oceans. The NEC in the Pacific and the Atlantic is about 5°-20°N, while the NEC in the Indian Ocean is very close to the equator. It ranges from the sea surface down to 400 m in the western Pacific.

North Equatorial Current (in black labeled N. Equatorial)

The NEC is driven by the north-hemisphere easterly trade wind. In couple with NEC, there is another current called South Equatorial Current (SEC), generated by the easterly trade wind in the southern hemisphere. Despite the well-coupled name of the two equatorial currents, the distribution of the NEC and the SEC is not in symmetry at the equator, but slightly northward to the equator. This asymmetric distribution is aligned to the location of the Intertropical Convergence Zone (ITCZ), which is the area that the northeast and the southeast trade wind converge.

== Related processes ==
=== The Equatorial Counter Current ===
The NEC and the SEC will generate an Equatorial Counter Current (ECC), named as the North Equatorial Counter Current (NECC) in both Pacific and Atlantic and the South Equatorial Counter Current (SECC) in the Indian Ocean.

The NEC and SEC continuously flow westward. However, the seawater does not just pile up at the west basin surface. The advent water must have gone back to the east by some means. The Sverdrup balance can partly explain where the water ends up at. When the NEC and the SEC reached the west end of a basin, some of the water travels poleward to join the low-latitude circulations, while some travels equatorward to join the Equatorial Counter Current.

=== The Ekman transport ===
The Ekman transport is a wind-driven transport. It occurs due to the rotation of the globe. A transport is found to the right of the flow direction in the northern hemisphere, while to the left of the flow in the southern hemisphere. It is noteworthy that in the tropical regions, where NEC and SEC both flow to the west, a northward Ekman transport in the NEC and a southward Ekman transport in the SEC take place. Due to the fact that the Ekman transport is perpendicular to the flow itself, these Ekman transports contribute to the meridional branch of the NEC and SEC. However, the magnitude of the meridional component is of no comparison to the current itself.

Another subsequent result of the Ekman transport is the upwelling, which occurs in between the NEC and the SEC, where a massive water divergence at the sea surface takes place.

=== Interaction with climate ===
The NEC, the SEC and the ECC play an important role in the climate system causing various of climate patterns, such as El Niño–Southern Oscillation (ENSO), the Atlantic Meridional Mode (AMM), the Atlantic Multidecadal Oscillation (AMO) and the seasonal monsoon in the Indian ocean. Reversely, the climate motion also affects the behavior of the equatorial current itself.

== In different oceans ==
=== Pacific NEC ===
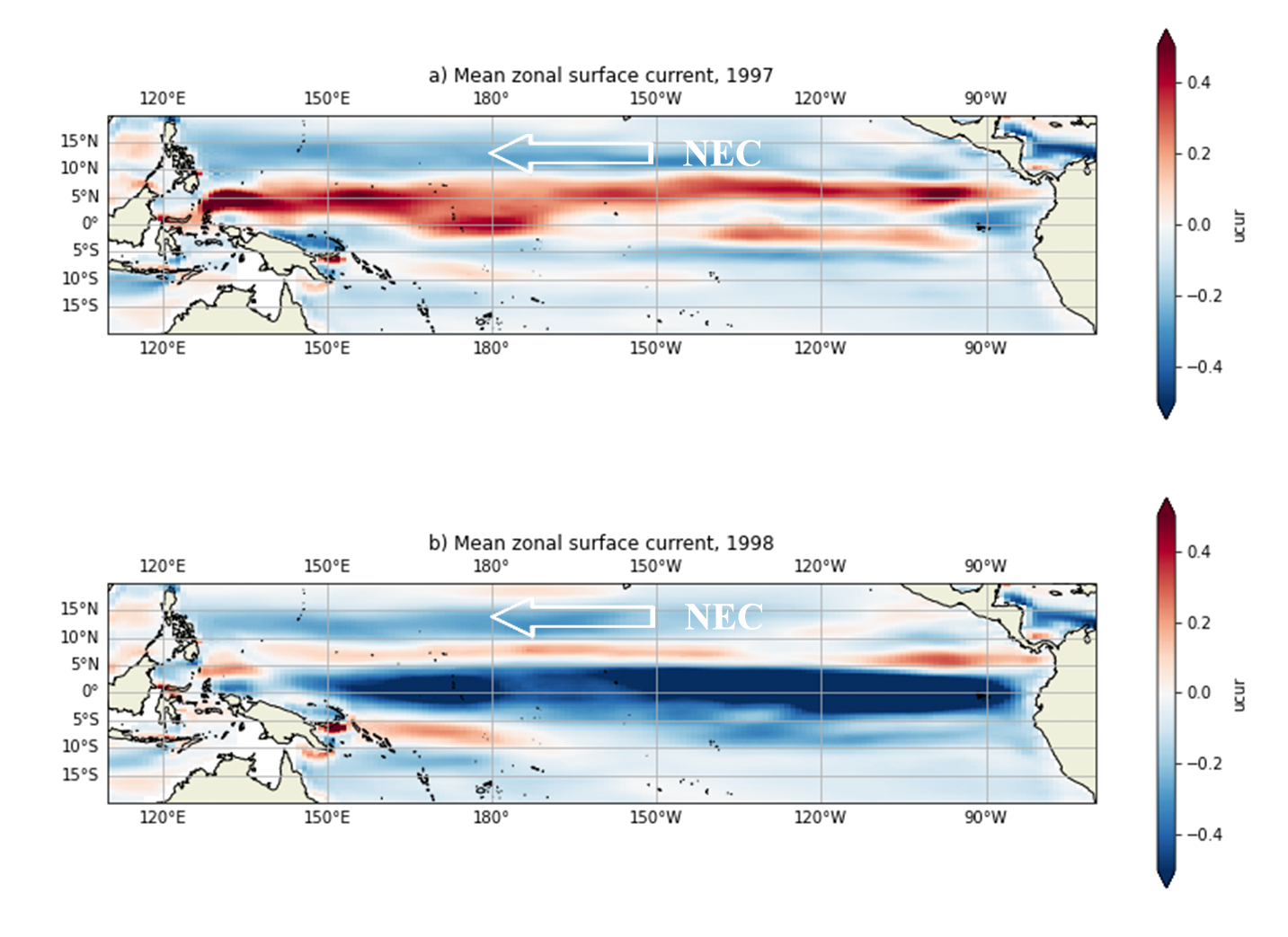
a) and b) show the mean zonal surface velocity in Pacific during El Niño (1997) and La Niña years (1998). Positive values (red) represent eastward flow, negative values (blue) for westward flow. All the data plotted in this article is obtained from the GODAS dataset.

The NEC is evident around 10°-18°N across the entire Pacific basin, from the Philippines to Nicaragua. Its typical zonal velocity is $30 cm\cdot s^{-1}$. The NEC shows little seasonal variability, but an interannual instability. The interannual instability of the NEC is strongly linked to ENSO. The NEC strengthens in La Niña years and weakens in El Niño years.

The meridional component of the NEC, also known as the Ekman transport, is evident northward at any location all the way along with itself. When the current reaches the west end, the Philippines, it splits into two western boundary flows. One of the branches flows poleward feeding the Kuroshio Current, another one flows equatorward feeding the Mindanao Current.

This North Equatorial Current Bifurcation (NECB) plays an important role in the south Asian climate system. As currently, climate change is more and more evident, thus, leading to a more amplified migration of the NECB. As a result, this amplification of the migration may lead to redistribution of the water mass and heat transport along the western boundary, and thus warm pool and monsoon climate.

=== Atlantic NEC ===
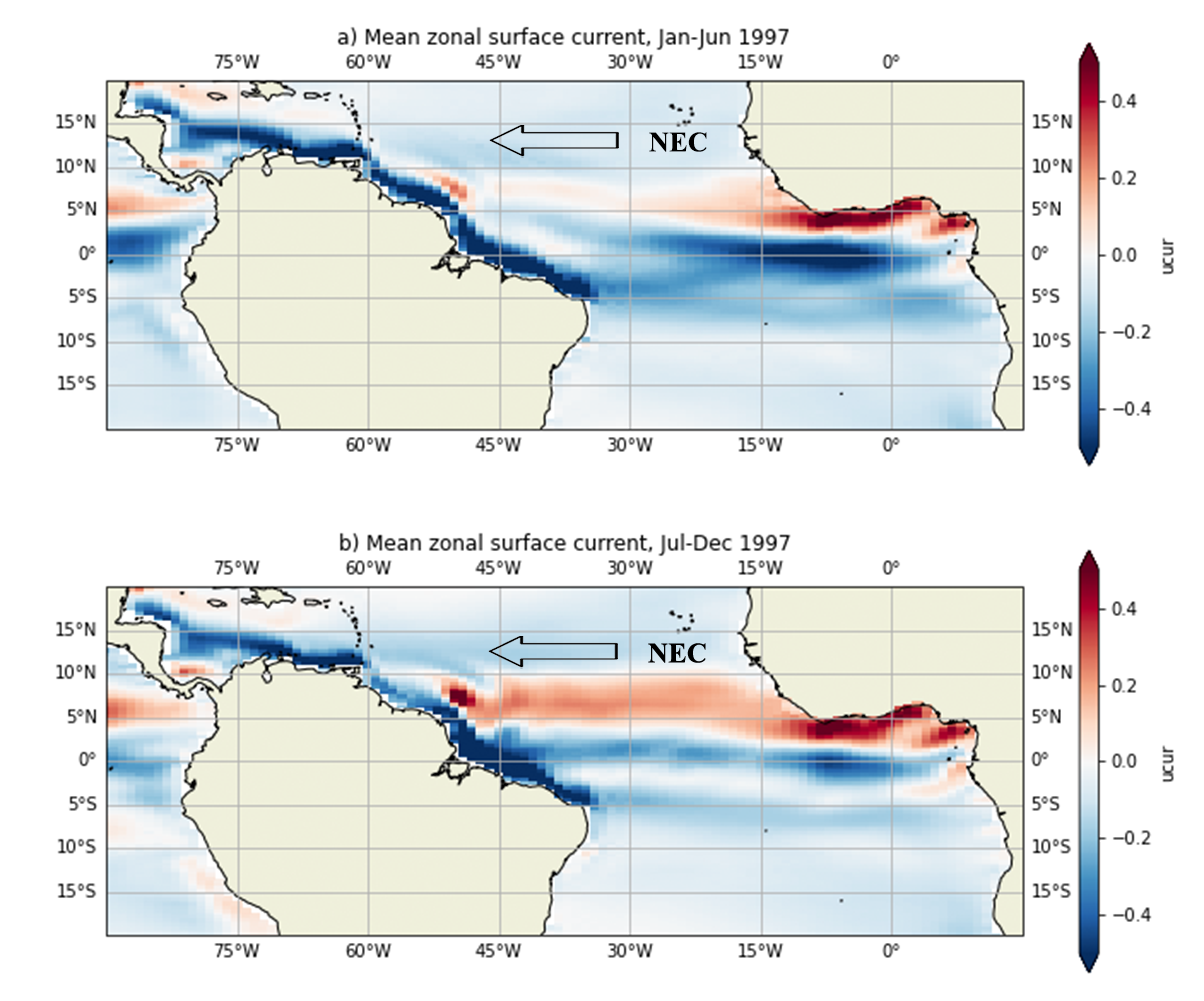
a) shows the mean zonal surface currents within the Atlantic in the first half-year (Jan-Jun) of 1997. b) shows the second half (Jul-Dec). These two figures show a strong seasonality, with NECC stronger during July to December. Positive values (red) represent eastward flow, negative values (blue) for westward flow.

The NEC in the Atlantic is evident around 10°-20°N, spanning the longitude from 16°-60°W. The typical flow velocity is about $10 cm\cdot s^{-1}$, lower than in the Pacific. Instead of interannual variability, the NEC shows a strong seasonality, in which NECC is stronger from July to December, weaker from January to June. Besides, the NEC is more equatorward from January to June.

The NEC splits into two after reaching the north of South America, joining the North Brazil Current (NBC) and the NECC respectively. The northward meridional Ekman transport dominates the tropical Atlantic Ocean, playing a very important role in the northward heat transport. This strong northward surface transport is well known as the upper component of the Atlantic Meridional Overturning Circulation (AMOC). On a seasonal time scale, variability of the heat transport is responsible for the tropical sea temperature anomaly. The temperature anomaly at the sea surface is a possible cause that leads to Atlantic hurricane season.

On the interannual and longer timescales, the equatorial and tropical Atlantic ocean has a strong interaction with the dynamics of several patterns of variabilities, the Atlantic Niño, the Atlantic Meridional Mode (AMM) and the Atlantic Multidecadal Oscillation (AMO).

=== The Indian Ocean NEC ===
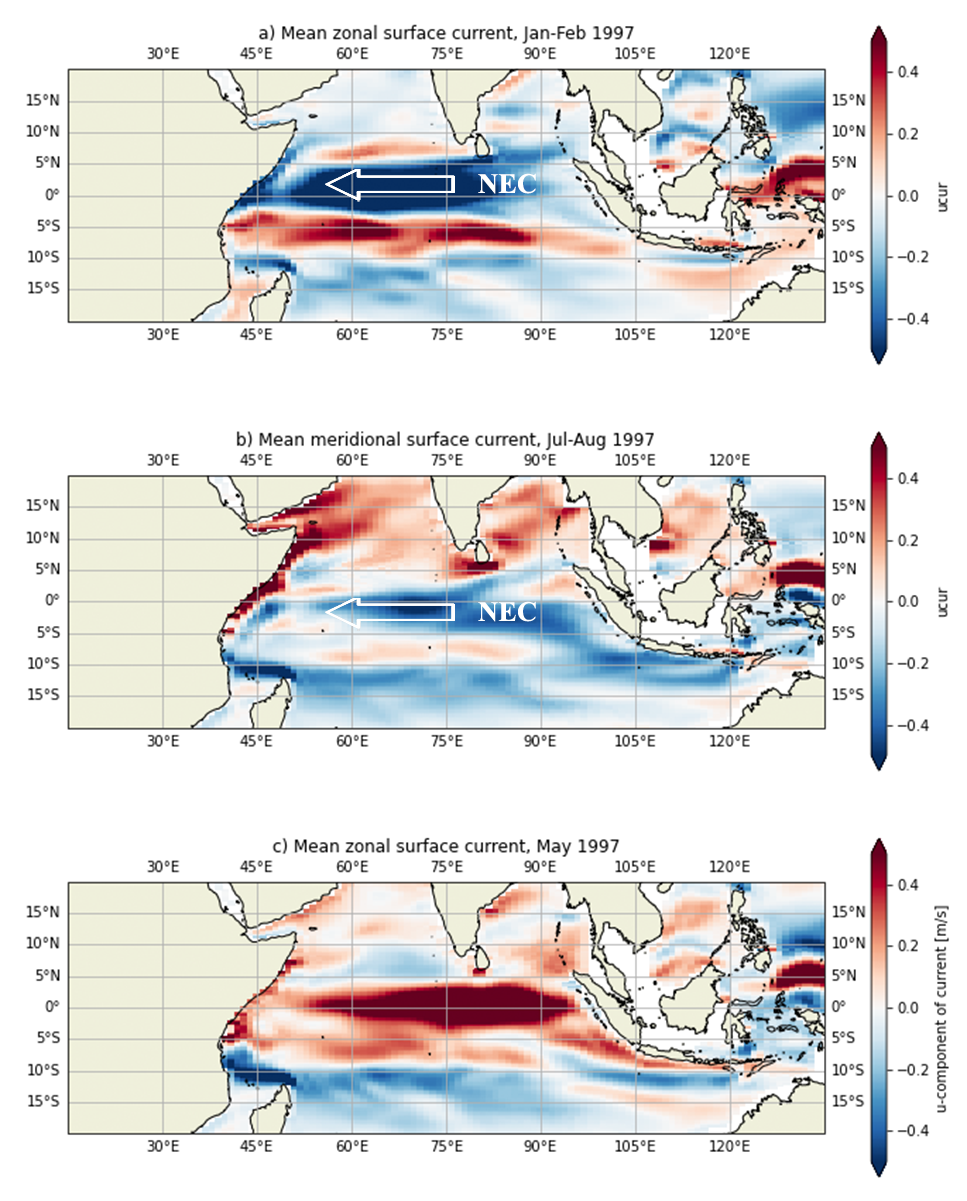
This figure shows the mean zonal surface current of different periods in the Indian Ocean. a), b) and c) are currents during January and February, during July and August, and in May, respectively. Positive values (red) represent eastward flow, negative values (blue) for westward flow.

The NEC in the Indian ocean is strongly affected by the continent to the north. The NEC is more southward than the other two oceans, which drives the Equatorial Counter Current to the southern hemisphere. So, the counter current is called South Equatorial Counter Current (SECC) here.

The NEC sits right on the equator, across a longitude from 45°-100°E. The typical speed in the winter can reach up to $50 cm\cdot s^{-1}$, thanks to the northeast seasonal wind from the continent. In the Indian Ocean, the NEC is faster than the SEC. Multiple reasons are considered. The equator-located NEC receives more solar heat than the more poleward-located SEC, which leads to a much denser but thinner upper layer for the NEC. The current flows faster in the thinner layer. Another reason is the smaller Coriolis effect at the equator. The NEC, thus, is more aligned to the westward wind on the equator.

The NEC shows a very strong seasonal pattern. During January and February, thanks to the prevailing northeast wind, the NEC travels all the way to the east coast of Somalia and joins the Somali Current flowing towards the southwest to feed the SECC. As a result, SECC is strong during the winter. And at this time, the NEC carries surface waters from the southern Bay of Bengal to the southern Arabian Sea. While during July and August, the location of the NEC moves southward and the Somali Current reverses. As a result, the NEC and the SEC feed Somali Current instead of the SECC. So, the SECC becomes very weak. Due to the prevailing southwest wind in the summer, the surface waters move from the southern Arabian Sea to the southern Bay of Bengal.

During the transition of these two phases, specifically around May and November, the NEC becomes very weak, almost invisible in Figure 3. Instead of the NEC, a strong eastward current is found near the equator, known as the Wyrtki jets.

== See also ==
- Ocean current
- Oceanic gyres
- Physical oceanography
- Equatorial Counter Current
