= Godfrey Island Rule =

Oceanographical theory

The Godfrey Island Rule is a generalization of the Sverdrup balance that overcomes a key limitation of Sverdrup's 1947 formulation for the relation of ocean currents to wind forcing, which could not be extended west of an interrupting island. This was a particular problem with the position of Australia between the Pacific and Indian Oceans; Godfrey's result showed the dynamical connection between the wind-driven circulations of both oceans.

== History ==
The Sverdrup balance (1947) was a monumental achievement in dynamical oceanography that clarified the large-scale response of ocean currents to wind forcing. It was followed quickly by Stommel and Munk's extensions to Sverdrup's theory that showed how the great ocean gyres explained by Sverdrup could be completed by western boundary currents. These three results enabled a consistent dynamical understanding of wind-driven currents in ocean basins like the Atlantic and the North Pacific that have continuous eastern and western coastlines and could be considered largely closed at their northern ends, but the South Pacific and Indian Oceans are connected not only by the Southern Ocean but by the open channel of the Indonesian Throughflow (ITF). The Sverdrup/Stommel/Munk results provided no framework to constrain either the flows of the South Pacific, with its two exits in the west, or the Indian Ocean with its two corresponding entrances. What determined how much water could flow through the ITF? What controlled meridional transport through the South Pacific? What are the relative roles of wind vs thermohaline (density) forcing? In the 40 years after Sverdrup, Stommel and Munk, accumulating observational and water property evidence (see Thermohaline circulation) showed that the ITF carried substantial flow from the South Pacific to the Indian Ocean, but no theory was available to explain how this was controlled or how large it should be. Godfrey's (1989) methodology provided this explanation, using assumptions and dynamics of comparable simplicity to the work of Sverdrup and Stommel.

== Derivation ==
=== Sverdrup fundamentals ===
Sverdrup made simplifying assumptions by neglecting friction (except that of the wind stress on the ocean surface), time variability (thus the Sverdrup balance represents the mean state), and the advective (nonlinear) terms of the Navier-Stokes equations, and by considering only the top-to-bottom vertically integrated currents in a flat-bottomed ocean. These are consequential restrictions that remove - in addition to thermohaline influences - many factors affecting ocean circulation, including mixing, boundary currents, and the ability to describe the vertical structure, but nevertheless reproduce in broad strokes the large-scale features of the currents.

With Sverdrup's simplifying assumptions, the barotropic momentum equations become

| $- f V = -P_x + {\tau^x}$ | 1 |

| $~~~ f U = -P_y + {\tau^y}$ | 2 |

with the continuity equation

| $U_x + V_y = 0$ | 3 |

where upper-case variables are vertically integrated, $f$ is the Coriolis parameter, $U$ and $V$ are the eastward and northward velocity components, $P$ is the (integrated) pressure, $\tau$ is the wind stress (direction indicated by superscripts $x,y$), subscripts indicate derivatives. For simplicity of notation, both $P$ and $\tau$ are understood to be divided by the background density of seawater $\rho_0$, thus the units of $P_{x,y}$ and $\tau$ are m^{2}/s^{2}. Sverdrup's top-to-bottom vertical integration in steady state leads to the simplified (non-divergent) continuity equation.

The simplified momentum equations (1) and (2) can be expressed as sums of the well-known geostrophic and Ekman flow types: $(U,V)=(U,V)_{geostrophic}+(U,V)_{Ekman}$.

Sverdrup's analysis proceeded with the crucial first step of taking the Curl of the momentum equations, using $\beta = \partial f /\partial y$ to define the variation of the Coriolis parameter with latitude ($\beta$ is approximated as a constant). Then use continuity to remove the $(U_x+V_y)$ term. (See Sverdrup balance).

In regions where the simplifying assumptions hold, the result defines the meridional transport $V$ entirely in terms of the wind:

| $\beta V = Curl(\tau)$. | 4 |

=== Godfrey's approach ===
==== Momentum equations expressed as pressure (western boundary currents) ====
Godfrey derived his extension to Sverdrup using an unconventional method, writing the momentum equations in terms of pressure. Thus (1) and (2) become:

| $P_x = f V + {\tau^x}, ~~ P_y = -f U + {\tau^y}$ | 1',2' |

The pressure can be evaluated from the wind using ($1'$) and $(2')$ for the pathway A–B–C in Figure 1.

For pathway A–B against the coast, set $U=0$ in $(2')$ because cross-shore (here, zonal) flow must be zero, thus representing an alongshore wind $\tau^y$ balanced by an alongshore ocean pressure gradient: $P_B - P_A = \int_A^B \tau^y dy$. (Here and below, it is assumed for simplicity that the coast runs north–south, but it is straightforward to define a sloped or curved coastline).

The integration is continued from the coast at B westward to an interior-ocean point C using Sverdrup's $V$ from (4) in $(1')$, thus $P_C-P_B=-\int_{B}^{C} \left[\tau^x+ f Curl(\tau) / \beta\right]dx$ (schematically $fV_{geostrophic} = -fV_{Ekman} + fV_{Sverdrup}$). This calculation, repeated for each latitude B, then along each longitude to C, gives the complete pressure field relative to point A, everywhere east of a thin western boundary layer (Figure 2 is an example).

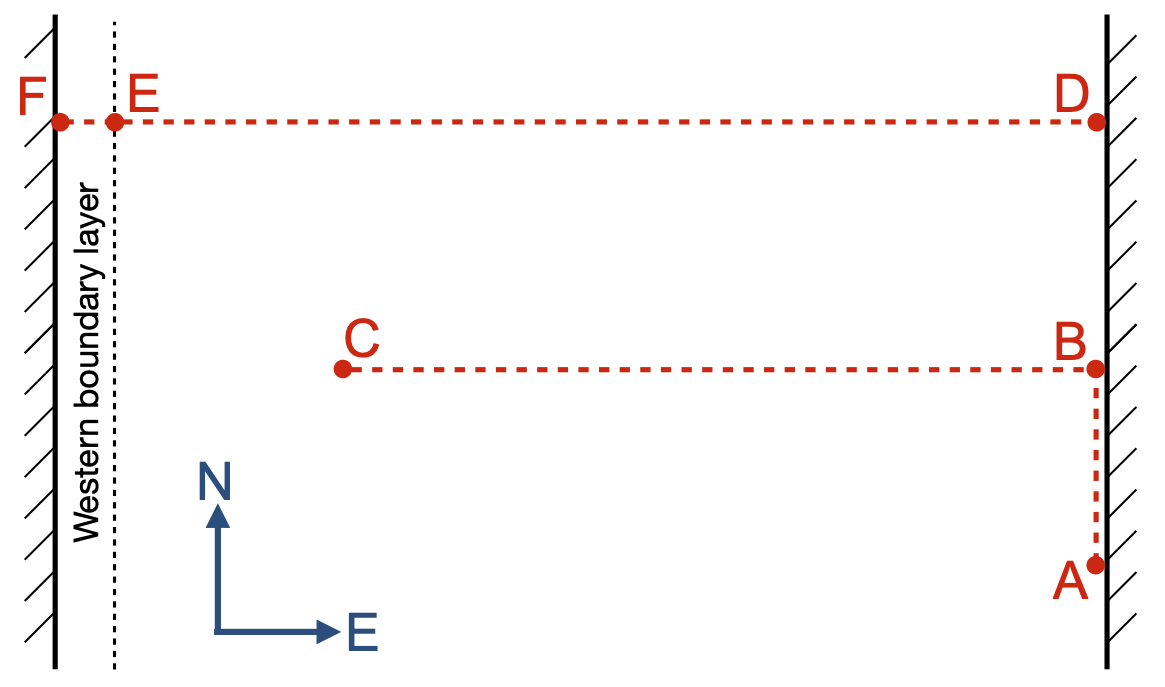
Figure 1. Schematic diagram of the Godfrey integrals

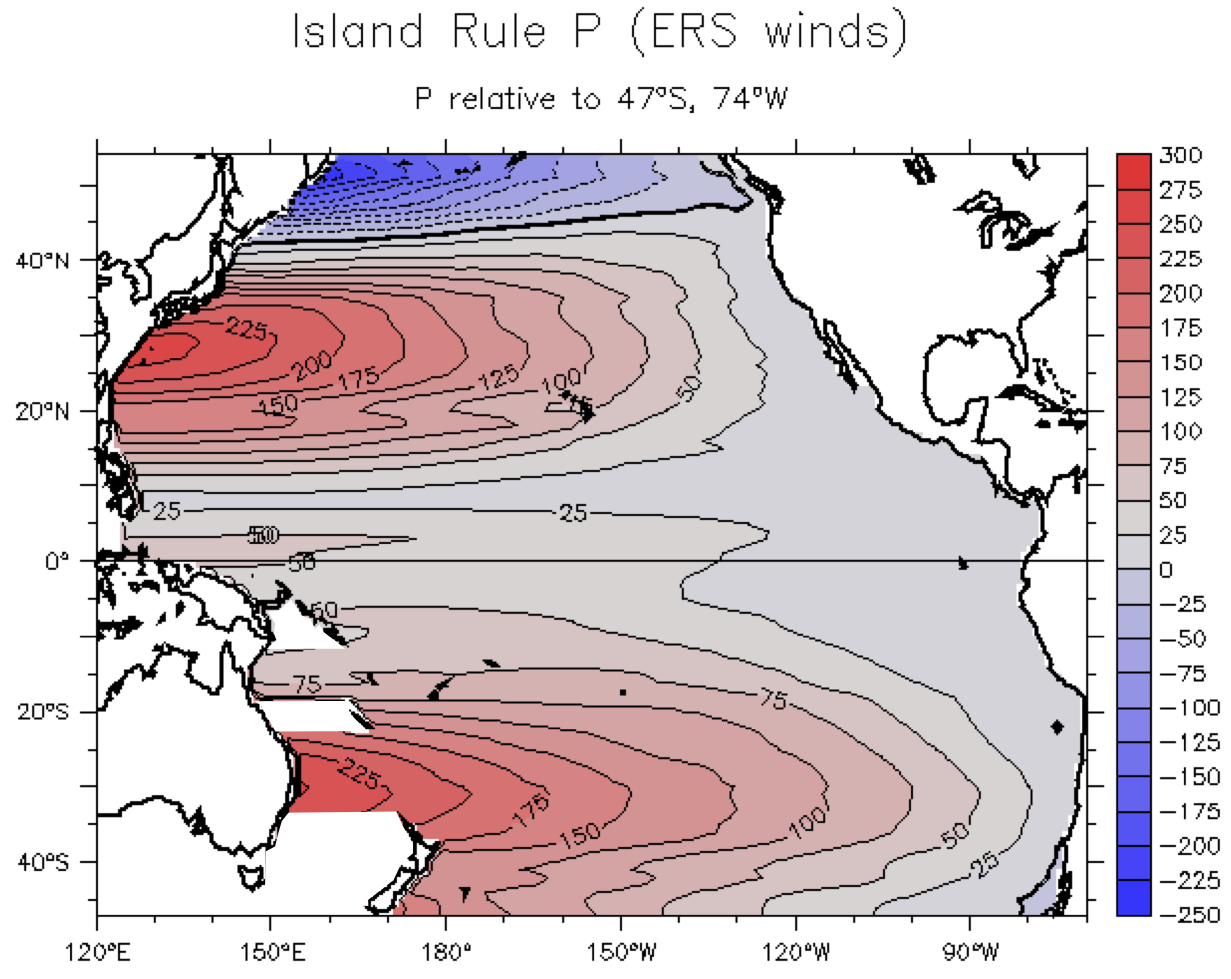
Figure 2. Pacific pressure field relative to 47°S,74°W on the coast of Chile calculated from mean winds (ERS) using Godfrey's method illustrated in Figure 1. Note the blank areas west of New Zealand, New Caledonia, the Solomon Islands chain and Australia-New Guinea beyond which the integration in Figure 1 cannot be continued.

However, without accounting for the boundary layer, where equations (1)-(4) are not valid because of the Sverdrupian neglect of frictional and non-linear terms, the integrations cannot be carried further. In the spirit of Stommel (1948), Godfrey added terms $X,Y$ representing unspecified stresses due to lateral and bottom friction, assuming that they were negligible away from the fast western boundary currents (thus, east of the boundary layer the Sverdrup solution does not change; in effect the boundary layer is appended to the interior solution). The augmented momentum equations become

| $- f V = -P_x + {\tau^x} +X$ | 5 |

| $~~~ f U = -P_y + {\tau^y} +Y$ | 6 |

The continuity equation (3) remains as before.

Godfrey additionally argued that the boundary layer is thin enough (relative to the width of the ocean) that winds within it can be ignored. Since the western boundary current (WBC) is strictly alongshore, cross-shore flow $U$ is zero, thus there are no zonal frictional stresses $X$. With these stipulations, (5) and (6) in the boundary layer reduce to:

$$\begin{aligned}
-fV &= -P_x\\
0 &= -P_y+Y
\end{aligned}$$

The first of these says that longshore flow $V$ in the boundary layer is geostrophic; the second that the longshore momentum balance is between the longshore pressure gradient $P_y$ and longshore friction $Y$. As Stommel had shown, this allows western boundary currents to complete the Sverdrupian gyres (e.g., the two subtropical gyres seen in Figure 2; for example the higher pressure along the western boundary near 25°N than near 40°N supports the Kuroshio Current off Japan by balancing alongshore friction). Note that this simple formulation defines only the transport of the WBC, saying nothing about its width or structure.

Now, the pressure integration can be defined for the entire coast-to-coast path D–E–F:

| $P_D-P_F = \int_{FED}\tau^x dx + f\, T_0$ | 7 |

where $T_0$ (which remains unknown) is the total (coast-to-coast) meridional transport, namely the sum of the Sverdrup transport across the interior path from D to E (similar to the path B–C found above), plus the geostrophic transport of the western boundary current. Schematically, (7) is $fV_{geostrophic} = -fV_{Ekman} + fV_{total}$ .

In a closed basin in steady state there can be no net transport across a section like FED, so $T_0=0$. This is the situation for the Atlantic and the North Pacific; the transport of the WBC exactly balances the interior Sverdrup transport: $V_{WBC} = - \int_{ED} (Curl(\tau)/\beta)dx$. But an island allows flow to go around either side. Even though the interior-ocean circulation east of the island may be fully defined by the Sverdrup balance, in the presence of an island $T_0$ is unknown so the Sverdrup/Stommel formulation outlined above cannot speak to the transport contribution of the island's WBC. This is the problem that Godfrey aimed to resolve.

==== The Island Rule ====
Consider an island west of a continent as sketched in Figure 3. Note that although $T_0$ is not known, the same transport must flow across both sections Q–R and T–S.

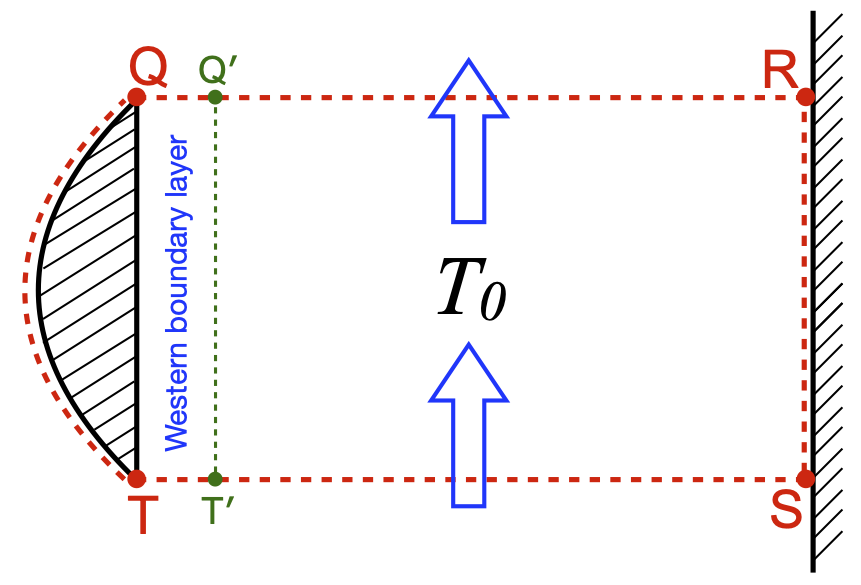
Figure 3. Schematic diagram for evaluating the Godfrey wind integrals.

Godfrey could then define the pressure difference between Q and T along the path T–S–R–Q with the method above: use equation (7) for the two zonal sections Q–R and T–S, and $(2')$, with U=0, for the alongshore path R–S. Since $T_0$ is multiplied by $f$ in (7), the different values of $f$ at the latitudes of $T$ and $Q$ must be taken into account:

$P_Q - P_T = \int_{TSRQ} \tau^l dl + (f_T-f_Q)T_0$ ,

where $l$ and $dl$ are alternately $x,y$ and $dx,dy$ along the path T–S–R–Q. This gives an expression for $\Delta P$ between Q and T.

Godfrey realized that he could write a second expression for the alongshore pressure difference Q–T on the west side of the island, analogous to that for the path S–R, again specifying $U=0$ in ($2'$): $P_Q - P_T = \int_Q^T \tau^y dy$

Equating these two expressions for $P_Q - P_T$, then solving for $T_0$, Godfrey obtained his "Island Rule" defining the total transport between the island and the continent to its east, entirely as a function of the wind. The resulting integral is taken counterclockwise along the closed path T–S–R–Q–T (red dashes in figure 3):

| $T_0 = \frac{1}{f_Q-f_T} \oint_{TSRQT} \tau^l dl$ , | 8 |

where $l$ again indicates the along-path direction.

Once $T_0$ is defined, the western boundary transport along the island's east coast can be found as the difference between $T_0$ (constant over the latitude range of the island) and the Sverdrup transport at each latitude $T_{Sv}(y)=Curl(\tau (y))/\beta$.

==== A more physically intuitive derivation ====
The connection between ocean dynamics and along-path winds around the boundary of a region as in (8) might not be immediately obvious. This is clarified by Green's Theorem, which states that the line integral of a vector quantity around a closed curve equals the area integral of its Curl over that region.

Oceanographers usually think of western boundary currents as closing the interior (Sverdrup) zonal transport (see Sverdrup balance). A more physically intuitive derivation makes this explicit.

Add and subtract the along-path wind integral along the inner path $Q'T'$ (green line east of the western boundary layer in Figure 3) to divide the region into two: First, an integral around the inner path (box from the continental coast $RS$ to the offshore edge of the island's western boundary layer $Q'T'$, thus including only the region where the circulation can be assumed Sverdrupian); second, an integral around the island including its western boundary layer:

$T_0 = \frac{1}{f_Q-f_T} \left[ \;\; \oint\limits_{{TSRQT}} \tau^l dl \;\; + \int\limits_{{Q'T'}} \tau^l dl \;\; - \int\limits_{{Q'T'}} \tau^l dl \; \right] = \frac{1}{f_Q-f_T} \left[ \;\; \oint\limits_{{T'SRQ'T'}} \tau^l dl \;\; + \oint\limits_{Island} \tau^l dl \right]$

The inner-path integral (first term in the last equality above) can be simplified using Green's Theorem, approximating $\beta \approx (f_Q-f_T)/\Delta y$, then recognizing that Sverdrup $V_{Sv} = Curl(\tau)/\beta :$

$\frac{1}{f_Q-f_T} \oint\limits_{{T'SRQ'T'}} \tau^l dl = \frac{1}{\beta \Delta y} \iint \limits_{T'SRQ'T'} Curl(\tau) \, dy \, dx =\int_{x=T'Q'}^{x=RS} \left[ \frac{1}{\Delta y} \int \limits_{y=T'S}^{y=Q'R} \frac{Curl \tau}{\beta} dy \right] \, dx ~ = \int_{x=T'Q'}^{x=RS} \overline{V_{Sv}} \, dx = \overline{T_{Sv}} \;,$

where the overbars indicate a meridional average: $\overline{T_{Sv}}$ is the average Sverdrup meridional transport in the inner box $T'SRQ'T'$.

Thus the alternate expression for the Island Rule is the inner-box average Sverdrup transport plus the wind integral around the island:

| $T_0 = \overline{T_{Sv}} + \frac{1}{f_Q-f_T} \oint_{Island} \tau^l dl$, | 9 |

In addition to being easier to calculate the area-integral of the Curl than long path-integrals of the wind (which generally involve complicated curved coastlines), the circumisland wind term is usually (not always) small and can often be ignored. $T_0$ from (9) for the significant islands of the South Pacific is shown in Figure 6.

Neglecting the circumisland term, (9) states that

- The WBC against the island is due only to the variation of $T_{Sv}$ with latitude ($T_0$ is a single number for the island), so if $T_{Sv}$ is constant in y, there will be no WBC: $T_{WBC}(y)=T_0-T_{Sv}(y)$).
- According to the Mean Value Theorem, there must be a zero WBC at some point along the island: The WBC against an island must either be identically zero or include a bifurcation.
- Unlike the path integral of wind east of a continent, which can support a large alongshore pressure gradient, the WBC against an island will usually provide only a small part of the net transport $T_0$ east of the island.
- Since $U_{Sv}=-dT_{Sv}/dy$ (see Sverdrup balance), (9) emphasizes the role of the Sverdrup zonal transport feeding (or removing) mass to the western boundary region, which is the intuitive picture of how a western boundary current is driven.
- With $T_0 \approx \overline{T_{Sv}}$ in (9), the Island Rule passes the east-side meridional-average wind stress curl to its west side as a single streamfunction value ($T_0$) that resets the subsequent westward integration; note the flat streamfunction regions west of islands in Figure 5. If $T_0$ is not the same as that of the streamfunction in the regions north or south of the island tips, as will commonly be the case, the discontinuity will produce jets extending west along the streamfunction gradient at the latitudes of T and Q.

== Illustration from observed winds ==
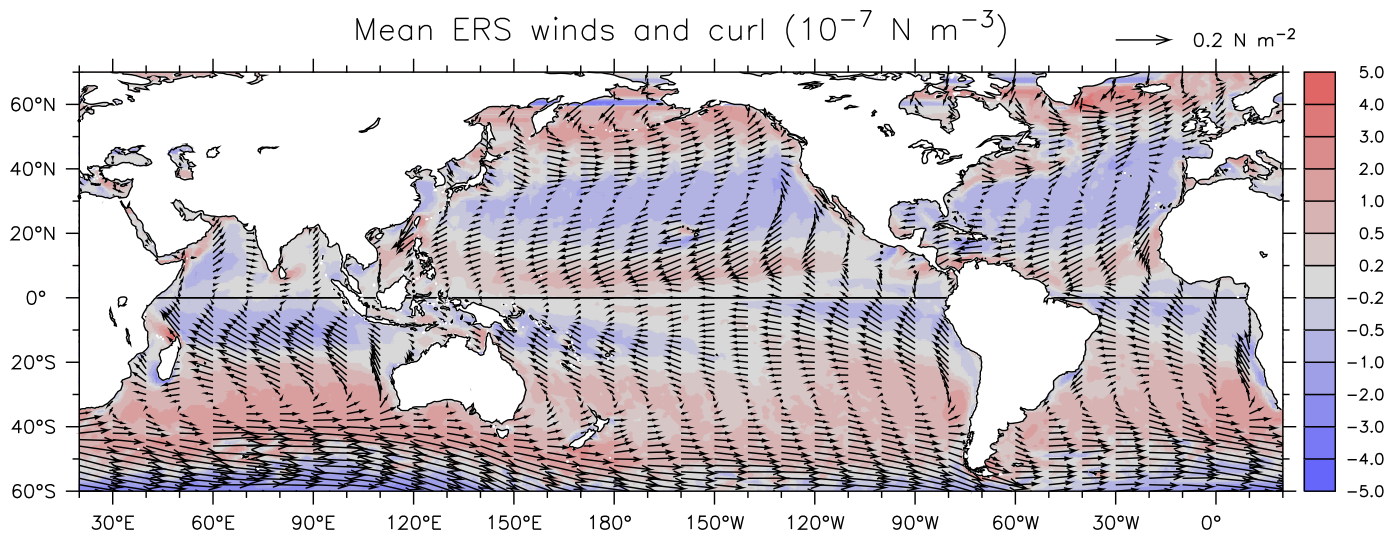
Figure 4. Global mean wind stress (vectors; scale at top right) and their curl (color shading, scale at right) from the European Space agency, averaged over 1991-2000. This wind and curl field has been used for the example calculations shown here.

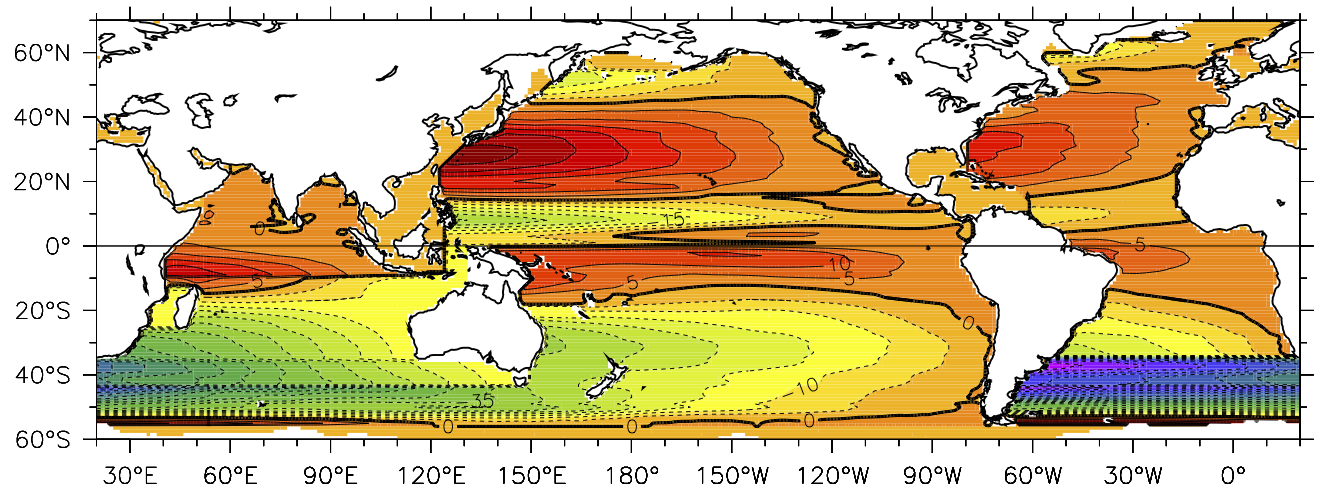
Figure 5. Ocean current streamfunction calculated from the mean ERS winds using the Godfrey Island Rule. Currents are along contours with the higher values to their right. Units are Sv (1 Sv=$10^{6}m^{3} s^{-1}$)

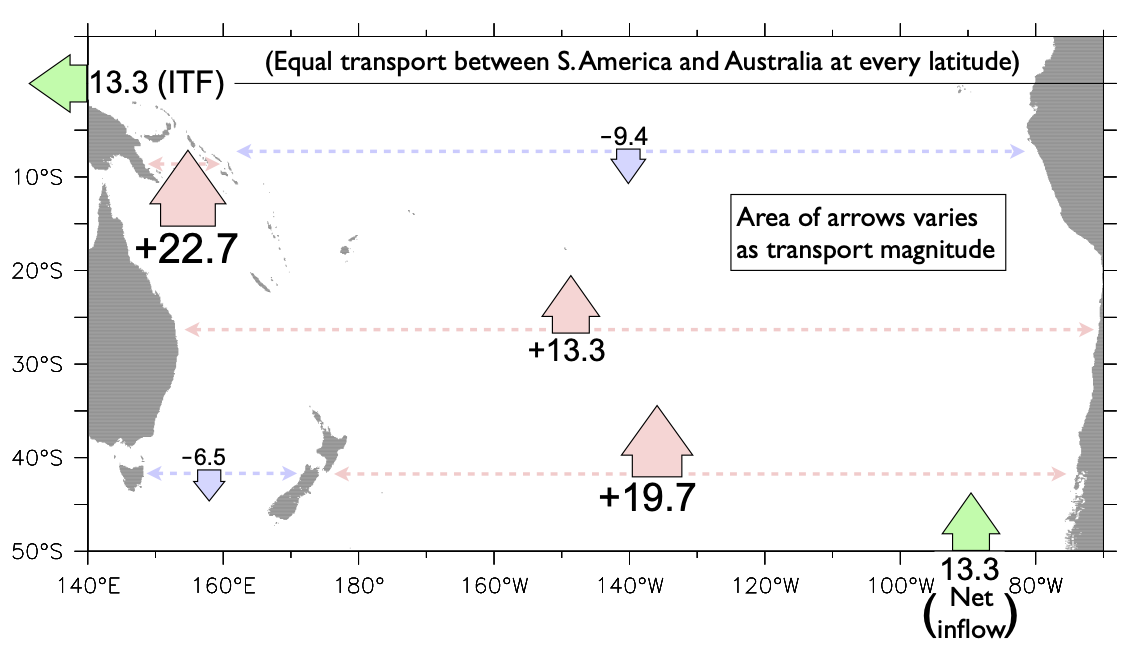
Figure 6. Meridional transport (Sv) in the South Pacific, including both the interior and western boundary currents, calculated from the ERS winds by the Godfrey method. Each arrow shows the transport between the land mass pairs of South America, New Zealand, Australia/New Guinea, and the Solomon Islands. Pink arrows are northward, blue southward; dashed horizontal arrows show the coast-to-coast range represented. Green arrows indicate the implied Indonesian Throughflow transport and corresponding entering transport from the Southern Ocean (13.3$\$Sv according to these winds). The area enclosed by each arrow symbol is proportional to the transport magnitude ($T_0$ from (9)), with the value in Sv written by the arrow. Note that transport between South American and Australia is equal at each latitude.

Some calculations from observed winds are shown to illustrate the results of the Godfrey method. The windfields used here (Figure 4) were made by the European Remote-Sensing Satellite ERS-1 and 2 Scatterometers, on a 1 degree grid, averaged over 1991-2000, with the resulting streamfunction shown in Figure 5, relative to a point on the southwest coast of Chile (47°S,74°W, chosen to be point A in Figure 1). Ocean currents flow along streamfunction contours with higher values to their right; contour intervals are every 5 Sv.

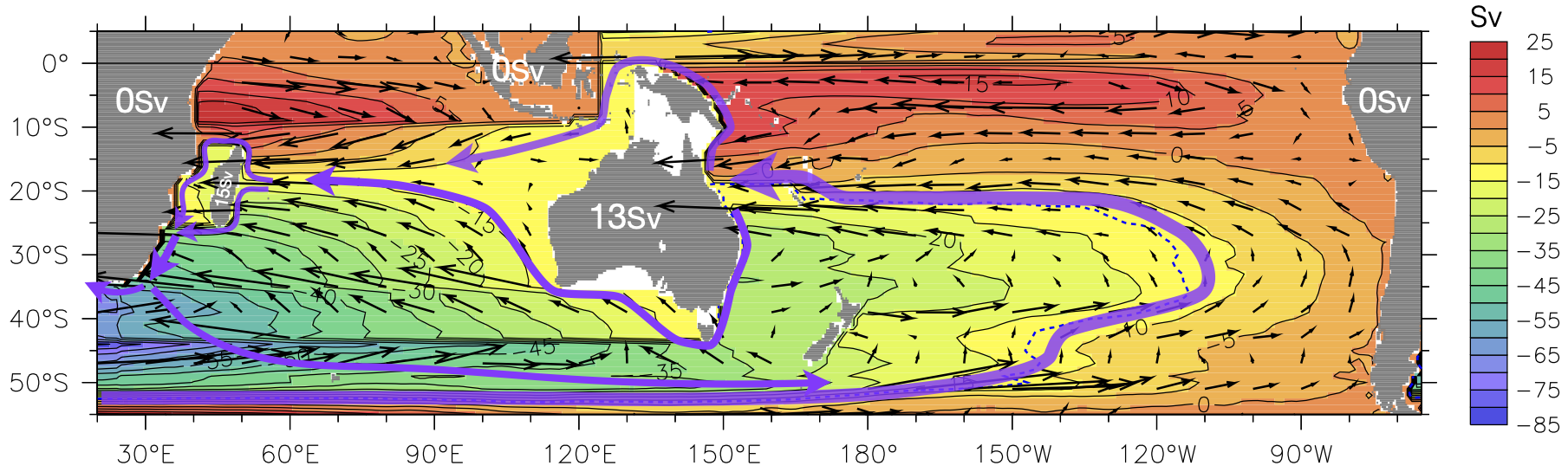
Figure 7. Ocean current streamfunction from the mean ERS winds (detail of Figure 5), showing the Southern Hemisphere supergyre (purple overlaid arrows). White text shows the value of $T_0$ at each landmass.

With the WBCs assumed to be only 1° longitude wide, they are almost invisible in Figure 5; most of the visible points plotted are the result of a traditional Sverdrup calculation, with the contribution of the Island Rule being to determine the eastern origin of its westward integration. The streamfunction equals zero around the entire coast of the assumed-connected supercontinent including the Americas, Asia, Europe and Africa; in effect Bering Strait is assumed to be closed. The Island Rule's largest importance is to the connected South Pacific-Indian Ocean circulation and the role of the Indonesian Throughflow. Other significant islands whose circulations have been analyzed in Island Rule terms include New Zealand (which influences the $T_0$ estimate for Australia by a multi-island Rule), New Caledonia (which generates jets that shift the origin latitude of the East Australian Current), Vanuatu (which produces a jet dipole that generates eddies in the Coral Sea), the Solomon Island chain, the North Hawaiian Ridge Current, and Madagascar (which splits the South Equatorial Current and contributes to the distribution of flow around the southern tip of Africa). One publication applies a modified Island Rule to explain the East Greenland Current.

The combined circulation of the South Pacific and Indian Oceans has been called the "Southern Supergyre", in which the subtropical gyres are connected via the ITF and can influence each other (sketched in Figure 7). This figure labels the values of $T_0$ from (9) (white text) within Australia, Madagascar, and notes its zero value on the assumed-connected continents of South America, Asia and Africa. The transport between any land pair is the difference, thus the wind-driven ITF transport estimated in this calculation is the Australia-Asia difference, about 13 Sv. Island Rule estimates from other wind products are similar, usually within 10-16 Sv (which was Godfrey's (1989) estimate). These are close to ITF transport estimated from direct measurements in the Indonesian seas; the most complete observational survey estimated mean transport to be 15 Sv, with noted modulation associated with El Niño–Southern Oscillation. Thus the simple Ekman+geostrophic+coastal friction dynamics of the Island Rule appears to give a realistic representation of the transport of this complex piece of the ocean circulation, if not its full detail.

== Weaknesses of the linear formulation ==
The Island Rule method has weaknesses in common with the Sverdrup balance on which it is based. In general these fail where the omitted nonlinear terms are an important part of the dynamics, typically in eddy-rich regions. This appears where western boundary currents turn offshore, e.g., of the Kuroshio off northern Japan and the Gulf Stream of the northeast Atlantic, both of which appear smooth and linear in the Sverdrup representation but in reality are a series of loops and strong eddies. These are thought to be due to the western boundary overshooting the latitude range of the gyre that they are completing. A related nonlinear process may occur at the tips of an island. If, as noted in the last bullet below (9), westward jets are generated at the island tips, those are likely to break down into eddies. Such jets are seen as unrealistic packed contours in Figure 5: south of Indonesia extending across the Indian Ocean, from Cape Leeuwin at the southwest tip of Australia, and from the tip of Tasmania.

A similar-appearing jet appears extending west from the southern tip of Africa, however this might be a different phenomenon. As the Agulhas Current, carrying the southward WBC of the Indian Ocean subtropical gyre, passes around the tip, it sheds vigorous eddies both into the Atlantic and retroflecting into the Indian Ocean. These are not represented in Sverdrup dynamics (equations (1)-(3)), which provides no mechanism for dissipating the eddy energy; it can only develop a spurious westward jet extending across the Atlantic as seen in Figure 5.

A second weakness is due to the Sverdrupian omission of vertical processes in the ocean; the ITF has been shown to modify the thermal structure of the tropical Pacific, in particular the thermocline depth, which has subsequent influence on tropical winds. Another omitted aspect is that the tropical Pacific is highly baroclinic, with opposing currents at different levels whose dynamics can be obscured in a vertical integration. These processes cannot be represented by the simple dynamics of the Island Rule.

Third, equation (9) implicitly assumes that the west side of an island, and the passageways at its north and south tips, are "far enough" away from other land masses that they can be considered independent. That appears clearly correct for New Zealand, New Caledonia and Madagascar, but is questionable for flow around islands such as Japan, the Caribbean islands, Taiwan (where the issues include the shallowness of the Taiwan Strait), the 140km-wide strait between the Solomon Islands and New Britain, and certainly for the Indonesian Throughflow. Various researchers have added modifications to the Island Rule dynamics to overcome these limitations, with some success. Formulations for bottom topography, including the shallow sills of the ITF, the possibility of interaction with the many islands in its channel were implemented in a revised Rule, and an ingenious electrical circuit analogy was proposed for the multiple straits of ITF acting in series and in parallel.

Godfrey's unorthodox formulation of the problem in terms of pressure may have hampered acceptance of his ideas, since ocean circulation theorists typically were accustomed to thinking about forced motion as vorticity balances (but see Sverdrup balance#Interpretation and note the fundamental role of the wind stress curl – i.e., vorticity forcing – throughout Godfrey's derivation). Several papers re-derived and interpreted the Island Rule in more familiar vorticity terms, while calling Godfrey's result "surprisingly robust". Although concluding that estimates of Island Rule transport compared well with observations and both idealized and more realistic numerical models, several factors were identified including details of those mentioned above, focusing on effects of the island shape, dissipation of vorticity, bottom topography, the role of friction at the north and south points of the island, and specifying the factors that determine whether an island can be truly considered independent.
