= Mindanao Eddy =

Semi-permanent cold-ring ocean eddy near the Philippines

The Mindanao Eddy (7°N, 128°E) is a semi-permanent cold-ring eddy formed in the retroflection area of the Mindanao Current. The Mindanao Eddy is bordered to the north by the North Equatorial Current and to the south by the North Equatorial Counter Current. The eddy has a diameter of 250 km and a cyclonic circulation. The Mindanao Eddy has been identified as potential grounds for fisheries due to upwelling.

== Additional sources ==
- Kashino, Yuji; Atmadipoera, Agus; Kuroda, Yoshifumi; Lukijanto (5 December 2003). "Observed features of the Halmahera and Mindanao Eddies". Journal of Geophysical Research: Oceans. 118 (12): 6543–6560. doi:10.1002/2013JC009207.
