= Mindanao Current =

Narrow, southward-flowing ocean current along the southeastern coast of the Philippines

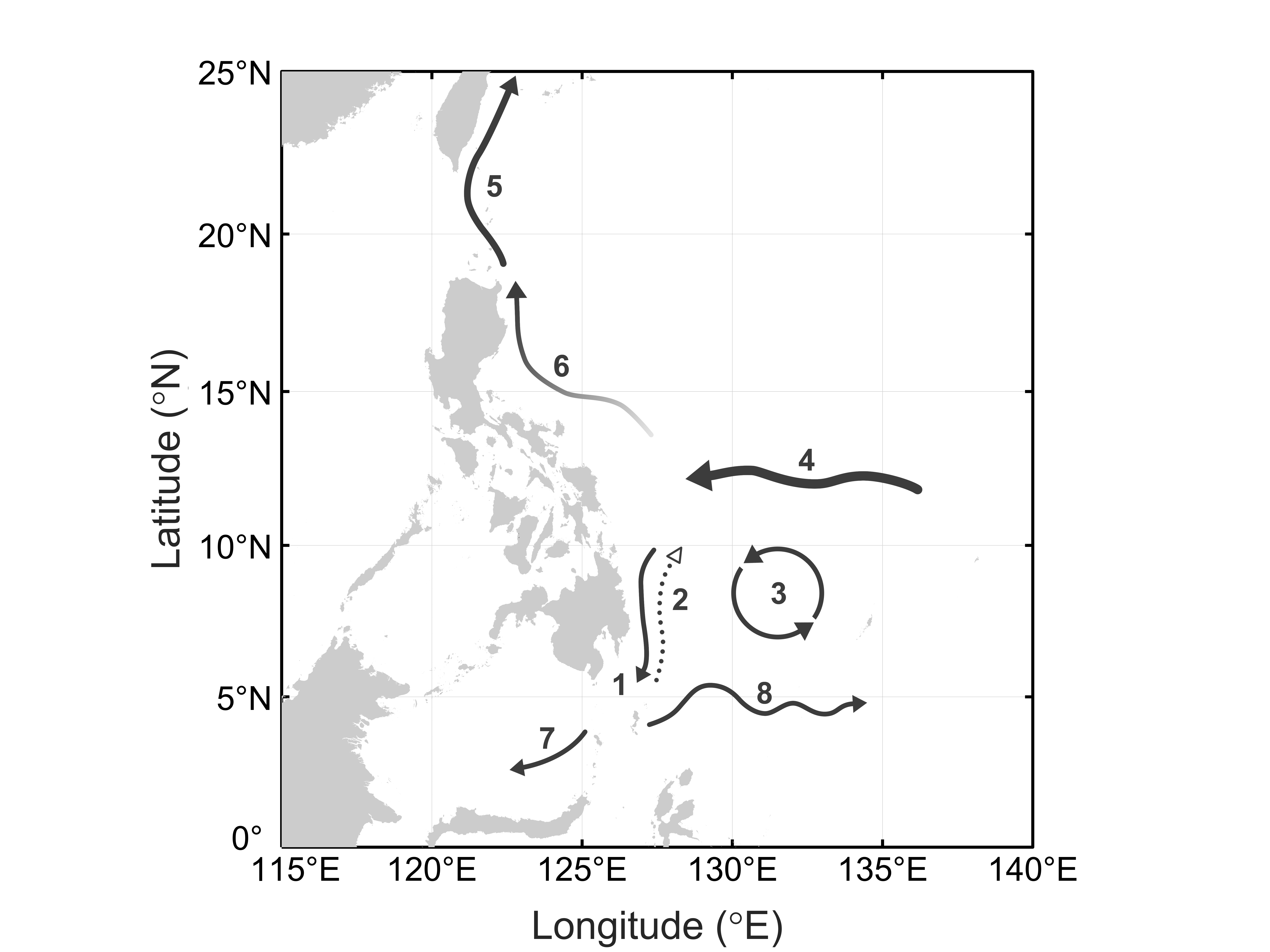
The ocean currents surrounding the Philippines: (1) Mindanao Current, (2) Mindanao Undercurrent (dotted to indicate that it is deeper than the other currents shown), (3) Mindanao Eddy, (4) North Equatorial Current, (5) Kuroshio current, (6) the beginnings and feeder currents of the Kuroshio (gradated to indicate that it strengthens to the North), (7) Indonesian Throughflow, and (8) North Equatorial Countercurrent

The Mindanao Current (MC) is a southward current in the western Pacific Ocean that transports mass and freshwater between ocean basins. It is a low-latitude western boundary current that follows the eastern coast of the Philippine island group and its namesake, Mindanao. The MC forms from the North Equatorial Current (NEC) that flows from east to west between 10 and 20°N. As it travels west, the NEC reaches its western limit: the coast of the Philippines. Once it encounters shallower waters near land, it “splits” into two branches: one moves northward and becomes the Kuroshio current and one moves southward and becomes the Mindanao Current. The process of splitting is called a bifurcation.

The Mindanao Current flows towards the equator and is most intense near the surface, reaching maximum speeds of $1.3$ $ms^{-1}$. It can be observed until depths of $1000$ $m$ near the Philippine coast and extends until $350$ $km$ offshore. The MC transports climatic signals and in doing so, influences the regional climate and the El Niño-Southern Oscillation (ENSO). Overall, the Mindanao Current is critical in the circulation within the whole Pacific basin. However, in comparison with other boundary currents in the North Pacific, the Mindanao Current has received limited attention and therefore little is known about it.

== Physical Properties ==
The Mindanao Current is a low-latitude western boundary current located in the North Pacific and formed at the Philippine Sea by the bifurcation of the NEC. The jet transports approximately $13-39$ Sv (where $1$ $Sv=10^6m^3s^{-1}$) to the equator. It flows alongside the contours of the Philippine coast, approximately following the mean dynamic bathymetry based on underwater glider observations. The MC feeds the equatorial currents, including the North Equatorial Countercurrent and the Indonesian Throughflow which transports water from the Pacific to the Indian Ocean. Thus, the Mindanao Current serves a role in the global overturning circulation. It often interacts with the nearby Mindanao Eddy which is a semi-permanent cyclonic recirculation to the east. Beneath the Mindanao Current is an even less studied undercurrent, the Mindanao Undercurrent (MUC), which is deeper than $400$ $m$ and lies offshore of the MC. Both the MC and its undercurrent are pathways for the exchange of water in the tropical Pacific.

Identified by its salinity signature, the MC waters from the surface to $200$ $m$ depth are North Pacific Tropical Water (NPTW) while the layer at $300-500$ $m$ depth is North Pacific Intermediate water (NPIW). The NPTW is characterized by a salinity maximum of $35$ $psu$ or Practical Salinity Units which is relatively high. As the water mass is advected southward by the MC, it evolves: the salinity maximum decays by $0.1$ $psu$ along the Philippine coast. Once it reaches a latitude of 6°N, it becomes indiscernible. In contrast, the waters of the MUC transport Antarctic Intermediate Water which originates from the south Pacific. It is characterized by a salinity greater than $34.5$ $psu$ and usually contains more oxygen than the NPIW.

The MC originates from the southern branch of the NEC bifurcation. Its northern branch becomes the Kuroshio current which begins as a weak and variable current that strengthens at the Luzon Strait. The Kuroshio must travel a larger distance to gain speed than the Mindanao Current which is strong closer to the bifurcation location. It is fed by the southern portion of the NEC.

The NEC is a wide current, spanning approximately 10-20°N. Towards 10°N, it is relatively shallow while towards 20°N, it deepens significantly (in the order of $100$ $m$). As a consequence, the bifurcation location is northward with increasing depth, i.e., at the shallowest layer ($0-100$ $m$), the bifurcation occurs at ~12°N; at $100-300$ $m$, it occurs at ~13°N; at depths of $300-600$ $m$, it occurs at ~ 15°N. Thus, the origin of the Mindanao Current is more northern with depth.

Observations from December 2010 to August 2014 show that the surface MC (specifically $50-150$ $m$ depth) varies from season to season. It is stronger during boreal or Northern Hemisphere spring and weaker during fall. From $150-400$ $m$, it is stronger in spring and fall and weaker in summer and winter. Seasonal variations in the MC are controlled by large-scale upper ocean circulation. The variations are often explained by local wind forcing of the western Pacific, both by local winds and winds in the Pacific's interior which cause westward propagating Rossby waves.

=== Predicted effects of climate change ===
Under the influence of climate change, models predict that western boundary currents will be affected in different ways. For the Mindanao Current in particular, numerous simulations have agreed that the current will decrease in strength. It is projected to decrease by a magnitude of $2.3-5.6$ $Sv$ along with the Indonesian Throughflow which it supplies. Although the total transport will probably weaken, most of the weakening is subsurface and it will intensify above 100 m south of 7°S, which suggests that the MC will be shallower.

=== Relationship with the El Niño-Southern Oscillation ===
Climate affects the circulation of the western Pacific and on the yearly timescale, ENSO is a major driver. The MC is stronger in the developing stages of the El Niño and weaker during the decaying stage, although with a lot of uncertainty. These variations are probably due to the wind, but the specific mechanism varies with latitude. Profiles of the water column show that the surface salinity is highest during the 2010/11 El Niño and freshest at the end of the 2010/11 La Niña.

== Research initiatives focused on the current ==
The Mindanao Current is difficult to observe and model because of the strength of the current, the extreme topography of the region, and complicating factors such as wind stress fluctuations and eddies. The most extensive observations of the Mindanao Current were performed during the following research programs:

- The Western Equatorial Pacific Circulation Study (1985–1986)
- Tropical Ocean Global Atmosphere (1985–1994)
- Northwestern Pacific Ocean Circulation and Climate Experiment (2004–2015)
- South Pacific Ocean Circulation and Climate Experiment (Since 2005)
- Origins of the Kuroshio and Mindanao Current initiative (2009–2014)

== See also ==
- Ocean current
- Oceanic gyres
- Physical oceanography
