= Somali Current =

Boundary current in the Indian Ocean

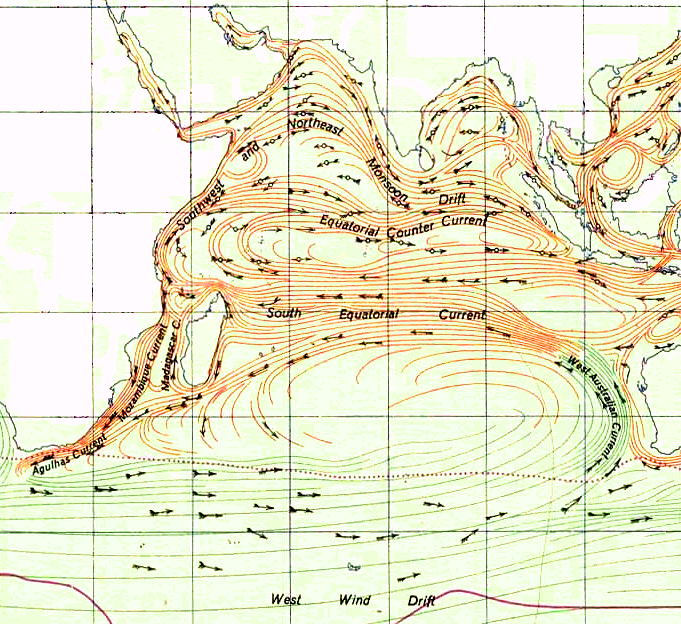
The Somali Current off the Somali coast in the context of the Indian Ocean Gyre during (northern) summer. The circular current east of the Horn of Africa is known as the Great Whirl

The Somali Current is a cold ocean boundary current that runs along the coast of Somalia and Oman in the Western Indian Ocean and is analogous to the Gulf Stream in the Atlantic Ocean. This current is heavily influenced by the monsoons and is the only major upwelling system that occurs on a western boundary of an ocean. The water that is upwelled by the current merges with another upwelling system, creating one of the most productive ecosystems in the ocean.

The Somali current is characterized by seasonal changes influenced by the Southwest monsoon and the Northeast Monsoon. During the months of June to September, the warm Southwest monsoon moves the coastal waters northeastward, creating coastal upwelling. The upwelled water is carried offshore by Ekman transport and merges with water that was brought to the surface by open-ocean upwelling. The Somali Jet, a.k.a. the Findlater Jet, a narrow low-level, atmospheric jet, also develops during the Southwest monsoon, and blows diagonally across the Indian Ocean, parallel to the coasts of Somalia and Oman. As a result, an Ekman transport is created to the right of the wind. At the center of the jet, the transport is maximum and decreases to the right and left with increasing distance. To the left of the jet center, there is less water movement toward the center than is leaving, creating a divergence in the upper layer and resulting in an upwelling event (Ekman suction). In contrast, to the right of the center of the jet, more water is coming from the center than is leaving, creating a downwelling event (Ekman pumping). This open-ocean upwelling in combination with the coastal upwelling causes a massive upwelling.

== History ==
The history of physical oceanographic approaches to the Somali current has begun from the mid-1960s with serious interests. From the mid-1960s until the late 1970s several magnificent theoretical studies had been proposed and gave physical answers of the current behaviors and formations. After the late 1970s, the physics of the Somali current enhanced by ocean data analyses with outstanding field measurements of the current properties. The research footprints during the early 1960s to the late 1970s are presented as below.

(early research histories before 1981)

1966 Warren et al. : Oceanographers and Meteorologists agreed the existence of the Somali current and its behaviors, but its exact processes and involved nature sources had not been clearly understood.

1969 Lighthill : the source of the Somali current is mass flux deposited by baroclinic and barotropic waves in the western boundary region.

1970 Düing : presented the presence of alternative cyclonic and anti-cyclonic gyre, the Indian Ocean Gyres. Found eddy size of the Indian Ocean Gyres are much larger than the gyres of the other mid-latitude western boundary currents (the Indian Ocean Gyres ~ 300-500 nmi > the Gulf Stream / Kuroshio ~ 50 – 100 nmi)

1971 Düing & Szekelda : the baroclinic mode is the dominant mode of the Somali current

1972,1973 Leetma : local winds are crucial to the onset of the Somali Current.

1975 Colborn : climatological analysis of the entire Indian Ocean from bathythermograph and hydrocast observations

1976 Hurlburt & Thompson : Characterize the Somali current as a time-dependent, baroclinic, inertial boundary current.

1976 Bruce : time-series analyses, XBT cross-section measurement by the EXXON tankers

1979 USNS WILKES : the Great Whirl (Prime Eddy) and the Socotra Eddy together with the strong shear zone along the eastern edge of the Great Whirl were observed during late August and early September 1979.

== Properties ==
The Somali Current is rapid response, shallow and shifts its direction seasonally. Especially from 5°N and southward, the Somali current is extremely shallow (under 150m depth southward flow all year through). Further north, the jet deepens somewhat, reaching the permanent thermocline. The structure of the current around the equator is extremely complex and similarly layered to the equatorial flows, though the Somali Current is oriented north-southward instead of east-westward.

The typical water volume transported by the Somali Current amounts to 37 ± 5 Sv (0.037 ± 5 km^{3}/s) during mid-September, making the current circulation generally weaker than other mid-latitude western boundary currents (such as the Gulf Stream, the Kuroshio current). However, volume transport maxima as high as 60-70 Sv (comparable to the Gulf Stream) have been measured around the south of Socotra Island.

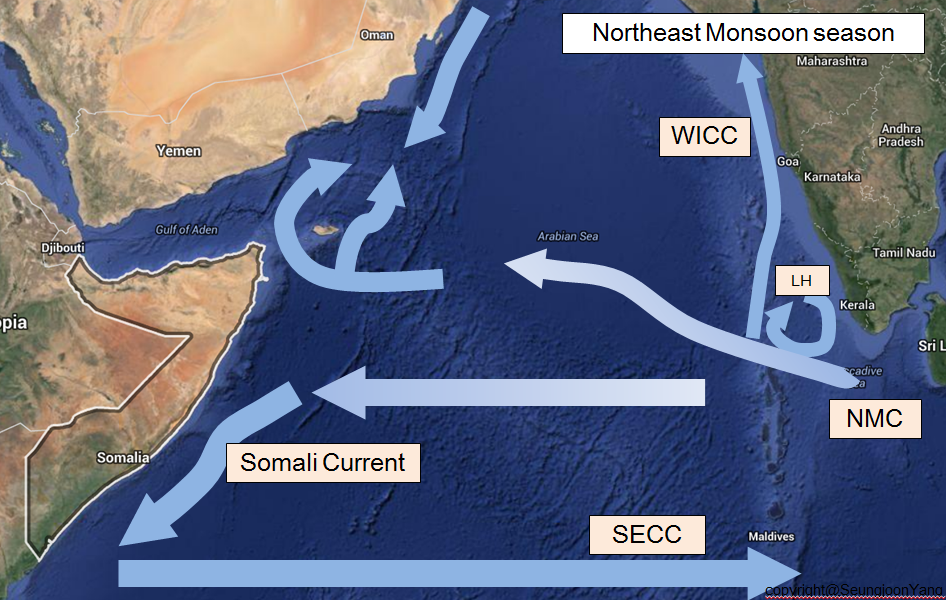
Southward Somali Current during Northeast Indian Monsoon

The Somali Current reaches speeds of up to 7 knots during the summer months weakening and eventually reversing direction during the winter.

== Formation and behavior ==
The Somali Current is driven principally by the seasonal monsoon winds. In (Northern) summer (May – September) the southwest monsoon blows along the east coast of Africa and Oman. During the fall it reverses its direction to become a northeasterly wind during (Northern) winter.

Before the onset of the monsoon (March–May): During this season, shallow northward coastal current flows with 50–100 km width near the Somali coast, overlying a southward undercurrent. By alongshore winds, upwelling current flows to the coast. Near the equator, the East African Coast Current (EACC) flows northward across the equator. The southern Somali Current flows northward as an extension of the EACC from south to the 3-4°N.

Northeastward current (Jun-Sep, Summer Monsoon): The Somali Current begins developing its strength from mid-May with the summer monsoon onset, and current velocities rapidly grow to the maximum until June and September with the southwest monsoon blowing. During this season, the current direction is northeastward, and the velocity in mid-May is about 2.0 m/s and in June, 3.5 m/s and more. Typically the Somali Current will move about 1500 km to the northeast and, near Cape Guardafui (at 6~10°N), change its direction to the east to merge with the Indian Monsoon current.

According to the works of Friedrich A. Schott and Julian P. McCreary Jr., the Northeastward Somali current has the following two sub-season periods. During June–July, the Great Whirl grows at 4-10°N, and a cold wedge shape water mass develops to the offshore at latitude 10-12°N. The size and strength of the Great Whirl during the summer monsoon is measured as 10 cm/s velocity at about 1000 m depth, while some visible gyre structure is observed at further depth. The upper layer Somali Current flows northwards along the East African coast, and finally enters the Gulf of Aden between the Socotra Archipelago and the Horn of Africa. The mean flow velocity of this outgoing current is about 5 Sv.

The period between August and September is the late phase of the summer monsoon. During this period, the Great Whirl almost forms a closed circulation, and strong upwelling streams (colder than 17 °C, typical upwelling water temperature ~ 19-23 °C) develop near the Northern Somali coast.

After the summer monsoon recedes (Oct-Nov): During this period, the southwest monsoon winds continually weaken, so the Northward Somali Current (extension flow of the EACC) no longer crosses the equator, turning instead to the east at around 3°N. However, the Great Whirl still remains.

Southwestward current (Dec-Feb, Winter Monsoon): During the fall (Sep-Nov), with the strengthening northeast monsoon influencing it, the Somali Current gradually becomes weaker and slower. Finally, in early December, beginning south of 5°N and expanding rapidly to 10°N by January, the current reverses its direction, now flowing southwardly (velocities of 0.7 – 1.0 m/s). The Somali Current flows to the south throughout (Northern) Winter (Dec-Feb), constrained to the region south of 10°N, until in March, southward flow recedes again to 4°N to be reversed in April.

During the winter monsoon, after crossing the equator, the southward Somali Current comes into confluence with the northward EACC and thereafter flows to the East.

Upwelling behavior: One of the unique characteristics of the Somali Current is the presence of strong coastal upwelling - the only major instance of this happening at a western ocean boundary. Following Ekman transport and with the southwest monsoon blowing parallel to the Somali coastline, the upwelling direction is to the offshore during the summer: The warm and salty Somali Current flows northward across the equator to turn to the East near Cape Guardafui. This flow deflection causes strong upwelling along the Somali coast, lowering coastal temperatures by 5 °C or more from May through September.

During the winter season, the northeast monsoon reverses the northward Somali Coastal Current, shutting down coastal upwelling.

Somali Undercurrent: April – early June; A southward undercurrent develops underneath the northward surface current (depth 100-300m, monthly average velocity 20 cm/s, maximum 60 cm/s), stretching to the near 4°N and turning offshore. It is eventually terminated by the establishment of the deep–reaching Great Whirl. Fall – Winter; Similarly, a southward undercurrent develops underneath the northward surface current between 8 and 12°N.

Winter; A northward cross-equatorial undercurrent (depth 150-400m) flows underneath the southward surface Somali Current, with their flows balancing. Because of this undercurrent, near the equator, the surface (southward) Somali Current is extremely shallow (less than 150m).

== Great Whirl ==
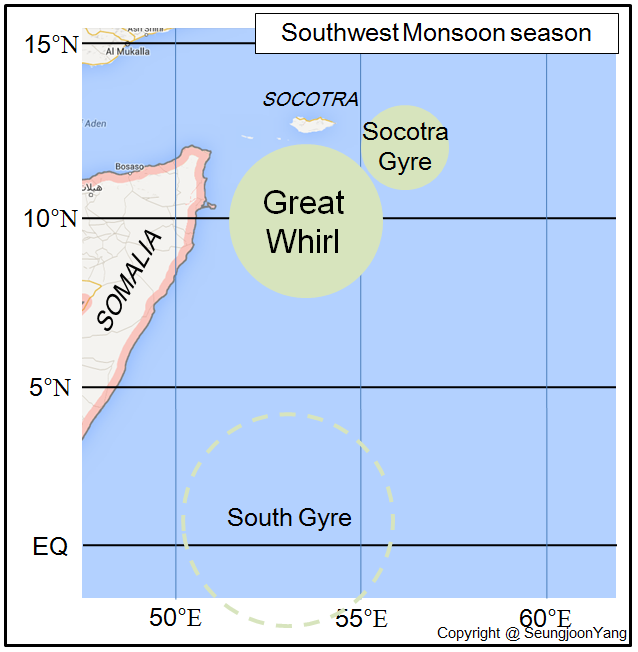
Two gigantic eddies at the north west Indian Ocean during Southwest Monsoon

The Great Whirl is a huge anti-cyclonic eddy generated by the Somali current flowing in (northern) summer, and one of the two gigantic Indian Ocean Gyres (the other is the Socotra Gyre). The Great Whirl can be observed between 5-10°N and 52-57°E off the Somali coast in the summer season, a location typically around 200 km southwest of the Socotra Gyre (between June and September). However, in the past both the Great Whirl and the Socotra Gyre have been known to occasionally collapse, and their exact locations differ from year to year. The Great Whirl's typical size is 400–600 km in horizontal diameter, and typical surface current velocity is 1.5-2.0 m/s.

How the Great Whirl forms exactly isn't yet fully understood, but the analytical approach of applying Rossby wave theory can explain its basic formation mechanism. By observation and analysis of [Schott and Quadfasel (1982)], the summer monsoon develops suddenly during June–July, and drives westward water flow in the location. Schott and Quadfasel applied first-mode Rossby waves to the water flows, and concluded that "the formation of the Great Whirl is a response to the very strong anti-cyclonic wind-stress curl".

Since the Somali current changes seasonally, the Great Whirl also displays seasonal behaviour in keeping with the monsoon cycle. The eddy is usually evident between June and September, however e.g. in 1995, the Somali Current did not develop in June at all, so that during that time the eddy was severely weakened and of very small size - a prolonged onset phase. As the Somali Current developed through the summer, it was only in September that the Great Whirl finally maximized and began to disperse, entering the winter season (the wane). Conversely, the Great Whirl may also continue to exist until mid-October, still exhibiting large size and its curl structure may remain evident even longer, underneath the winter Somali Current.

This seasonal behaviour of the Great Whirl affects the local coastal ocean flows and thus the Arabian Sea ecosystem: During the summer season, coastal upwelling currents strongly dependent on the shape and behaviour of the eddy are observed to the northwest of the Great Whirl. Not only does the biological productivity of the region depend on these upwelling currents, they (and thus, the Great Whirl itself) also play a large part in regulating the heat flux budget of the North Indian Ocean.

== Effect on marine ecosystem ==
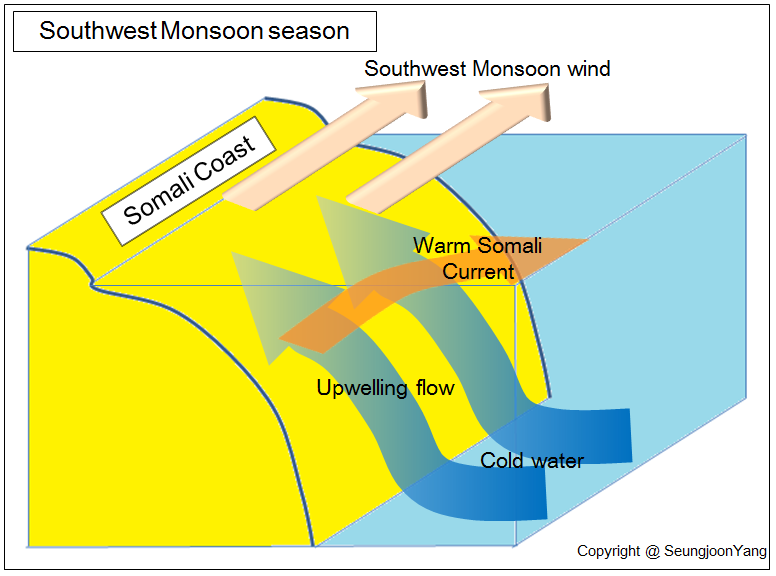
Upwelling current at the Somali coast during Southwest Monsoon

The offshore Somali coastal area is one of the most productive marine ecosystems in the world. Especially during the southwest Indian monsoon, strong upwelling pumps cold (17-22 °C) and highly nutrient rich (about 5 to 20 μm of nitrate) subsurface water to the coastal region. During this season, mean phytoplankton density and productivity is further boosted by the activities of the offshore eddy, the Great Whirl. Total zooplankton biomass consists of about 25% Euphausids, the rest being Copepods (dominant zooplankton species in the region ~ Calanoides carinatus and Eucalanus elongates). However, the fast-moving Somali Current reduces the residence time of the upwelled nutrient-rich water, thus limiting biological productivity in this region somewhat. A major part of this unutilized nutrient is transported to the southern Arabian Sea, supporting biological production there. Furthermore, the high wind speeds (approximately 15 m/s) of the Southwest monsoon affecting the Somali Current induce intense vertical mixing, increasing the thickness of the mixed layer as well as overall surface nutrient enrichment leading to high productivity. After this season, with the onset of the Northeast (Winter) Monsoon, primary productivity decreases, though zooplankton density does so only slightly.

== See also ==
- Ocean current
- Oceanic gyres
- Physical oceanography
