= Sverdrup balance =

Theoretical relationship in oceanography

The Sverdrup balance, or Sverdrup relation, is a theoretical relationship between the wind stress exerted on the surface of the open ocean and the vertically integrated meridional (north-south) transport of ocean water.

== History ==
Aside from the oscillatory motions associated with tidal flow, there are two primary causes of large scale flow in the ocean: (1) thermohaline processes, which induce motion by introducing changes at the surface in temperature and salinity, and therefore in seawater density, and (2) wind forcing. In the 1940s, when Harald Sverdrup was thinking about the physical processes determining the gross features of ocean circulation, he chose to focus on the wind stress component of the forcing. As he says in his 1947 paper, in which he presented the Sverdrup relation, this is probably the more important of the two.

Sverdrup was motivated by what had been a long-standing mystery of ocean circulation: While most of the major ocean surface currents flow downwind, the equatorial Atlantic and Pacific Oceans both feature a strong and persistent Equatorial Counter Current that flows east against the prevailing trade winds, a few degrees north of the equator. He wrote “Our specific problem is to determine whether the equatorial currents, including the counter currents, can be accounted for on the basis of our knowledge of the wind stress only".

== Derivation ==
Sverdrup made simplifying assumptions by neglecting friction (except that of the wind stress on the ocean surface), time variability (thus the balance represents the mean state), and the advective (nonlinear) terms of the Navier-Stokes equations, and by considering only the top-to-bottom vertically integrated currents in a flat-bottomed ocean. These are consequential restrictions that remove - in addition to thermohaline influences - many factors affecting ocean circulation, including mixing, boundary currents, and the ability to portray the vertical structure, but nevertheless reproduce in broad strokes the large-scale features of the currents.

With Sverdrup's simplifying assumptions, the resulting barotropic momentum equations become

$$\begin{aligned}
-f V &= -P_x + {\tau^x} \\
f U &= -P_y + {\tau^y}
\end{aligned}$$

with the continuity equation

$U_x + V_y = 0$ ,

where upper-case variables are vertically integrated, $f$ is the Coriolis parameter, $U$ and $V$ are the eastward and northward transport components (in units of m^{2}/s), $P$ is the (integrated) pressure, $\tau$ is the wind stress (direction indicated by superscripts $x,y$), subscripts indicate derivatives. For simplicity of notation, both $P$ and $\tau$ are understood to be divided by the background density of seawater $\rho_0$, thus the units of $P_{x,y}$ and $\tau$ are m^{2}/s^{2}. Sverdrup's top-to-bottom vertical integration in steady state leads to the simplified (non-divergent) continuity equation.

The simplified momentum equations can be expressed as sums of the well-known geostrophic and Ekman flow types: $(U,V)=(U,V)_{geostrophic}+(U,V)_{Ekman}$.

Sverdrup’s analysis proceeded with the crucial first step of taking the Curl of the momentum equations ($\partial/\partial y$ of the first minus $\partial/\partial x$ of the second), using $\beta = \partial f /\partial y$ to define the variation of the Coriolis parameter with latitude ($\beta$ is approximated as a constant). Then use continuity to remove the $(U_x+V_y)$ term.

The result is the Sverdrup balance defining the meridional transport entirely in terms of the wind: $\beta V = Curl(\tau)$ .

Continuity then gives the corresponding zonal transport:

$U_x = -V_y = -\frac{1}{\beta} \frac{\partial}{\partial y} Curl(\tau) \Longrightarrow U = -\frac{1}{\beta} \int_{x_e}^x \frac{\partial}{\partial y} Curl(\tau) dx$ ,

where $x_e$ is the eastern boundary of the ocean.

Since the vertically-integrated fluid is horizontally non-divergent, a streamfunction $\psi$ exists:

$\psi = \frac{1}{\beta} \int_{x_e}^x Curl(\tau) dx$ , where $V = \psi_x$ , $U = -\psi_y$ , $\psi(x_e) = 0$.

Because flow is along streamfunction contours, it is a convenient way to display the resulting circulation (first figure below).

== Interpretation ==
Taking the Curl of the momentum equations in this way has several advantages:

- In practical terms it removes the pressure gradient terms. These require ocean observations that are hard to measure accurately or sample adequately.
- The balance has $\beta$ but no $f$, thus continuous solutions are available across the equator.
- Unlike the momentum equations, the Sverdrupian expression for $\psi$ produces a clear and simple eastern boundary condition: $\psi(x=x_e)=0$ expresses the obvious fact that there can be no flow through the eastern boundary, so the coast is a streamline. Integrating the curl westward from the coast depicts a circulation derived from the wind alone.
- A vorticity equation describes what the wind does to the ocean on the large scale: stretching and squashing a column of water and thereby changing its spin.

The last of these is an example of conservation of potential vorticity in Rossby’s shallow water formulation, in which the local and planetary rotations balance in steady state. A parcel at rest with respect to the surface of the earth must match the spin of the earth underneath it. Looking down on the earth at the north pole, this planetary spin is counterclockwise, which is defined as positive rotation or vorticity. At the south pole it is clockwise, corresponding to negative rotation. Thus, for example, to move a parcel of fluid northward without causing it to gain local spin, it must acquire sufficient (positive) rotation so as to keep it matched with the rotation of the earth underneath it. The left-hand side of the Sverdrup equation represents the meridional motion required to maintain this match between the absolute vorticity of a water column and the planetary vorticity, while the right represents the applied rotational force of the wind.

== Illustrations of the Sverdrup Circulation in the North Pacific ==
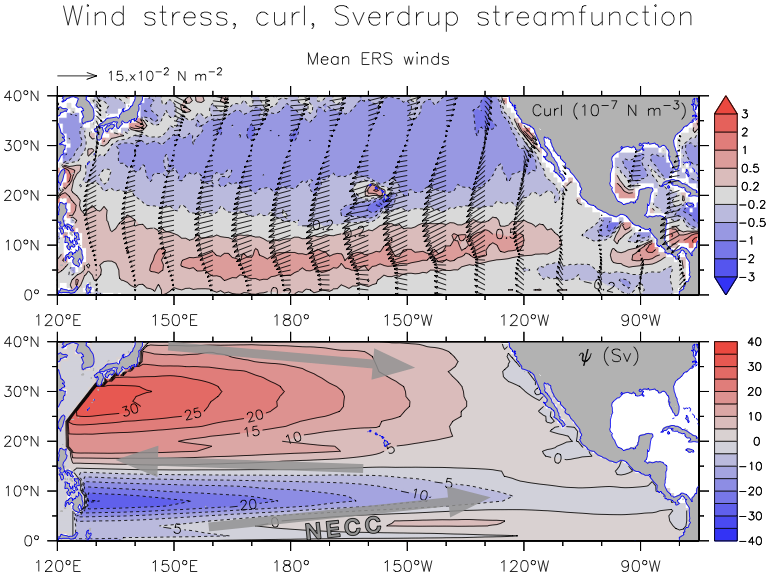
Top: ERS (scatterometer) winds; bottom Sverdrup_streamfunction. These figures are expanded views of fields used to show the circulation west of Central America.

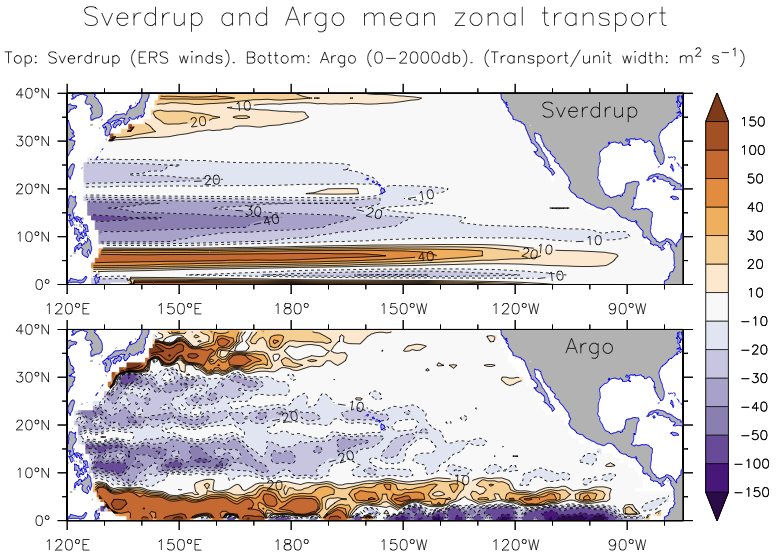
Zonal currents in the N Pacific: (top) Sverdrup U from wind only, (bottom) Observed geostrophic U from Argo profiling floats.

Sverdrup made his calculation of the wind, curl and zonal current using the very limited observational data available at that time. These illustrations show examples of the calculations described above from modern satellite wind stress (vectors; scale at top left) and its curl (shading, in units of 10^{−7}N m^{−3}, top panel) from the European Remote-Sensing Satellite ERS-1 and 2 Scatterometers on a 1 degree grid, averaged over 1991-2000, distributed by EUMETSAT. These winds, their curl, and the resulting Sverdrup streamfunction are frequently used to illustrate the circulation. Most of the curl is due to $\partial \tau^x / \partial y$. The blue shading of the subtropical gyre (north of about 15°N) reflects negative rotation due to the change from westerly (from the west) winds in mid-latitudes to easterly trade winds in the subtropics. The region of positive curl (red) along about 7°N is where easterly winds decrease towards the equator; this feature of the wind produces the North Equatorial Counter Current (NECC) that was Sverdrup’s target. The resulting Sverdrup streamfunction in the bottom panel shows the circulation produced by this wind pattern: Flow is along streamfunction contours (emphasized by overlaid gray arrows, with the NECC labeled).

The lower figure compares the zonal currents represented by the Sverdrup streamfunction shown above to observed currents: orange indicates eastward flow, blue westward. The top panel is calculated from the wind alone via the Sverdrup balance; eastward flow (orange) along the north edge, and westward across the central gyre (blue), are shown. The NECC is the orange band along 5°-10°N. The bottom panel shows observed geostrophic currents calculated from ocean observations (Argo float density); which has a similar pattern, indicating that the Sverdrup balance captures these features. The Sverdrupian representation is smoother than the observed currents but has the same structure and magnitude (but see Weaknesses below), in particular showing the eastward NECC flowing east against the wind and convincingly explaining the longstanding mystery that motivated Sverdrup.

== Weaknesses of the Sverdrup formulation ==
The Sverdrup circulation is repeatedly found to be a robust representation of the vertically-integrated steady ocean transports away from the coastlines of low and mid-latitude oceans. Weaknesses of this approach are found most prominently in the Southern Ocean, where the lack of a meridional barrier precludes integration from a known eastern boundary condition. The narrow, intense western boundary currents are explicitly excluded by the neglect of friction in the Sverdrup formulation, so the westward integration that defines the streamfunction is valid only east of a narrow western boundary layer. These strong currents fundamentally depend on friction of some kind, either with the bottom (in Stommel’s simple calculation), or with the western coastline (Munk, Godfrey). (See Further Developments below). Physically, this dependence occurs because the integration of wind curl forcing can accumulate vorticity that grows to the west (e.g., anti-cyclonic vorticity in the subtropical gyres) that must be dissipated to allow a closed circulation.

Regions where strong eddy activity is important to the dynamics are similarly out of its scope; these include the Southern Ocean, the exit regions where the western boundary currents turn offshore (note the large magnitude mismatch between Sverdrup and observed currents along 35°N east of Japan where the Kuroshio Current leaves the coast; see Examples above), and eddies in several regions produced by shear between adjacent horizontal currents. Sverdrup's simplifying choice to restrict attention to the vertically-integrated circulation means that the balance cannot describe details of vertical flows, for example the upwelling commonly found along the west coasts of North and South America, or equatorial upwelling.

== Further developments ==
In 1948 Henry Stommel proposed a way around the inability to describe western boundary currents in the Sverdrup formulation, starting with the same equations as Sverdrup but adding bottom friction. This showed that the variation in the Coriolis parameter with latitude results in a narrow western boundary current in ocean basins. In 1950, Walter Munk combined the results of Rossby (eddy viscosity ), Sverdrup (upper ocean wind driven flow), and Stommel (western boundary current flow), and proposed a complete solution for the ocean circulation.

There remained the problem of islands, since none of these solutions explained how the westward integration could be restarted if interrupted by an island. This is a particularly important problem due to the position of Australia between the Pacific and Indian Oceans, and meant that no Sverdrupian solution for the Indian Ocean circulation was available. In 1989, roughly 40 years after the earlier studies, Stuart Godfrey of CSIRO Marine and Atmospheric Research developed a methodology of comparable simplicity known as the “Island Rule” to explain how the effects of a Sverdrup circulation to the east could be communicated to the west side of the “island”, and the westward integration could be continued. This enabled the Sverdrup streamfunction to be extended across the Indian Ocean, connecting the wind-driven circulation across both basins in what has been called the "Southern Hemisphere Super Gyre". Other significant islands where the Godfrey method is needed include Madagascar and several of the larger and mountainous South Pacific islands (New Zealand, Fiji, Vanuatu, New Caledonia and the Solomon Island chain).

== See also ==
- Atlantic meridional overturning circulation
