= North Brazil Current =

North Atlantic ocean current

The North Brazil Current (NBC) is a warm water ocean current that is part of the southwestern North Atlantic Gyre. It begins when the westward moving Atlantic South Equatorial Current splits in half and flows northwestward, following the coastline of north Brazil. It ends at the border of Brazil and Guiana, where it is renamed the Guiana Current. It is predominantly a salt water current, but it does help transport fresh water from the Amazon River northward.

== Track ==
The current begins around 10°S and 31°W, where the split of the South Equatorial Current becomes apparent. The split is forced once the continental shelf begins, and happens quite abruptly. At this point, the current moves quite quickly at 21-23 Sv. Around 5°S, it merges with a northern branch of the South Equatorial Current (SEC) and increases its volume to 37 Sv, with its peak between 100m and 200m deep. Here, the current is at its maximum extent of about 300 kilometers wide. The current continues to about 7°N and 52°W, where it becomes the Guiana Current.

== Characteristics ==
The general speed of the current is between 60 and 100 centimeters per second. A peak recorded speed of 110 centimeters per second was recorded about 100 m below the surface of the ocean, in the vicinity of where the NBC merges with the SEC. Average temperatures are in the range of 22 °C to 28.5 °C, and tend to be warmest during the northern hemisphere's summer.

The strength of the current is dependent on the season. During the northern hemisphere's spring, there is a minimum of 13 Sv in the current, which jumps to 36 Sv as the easterlies strengthen. The average is about 26 Sv for the whole year.

The average salinity of the current occurs at about 5°S, where the more saline SEC merges with the NBC. Both are quite warm, so the densities are similar, and the currents mix and create water with a salinity of 37.1 psu. The salinity will then decrease to around 36.5 psu as the current moves northward toward the equator and into the presence of the Intertropical Convergence Zone (ITCZ). The rainfall produced at the ITCZ works to dilute the salt content of the water.

The depth of the NBC is dependent on the depth of the thermocline, as well as the depth of the continental shelf. Closer to the shore, and especially where the depth of the water is less than 400 m, the sea floor acts as the lower limit to the current. If the depth is greater than 400 meters, the thermocline acts as the lower limit, and represents the boundary of the NBC and the colder, eastward moving Atlantic North Equatorial Undercurrent (NEU). Since the NEU is colder than the NBC, they will have different densities and not mix, allowing each to flow past each other mostly uninhibited.

== North Brazil Current Rings ==
From July to February, it is quite common for the current to separate from the coast and curve back into itself. Since the current can be quite large, it is easy for large anticyclonic rings to generate, which separate from the main mass of the current and move northwestward with the prevailing winds. The mean diameter of the rings is about 300 kilometers, and move between 8 and 30 kilometers per day depending on the strength of the flow surrounding the ring. The rings are relatively shallow and move typically less than 1 Sv of water. The rings will eventually spin down after 100 days. Most rings make it to within the vicinity of the Caribbean Sea, and it is even possible for some to move into the lake, given that they are small enough to fit between the Lesser Antilles.

== See also ==
- Ocean current
- Oceanic gyres
- Physical oceanography
