= Boundary current =

Ocean current with dynamics determined by the presence of a coastline

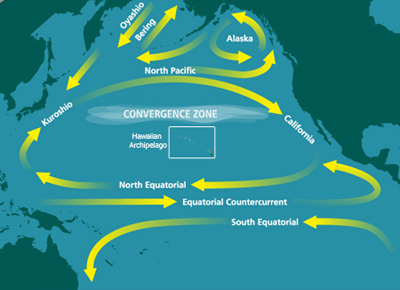
The main ocean currents involved with the North Pacific Gyre

Boundary currents are ocean currents with dynamics determined by the presence of a coastline, and fall into two distinct categories: western boundary currents and eastern boundary currents.

== Eastern boundary currents ==
Eastern boundary currents are relatively shallow, broad and slow-flowing. They are found on the eastern side of oceanic basins (adjacent to the western coasts of continents). Subtropical eastern boundary currents flow equatorward, transporting cold water from higher latitudes to lower latitudes; examples include the Benguela Current, the Canary Current, the Humboldt (Peru) Current, and the California Current. Coastal upwelling often brings nutrient-rich water into eastern boundary current regions, making them productive areas of the ocean.

== Western boundary currents ==
The world's largest ocean gyres

Western boundary currents may themselves be divided into sub-tropical or low-latitude western boundary currents. Sub-tropical western boundary currents are warm, deep, narrow, and fast-flowing currents that form on the west side of ocean basins due to western intensification. They carry warm water from the tropics poleward. Examples include the Gulf Stream, the Agulhas Current, and the Kuroshio Current. Low-latitude western boundary currents are similar to sub-tropical western boundary currents but carry cool water from the subtropics equatorward. Examples include the Mindanao Current and the North Brazil Current.

=== Western intensification ===
Western intensification applies to the western arm of an oceanic current, particularly a large gyre in such a basin. The trade winds blow westward in the tropics. The westerlies blow eastward at mid-latitudes. This applies a stress to the ocean surface with a curl in north and south hemispheres, causing Sverdrup transport equatorward (toward the tropics). Because of conservation of mass and of potential vorticity, that transport is balanced by a narrow, intense poleward current, which flows along the western coast, allowing the vorticity introduced by coastal friction to balance the vorticity input of the wind. The reverse effect applies to the polar gyres – the sign of the wind stress curl and the direction of the resulting currents are reversed. The principal west-side currents (such as the Gulf Stream of the North Atlantic Ocean) are stronger than those opposite (such as the California Current of the North Pacific Ocean). The mechanics were made clear by the American oceanographer Henry Stommel.

In 1948, Stommel published his key paper in Transactions, American Geophysical Union: "The Westward Intensification of Wind-Driven Ocean Currents", in which he used a simple, homogeneous, rectangular ocean model to examine the streamlines and surface height contours for an ocean at a non-rotating frame, an ocean characterized by a constant Coriolis parameter and finally, a real-case ocean basin with a latitudinally-varying Coriolis parameter. In this simple modeling the principal factors that were accounted for influencing the oceanic circulation were:

- surface wind stress
- bottom friction
- a variable surface height leading to horizontal pressure gradients
- the Coriolis effect.

In this, Stommel assumed an ocean of constant density and depth $D+h$ seeing ocean currents; he also introduced a linearized, frictional term to account for the dissipative effects that prevent the real ocean from accelerating. He starts, thus, from the steady-state momentum and continuity equations:

$f(D+h)v-F\cos \left(\frac{\pi y}{b}\right)-Ru-g(D+h)\frac{\partial h}{\partial x}=0\qquad (1)$

$\quad -f(D+h)u-Rv-g(D+h)\frac{\partial h}{\partial y}=0 \qquad \qquad (2)$

$\qquad \qquad \frac{\partial [(D+h)u]}{\partial x}+\frac{\partial [(D+h)v]}{\partial y}=0 \qquad \qquad \qquad (3)$

Here $f$ is the strength of the Coriolis force, $R$ is the bottom-friction coefficient, $g\,\,$ is gravity, and $-F\cos \left(\frac{\pi y}{b}\right)$ is the wind forcing. The wind is blowing towards the west at $y=0$ and towards the east at $y=b$.

Acting on (1) with $\frac{\partial}{\partial y}$ and on (2) with $\frac{\partial}{\partial x}$, subtracting, and then using (3), gives

$$v(D+h)\left(\frac{\partial f}{\partial y}\right)+\frac{\pi F}{b}\sin \left(\frac{\pi y}{b}\right)+R\left(\frac{\partial v}{\partial x}-\frac{\partial u}{\partial y}\right)=0 \quad (4)$$

If we introduce a Stream function $\psi$ and linearize by assuming that $D>>h$, equation (4) reduces to

$\nabla^2 \psi +\alpha\left(\frac{\partial \psi}{\partial x}\right)=\gamma \sin \left(\frac{\pi y}{b}\right)\qquad (5)$

Here

$\alpha=\left(\frac{D}{R}\right)\left (\frac{\partial f}{\partial y}\right)$

and

$\gamma=\frac{\pi F}{Rb}$

The solutions of (5) with boundary condition that $\psi$ be constant on the coastlines, and for different values of $\alpha$, emphasize the role of the variation of the Coriolis parameter with latitude in inciting the strengthening of western boundary currents. Such currents are observed to be much faster, deeper, narrower and warmer than their eastern counterparts.

For a non-rotating state (zero Coriolis parameter) and where that is a constant, ocean circulation has no preference toward intensification/acceleration near the western boundary. The streamlines exhibit a symmetric behavior in all directions, with the height contours demonstrating a nearly parallel relation to the streamlines, in a homogeneously rotating ocean. Finally, on a rotating sphere - the case where the Coriolis force is latitudinally variant, a distinct tendency for asymmetrical streamlines is found, with an intense clustering along the western coasts. Mathematically elegant figures within models of the distribution of streamlines and height contours in such an ocean if currents uniformly rotate can be found in the paper.

=== Sverdrup balance and physics of western intensification ===
The physics of western intensification can be understood through a mechanism that helps maintain the vortex balance along an ocean gyre. Harald Sverdrup was the first one, preceding Henry Stommel, to attempt to explain the mid-ocean vorticity balance by looking at the relationship between surface wind forcings and the mass transport within the upper ocean layer. He assumed a geostrophic interior flow, while neglecting any frictional or viscosity effects and presuming that the circulation vanishes at some depth in the ocean. This prohibited the application of his theory to the western boundary currents, since some form of dissipative effect (bottom Ekman layer) would be later shown to be necessary to predict a closed circulation for an entire ocean basin and to counteract the wind-driven flow.

Sverdrup introduced a potential vorticity argument to connect the net, interior flow of the oceans to the surface wind stress and the induced planetary vorticity perturbations. For instance, Ekman convergence in the sub-tropics (related to the existence of the trade winds in the tropics and the westerlies in the mid-latitudes) was suggested to lead to a downward vertical velocity and therefore, a squashing of the water columns, which subsequently forces the ocean gyre to spin more slowly (via angular momentum conservation). This is accomplished via a decrease in planetary vorticity (since relative vorticity variations are not significant in large ocean circulations), a phenomenon attainable through an equatorially directed, interior flow that characterizes the subtropical gyre. The opposite is applicable when Ekman divergence is induced, leading to Ekman suction) and a subsequent, water column stretching and poleward return flow, a characteristic of sub-polar gyres.

This return flow, as shown by Stommel, occurs in a meridional current, concentrated near the western boundary of an ocean basin. To balance the vorticity source induced by the wind stress forcing, Stommel introduced a linear frictional term in the Sverdrup equation, functioning as the vorticity sink. This bottom ocean, frictional drag on the horizontal flow allowed Stommel to theoretically predict a closed, basin-wide circulation, while demonstrating the west-ward intensification of wind-driven gyres and its attribution to the Coriolis variation with latitude (beta effect). Walter Munk (1950) further implemented Stommel's theory of western intensification by using a more realistic frictional term, while emphasizing "the lateral dissipation of eddy energy". In this way, not only did he reproduce Stommel's results, recreating thus the circulation of a western boundary current of an ocean gyre resembling the Gulf stream, but he also showed that sub-polar gyres should develop northward of the subtropical ones, spinning in the opposite direction.

=== Climate change ===
Observations indicate that the ocean warming over the subtropical western boundary currents is two-to-three times stronger than the global mean surface ocean warming. A study found that the enhanced warming may be attributed to an intensification and poleward shift of the western boundary currents as a side-effect of the widening Hadley circulation under global warming. These warming hotspots cause severe environmental and economic problems, such as the rapid sea level rise along the East Coast of the United States, collapse of the fishery over the Gulf of Maine and Uruguay.

== See also ==
- Ekman transport – Net transport of surface water perpendicular to wind direction
- Ocean gyre – Any large system of circulating ocean surface currents
- Sverdrup balance – Theoretical relationship in oceanography
