= Equatorial Counter Current =

Shallow eastward flowing current found in the Atlantic, Indian, and Pacific Oceans

Equatorial Counter Current (in black)

The Equatorial Counter Current is an eastward flowing, wind-driven current which extends to depths of 100–150 metres (330–490 ft) in the Atlantic, Indian, and Pacific Oceans. More often called the North Equatorial Countercurrent (NECC), this current flows west-to-east at about 3-10°N in the Atlantic, Indian Ocean and Pacific basins, between the North Equatorial Current (NEC) and the South Equatorial Current (SEC). The NECC is not to be confused with the Equatorial Undercurrent (EUC) that flows eastward along the equator at depths around 200 metres (660 ft) in the western Pacific rising to 100 metres (330 ft) in the eastern Pacific.

In the Indian Ocean, circulation is dominated by the impact of the reversing Asian monsoon winds. As such, the current tends to reverse hemispheres seasonally in that basin. The NECC has a pronounced seasonal cycle in the Atlantic and Pacific, reaching maximum strength in late boreal summer and fall and minimum strength in late boreal winter and spring. Furthermore, the NECC in the Atlantic disappears in late winter and early spring.

The NECC is an interesting case because while it results from wind-driven circulation, it transports water against the mean westward wind stress in the tropics. This apparent paradox is concisely explained by Sverdrup theory, which shows that the east-west transport is governed by the north-south change in the curl of the wind stress.

The Pacific NECC is also known to be stronger during warm episodes of the El Niño-Southern Oscillation (ENSO). Klaus Wyrtki, who first reported this connection, suggested that a stronger than normal NECC could be the cause of an El Niño because of the extra volume of warm water it carried eastwards.

There is also a South Equatorial Countercurrent (SECC) that transports water from west to east in the Pacific and Atlantic basins between 2°S and 5°S in the western basin and farther south toward the east. While the SECC is geostrophic in nature, the physical mechanism for its appearance is less clear than with the NECC; that is, Sverdrup theory does not obviously explain its existence. Additionally, the seasonal cycle of the SECC is not as defined as that of the NECC.

== Theoretical background ==
The NECC is a direct response to the meridional changes in the coriolis parameter and the wind stress curl near the Intertropical Convergence Zone (ITCZ). In part the NECC owes its existence to the fact that the ITCZ is not located at the equator, rather several degrees of latitude to the north. The rapid relative change in the coriolis parameter (a function of latitude) near the equator combined with the ITCZ being located north of the equator leads to similar rapid changes in the surface Ekman transport of the ocean and areas of convergence and divergence in the oceanic mixed layer. Using the larger Pacific basin as an example, the resulting dynamic height pattern consists of a trough at the equator, and ridge near 5° degrees north, a trough at 10°N, and finally a ridge closer to 20°N. From geostrophy (the perfect balance between the mass field and velocity field), the NECC is located between the ridge and trough at 5°N and 10°N, respectively.

Sverdrup theory succinctly summarizes this phenomenon mathematically by defining a geostrophic mass transport per unit latitude, M, as the east-west integral of the meridional derivative of wind stress curl, minus any Ekman transport. The Ekman transport into the current is typically negligible, at least in the Pacific NECC. The total NECC is found by simply integrating M over the relevant latitudes.

== Atlantic North Equatorial Countercurrent ==
The Atlantic NECC consists of the eastward zonal transport of water between 3°N and 9°N, with typical widths on the order of 300 km. The Atlantic NECC is unique among the equatorial currents in that basin because of its extreme seasonality. The maximum eastward flow is attained in late boreal summer and fall while the countercurrent is replaced by westward flow in late winter and spring. The NECC has maximum transport of approximately 40 Sv (10^6 m3/s) at 38°W. Transport reaches 30 Sv two months per year at 44°W, while farther east at 38°W the transport reaches that level five months per year. The magnitude of the NECC weakens substantially east of 38°W due to water being absorbed by the westward equatorial current south of 3°N.

While the variability of the Atlantic NECC is dominated by the annual cycle (weak late winter, strong late summer), there is also interannual variability as well. The strength of the Atlantic NECC is notably stronger in years following El Niño in the tropical Pacific, with 1983 and 1987 being notable examples. Physically, this implies that the altered convection in the Pacific Ocean due to El Niño drives changes in the meridional gradient of wind stress curl over the equatorial Atlantic.

== Pacific North Equatorial Countercurrent ==
The Pacific NECC is a major eastward moving surface current that transports more than 20 Sv from the West Pacific warm pool to the cooler east Pacific. In the western Pacific the countercurrent is centred near 5°N while in the central Pacific it is located near 7°N.

At the surface, the current is located on the southern slope of the North Equatorial Trough, a region of low sea level which extends from east to west across the Pacific. The low sea level is a result of Ekman suction caused by the increased easterly winds found just to the north of the Intertropical Convergence Zone (ITCZ). In the western basin, the NECC may merge with the Equatorial Undercurrent (EUC) below the surface. Generally, the current weakens to the east in the basin, with estimated flows of 21 Sv, 14.2 Sv, and 12 Sv in the western, central, and eastern Pacific, respectively.

Like the Atlantic NECC, the Pacific NECC undergoes an annual cycle. This is a result of the annual Rossby wave. Early each year increased winds in the eastern Pacific generate a region of lower sea level. Over the following months this propagates westward as an oceanic Rossby wave. Its fastest component, near 6°N, reaches the western Pacific around mid-summer. At higher latitudes the wave travels more slowly. As a result in the western Pacific the NECC tends to be weaker than normal in the boral winter and spring, and stronger than normal in the summer and autumn.

== Fluctuations of the Pacific NECC with El Niño ==
The Pacific NECC is known to be stronger during classic El Niño events, when there is an anomalous warming of the eastern and central Pacific that peaks in the boreal winter. Klaus Wyrtki was the first to report the connection, in the early 1970s, based on analysis of tide-gauge measurements at Pacific island stations on either side of the current. On the basis of this analysis, Wyrtki hypothesized that such an unusually strong NECC in the western Pacific would lead to an anomalous accumulation of warm water of the coast of Central America and thus an El Niño.

== See also ==
- Coral bleaching
- Ocean current
- Oceanic gyres
- Physical oceanography
- Walker circulation
- Humboldt Current
