= Ring shedding =

Ocean current phenomenon

Ring shedding is a phenomenon in ocean currents where circles or ring-shaped eddies separate from the current. The rings are independent water current systems that can persist for several months and occur in most ocean basins. The separated rings can have both warm or cold cores and play a role in the thermohaline circulation, interoceanic mixing, and nutrient supply for algae and bacteria. The physical processes behind ring shedding are not fully understood yet and are thus an active subject of research.

== Process of ring shedding ==
Ring shedding often takes place in the retroflection region, the region where the current loops back, as the retroflection is a condition for ring shedding to take place. The turbulent and dynamic nature of the ocean causes the current loop to sometimes close onto itself and separate ("shed") from the current. This results in an independent ring current that drifts away from the main current. The exact moment a ring is shed from the current is often unclear and the process behind it is still an active subject of research. The topography of the ocean floor and incoming eddies from upstream regions could play a role in ring shedding. Other research indicates that ring shedding is driven by barotropic instabilities. When the retroflection region destabilizes, the loop can separate from the current, forming a ring.

== Characteristics and observation ==
The process of ring shedding was first described by Fuglisteri in 1972, who observed rings in the Gulf Stream. Since then, ring shedding has been observed in most ocean basins. Typically, the rings have a diameter of 100 to 400 kilometres (62 to 249 miles), a depth of up to 1,500 metres (4,900 feet), and a temperature anomaly of a few degrees Celsius. The rings drift slowly (0 to 5 kilometres (0.0 to 3.1 miles) per day) until they either decay or are reabsorbed by their parent current.

There are two main types of rings: cold core rings and warm core rings. The warm cores rings are easy to observe: due to their temperature anomaly satellites can detect them with infrared images. Due to geostrophy (and to a lesser extent the expansion of the warmer water), these warm core rings have a higher local sea surface height and can hence also be observed by buoys or satellites using radar altimeters to map the topography of the ocean.

Cold core rings are more difficult to observe as their initial colder surface is warmed by solar radiation. However, under the surface the colder water temperatures persist longer and deeper, allowing measurement and observation using vertical ocean profiles of temperature and salinity.

== Occurrence ==
=== Kuroshio ===
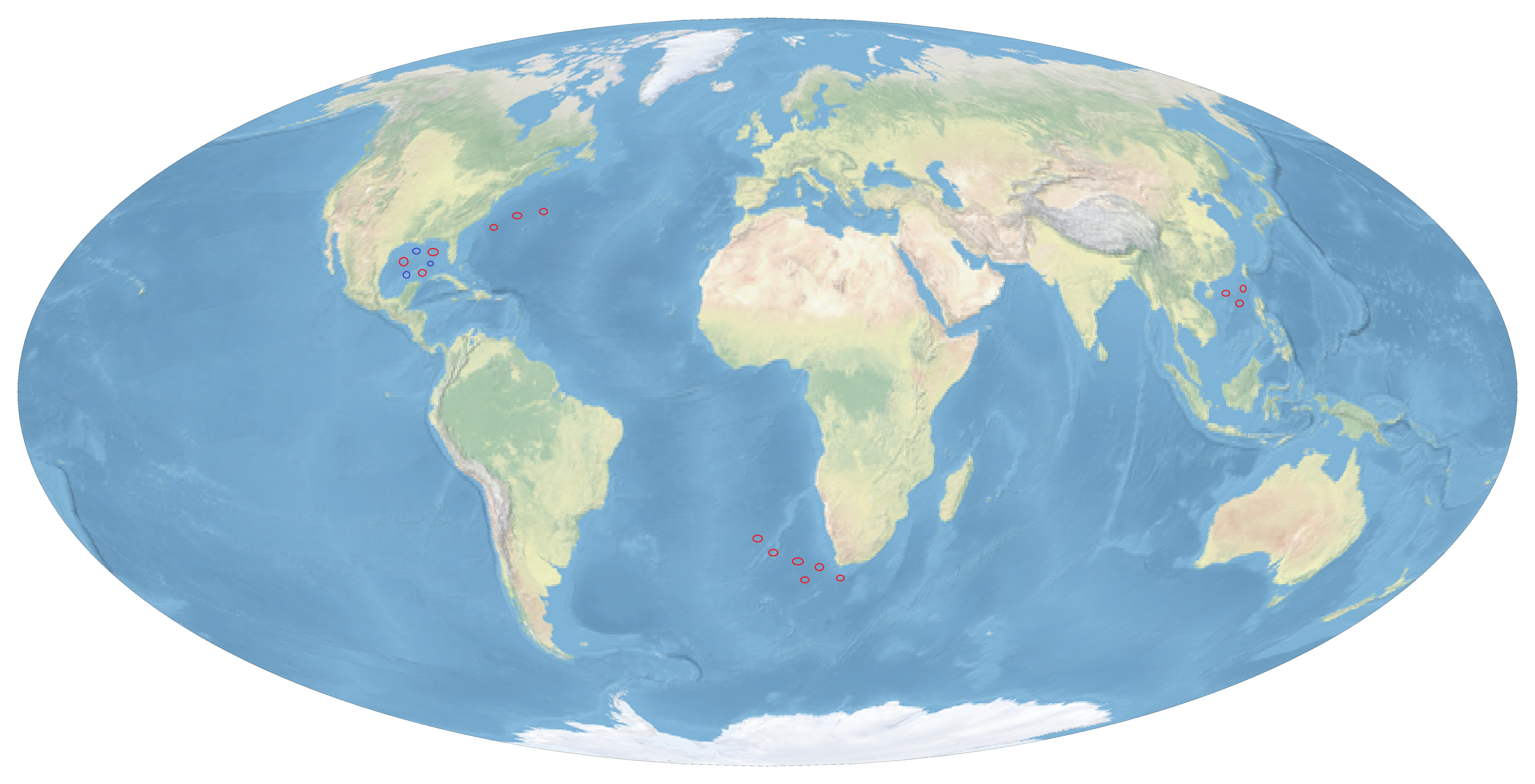
Places where ring shedding occurs that are discussed on this page are depicted by red and blue rings. Red rings are warm core and blue rings are cold core.

The Kuroshio current is a western boundary current in the Northeast Pacific Ocean. In 1994, ring shedding was first observed where the Kuroshio current loops into the South China Sea. The observed current ring was a warm core, anticyclonic ring with a diameter of about 150 kilometres (93 mi) and detached from the Kuroshio in the Luzon Strait. The ring had a current speed of about 1 metre per second (3.3 ft/s) near the surface. The ring had positive temperature anomalies up until a depth of 1 kilometre (0.62 mi).

=== Gulf Stream ===
In the Gulf Stream ring shedding takes place at two locations: in the Gulf of Mexico and along the eastern coast of the United States. The Loop current, as its name suggests, loops into the Gulf of Mexico. At the point of retroflection, ring shedding results in both warm core anticyclonic and cold core cyclonic rings. These rings can have diameters up to 400 kilometres (250 mi) and reach depths of 1,500 metres (4,900 ft). The frequency of the ring shedding in the Loop current has a high interannual variability. However, a shift in the regime of ring shedding has been observed. During the period 1980–1999, there were on average 18 rings shed in the Gulf of Mexico per year, whereas the average between 2000 and 2017 was 33 rings per year. The underlying geophysical reason for this shift in regime around 2000 is still a topic of debate.

Further down the Gulf Stream, along the eastern coast of the United States, ring shedding also takes place, albeit much less frequently. Here only warm core, anticyclonic rings with a diameter of typically 100 to 200 kilometres (62 to 124 mi) are formed. These rings only occur once or twice a year and most of them drift slowly westwards until they are reabsorbed by the Gulf Stream after several months.

=== Agulhas current ===
The Agulhas current flows alongside the coast of southeast Africa until it retroflects at the tip of South Africa. Ring shedding occurs in this retroflection region. The rings are warm core and anticyclonic, with a frequency of 4-6 rings per year. However, the shedding of rings happens very irregularly and long periods of almost half a year without any rings occur. The Agulhas rings transport warm and salty water to the Southern Atlantic Ocean. The water from the Agulhas rings can be up to 5 °C (41 °F) warmer than the water in the Southern Atlantic. The rings from the Agulhas current transport about 15 Sverdrup to the Atlantic Ocean, thereby playing an important role in thermohaline circulation. The exact cause of ring shedding in the Agulhas retroflection region is still unclear. One possible cause is incoming eddies from upstream regions. A second proposed explanation is that the ring shedding is caused by barotropic instabilities in the Agulhas retroflection region.

== Effects ==
=== Thermohaline circulation ===
Ring shedding might play an important role in the thermohaline circulation, depending on the location. The movement of the Agulhas rings are paired with leakage of warm and saline Indian Ocean water in the Southern Atlantic Ocean. These rings move in the northwest direction in the Atlantic Ocean and are important for the renewal of North Atlantic Deep Water.

=== Iron supply ===
Cold core rings in the Gulf Stream have higher iron concentrations than the subtropical water in other regions of the Northern Atlantic Ocean. Hence, the rings transport iron-rich water from the continental slope to other parts of the Northern Atlantic Ocean. For cyanobacteria, this incoming flux of iron is very important, as they require high iron concentrations to live in these parts of the Atlantic Ocean.
