= Amalda whatmoughi =

Scientific classification
- Kingdom: Animalia
- Phylum: Mollusca
- Class: Gastropoda
- Subclass: Caenogastropoda
- Order: Neogastropoda
- Family: Ancillariidae
- Genus: Amalda
- Species: A. whatmoughi

Binomial name
- Amalda whatmoughi Kilburn, 1993

Species of gastropod

Amalda whatmoughi is a species of sea snail, a marine gastropod mollusk in the family Ancillariidae.

== Description ==
The length of the shell attains 14.5 mm, its diameter is 5.8 mm.

== Distribution ==
This marine species was found on the Agulhas Bank, South Africa.
