= Amalda jenneri =

Scientific classification
- Kingdom: Animalia
- Phylum: Mollusca
- Class: Gastropoda
- Subclass: Caenogastropoda
- Order: Neogastropoda
- Family: Ancillariidae
- Genus: Amalda
- Species: A. jenneri

Binomial name
- Amalda jenneri Kilburn, 1977

Species of gastropod

Amalda jenneri is a species of sea snail, a marine gastropod mollusk in the family Ancillariidae.

== Description ==
The length of the shell varies between 10 mm and 17 mm, its diameter is between 5.2 mm and 8 mm.

== Distribution ==
This marine species was found on the Agulhas Bank, South Africa.
