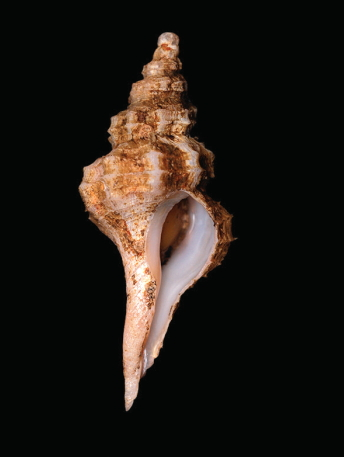
- Shell of Fusinus hayesi

Scientific classification
- Kingdom: Animalia
- Phylum: Mollusca
- Class: Gastropoda
- Subclass: Caenogastropoda
- Order: Neogastropoda
- Family: Fasciolariidae
- Genus: Fusinus
- Species: F. hayesi

Binomial name
- Fusinus hayesi Snyder, 1996

= Fusinus hayesi =

Species of gastropod

Fusinus hayesi, common name Hayes' spindle shell, is a species of sea snail, a marine gastropod mollusk in the family Fasciolariidae, the spindle snails, the tulip snails and their allies.

== Description ==
The length of the shell reaches up to 60 mm.

The shell is small, broadly spindle-shaped, with rounded whorls and a strongly indented suture. The spire makes up about three-quarters of the total aperture length. It is sculpted with crisp, narrow (angular) spiral cords and distinct axial ribs, especially prominent on the spire whorls. The siphonal canal is long and slender.

The color of the shell ranges from white to pale brown, with the axial ribs often appearing lighter than the spaces between them. The periostracum is a pale horn-brown.

== Distribution ==
This marine species is endemic to South Africa and occurs off the Eastern Agulhas Bank at depths between 100 m and 150 m.
