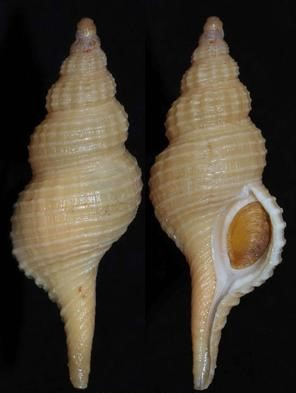

Scientific classification
- Kingdom: Animalia
- Phylum: Mollusca
- Class: Gastropoda
- Subclass: Caenogastropoda
- Order: Neogastropoda
- Family: Fasciolariidae
- Genus: Fusinus
- Species: F. africanae

Binomial name
- Fusinus africanae (Barnard, 1959)

Synonyms
- Fusus africanae Barnard, 1849

= Fusinus africanae =

Species of gastropod

Fusinus africanae is a species of sea snail, a marine gastropod mollusk in the family Fasciolariidae, the spindle snails, the tulip snails and their allies.

== Description ==
Adult individuals rarely exceed 45 mm in length.

The shell is small, relatively robust, and spindle-shaped, with rounded whorls and a strongly indented suture. The spire makes up about three-quarters of the total aperture length. It is sculpted with distinct, flat spiral cords and closely set, rounded axial ribs, which are weaker on the body whorl and sometimes almost absent in certain individuals. The siphonal canal is long with a very narrow opening, and the protoconch is large.

The shell ranges from white to apricot, typically lacking any additional color patterns. Living specimens are often encrusted with a thick brown sponge coating.

== Distribution ==
This marine species is endemic to South Africa, found along the Agulhas Bank from the Cape Peninsula to Algoa Bay at depths of 100 m to 300 meters.
