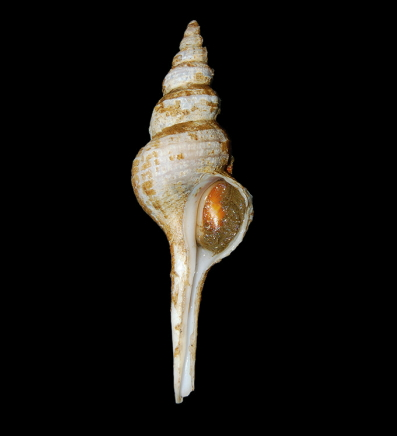
- Shell of Chryseofusus bonaespei

Scientific classification
- Kingdom: Animalia
- Phylum: Mollusca
- Class: Gastropoda
- Subclass: Caenogastropoda
- Order: Neogastropoda
- Family: Fasciolariidae
- Genus: Chryseofusus
- Species: C. bonaespei

Binomial name
- Chryseofusus bonaespei (Barnard, 1959)

Synonyms
- Fusinus bonaespei (Barnard, 1959); Fusus bonaespei Barnard, 1959; Fusus capensis Thiele, 1925 (invalid: junior homonym of Fusus capensis Dunker, 1844)

= Chryseofusus bonaespei =

Species of gastropod

Chryseofusus bonaespei, common name the Good Hope spindle shell, is a species of sea snail, a marine gastropod mollusk in the family Fasciolariidae, the spindle snails, the tulip snails and their allies.

== Description ==
The length of the shell attains 110 mm.

The shell is spindle-shaped with rounded whorls and a strongly indented suture. The spire is equal to, or slightly shorter than, the total length of the aperture. The siphonal canal is long and slender. The sculpture consists of narrow spiral cords with finer intermediary threads. Distinct axial ribs are present on the early spire whorls but become less evident on the later whorls. The inner lip lacks columellar pleats, and the interior of the outer lip is smooth.

The shell is white with a pale horn-brown periostracum, which often flakes off. The animal itself is creamy white.

== Distribution ==
This marine species is endemic to South Africa and occurs off the West coast and Agulhas Bank (Cape Columbine to Algoa Bay), at depths between 50 m and 600 m.
