= Chryseofusus hyphalus =

Scientific classification
- Kingdom: Animalia
- Phylum: Mollusca
- Class: Gastropoda
- Subclass: Caenogastropoda
- Order: Neogastropoda
- Family: Fasciolariidae
- Genus: Chryseofusus
- Species: C. hyphalus

Binomial name
- Chryseofusus hyphalus (M. Smith, 1940)

Synonyms
- Fusinus hyphalus M. Smith, 1940

Species of gastropod

Chryseofusus hyphalus is a species of sea snail, a marine gastropod mollusk in the family Fasciolariidae, the spindle snails, the tulip snails and their allies.

== Description ==
The shell size varies between 35 mm and 96 mm

== Distribution ==
This species is distributed in the seas along the Philippines, Taiwan and Japan.
