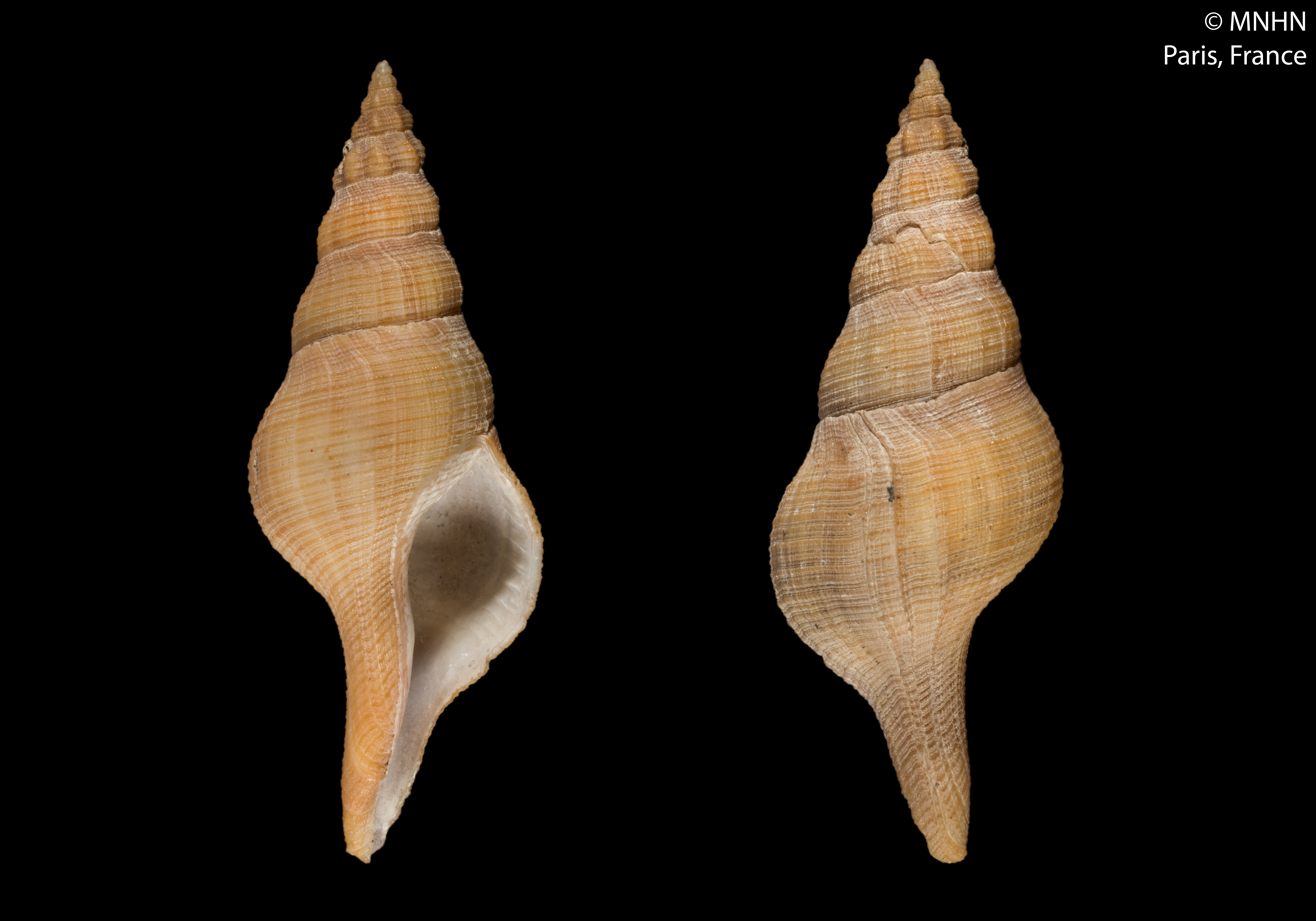
- Shell of Chryseofusus bradneri (holotype at MNHN, Paris)

Scientific classification
- Kingdom: Animalia
- Phylum: Mollusca
- Class: Gastropoda
- Subclass: Caenogastropoda
- Order: Neogastropoda
- Family: Fasciolariidae
- Genus: Chryseofusus
- Species: C. bradneri

Binomial name
- Chryseofusus bradneri (Drivas & Jay, 1990)

Synonyms
- Fusinus (Chryseofusus) bradneri (Drivas & Jay, 1990); Fusinus bradneri Drivas & Jay, 1990; Siphonofusus bradneri Drivas & Jay, 1990

= Chryseofusus bradneri =

Species of gastropod

Chryseofusus bradneri is a species of sea snail, a marine gastropod mollusk in the family Fasciolariidae, the spindle snails, the tulip snails and their allies.

== Description ==
The length of the shell attains 53.9 mm.

== Distribution ==
This species occurs in the Indian Ocean off Réunion.
