= Chryseofusus alisonae =

Scientific classification
- Kingdom: Animalia
- Phylum: Mollusca
- Class: Gastropoda
- Subclass: Caenogastropoda
- Order: Neogastropoda
- Family: Fasciolariidae
- Genus: Chryseofusus
- Species: C. alisonae

Binomial name
- Chryseofusus alisonae (Hadorn, Snyder & Fraussen, 2008)

Synonyms
- Fusinus (Chryseofusus) alisonae Hadorn, Snyder & Fraussen, 2008 (basionym); Fusinus alisonae Hadorn, Snyder & Fraussen, 2008

Species of gastropod

Chryseofusus alisonae is a species of sea snail, a marine gastropod mollusk in the family Fasciolariidae, the spindle snails, the tulip snails and their allies.
