= Chryseofusus kazdailisi =

Scientific classification
- Kingdom: Animalia
- Phylum: Mollusca
- Class: Gastropoda
- Subclass: Caenogastropoda
- Order: Neogastropoda
- Family: Fasciolariidae
- Genus: Chryseofusus
- Species: C. kazdailisi

Binomial name
- Chryseofusus kazdailisi (Fraussen & Hadorn, 2000)

Synonyms
- Fusinus kazdailisi Fraussen & Hadorn, 2000

Species of gastropod

Chryseofusus kazdailisi is a species of sea snail, a marine gastropod mollusk in the family Fasciolariidae, the spindle snails, the tulip snails and their allies.
