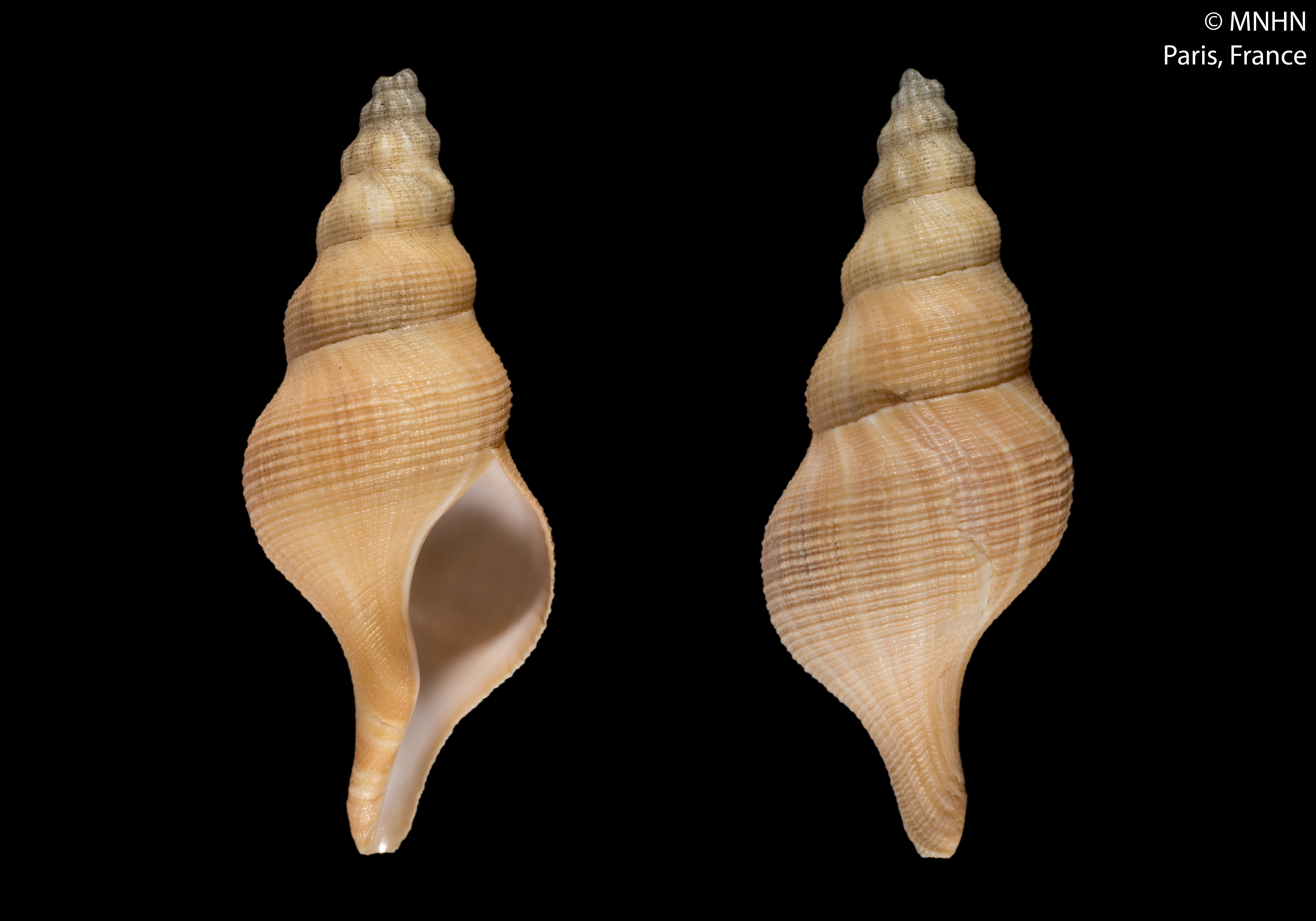
- Shell of Chryseofusus dapsilis (holotype at MNHN, Paris)

Scientific classification
- Kingdom: Animalia
- Phylum: Mollusca
- Class: Gastropoda
- Subclass: Caenogastropoda
- Order: Neogastropoda
- Family: Fasciolariidae
- Genus: Chryseofusus
- Species: C. dapsilis

Binomial name
- Chryseofusus dapsilis Hadorn & Fraussen, 2003

Synonyms
- Fusinus (Chryseofusus) dapsilis Hadorn & Fraussen, 2003 (accepted, alternate representation); Fusinus dapsilis Hadorn & Fraussen, 2003

= Chryseofusus dapsilis =

Species of gastropod

Chryseofusus dapsilis is a species of sea snail, a marine gastropod mollusk in the family Fasciolariidae (the spindle snails, the tulip snails, and their allies).

== Description ==
The shell has a fusiform shape, with horizontal ridges along the exterior and a long aperture. Chryseofusus dapsilis grows to a shell size of 75 mm (3.0 in).

== Distribution ==
This marine species occurs off Vietnam.
