= Chryseofusus subangulatus =

Scientific classification
- Kingdom: Animalia
- Phylum: Mollusca
- Class: Gastropoda
- Subclass: Caenogastropoda
- Order: Neogastropoda
- Family: Fasciolariidae
- Genus: Chryseofusus
- Species: C. subangulatus

Binomial name
- Chryseofusus subangulatus (von Martens, 1901)

Synonyms
- Fusus subangulatus von Martens, 1901; Fusinus subangulatus (Martens, 1901)

Species of gastropod

Chryseofusus subangulatus is a species of sea snail, a marine gastropod mollusk in the family Fasciolariidae, the spindle snails, the tulip snails and their allies.
