= Cold-core ring =

Type of oceanic eddy

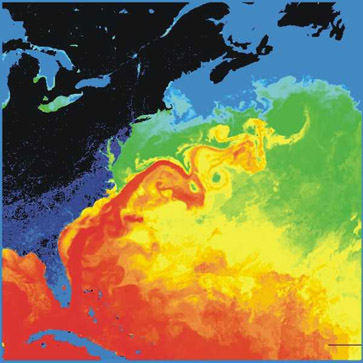
An image depicting the formation of eddies as a closed off meander and a cold core ring.

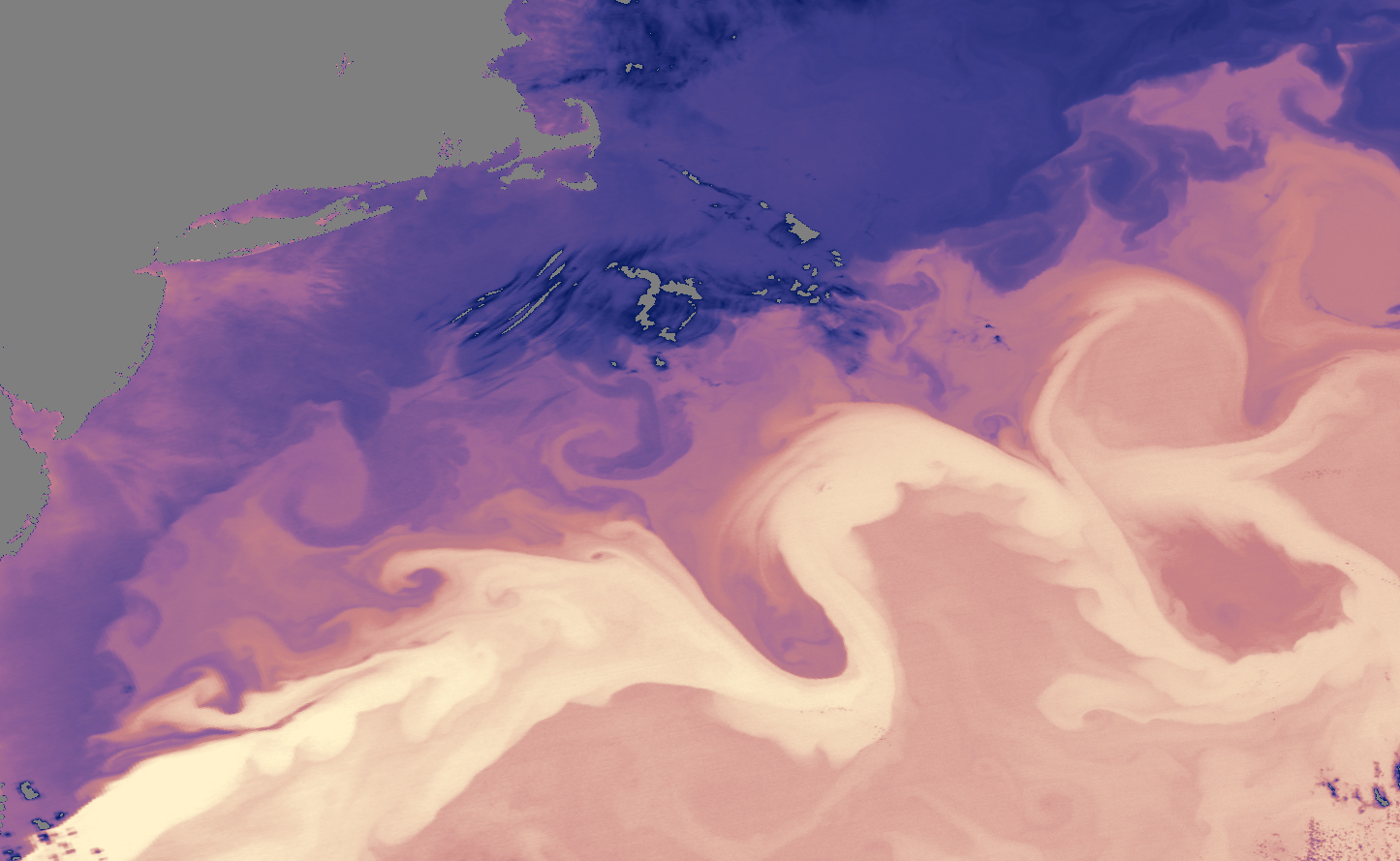
The meanders of the gulf stream can form eddies. The image depicts a cold core ring as well as a meander of the gulf stream in the process of forming a cold core ring.

Cold-core rings are a type of oceanic eddy, which are characterized as unstable, time-dependent swirling, independent "cells" that separate from their respective ocean current and move into water bodies with different physical, chemical, and biological characteristics, often bringing the characteristics of the waters of their origin into the water bodies into which they travel. Their size can range from 1 millimeter (0.039 in) to over 10,000 kilometers (6,200 mi) in diameter with depths over 5 kilometers (3.1 mi). Cold-core rings are the product of warm water currents wrapping around a colder water mass as it deviates away from its respective current. The direction an eddy swirls can be categorized as either cyclonic or anticyclonic, which is, in the Northern Hemisphere, counterclockwise and clockwise respectively, and in the Southern Hemisphere, clockwise and counterclockwise respectively as a result of the Coriolis effect. Although eddies have large amounts of kinetic energy, their rotation is relatively quick to decrease in relation to the amount of viscous friction in water. They typically last for a few weeks to a year. The nature of eddies are such that the center of the eddy, the outer swirling ring, and the surrounding waters are well-stratified and maintain all of their distinctive physical, chemical, and biological properties throughout the eddy's lifetime, before losing their distinctive characteristics at the end of the life of the cold-core ring.

== Formation ==
The governing forces of an eddy are very dependent on its size. Small eddies are largely governed by viscosity and direction of the flow of a water body. However, larger eddies are formed from a balance between the horizontal pressure gradient force, arising from differences in densities of the meeting water masses, and the Coriolis force. Due to the turbulent nature of the Earth's oceans, eddies can be found almost everywhere. Mesoscale eddies are usually seen in areas of intense, meandering currents such as the Gulf Stream and the Antarctic Circumpolar Current that feeds into the South Pacific and Indian oceans, but in general can be caused by a combination of factors such as cooling of sea surface temperature, convection, direct generation from wind, or flow past an irregular or jagged coastline. Cyclonic cold-core eddies are frequently formed at the polar front by the Gulf Stream and Labrador Current. The cold, nutrient-rich waters from the Labrador Sea flow south and get caught in the eastward meandering of the Gulf Stream, traveling eastward across the Atlantic Ocean. Generally, cold-core rings are formed when meanders expanding southeast are pinched from the Gulf Stream.

== Permanent and semi-permanent cold core rings ==
Semi-permanent and permanent eddies are also relatively abundant throughout the world. These permanent and semi-permanent rings often form systematically in the same manner and often with the same drift and properties. Some permanent eddies are regular enough to be given names within the ocean current system, such as the cold-core Agulhas Ring off the tip of South Africa. Western boundary currents like the Agulhas, Brazil, and East Australian Currents are known for shedding eddies downward off from their ending points. A semi-permanent cold-core eddy is periodically formed by the Loop Current in the eastern Gulf of Mexico, where warm water from the South Equatorial Current travels upwards through the southern Caribbean Sea and flows into the Loop Current off the coast of Cancun.

== Characteristics and structure ==
Despite being surrounded by the highly saline and generally nutrient-devoid waters in the middles of oceanic gyres, cold-core rings, especially those found in the Sargasso Sea from the Gulf Stream, have the ability to transport the nutrients and biota of the colder regions from which they originated into the warmer regions into which they travel. In Gulf Rings, the transport of nutrients facilitated by the cold-core rings may be instrumental in sustaining the reduced productivity of the Sargasso Sea. As such, the cold-core rings formed off the Gulf Stream are likely to influence the widespread distribution of zooplankton. The sizes of cold-core rings can vary, typically from 100 to 300 kilometres (62 to 186 miles), and they can at a speed of 1.5 metres per second (3.4 mph).

All eddies are capable of transporting energy, momentum, heat, physical and chemical water properties, and even small organisms across very large distances, even when surrounded by waters that would not be conducive to the same. Since eddies mix waters with different properties, they act as exchanges of nutrients from the continental shelf to the deeper ocean with differing properties as they travel. This makes them ideal locations for primary productivity, especially in areas of low nutrients, such as the centers of open ocean gyres, such as the Sargasso Sea. The importance of these swirling masses lies in the incredible amount of kinetic energy they are able to transport both horizontally and vertically, their participation in air-sea interactions, and the irreversible mixing of water masses. These processes all contribute to the transfer of nutrients, oxygen, and trace chemicals, ocean stratification and density fields, and patterns of warmth that drive atmospheric and oceanic circulation.

=== Transportation and habitation of organisms ===
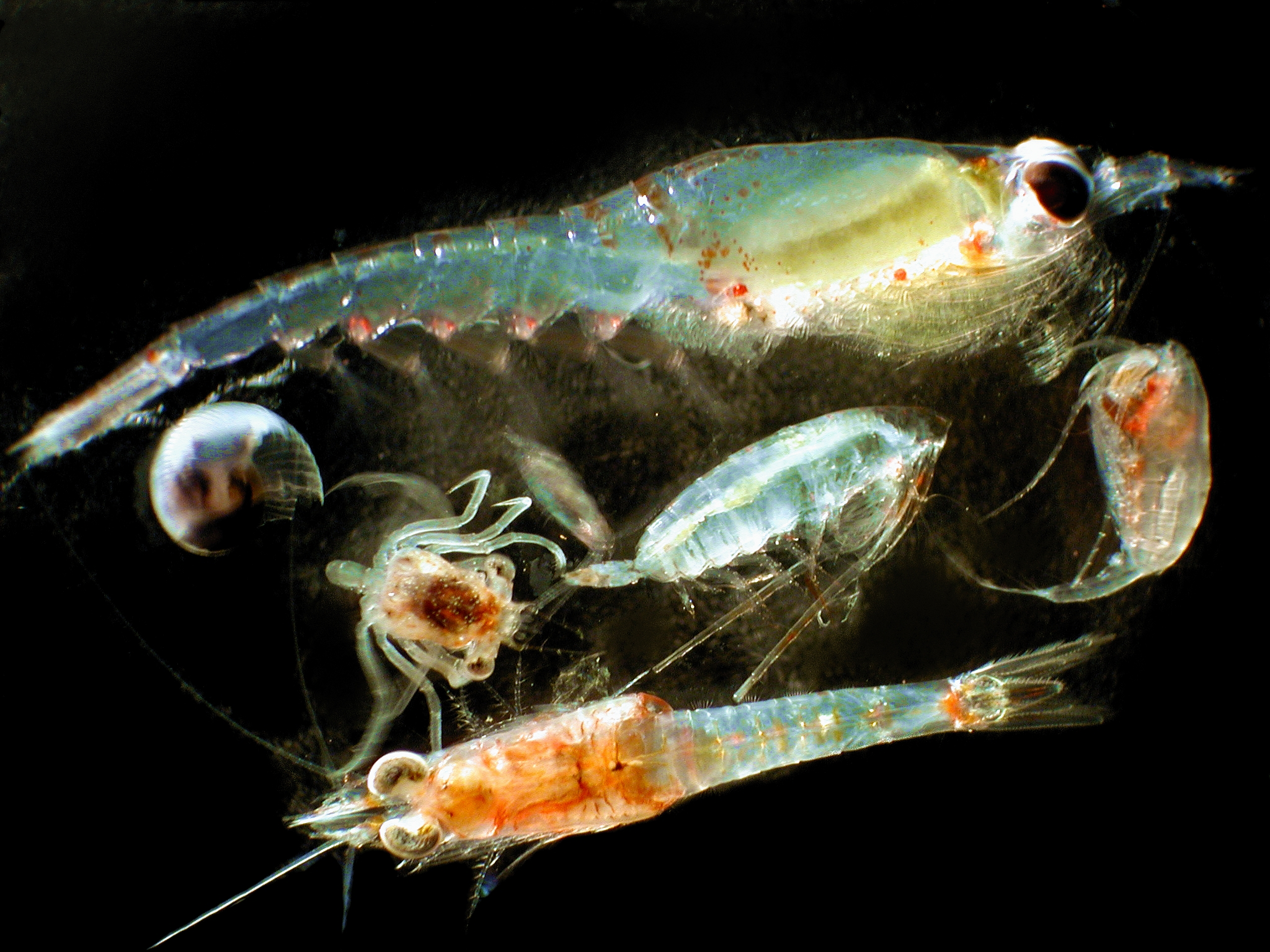
Zooplankton are frequently influenced and displaced by the course of cold core rings.

In a study conducted in 1993, it was shown that cold-core rings had the ability to transport species such as medusae and siphonophores, and that even while surrounded completely by a warmer body of water, the medusae that were abundant outside of the cold-core ring were not abundant within, and vice versa, showing that the conditions within and without the cold-core ring are conducive to certain species of medusae that otherwise would not be able to thrive in the original waters.

== See also ==
- Warm core ring
- Gulf Stream
- Vortex shedding
