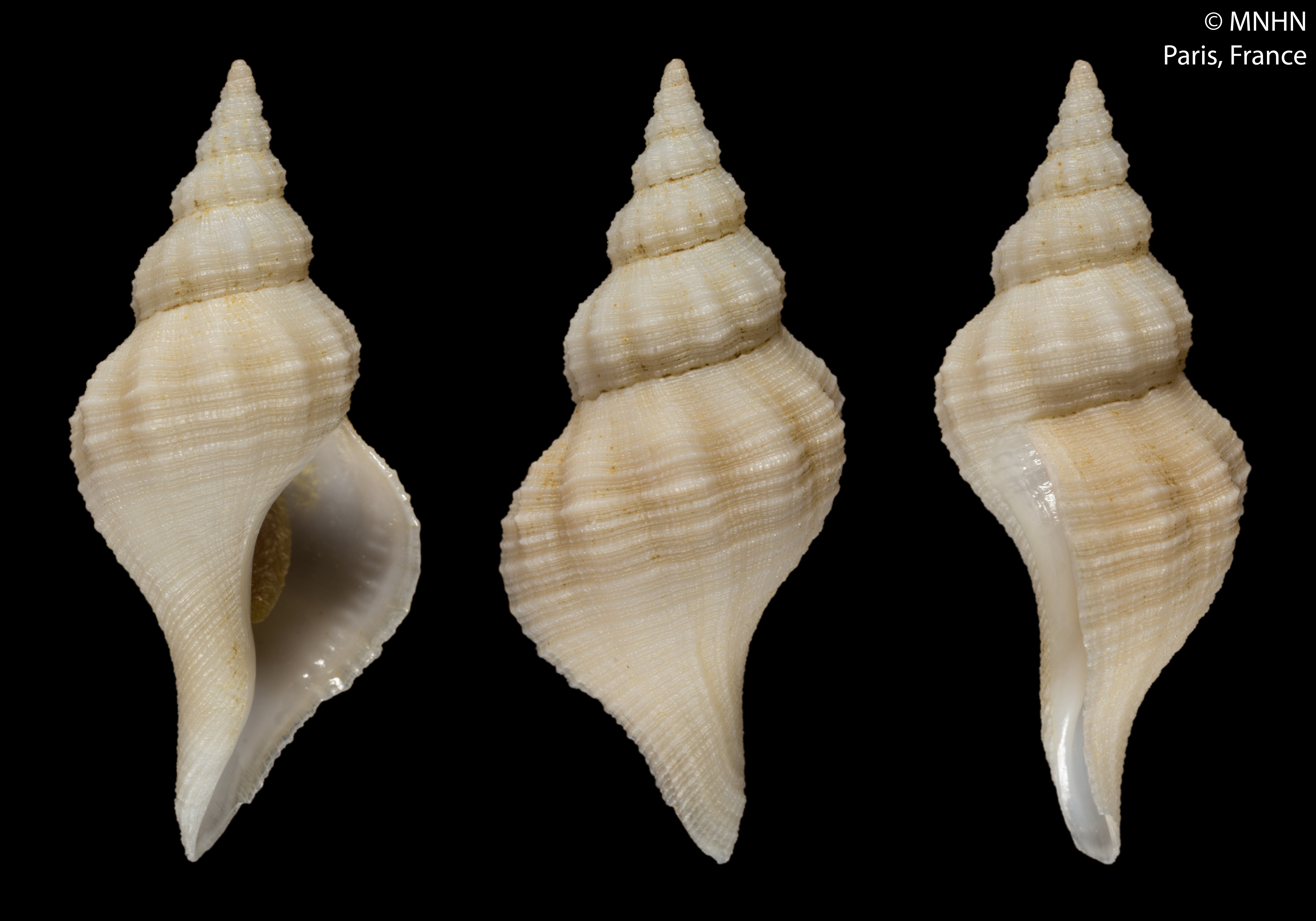

Scientific classification
- Kingdom: Animalia
- Phylum: Mollusca
- Class: Gastropoda
- Subclass: Caenogastropoda
- Order: Neogastropoda
- Family: Fasciolariidae
- Genus: Chryseofusus
- Species: C. scissus

Binomial name
- Chryseofusus scissus (Hadorn & Fraussen, 2003)

Synonyms
- Fusinus (Chryseofusus) scissus Hadorn & Fraussen, 2003; Fusinus scissus Hadorn & Fraussen, 2003

= Chryseofusus scissus =

Species of gastropod

Chryseofusus scissus is a species of sea snail, a marine gastropod mollusk in the family Fasciolariidae, the spindle snails, the tulip snails, and their allies.

== Description ==
The length of the shell attains 33 mm.

Their functional type is benthos.

Their feeding type is predatory.

== Distribution ==
This marine species occurs off New Caledonia.
