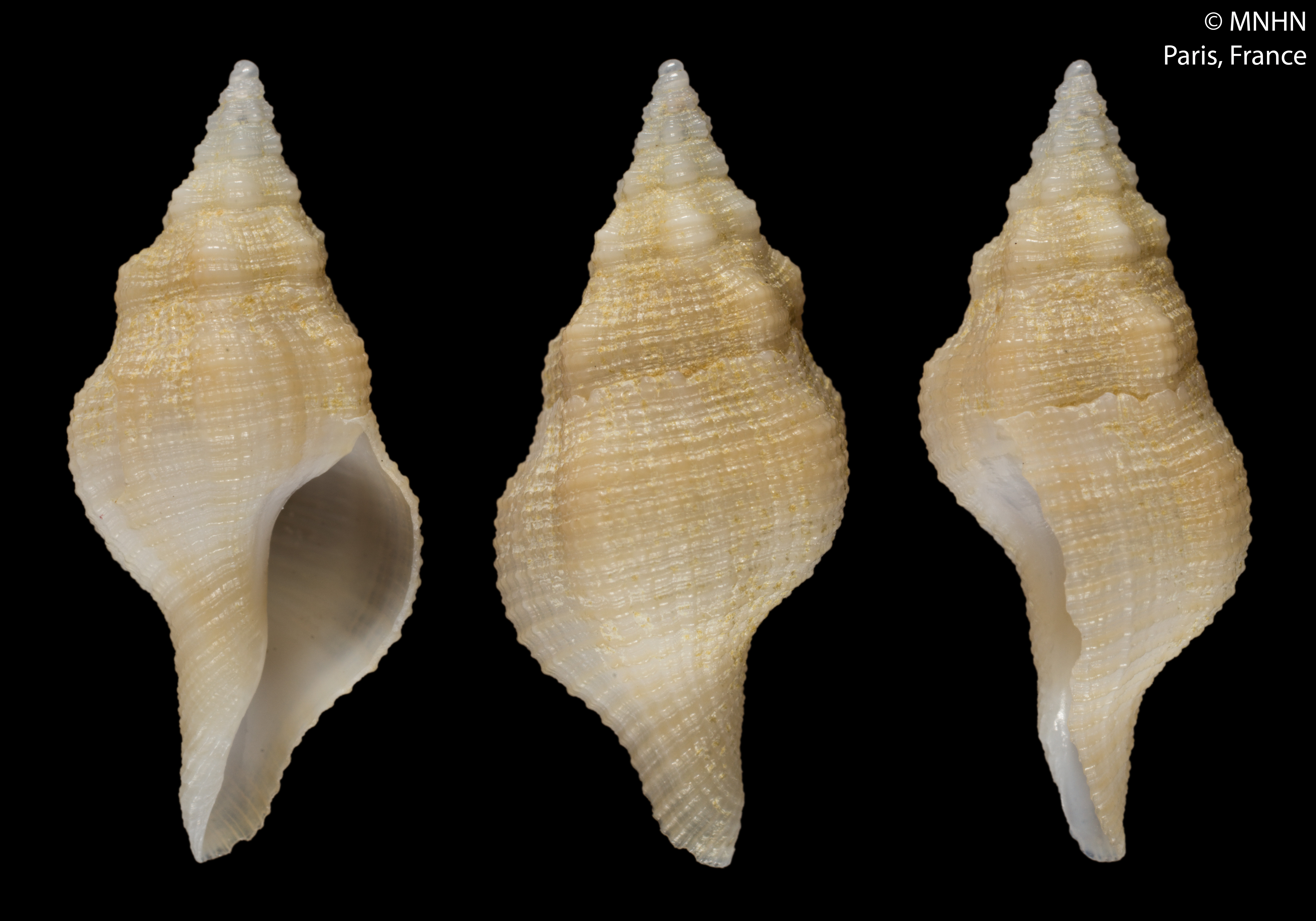
- Shell of Chryseofusus riscus (holotype at MNHN, Paris)

Scientific classification
- Kingdom: Animalia
- Phylum: Mollusca
- Class: Gastropoda
- Subclass: Caenogastropoda
- Order: Neogastropoda
- Family: Fasciolariidae
- Genus: Chryseofusus
- Species: C. riscus

Binomial name
- Chryseofusus riscus (Hadorn & Fraussen, 2003)

Synonyms
- Fusinus (Chryseofusus) riscus (Hadorn & Fraussen, 2003)· accepted, alternate representation; Fusinus riscus Hdorn & Fraussen, 2003

= Chryseofusus riscus =

Species of gastropod

Chryseofusus riscus is a species of sea snail, a marine gastropod mollusk in the family Fasciolariidae, the spindle snails, the tulip snails and their allies.

== Description ==
The length of the shell attains 19.1 mm.

== Distribution ==
This marine species occurs off New Caledonia.
