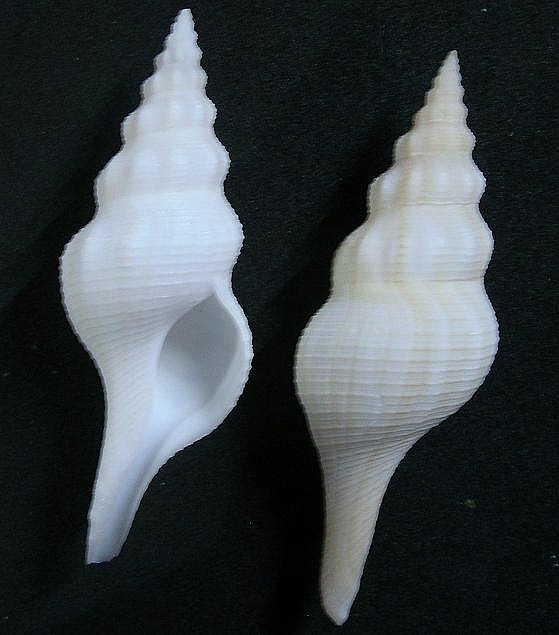
- Chryseofusus jurgeni

Scientific classification
- Kingdom: Animalia
- Phylum: Mollusca
- Class: Gastropoda
- Subclass: Caenogastropoda
- Order: Neogastropoda
- Superfamily: Buccinoidea
- Family: Fasciolariidae
- Genus: Chryseofusus; Hadorn & Fraussen, 2003

Type species
- Fusus chrysodomoides Schepman, 1911

Synonyms
- Fusinus (Chryseofusus) Hadorn & Fraussen, 2003

= Chryseofusus =

Genus of gastropods

Chryseofusus is a genus of sea snails, marine gastropod mollusks in the subfamily Fusininae of the family Fasciolariidae, the spindle snails, the tulip snails and their allies.

Originally a subgenus of Fusinus, Chryseofusus was raised to the rank of genus by Callomon & Snyder, 2009

== Species ==
Species within the genus Chryseofusus include:

- Chryseofusus acherusius (Hadorn & Fraussen, 2003)
- Chryseofusus alisae (Hadorn & Fraussen, 2003)
- Chryseofusus alisonae (Hadorn, Snyder & Fraussen, 2008)
- Chryseofusus artutus (Fraussen & Hadorn, 2003)
- Chryseofusus bonaespei (Barnard, 1959)
- Chryseofusus bradneri (Drivas & Jay, 1990)
- Chryseofusus cadus (Hadorn & Fraussen, 2003)
- Chryseofusus chrysodomoides (Schepman, 1911)
- Chryseofusus dapsilis (Hadorn & Fraussen, 2003)
- Chryseofusus graciliformis (G.B. Sowerby II, 1880)
- Chryseofusus hyphalus (M. Smith, 1940)
- Chryseofusus jurgeni (Hadorn & Fraussen, 2002)
- Chryseofusus kazdailisi (Fraussen & Hadorn, 2000)
- Chryseofusus lecourtorum Fraussen & Stahlschmidt, 2014
- Chryseofusus lorenzi Fraussen & Stahlschmidt, 2014
- Chryseofusus riscus (Hadorn & Fraussen, 2003)
- Chryseofusus satsumaensis (Hadorn & Chino, 2005)
- Chryseofusus scissus (Fraussen & Hadorn, 2003)
- Chryseofusus subangulatus (Martens, 1901)
- Chryseofusus wareni (Hadorn & Fraussen, 2003)
- Chryseofusus westralis (Hadorn & Fraussen, 2003)
