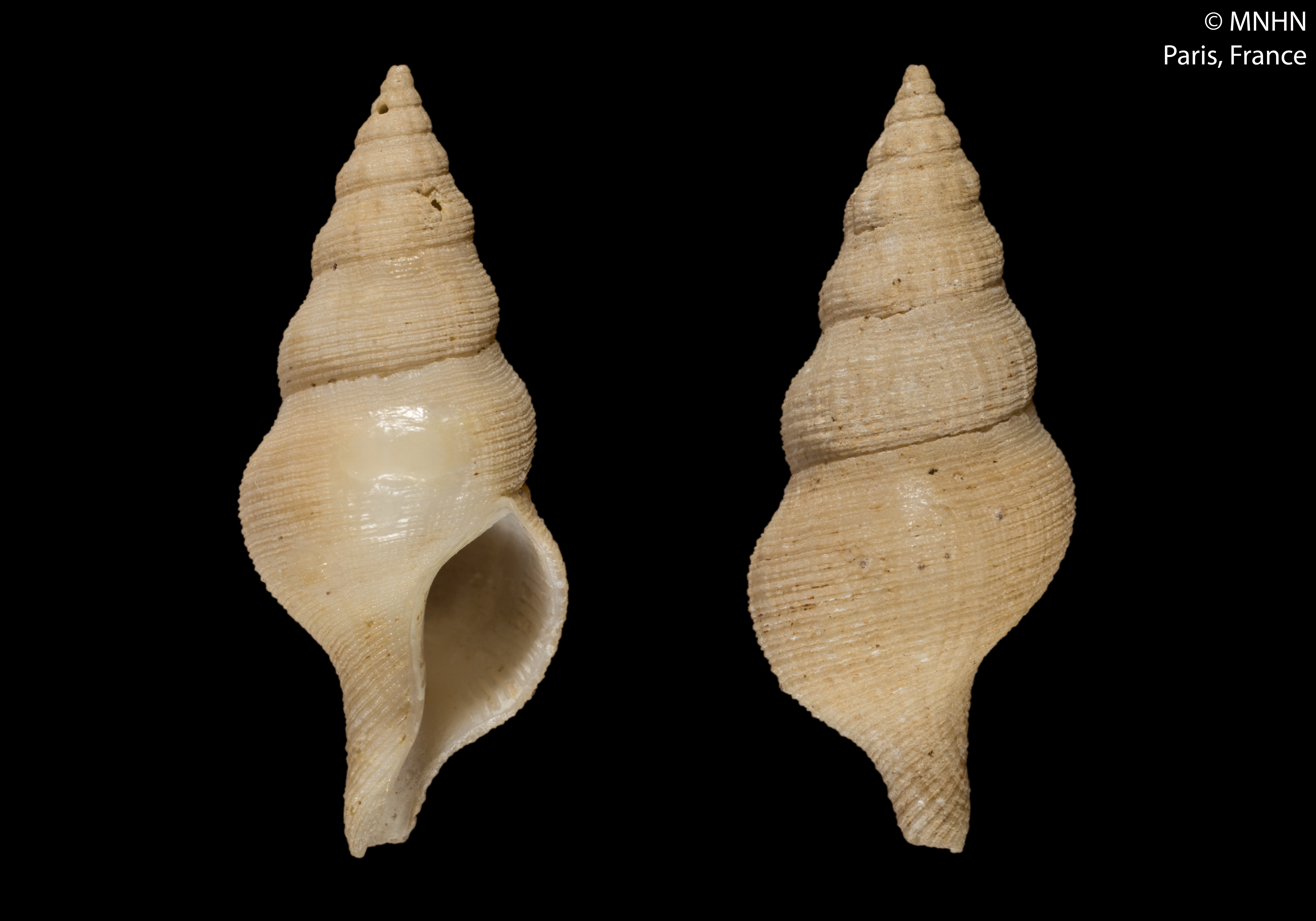
- Shell of Chryseofusus alisae (holotype at MNHN, Paris)

Scientific classification
- Kingdom: Animalia
- Phylum: Mollusca
- Class: Gastropoda
- Subclass: Caenogastropoda
- Order: Neogastropoda
- Family: Fasciolariidae
- Genus: Chryseofusus
- Species: C. alisae

Binomial name
- Chryseofusus alisae (Hadorn & Fraussen, 2003)

Synonyms
- Fusinus (Chryseofusus) alisae Hadorn & Fraussen, 2003· accepted, alternate representation; Fusinus alisae Hadorn & Fraussen, 2003

= Chryseofusus alisae =

Species of gastropod

Chryseofusus alisae is a species of sea snail, a marine gastropod mollusk in the family Fasciolariidae, the spindle snails, the tulip snails and their allies.

== Description ==
The length of the shell attains 29.7 mm.

== Distribution ==
This marine species occurs off New Caledonia.
