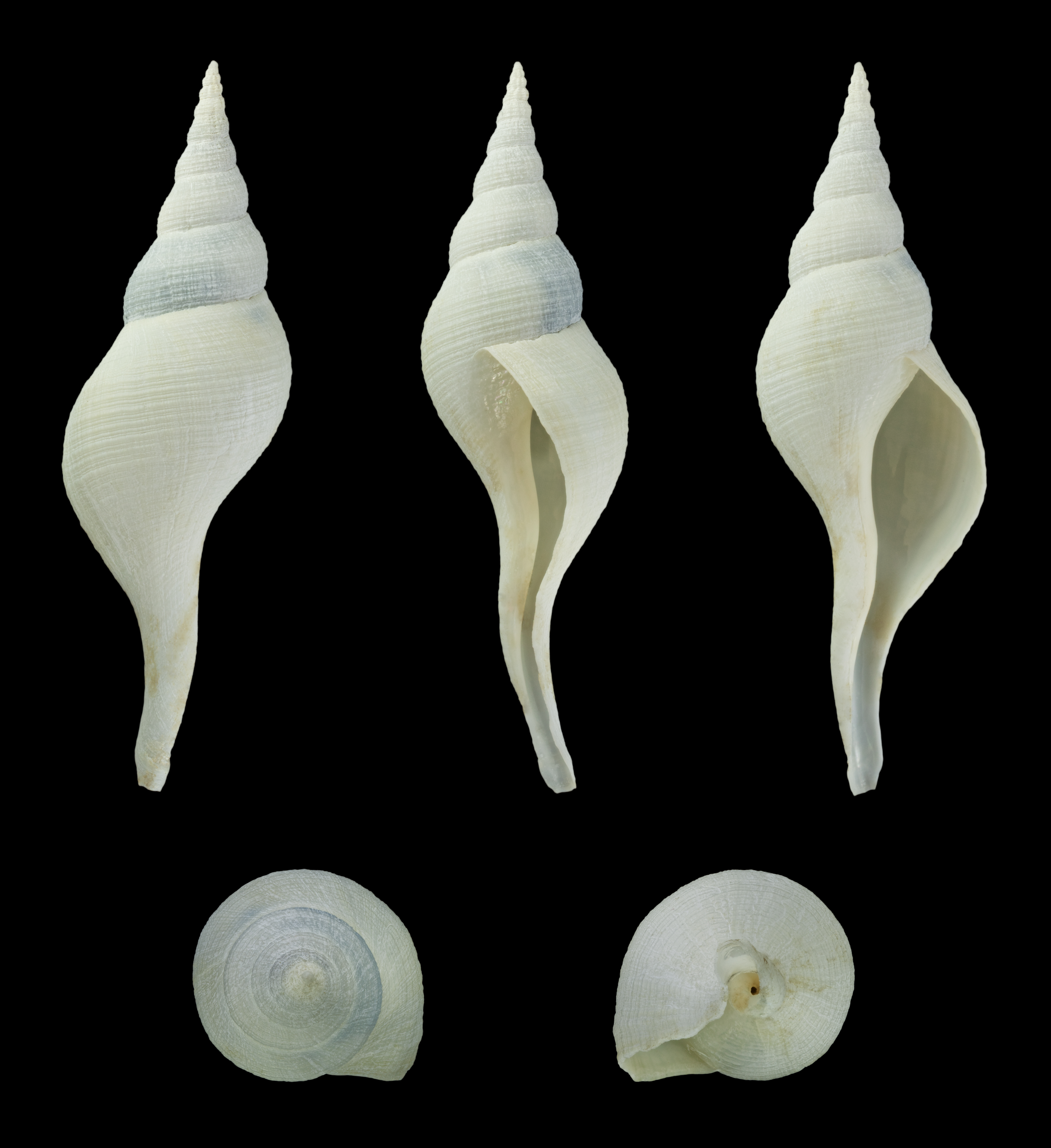

Scientific classification
- Kingdom: Animalia
- Phylum: Mollusca
- Class: Gastropoda
- Subclass: Caenogastropoda
- Order: Neogastropoda
- Family: Fasciolariidae
- Genus: Chryseofusus
- Species: C. graciliformis

Binomial name
- Chryseofusus graciliformis (G.B. Sowerby II, 1880)

Synonyms
- Fusinus (Chryseofusus) graciliformis (G. B. Sowerby II, 1880); Fusus graciliformis G.B. Sowerby II, 1880; Fusinus graciliformis (G.B. Sowerby II, 1880); Fusus sieboldi Schepman, 1891; Fusinus valdiviae Hadorn & Fraussen, 1999

= Chryseofusus graciliformis =

Species of gastropod

Chryseofusus graciliformis is a species of sea snail, a marine gastropod mollusk in the family Fasciolariidae, the spindle snails, the tulip snails and their allies.

== Description ==
The shell attains a length of 50.2 mm.

== Distribution ==
This species occurs in the Indian Ocean off Somalia at a depth of 400 m.
