= East Madagascar Current =

Oceanic flow feature near Madagascar

The East Madagascar Current is an oceanic flow feature near Madagascar. It flows southward from 20°S on the east side of Madagascar to the southern limit at Cape Saint Marie and subsequently feeds the Agulhas Current. Its flow is complicated by large cyclonic and anticyclonic eddies.

The East Madagascar Current has a controlling role in the western boundary current of the southwest Indian Ocean together with the Mozambique Current. The mean speed of the East Madagascar Current varies between 0.2–0–9 m/s (0.66–0.00–29.53 ft/s) with a peak in spring and the lowest point in summer. It creates a high-pressure area and affects the Indian Monsoon.

The East Madagascar Current is intense and narrow and retroflects into the central Indian Ocean south of Madagascar similarly to the Agulhas Current south of South Africa.

== See also ==
- Ocean current
- Oceanic gyres
- Physical oceanography
