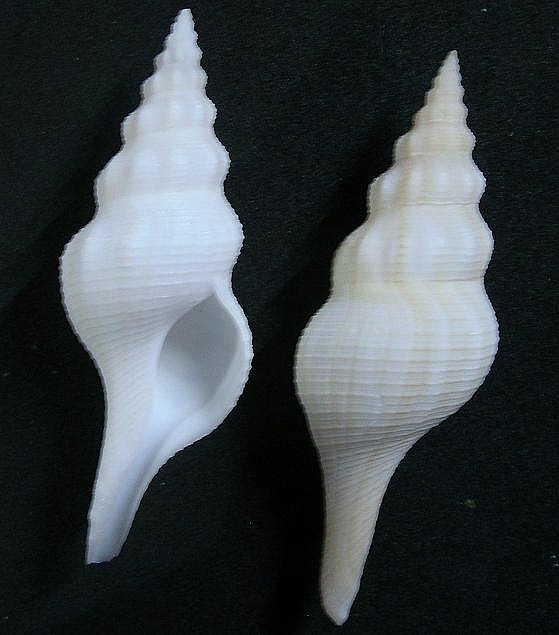

Scientific classification
- Kingdom: Animalia
- Phylum: Mollusca
- Class: Gastropoda
- Subclass: Caenogastropoda
- Order: Neogastropoda
- Family: Fasciolariidae
- Genus: Chryseofusus
- Species: C. jurgeni

Binomial name
- Chryseofusus jurgeni (Hadorn & Fraussen, 2002)

Synonyms
- Fusinus (Chryseofusus) jurgeni (Hadorn & Fraussen, 2002); Fusinus jurgeni Hadorn & Fraussen, 2002 (basionym)

= Chryseofusus jurgeni =

Species of gastropod

Chryseofusus jurgeni is a species of sea snail, a marine gastropod mollusk in the family Fasciolariidae, the spindle snails, the tulip snails and their allies.

== Description ==
The length of the shell attains 94.2 mm.

== Distribution ==
This marine species occurs off southern Madagascar and Mozambique.
