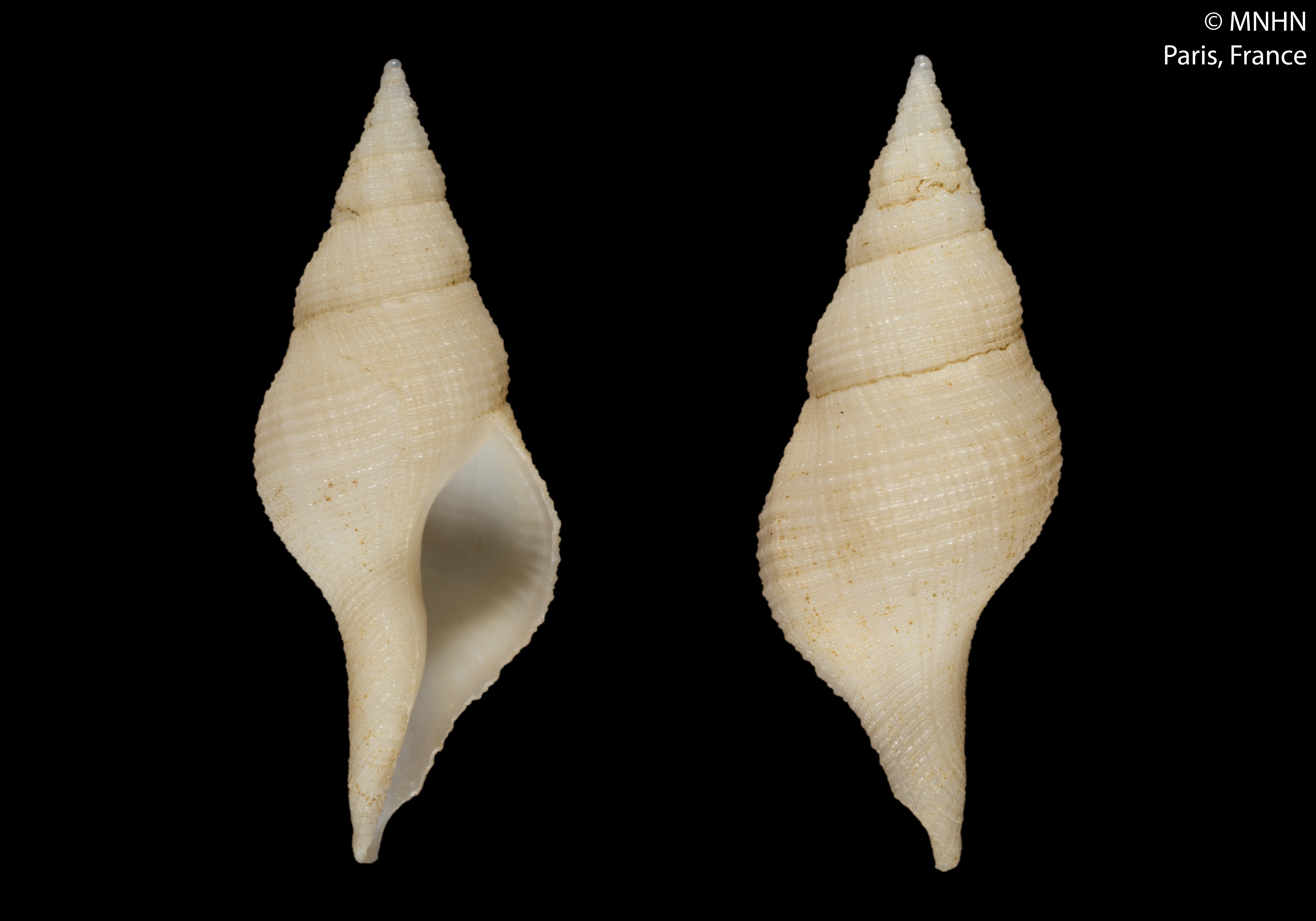
- Shell of Chryseofusus cadus (holotype at MNHN, Paris)

Scientific classification
- Kingdom: Animalia
- Phylum: Mollusca
- Class: Gastropoda
- Subclass: Caenogastropoda
- Order: Neogastropoda
- Family: Fasciolariidae
- Genus: Chryseofusus
- Species: C. cadus

Binomial name
- Chryseofusus cadus (Hadorn & Fraussen, 2003)

Synonyms
- Fusinus (Chryseofusus) cadus Hadorn & Fraussen, 2003· accepted, alternate representation; Fusinus cadus Hadorn & Fraussen, 2003

= Chryseofusus cadus =

Species of gastropod

Chryseofusus cadus is a species of sea snail, a marine gastropod mollusk in the family Fasciolariidae, the spindle snails, the tulip snails and their allies.

== Description ==
The length of the shell attains 35.7 mm.

== Distribution ==
This marine species occurs of New Caledonia.
