= Chryseofusus artutus =

Scientific classification
- Kingdom: Animalia
- Phylum: Mollusca
- Class: Gastropoda
- Subclass: Caenogastropoda
- Order: Neogastropoda
- Family: Fasciolariidae
- Genus: Chryseofusus
- Species: C. artutus

Binomial name
- Chryseofusus artutus (Hadorn & Fraussen, 2003)

Synonyms
- Fusinus artutus Hadorn & Fraussen, 2003

Species of gastropod

Chryseofusus artutus is a species of sea snail, a marine gastropod mollusk in the family Fasciolariidae, the spindle snails, the tulip snails and their allies.
