= Chryseofusus satsumaensis =

Scientific classification
- Kingdom: Animalia
- Phylum: Mollusca
- Class: Gastropoda
- Subclass: Caenogastropoda
- Order: Neogastropoda
- Family: Fasciolariidae
- Genus: Chryseofusus
- Species: C. satsumaensis

Binomial name
- Chryseofusus satsumaensis (Hadorn & Chino, 2005)

Synonyms
- Fusinus satsumaensis Hadorn & Chino, 2005

Species of gastropod

Chryseofusus satsumaensis is a species of sea snail, a marine gastropod mollusk in the family Fasciolariidae, the spindle snails, the tulip snails and their allies.
