= Agulhas Current =

Southwest Indian Ocean current off Africa's east coast

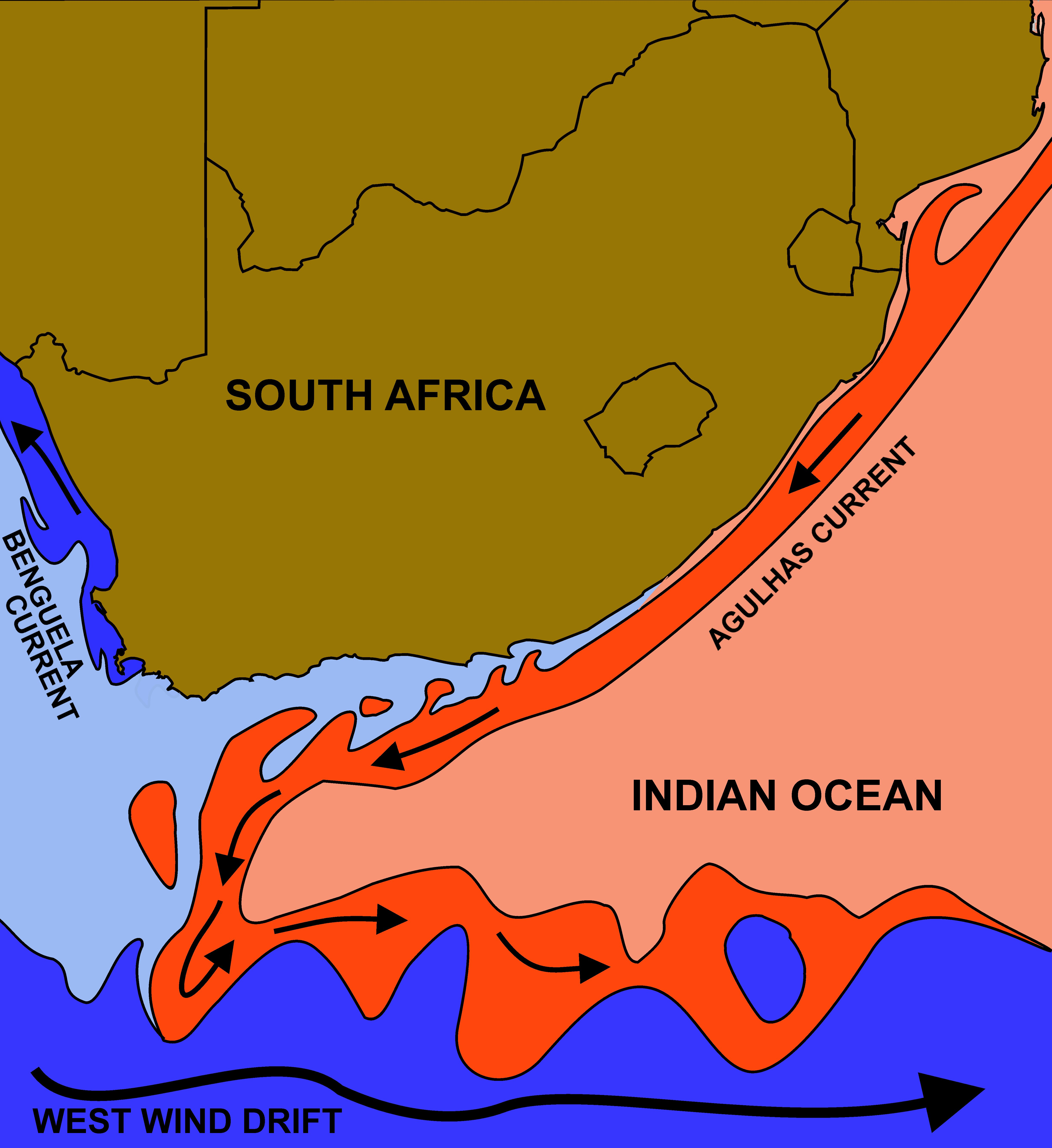
The courses of the warm Agulhas current (red) along the east coast of South Africa, and the cold Benguela current (blue) along the west coast. The Agulhas Current is formed by the confluence of the warm Mozambique and East Madagascar Currents, which meet south-west of Madagascar (not shown in the diagram). The cold Benguela Current originates from upwelling of water from the cold depths of the Atlantic Ocean against the west coast of the continent. The two currents do not "meet" anywhere along the south coast of Africa.

The Agulhas Current (/əˈɡʌləs/) is the western boundary current of the southwest Indian Ocean. It flows south along the east coast of Africa from 27°S to 40°S. It is narrow, swift and strong. It is suggested that it is the largest western boundary current in the world ocean, with an estimated net transport of 70 sverdrups (70 million cubic metres per second), as western boundary currents at comparable latitudes transport less—the Brazil Current 16.2 Sv, the Gulf Stream 34 Sv, and the Kuroshio 42 Sv.

== Physical properties ==
The sources of the Agulhas Current are the East Madagascar Current (25 Sv), the Mozambique Current (5 Sv) and a recirculated part of the south-west Indian subgyre south of Madagascar (35 Sv). The net transport of the Agulhas Current is estimated as 100 Sv. The flow of the Agulhas Current is directed by the topography. The current follows the continental shelf from Maputo to the tip of the Agulhas Bank (250 km south of Cape Agulhas). Here the momentum of the current overcomes the vorticity balance holding the current to the topography and the current leaves the shelf. The current reaches its maximum transport near the Agulhas Bank where it ranges between 95 and 136 Sv.

The core of the current is defined as where the surface velocities reach 100 cm/s (39 in/s), which gives the core an average width of 34 km (21 mi). The mean peak speed is 136 cm/s (54 in/s), but the current can reach 245 cm/s (96 in/s).

=== Agulhas meanders and Natal pulses ===
As the Agulhas Current flows south along the African east coast, it tends to bulge inshore frequently, a deviation from the current's normal path known as Agulhas Current meanders (ACM). These bulges are occasionally (1-7 times per year) followed by a much larger offshore bulge, known as Natal pulses (NP). Natal pulses move along the coast at 20 km (12 mi) per day. An ACM can bulge up to 20 km (12 mi) and a NP up to 120 km (75 mi) from the current's mean position. The AC passes 34 km (21 mi) offshore and an ACM can reach 123 km (76 mi) offshore. When the AC meanders, its width broadens from 88 km (55 mi) to 125 km (78 mi) and its velocity weakens from 208 cm/s (82 in/s) to 136 cm/s (54 in/s). An ACM induces a strong inshore counter-current.

Large-scale cyclonic meanders known as Natal pulses are formed as the Agulhas Current reaches the continental shelf on the South African east-coast (i.e. the eastern Agulhas Bank off Natal). As these pulses moves along the coast on the Agulhas Bank, they tend to pinch off Agulhas rings from the Agulhas Current. Such a ring shedding can be triggered by a Natal pulse alone, but sometimes meanders on the Agulhas Return Current merge to contribute to the shedding of an Agulhas ring.

=== Retroflection ===
In the southeast Atlantic Ocean the current retroflects (turns back on itself) in the Agulhas Retroflection due to shear interactions with the strong Antarctic Circumpolar Current, also known as the "West Wind Drift" despite referring to the ocean current rather than to the surface winds. This water becomes the Agulhas Return Current, rejoining the Indian Ocean Gyre. It is estimated that up to 85 Sv (Sv) of the net transport is returned to the Indian Ocean through the retroflection. The remaining water is transported into the South Atlantic Gyre in the Agulhas Leakage. Along with direct branch currents, this leakage takes place in surface water filaments, and Agulhas Eddies.

=== Agulhas leakage and rings ===
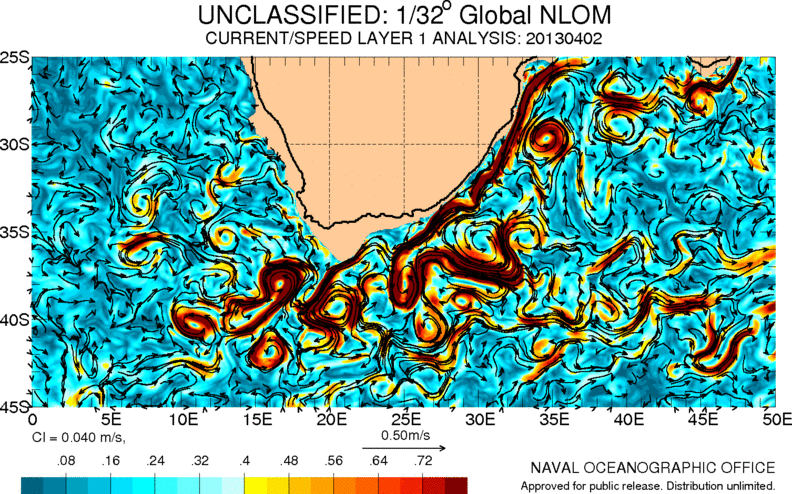
Agulhas rings are peeled off the Agulhas Current in the Agulhas Basin where it retroflects back into the Indian Ocean.

It is estimated that as much as 15 Sv of Indian Ocean water is leaked directly into the South Atlantic. 10 Sv of this is relatively warm, salty thermocline water, with the remaining 5 Sv being cold, low salinity Antarctic Intermediate Water. Since Indian Ocean water is significantly warmer (24-26 °C) and saltier than South Atlantic water, the Agulhas Leakage is a significant source of salt and heat for the South Atlantic Gyre. This heat flux is believed to contribute to the high rate of evaporation in the South Atlantic, a key mechanism in the Meridional Overturning Circulation. A small amount of the Agulhas Leakage joins the North Brazil Current, carrying Indian Ocean water into the North Atlantic Subtropical Gyre. Before reaching the Caribbean Sea, this leakage gets heated up by the sun around the equator, and, when finally joining the Gulf Stream, this warm and salty water contributes to the formation of deep water in the North Atlantic.

Surface water filaments are estimated to account for up to 13% of the total salt transport from the Agulhas Current into the Benguela Current and South Atlantic Gyre. Due to surface dissipation, these filaments are not believed to significantly contribute to inter-basin heat flux.

Where the Agulhas turns back on itself the loop of the retroflection pinches off periodically, releasing an eddy into the South Atlantic Gyre. These "Agulhas Rings" enter the flow of the Benguela Current or are advected northwestward across the South Atlantic where they join the South Equatorial Current, where they dissipate into the larger background currents. These anticyclonic warm core rings are estimated to have a transport of 3-9 Sv each, in total injecting salt at a rate of 2.5$\cdot$10^{6} kg/s and heat at a rate of 45 TW.

==== Paleoclimate ====
Since the Pleistocene, the buoyancy of the South Atlantic thermocline and the strength of the Atlantic meridional overturning circulation has been regulated by the shedding of warm, saline Agulhas Rings. The Agulhas leakage affects the Atlantic thermocline on a decadal timescale and over centuries it can change the buoyancy of the Atlantic thermocline and therefore the formation rates of North Atlantic Deep Water (NADW).

The provenance of ocean sediments can be determined by analysing terrigenous strontium isotope ratios in deep ocean cores. Sediments underlying the Agulhas Current and Return Current have significantly higher ratios than surrounding sediments. Franzese et al. 2009 analysed cores in the South Atlantic deposited during the Last Glacial Maximum (LGM, 20 000 years ago), and concluded that the Agulhas leakage was significantly reduced. The trajectory of the current was the same during the LGM and that the reduced leakage must be explained by a weaker current. Furthermore, it can be predicted that a stronger Agulhas Current will result in a more eastward retroflection and an increased Agulhas leakage. Simon et al. 2013, however, noted that changes in temperature and salinity in the Agulhas leakage is at least partly the result of variability in the composition in the current itself and can be a poor indicator of the strength of the leakage.

=== Rogue waves ===
The south-east coast of South Africa is on the main shipping route between the Middle-East and Europe/the U.S. and even large ships have sustained major damage because of rogue waves in the area where these waves occasionally can reach a height of more than 30 m (98 ft). Some 30 larger ships were severely damaged or sunk by rogue waves along the South African east-coast between 1981 and 1991, and it is believed that the SS Waratah was hit and sunk by a rogue wave in the Agulhas Current during a severe storm in 1909.

=== Agulhas Undercurrent ===
Directly under the core of the Agulhas Current, at a depth of 800 m (2,600 ft), there is an Agulhas Undercurrent which flows equatorward. The undercurrent is 2,000 m (6,600 ft) deep and 40 km (25 mi) wide and can reach 90 cm/s (35 in/s) at 1,400 metres (4,600 ft), one of greatest speeds observed in any current at this depth, but it also displays a great variance with a transport of 4.2±5.2 Sv. The undercurrent can represent as much as 40% of the Indian Ocean overturning transport.

Below 1,800 m (5,900 ft) a separate layer of the undercurrent can be distinguished: the more coherent North Atlantic Deep Water (NADW) which transports an average of 2.3±3.0 Sv. NADW rounds the southern tip of Africa after which the major part (9 Sv) flow eastward and a smaller part (2 Sv) northward through the Agulhas Undercurrent and into the Natal Valley (the basin between South Africa and the Mocambique Plateau); remnants of NADW has been observed in the Mozambique Basin and Channel. The undercurrent is more leaky than the Agulhas above, resulting in a relatively well-mixed composition of water masses — at intermediate depth there is a mixture of Antarctic Intermediate Water and Read Sea Water.

The periodicity of the meanders and Natal pulses of the Agulhas is matched by the Agulhas Undercurrent. More research is needed but observations seem to indicate that during a meander event the Agulhas moves first onshore, then offshore, and finally onshore again, first weakening then strengthening 10-15 Sv. At the same time the undercurrent is first squeezed offshore and weakened when the Agulhas moves onshore, then strengthened and forced upward when the Agulhas moves offshore, and finally returns to normal.

== Biological properties ==
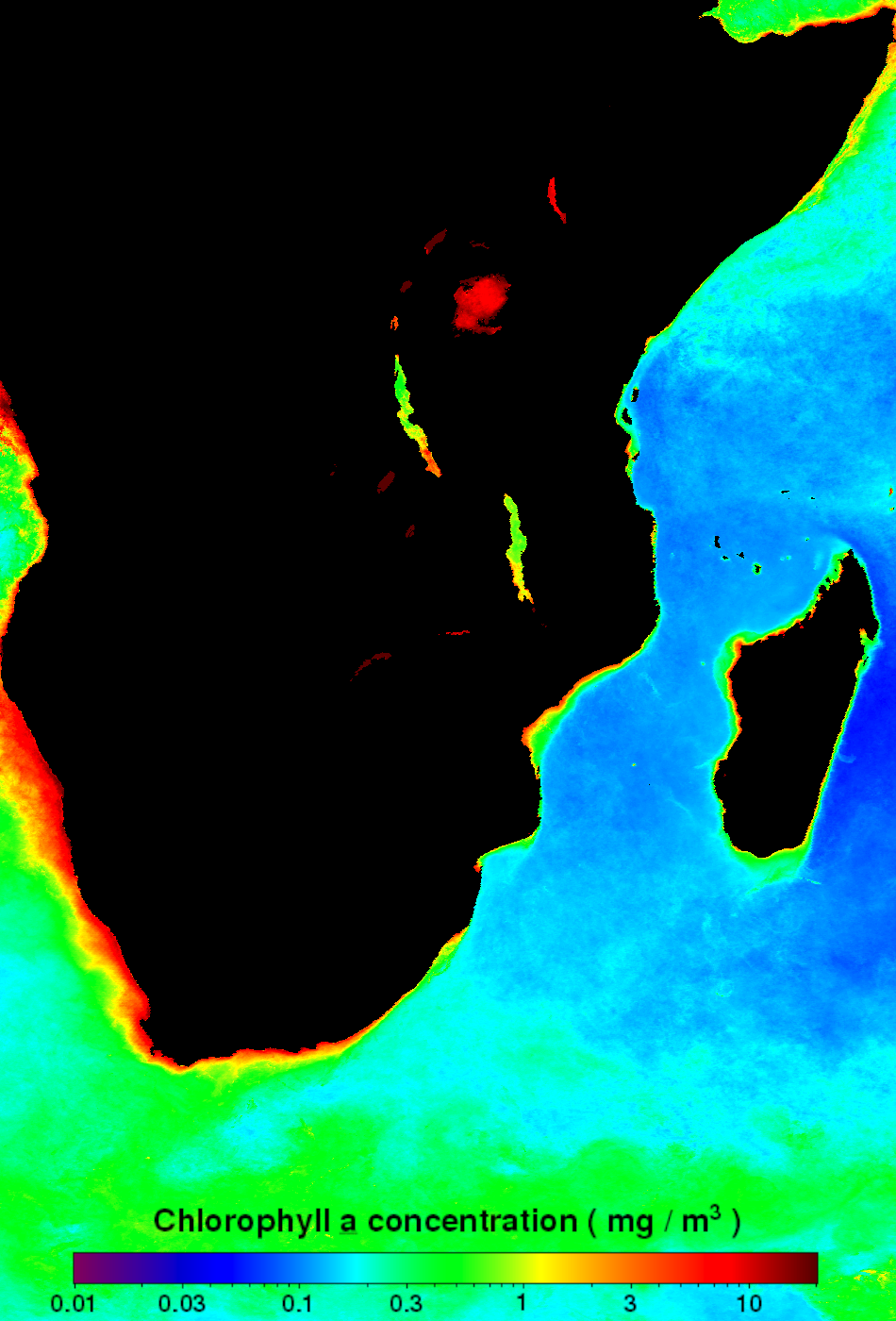
Mean chlorophyll-a concentration map of the Agulhas Current for 2009. Note the high productivity water in the Agulhas Retroflection.

=== Primary production ===
The Agulhas acts as an oceanic convergence zone. Due to mass continuity this drives surface waters down, resulting in the upwelling of cold, nutrient rich water south of the current. Additionally, the convergence tends to increase the concentration of plankton in and around the Agulhas. Both of these factors result in the area being one of enhanced primary productivity as compared to the surrounding waters. This is especially notable in the Agulhas Retroflection waters, where chlorophyll-a concentrations tend to be significantly higher than the surrounding South Indian Ocean and South Atlantic Ocean waters.

=== Impact of rings ===
Warm core rings are known to have lower primary productivity than surrounding cold waters. Agulhas Rings are no exception, and have been observed to carry waters with low chlorophyll-a concentration water into the South Atlantic. The size of phytoplankton in Agulhas Rings tends to be smaller than in the surrounding water (around 20 μm in diameter).

Agulhas Rings have also been observed as removing larval and juvenile fish from the continental shelf. This removal of young fish can result in a reduced anchovy catch in the Benguela system if a ring passes through the fishery.

== See also ==
- Agulhas Passage – Abyssal channel south of South Africa between the Agulhas Bank and Agulhas Plateau
- Sardine run – Annual fish migration off the shores of South Africa
