= Mozambique Current =

Warm ocean current in the Indian Ocean

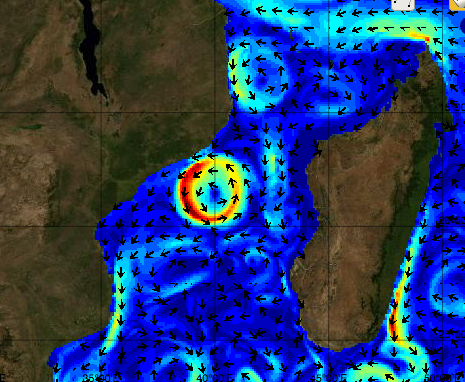
visualisation of ocean currents

The Mozambique Current is an ocean current in the Indian Ocean, usually defined as warm surface waters flowing south along the African east coast in the Mozambique Channel, between Mozambique and the island of Madagascar.

The classical definition of the Mozambique Current is that it is a strong, steady, western boundary current. Modern research has challenged that assumption, and indicates that rather than a strong western boundary current, there are often a series of large anti-cyclonic eddies in the channel. Direct evidence for these eddies has been found in satellite altimetry data, ship borne surveys, and moored current meter records. These same current meter records, that were over two years in length, failed to show a strong, consistent current along the Mozambican coast, largely dispelling the notion of a steady Mozambique Current. Nonetheless, it is impossible to rule out the possibility that the Mozambique Current may appear intermittently, for short durations. Indeed, numerical model simulations in the Mozambique Channel show the appearance of a current on the Mozambican Coast, during periods between eddies.

== Mozambique Channel Eddies ==
Mozambique Channel Eddies are large, warm, anti-cyclonic eddies that propagate southwards in the Mozambique Channel. These eddies may have diameters of up to 300 km, and maximum swirl velocities of nearly 1 m/s. The exact causal mechanism, and location of the eddies formation is still debated. The frequency of eddy occurrence reduces from around seven per year in the north of the Channel, to around four per year in the south. Once the eddies exit the Mozambique Channel, they contribute to the variability of the Agulhas Current, including the generation of the Natal Pulse, and Agulhas Rings.

== See also ==
- Ocean current
- Indian Ocean
- Mozambique
- Madagascar
