= Agulhas Bank Complex Marine Protected Area =

Offshore marine conservation area south of Cape Agulhas in South Africa

- Agulhas Bank Complex MPA location
- Location: Agulhas Bank, South Africa
- Coordinates: 35°32′S 20°45′E
- Established: 2018
- Agulhas Bank Complex Marine Protected Area (Africa)

The Agulhas Bank Complex Marine Protected Area is an offshore marine protected area on the continental shelf lying approximately 39 nautical miles southeast of Cape Agulhas off the Western Cape in the Exclusive Economic Zone of South Africa.

== History ==
The MPA was proclaimed by the Minister of Environmental Affairs, in terms of sections 48A(2) and 86(1)(a), (b), (c) and (d) of the National Environmental Management: Protected Areas Act, 57 of 2003.

== Purpose ==
A marine protected area (MPA) is defined by the IUCN as "A clearly defined geographical space, recognised, dedicated and managed, through legal or other effective means, to achieve the long-term conservation of nature with associated ecosystem services and cultural values".

The Agulhas banks have supported economically important fisheries for more than a century. This MPA is intended to protect spawning aggregations of several economically important fish, including the endangered Red steenbras, the largest seabream, a long lived species that can reach lengths of over 1 m. Before this area was declared an Exclusive Economic Zone in 1972, foreign trawlers targeted redfish in the area, and considerable damage was done to the reefs. Half of the MPA is zoned to allow the use of low impact fishing gear, and this will help support recovery of the damaged habitats. The MPA will also help maintain the tourism economy by way of recreational fishing and scuba diving, and will protect some fishing areas from petroleum extraction impact.

The Agulhas Banks are the key nursery area in the warm temperate ecoregion of South Africa.

This MPA was specifically proclaimed to conserve pelagic, sandy, gravel, and rocky habitats of the Agulhas Bank. These include the Alphard Banks, parts of the 45 Mile Bank and parts of the 72 Mile Bank, their threatened ecosystems and biological diversity. It is also intended to support the recovery of over-exploited linefish populations by protecting their refuge, aggregation, foraging and spawning areas, and to help sustainable use and management of linefish and south coast rock lobster in adjacent areas.

== Extent ==
Area of ocean protected is 4,300 km^{2} (1,700 sq mi). The Alphard banks, which is a volcanic pinnacle that rises from a bottom at about 80 m to about 14 m at the top, is in this MPA. The top of the Alphard bank is covered with an Ecklonia maxima kelp forest. Deeper reefs below about 40 m support cold water corals.

The protected area includes part of the 45 and 72 Mile banks.

=== Zonation ===
Partly restricted and partly controlled zones. The two zones are contiguous as the eastern border of the controlled zone is part of the western border of the restricted zone. It consists of:

1. Restricted Zone or the Agulhas Bank Complex Restricted Zone (ABRZ)
2. Controlled Zone or the Agulhas Bank Complex Controlled Zone (ABCZ)
3. Controlled-Pelagic Linefish Zone, which is the Alphard Banks Controlled-Pelagic Linefish Zone (ABCPLZ).

=== Boundaries ===
The MPA boundaries are:

- Northern boundary: S35°20', E020°30' east to S35°20', E020°45', then north to S35°0’, E20°45’ and east to S35°0’ E21°0’
- Eastern boundary: S35°0’ E21°0’ south to S36°5’, E21°0’
- Southern boundary: S36°5’, E21°0’ west to S36°5’, E20°30’
- Western boundary: 36° 5’, E20°30’ north to 35°20’, E20°30’

==== Restricted areas ====
The Agulhas Bank Complex restricted zone is the area within the boundaries (draft):

- Northern boundary: S35°0', E020°45'; to S35°0', E021°0'
- Eastern boundary: S35°0', E021°0' to S36°5', E021°0'
- Southern boundary: S36°5', E021°0' to S36°5', E020°45'
- Western boundary: S36°5', E020°45', S35°0', E020°45'

==== Controlled zone ====
The Agulhas Bank Complex controlled zone is the area within the boundaries (draft):

- Northern boundary: S35°20', E020°30' to S35°20', E020°45'
- Eastern boundary: S35°20', E020°45' to S36°5', E020°45'
- Southern boundary: S36°5', E020°45' to S36°5', E020°30'
- Western boundary: S36°5', E020°30' to S35°20', E020°30'

== Management ==
The marine protected areas of South Africa are the responsibility of the national government, which has management agreements with a variety of MPA management authorities, which manage the MPA with funding from the SA Government through the Department of Environmental Affairs (DEA).

The Department of Agriculture, Forestry and Fisheries is responsible for issuing permits, quotas and law enforcement.

=== Activities requiring a permit ===
==== Fishing ====
Commercial linefishing or harvesting of south coast rock lobster in the controlled zone requires a valid permit for the specific activity issued in terms of the Marine Living Resources Act and authorised for this MPA.

==== Scuba diving ====
Recreational scuba diving is not mentioned in the regulations. Only the shallower parts of the Alphard banks are accessible for recreational scuba diving without obligatory decompression stops, and they are not dived often due to the long distance offshore.

=== Prohibited activities ===
Fishing is prohibited in the restricted zone. Vessels transiting this zone are required to stow all fishing equipment in such a way that it is not available for use during transit.

Activities listed in section 48(A)1 of the act are prohibited unless authorised by the regulations.

== Geography ==
=== General topography ===
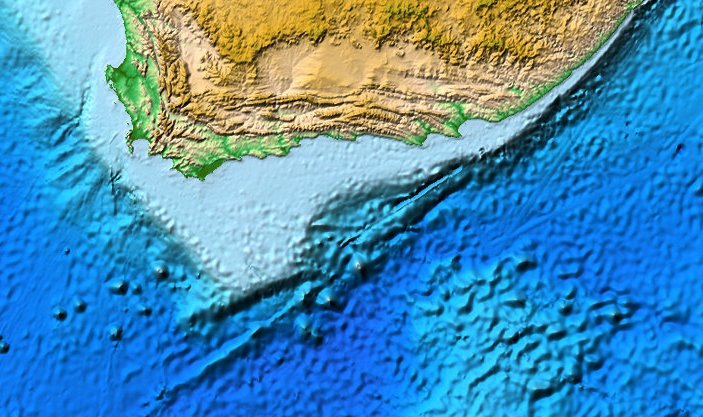
Map of the Agulhas Bank

The Agulhas Bank is a broad, shallow part of the southern African continental shelf which extends up to 250 km (160 mi) south of Cape Agulhas before falling steeply to the abyssal plain.

It is the ocean region where the warm Indian Ocean and the cold Atlantic Ocean meet. This convergence leads to treacherous sailing conditions, accounting for numerous wrecked ships in the area over the years. However the meeting of the oceans here also fuels the nutrient cycle for marine life, making it one of the best fishing grounds in South Africa.

=== Geology ===
The Alphard Tertiary Igneous Province includes Palaeocene tuffs, trachybasalts, aegirine–augite trachytes and aegirine–augite phonolitic trachytes, which have been radiometrically dated at about 58 million years old. The intrusions appear to be tectonic effects.

=== Hydrography ===
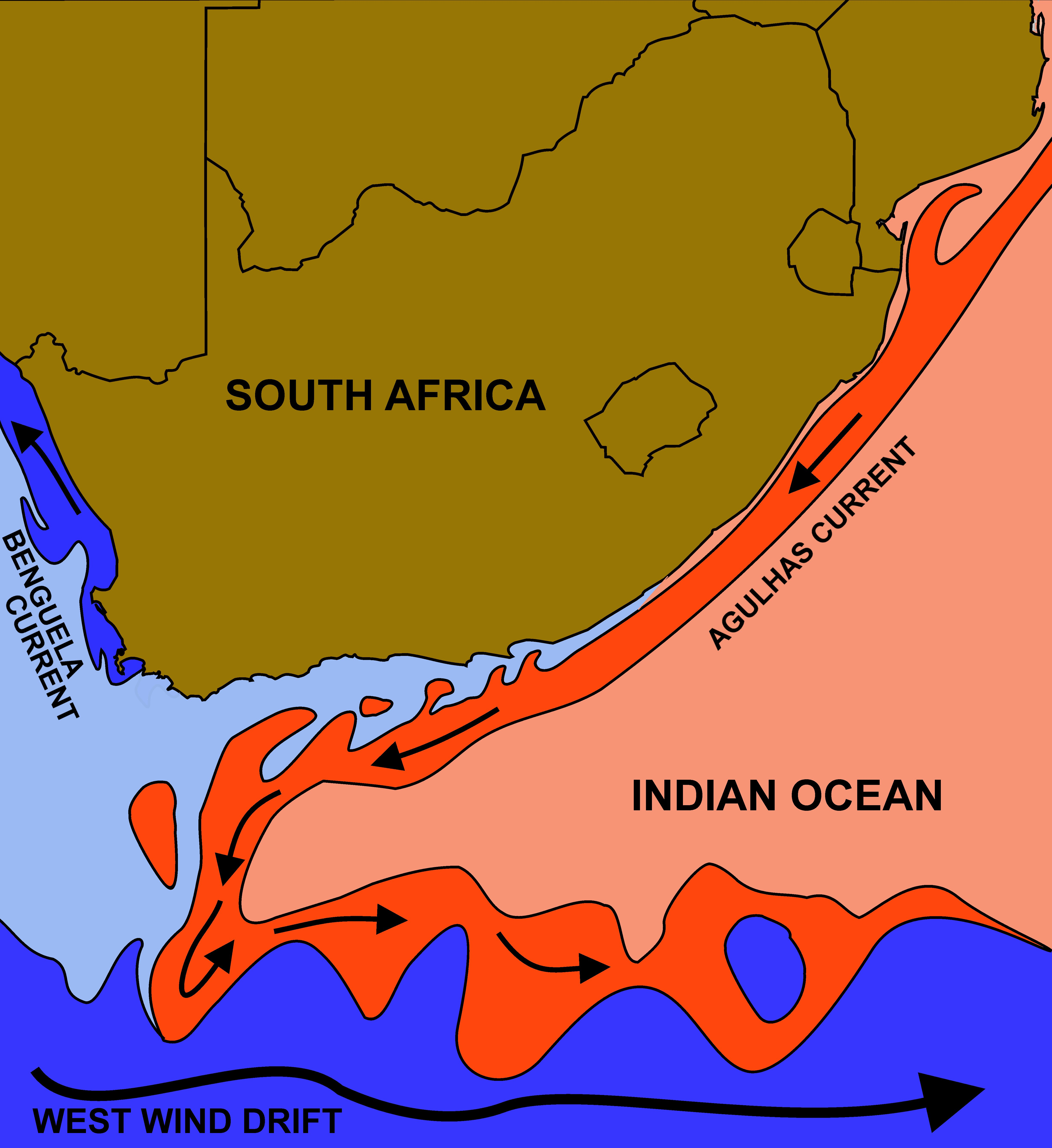
The courses of the warm Agulhas current (red) along the east coast of South Africa, and the cold Benguela current (blue) along the west coast. The Agulhas Current is formed by the confluence of the warm Mozambique and East Madagascar Currents, which meet south-west of Madagascar (not shown in the diagram). The cold Benguela Current originates from upwelling of water from the cold depths of the Atlantic Ocean against the west coast of the continent. The two currents do not "meet" anywhere along the south coast of Africa.

The Agulhas Current is the western boundary current of the southwest Indian Ocean. It flows down the east coast of Africa from 27°S to 40°S. It is narrow, swift and strong. It is suggested that it is the largest western boundary current in the World Ocean, with an estimated net transport of 70 Sverdrups (Sv, millions m^{3}/s), as western boundary currents at comparable latitudes transport less — Brazil Current (16.2 Sv), Gulf Stream (34 Sv), Kuroshio (42 Sv).

=== Bathymetry ===
Most of the MPA waters are in the 50 m to 150 m depth range on the continental shelf.

=== Climate of the South-western Cape ===
The climate of the South-western Cape is markedly different from the rest of South Africa, which is a summer rainfall region, receiving most of its rainfall during the summer months of December to February. The South-western Cape has a Mediterranean type climate, with most of its rainfall during the winter months from June to September.

During the summer the dominant factor determining the weather in the region is a high pressure zone, known as the South Atlantic High, located over the South Atlantic ocean to the west of the Cape coast. Winds circulating in an anticlockwise direction from such a system reach the Cape from the south-east, producing periods of up to several days of high winds and mostly clear skies. These winds keep the region relatively cool. The Agulhas Bank complex is exposed to these winds.

Winter in the South-western Cape is characterised by disturbances in the circumpolar westerly winds, resulting in a series of eastward moving depressions. These bring cool cloudy weather and rain from the north west. The south westerly winds over the South Atlantic produce the prevailing south-westerly swell typical of the winter months.

== Ecology ==
Marine ecoregions of the South African exclusive economic zone: The Agulhas Bank Complex Marine Protected Area is in the Agulhas inshore marine ecoregion.

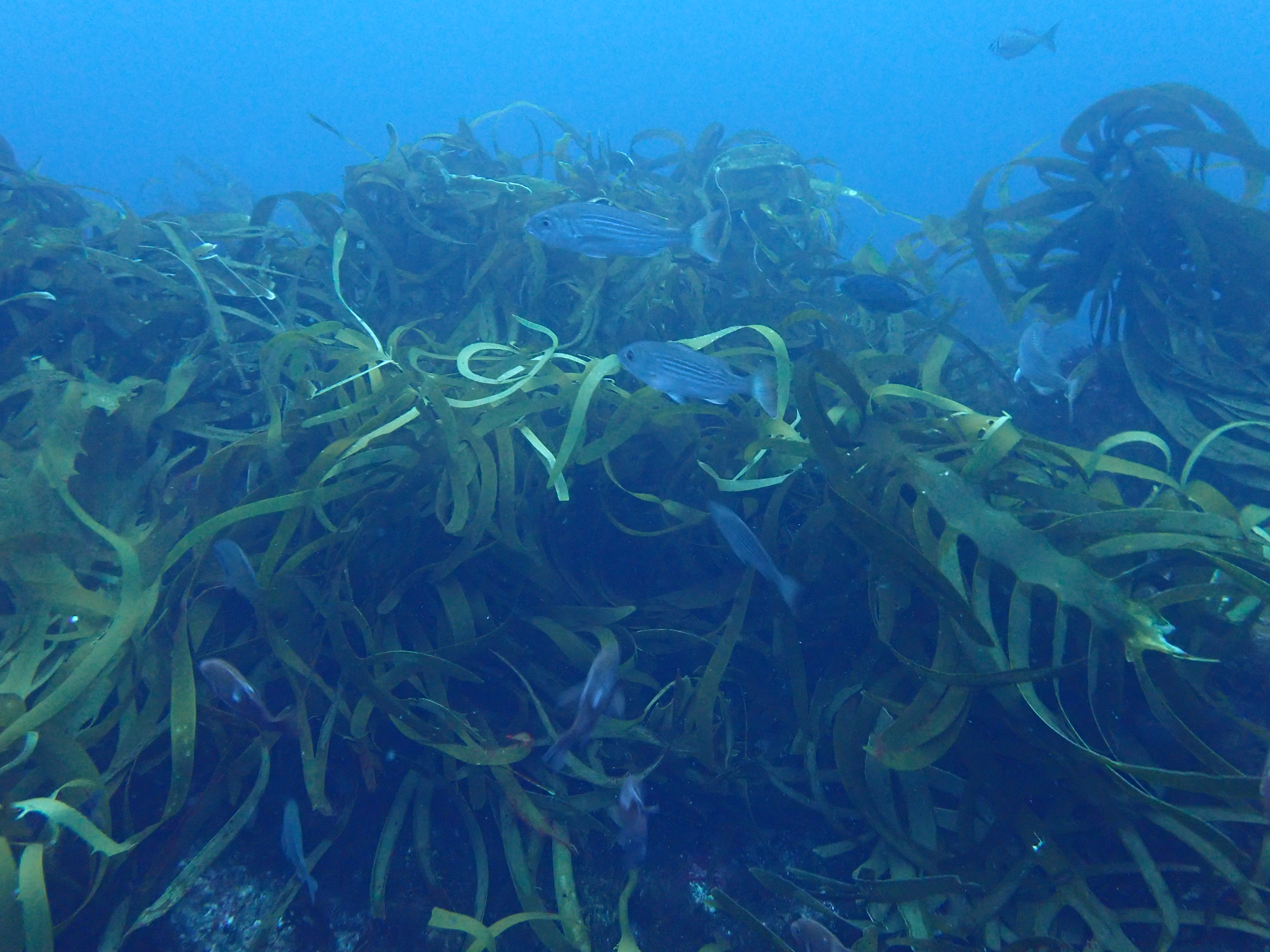
Ecklonia radiata Kelp forest at the west pinnacle at Alphard Banks

The MPA is in the warm temperate Agulhas inshore marine ecoregion to the east of Cape Point which extends eastwards to the Mbashe River. There are a large proportion of species endemic to South Africa along this coastline.

Two major benthic habitats exist in the sea in this region, distinguished by the nature of the substrate. The substrate, or base material, is important in that it provides a base to which an organism can anchor itself, which is vitally important for those organisms which need to stay in one particular kind of place. Rocky reefs provide a firm fixed substrate for the attachment of plants and animals. Sedimentary bottoms are a relatively unstable substrate and cannot anchor many of the benthic organisms. Above these there is open water, where the organisms must drift or swim. Mixed habitats are also frequently found, which are a combination of those mentioned above.

Rocky reefs There are rocky reefs and mixed rocky and sandy bottoms. For many marine organisms the substrate is another type of marine organism, and it is common for several layers to co-exist. Examples of this are red bait pods, which are usually encrusted with sponges, ascidians, bryozoans, anemones, and gastropods, and abalone, which are usually covered by similar seaweeds to those found on the surrounding rocks, usually with a variety of other organisms living on the seaweeds.

The type of rock of the reef is of some importance, as it influences the range of possibilities for the local topography, which in turn influences the range of habitats provided, and therefore the diversity of inhabitants. The volcanic cores of the Alphard Banks have left a raised area of resistant rock. Sandstone and other sedimentary rocks erode and weather very differently from igneous rocks, and depending on the direction of dip and strike, and steepness of the dip, may produce reefs which are relatively flat to very high profile and full of small crevices. These features may be at varying angles to the shoreline and wave fronts.

Kelp forests Kelp forests are a variation of rocky reefs, as the kelp requires a fairly strong and stable substrate which can withstand the loads of repeated waves dragging on the kelp plants. The Sea bamboo Ecklonia maxima grows in water which is shallow enough to allow it to reach to the surface with its gas-filled stipes, so that the fronds form a dense layer at or just below the surface, depending on the tide. The shorter Spiny kelp Ecklonia radiata also grows on deeper reefs, where there is not so much competition from the sea bamboo. Both these kelp species provide food and shelter for a variety of other organisms, particularly the Sea bamboo, which is a base for a wide range of epiphytes, which in turn provide food and shelter for more organisms. The Alphard Banks are noted for the kelp forest on top.

Unconsolidated sedimentary bottoms (including shelly, pebble and gravel bottoms) Sedimentary bottoms at first glance appear to be fairly barren areas, as they lack the stability to support many of the spectacular reef based species, and the variety of large organisms is relatively low. The sediment smay be moved around by wave and current action, to a greater or lesser degree depending on weather conditions and exposure of the area. This means that sessile organisms must be specifically adapted to areas of relatively loose substrate to thrive in them, and the variety of species found on a sandy or gravel bottom will depend on all these factors. Sedimentary bottoms have one important compensation for their instability, animals can burrow into the sediment and move up and down within its layers, which can provide feeding opportunities and protection from predation. Other species can dig themselves holes in which to shelter, or may feed by filtering water drawn through the tunnel, or by extending body parts adapted to this function into the water above the sand.

The open sea

=== Marine species diversity ===
==== Animals ====
Fish:

- Argyrosomus inodorus (silver kob)
- Attractoscion aequidens (geelbek)
- Chrysoblephus cristiceps (dageraad)
- Chrysoblephus gibbiceps (red stumpnose, miss lucy)
- Cymatoceps nasutus (black musselcracker, poenskop)
- Seriola lalandi (yellowtail)
- Petrus rupestris (red steenbras)
- Pomatomus saltatrix (shad, elf)
- blue marlin
- stingrays

Marine reptiles:

- turtles

Invertebrates:

- South coast rock lobster

==== Seaweeds ====
- Ecklonia maxima (Kelp)
- Ecklonia radiata

==== Endemism ====
The MPA is in the warm temperate Agulhas inshore marine bioregion to the east of Cape Point which extends eastwards to the Mbashe River. There are a large proportion of species endemic to South Africa along this coastline.

== See also ==
Marine protected areas of South Africa

- List of protected areas of South Africa
- Marine protected areas of South Africa – Protected areas of coastline or ocean in the EEZ of South Africa
